= Kuwait women's national football team results =

The Kuwait women's national football team is the representative women's association football team of Kuwait. Its governing body is the Kuwait Football Association (KFA) and it competes as a member of the Asian Football Confederation (AFC).

== Results ==
=== 2010 ===
22 February 2010 2010 WAFF Women's Championship	Palestine	17–0	Kuwait	Abu Dhabi, United Arab Emirates
14:00	6'; 26'; 33'; 36'; 41'; 45'; 46'; 48'; 49'; 53'; 55'; 63'; 69'; 71'; 72'; 77'; 83'	Report

24 February 2010 2010 WAFF Women's Championship	Kuwait	0–7	United Arab Emirates	Abu Dhabi, United Arab Emirates
		Report

=== 2012 ===
26 May 2012 International Friendly	Qatar	2–0	Kuwait	Doha, Qatar
18:00	Yousuf (??)	Report; Report (SW)		Stadium: Jassim bin Hamad Stadium

24 November 2012 International Friendly	Kuwait	1–1	Maldives	Kuwait City, Kuwait

27 November 2012 International Friendly	Kuwait	1–3	Maldives	Kuwait City, Kuwait

=== 2013 ===
8 January 2013 International Friendly	Kuwait	0–8	Nepal	Kuwait City, Kuwait
		Report		Stadium: Mohammed Al-Hamad Stadium

5 June 2013 2014 AFC Women's Asian Cup qualification	Uzbekistan	18–0	Kuwait	Amman, Jordan
16:00	Juraeva 4', 14', 21', 35', 45+1', 51', 58', 73'; Turdiboeva 6', 42'; Riskieva 23'; Sarikova 31'; Turapova 34', 36', 65'; Moiseeva 70'; Bakhromova 72'; Zarbieva 78'	Report		Stadium: Amman International Stadium; Attendance: 200; Referee: Maria Piedade Rebello (India)

7 June 2013 2014 AFC Women's Asian Cup qualification	Kuwait	0–21	Jordan	Amman, Jordan
19:00		Report	Jebreen 3', 70'; Jbarah 16', 18', 19', 28', 32', 45+1', 53', 81'; Al-Naber 17', 35', 38', 72'; Al-Nahar 20', 43', 56', 71', 84', 90+1'; Al-Masri 78'	Stadium: Amman International Stadium; Attendance: 500; Referee: Saltanat Narouzi (Iran)

9 June 2013 2014 AFC Women's Asian Cup qualification	Lebanon	12–1	Kuwait	Amman, Jordan
16:00	Dbouk 12'; Assaf 19', 51'; El Jaafil 27'; Schtakleff 29', 77'; Bahlawan 38', 90+3'; Al Sayegh 45+1', 46'; Hamadeh 56'; Bakri 80'	Report	Haji 86'	Stadium: Amman International Stadium; Attendance: 100; Referee: Li Juan (China)
