= Lebanon women's national football team results =

The Lebanon women's national football team is the representative women's association football team of Lebanon. Its governing body is the Lebanese Football Association (LFA) and it competes as a member of the Asian Football Confederation (AFC). The national team's first activity was in 2006, when they played in the Arab Women's Championship.

Lebanon's first qualification tournament was the 2014 AFC Women's Asian Cup qualification. The team finished runners-up in the 2022 edition of the WAFF Women's Championship, and in third place at the 2007 and 2019 editions.

== Record per opponent ==
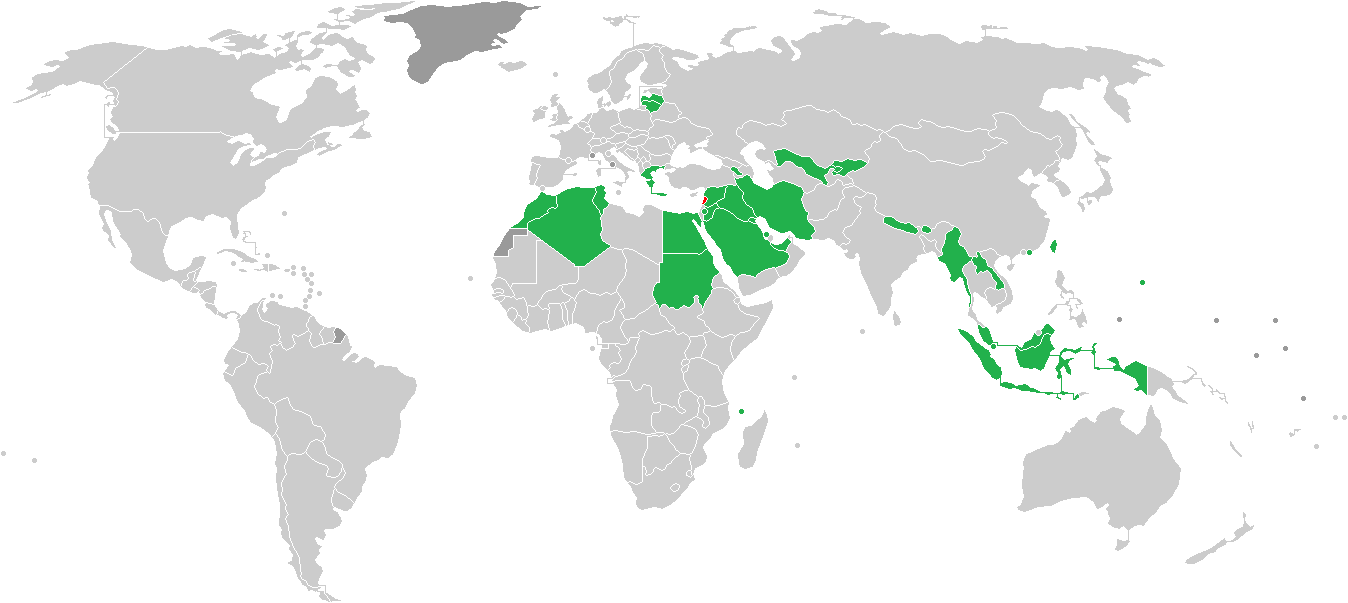
Map of opponents Lebanon has faced (19 July 2025)

Key

Positive balance (more wins than losses)
Neutral balance (as many wins as losses)
Negative balance (more losses than wins)

The following table shows Lebanon's all-time official international record per opponent.

Opponent	Pld	W	D	L	GF	GA	GD	W%	PPG (Note: According to the "three points for a win" standard)	Confederation
Algeria	1	0	0	1	0	12	−12	0.00	0.00	CAF
Armenia	1	0	0	1	0	2	−2	0.00	0.00	UEFA
Bahrain	2	0	0	2	3	6	−3	0.00	0.00	AFC
Bhutan	3	2	0	1	5	4	+1	66.67	2.00	AFC
Chinese Taipei	1	0	0	1	1	5	−4	0.00	0.00	AFC
Comoros	2	1	1	0	5	1	+4	50.00	2.00	CAF
Egypt	4	0	0	4	3	13	−10	0.00	0.00	CAF
Guam	2	2	0	0	7	3	+4	100.00	3.00	AFC
Greece	1	0	0	1	0	14	−14	0.00	0.00	UEFA
Hong Kong	1	0	0	1	0	4	−4	0.00	0.00	AFC
Indonesia	1	1	0	0	5	0	+5	100.00	3.00	AFC
Iran	4	1	0	3	4	20	−16	25.00	0.75	AFC
Iraq	1	1	0	0	9	0	+9	100.00	3.00	AFC
Jordan	11	0	0	11	4	45	−41	0.00	0.00	AFC
Kuwait	1	1	0	0	12	1	+11	100.00	3.00	AFC
Kyrgyzstan	1	1	0	0	2	0	+2	100.00	3.00	AFC
Laos	1	1	0	0	4	1	+3	100.00	3.00	AFC
Latvia	1	0	0	1	0	6	−6	0.00	0.00	UEFA
Lithuania	1	0	0	1	1	7	−6	0.00	0.00	UEFA
Malaysia	1	0	1	0	0	0	0	0.00	1.00	AFC
Morocco	1	0	0	1	0	8	−8	0.00	0.00	CAF
Myanmar	2	0	0	2	1	7	−6	0.00	0.00	AFC
Nepal	2	0	0	2	1	3	−2	0.00	0.00	AFC
Palestine	9	6	2	1	19	8	+11	66.67	2.22	AFC
Tunisia	1	0	1	0	0	0	+0	0.00	1.00	CAF
Saudi Arabia	1	1	0	0	3	2	+1	100.00	3.00	AFC
Singapore	1	1	0	0	1	0	+1	100.00	3.00	AFC
Syria	10	8	1	1	25	7	+18	80.00	2.50	AFC
Sudan	1	1	0	0	5	1	+4	100.00	3.00	CAF
United Arab Emirates	4	2	0	2	3	8	−5	50.00	1.50	AFC
Uzbekistan	1	0	0	1	0	4	−4	0.00	3.00	AFC
Total	74	30	6	38	123	192	−69	40.54	1.30	—

Last updated: Lebanon vs Palestine, 13 October 2026.

== Results ==
=== 2006 ===
19 April 2006 2006 Arab Championship	Lebanon	0–12	Algeria	Alexandria, Egypt

23 April 2006 2006 Arab Championship	Lebanon	0–8	Morocco	Alexandria, Egypt

=== 2007 ===
30 March 2007 Friendly	Syria	2–0	Lebanon	Damascus, Syria

1 April 2007 Friendly	Syria	0–1	Lebanon	Damascus, Syria
		Report	El Ammouri

3 September 2007 2007 WAFF Championship	Jordan	3–0	Lebanon	Amman, Jordan
	Al-Naber; Al-Azab; Jbarah

5 September 2007 2007 WAFF Championship	Lebanon	0–3	Iran	Amman, Jordan

7 September 2007 2007 WAFF Championship	Lebanon	7–0	Syria	Amman, Jordan
	Chaito; Assaf; Hamadeh; Krayem

=== 2010 ===
19 October 2010 2010 Arabia Cup	Egypt	5–1	Lebanon	Manama, Bahrain
	Ebrahim		Bakri	Stadium: Al Ahli Stadium

21 October 2010 2010 Arabia Cup	Jordan	3–1	Lebanon	Manama, Bahrain
	Jbarah; Al-Naber		Bakri	Stadium: Al Ahli Stadium

23 October 2010 2010 Arabia Cup	Lebanon	9–0	Iraq	Riffa, Bahrain
	Bakri; El Jaafil; Ammouri; Yordanov; Haidar; (o.g.)			Stadium: Bahrain National Stadium

=== 2011 ===
15 September 2011 Friendly	Jordan	10–1	Lebanon	Amman, Jordan
	Sweilem 10', 15'; Al-Masri 20'; Khraisat 30', 33'; Jebreen 50', 66'; Jbarah 70', 80', 88'		Bakri 52' (pen.)

17 September 2011 Friendly	Jordan	2–0	Lebanon	Amman, Jordan
	Jbarah; Al-Naber

4 October 2011 2011 WAFF Championship	Iran	8–1	Lebanon	Abu Dhabi, United Arab Emirates
	Karimi 16', 69'; Marzdashtri 65', 75'; Rahimi 67', 83'; Rawas 85' (o.g.); Ghanbari 88'	Report	Assaf 36'

6 October 2011 2011 WAFF Championship	Lebanon	1–0	Syria	Abu Dhabi, United Arab Emirates
	Saleh 90+1'	Report

8 October 2011 2011 WAFF Championship	United Arab Emirates	5–0	Lebanon	Abu Dhabi, United Arab Emirates
	Hasanain 1'; Marek 16'; Zerrouki 44'; Trodi 58'; Nacha 64'	Report

=== 2013 ===
5 June 2013 2014 Asian Cup qualification	Jordan	5–0	Lebanon	Amman, Jordan
	Al-Masri 21'; Al-Naber 33', 40'; Khraisat 53', 59'

7 June 2013 2014 Asian Cup qualification	Uzbekistan	4–0	Lebanon	Amman, Jordan
	Turdiboeva 2'; Juraeva 41'; Turopova 45+2'; Ermatova 46'

9 June 2013 2014 Asian Cup qualification	Lebanon	12–1	Kuwait	Amman, Jordan
	Dbouk 12'; Assaf 19', 51'; El Jaafil 27'; Schtakleff 29', 77'; Bahlawan 38', 90+3'; Al Sayegh 45+1', 46'; Hamadeh 56'; Bakri 80'		Hajji 86'

=== 2015 ===
12 March 2015 2015 Aphrodite Cup	Greece	14–0	Lebanon	Peyia, Cyprus
	Panteliadou; Moskofidou; Kydonaki; Koggouli; Markou; Arvanitaki; Kokoviadou

13 March 2015 2015 Aphrodite Cup	Latvia	6–0	Lebanon	Geroskipou, Cyprus
	Fedotova; Vaciete

15 March 2015 2015 Aphrodite Cup	United Arab Emirates	3–0	Lebanon	Peyia, Cyprus
	Saleh; Jassem; Rashid

18 March 2015 2015 Aphrodite Cup	Bahrain	3–1	Lebanon	Peyia, Cyprus
	Al Khalifa; Al Hashmi; Licence		Bahlawan

=== 2017 ===
21 March 2017 Friendly	Lebanon	4–0	Syria	Beirut, Lebanon
	Bakri 15'; Al Ghoul 30'; Khalil 75'; Shaar 85'			Stadium: Bir Hassan Stadium

=== 2018 ===
8 November 2018 2020 AFC Olympic qualification	Iran	8–0	Lebanon	Chonburi, Thailand
15:00	Chahkandi 9', 44'; Ghanbari 38', 54', 66'; Dabbaghi 57', 90+6'; Motevalli 90'	Report		Stadium: IPE Stadium; Attendance: 30; Referee: Asaka Matsushita (Japan)

11 November 2018 2020 AFC Olympic qualification	Hong Kong	4–0	Lebanon	Chonburi, Thailand
15:00	Cheung Wai Ki 52'; Wai Yuen Ting 55', 56'; Kwong Wing Yan 80'	Report		Stadium: IPE Stadium; Attendance: 104; Referee: Công Thi Dựng (Vietnam)

=== 2019 ===
7 January 2019 2019 WAFF Championship	Bahrain	3–2	Lebanon	Muharraq, Bahrain
19:00	Licence 69'; Allisa 78', 81'	Report	Tamim 57'; Kasty 90+1'	Stadium: Shaikh Ali Bin Mohammed Stadium

9 January 2019 2019 WAFF Championship	Lebanon	2–0	United Arab Emirates	Muharraq, Bahrain
19:00	Mokdad 45+1'; Awad 86'	Report		Stadium: Shaikh Ali Bin Mohammed Stadium

11 January 2019 2019 WAFF Championship	Jordan	3–1	Lebanon	Muharraq, Bahrain
16:00	Hina 8'; Al-Sufy 12'; Jebreen 56'	Report	Tamim 58'	Stadium: Shaikh Ali Bin Mohammed Stadium

15 January 2019 2019 WAFF Championship	Lebanon	3–0	Palestine	Muharraq, Bahrain
16:00	Tamim 7'; Jurdi 16'; Awad 23'	Report		Stadium: Shaikh Ali Bin Mohammed Stadium

=== 2021 ===
8 April 2021 2021 Armenia Tournament	Armenia	2–0	Lebanon	Yerevan, Armenia
	Haddad 7' (o.g.); Artin 45'	Report		Stadium: Pyunik Training Centre

10 April 2021 2021 Armenia Tournament	Lithuania	7–1	Lebanon	Yerevan, Armenia
	Jonušaitė 5', 16', 43'; Vaitukaitytė 12' (pen.), 31'; Lazdauskaitė 34'; Ruzgutė 57'	Report	El Tayar 32'	Stadium: Pyunik Training Centre

12 April 2021 2021 Armenia Tournament	Lebanon	0–6	Jordan	Charentsavan, Armenia
		Report	Jbarah 17', 61'; Fraij 20', 48'; Al-Masri 38'; Al-Btoush 72'	Stadium: Charentsavan City Stadium

24 August 2021 2021 Arab Cup GS	Tunisia	0–0	Lebanon	Cairo, Egypt
21:00 UTC+2		Report		Stadium: Police Academy Stadium; Referee: Bouchra Karboubi (Morocco)

27 August 2021 2021 Arab Cup GS	Lebanon	0–4	Egypt	Cairo, Egypt
21:00 UTC+2		Report	Elmitwalli; Nadda; Abu Al Joud; Ghazi	Stadium: Police Academy Stadium; Referee: Lamia Athman (Algeria)

30 August 2021 2021 Arab Cup GS	Lebanon	5–1	Sudan	Cairo, Egypt
21:00 UTC+2	Al Kasti 3', 19'; Maalouf 6'; Salha 26', 44'	Report		Stadium: Osman Ahmed Osman Stadium

18 October 2021 2022 Asian Cup qualification	Myanmar	4–0	Lebanon	Bishkek, Kyrgyzstan
12:00 UTC+6	Win Theingi Tun 24' (pen.); Myat Noe Khin 64'; San Thaw Thaw 86'; July Kyaw 90+3'	Report		Stadium: Dolen Omurzakov Stadium; Referee: Wang Chieh (Chinese Taipei)

21 October 2021 2022 Asian Cup qualification	Lebanon	1–0	United Arab Emirates	Bishkek, Kyrgyzstan
12:00 UTC+6	Salha 54'	Report		Stadium: Dolen Omurzakov Stadium; Attendance: 0 Referee: Park Se-jin (South Korea)

24 October 2021 2022 Asian Cup qualification	Guam	0–3	Lebanon	Bishkek, Kyrgyzstan
17:00 UTC+6		Report	Tamim 29', 61'; Iskandar 47'	Stadium: Dolen Omurzakov Stadium; Attendance: 0 Referee: Wang Chieh (Chinese Taipei)

=== 2022 ===
12 August 2022 Friendly	Lebanon	1–1	Syria	Bhamdoun, Lebanon
16:00 UTC+3	Maalouf 15'	Report	Aizouq 70'	Stadium: Amin Abdelnour Stadium; Referee: Doumouh Al Bakkar (Lebanon)

14 August 2022 Friendly	Lebanon	2–1	Syria	Bhamdoun, Lebanon
11:00 UTC+3	Maalouf 20', 55'	Report	Mohammad 48'	Stadium: Amin Abdelnour Stadium; Referee: Doumouh Al Bakkar (Lebanon)

29 August 2022 2022 WAFF Championship	Palestine	0–3	Lebanon	Amman, Jordan
17:00 UTC+3		Report	Fayad 10'; Maalouf 74'; Iskandar 90+2'	Stadium: Petra Stadium; Referee: Alesar Baddour (Syria)

1 September 2022 2022 WAFF Championship	Lebanon	1–2	Jordan	Amman, Jordan
21:00 UTC+3	Arabi 51'	Report	Al Bitar 26'; Al Btoush 66'	Stadium: Petra Stadium

4 September 2022 2022 WAFF Championship	Lebanon	5–2	Syria	Amman, Jordan
17:00 UTC+3	Oghlan 9' (o.g.); Azzi 42'; Maalouf 51'; Allouch 62'; Khoury 68'	Report	Gharib 73'; Mohammad 90+1'	Stadium: Petra Stadium; Attendance: 100; Referee: Esra'a Al Mbaidin (Jordan)

=== 2023 ===
19 February 2023 Friendly	Lebanon	1–2	Egypt	Jounieh, Lebanon
11:00 UTC+2	Salha 15'	Report	Ismael 53'; Essam 56'	Stadium: Fouad Chehab Stadium; Referee: Doumouh Al Bakkar (Lebanon)

22 February 2023 Friendly	Lebanon	1–2	Egypt	Jounieh, Lebanon
15:00 UTC+3	Iskandar 55'	Report	Ismael 42'; Maustafa 88'	Stadium: Fouad Chehab Stadium; Referee: Doumouh Al Bakkar (Lebanon)

5 April 2023 2024 AFC Olympic qualification	Lebanon	1–5	Chinese Taipei	Jounieh, Lebanon
14:30 UTC+3	Khoury 9'	Report	Hsu Yi-yun 26'; Chang Su-hsin 30', 45'; Ting Chi 32', 90+4'	Stadium: Fouad Chehab Stadium; Attendance: 250; Referee: Veronika Bernatskaya (Kyrgyz Republic)

8 April 2023 2024 AFC Olympic qualification	Indonesia	0–5	Lebanon	Jounieh, Lebanon
14:30 UTC+3		Report	Iskandar 29', 79'; Khoury 45+2'; Bou Rada 59'; Maalouf 69'	Stadium: Fouad Chehab Stadium; Referee: Nguyen Thi Hang Nga (Vietnam)

18 July 2023 Friendly	Lebanon	5–0	Palestine	Ansar, Lebanon
17:30 UTC+3	Awad 23', 25'; Iskandar 58'; Fayad 82'; Maalouf 87'	Report		Stadium: Ansar Stadium

21 July 2023 Friendly	Lebanon	2–1	Palestine	Tripoli, Lebanon
17:30 UTC+3	Tamim 30', 56'	Report		Stadium: Tripoli Municipal Stadium

18 September 2023 2023 SAFF Tournament GS	Lebanon	4–1	Laos	Taif, Saudi Arabia
17:30 UTC+3	Arabi 13'; C. Iskandar 60'; Raed 65'; L. Iskandar 70'		Chinda 81'	Stadium: King Fahd Sports City; Referee: Nodira Mirzoeva (Tajikistan)

21 September 2023 2023 SAFF Tournament GS	Bhutan	2–3	Lebanon	Taif, Saudi Arabia
17:30 UTC+3	Lhazom 82', 86' (pen.)		L. Iskandar 30'; Salha 61'; Awad 64'	Stadium: King Fahd Sports City; Referee: Shahenda El Maghrabi (Egypt)

27 September 2023 2023 SAFF Tournament SF	Lebanon	0–0 (a.e.t.) (4–3 p)	Malaysia	Taif, Saudi Arabia
17:30 UTC+3		Report		Stadium: King Fahd Sports City; Referee: Khuloud AlZaabi (United Arab Emirates)
	Penalties
	L. Iskandar (penalty scored); Salha (penalty missed); Abdin (penalty scored); C. Iskandar (penalty missed); Awad (penalty missed); Arabi (penalty missed); Bou Hamra (penalty scored); Al Kasti (penalty scored)		(penalty scored) Sarge; (penalty missed) Sarah; (penalty missed) Arissa; (penalty scored) Soberi; (penalty missed) Saidin; (penalty missed) Mazlan; (penalty scored) Usman; (penalty missed) Irdina

30 September 2023 2023 SAFF Tournament F	Lebanon	1–0	Bhutan	Taif, Saudi Arabia
--:-- UTC+3	L. Iskandar 102'	Report		Stadium: King Fahd Sports City

=== 2024 ===
13 February 2024 Friendly	Lebanon	1–0	Syria	Jounieh, Lebanon
14:00 UTC+2	Salha 17'	Report		Stadium: Fouad Chehab Stadium

15 February 2024 Friendly	Lebanon	3–1	Syria	Beirut, Lebanon
19:00 UTC+2	Bou Rada 20'; Tamim 52'; Kasti 76'	Report	Mustafa 82'	Stadium: Safa Stadium

19 February 2024 2024 WAFF Championship GS	Guam	3–4	Lebanon	Jeddah, Saudi Arabia
17:00 UTC+3	Bartosh 8', 18'; Anaya 84'	Report	L. Iskandar 49', 89', 90+4'; Maalouf 74'	Stadium: King Abdullah Sports City Reserve Stadium; Referee: Khuloud Al-Zaabi (United Arab Emirates)

21 February 2024 2024 WAFF Championship GS	Lebanon	3–2	Saudi Arabia	Jeddah, Saudi Arabia
20:00 UTC+3	Maalouf 3'; Saud 7' (o.g.); Salha 38' (pen.)	Report	Abdulrazak 64'; Tawfiq 81'	Stadium: King Abdullah Sports City Reserve Stadium; Referee: Ahmed Gatea (Iraq)

23 February 2024 2024 WAFF Championship GS	Lebanon	0–2	Jordan	Jeddah, Saudi Arabia
17:00 UTC+3		Report	Hazem 65'; Feras 80'	Stadium: King Abdullah Sports City Reserve Stadium; Referee: Muath Owfi (Palestine)

27 February 2024 2024 WAFF Championship SF	Nepal	2–1	Lebanon	Jeddah, Saudi Arabia
20:00 UTC+3	Bhandari 76'; Rai 90+4'	Report	P. Rana 37' (o.g.)	Stadium: Prince Abdullah Al-Faisal Sports City; Referee: Ahmed Saad (Bahrain)

=== 2025 ===
17 February 2025 2025 Vianet Championship	Myanmar	3–1	Lebanon	Kathmandu, Nepal
13:30 UTC+5:45	Win Theingi Tun 57'; Shwe Yee Tun 72'; San Thaw Thaw 75'	Report	Iskandar 61'	Stadium: Dasharath Rangasala; Referee: Anjana Rai (Nepal)

20 February 2025 2025 Vianet Championship	Lebanon	0–1	Nepal	Kathmandu, Nepal
17:30 UTC+5:45		Report	Bhandari 42'	Stadium: Dasharath Rangasala; Attendance: 11,473; Referee: Tekcham Ranjita Devi (India)

23 February 2025 2025 Vianet Championship	Kyrgyzstan	0–2	Lebanon	Kathmandu, Nepal
13:30 UTC+5:45		Report	Maalouf 13'; Mhanna 21'	Stadium: Dasharath Rangasala; Referee: Anjana Rai (Nepal)

5 April 2025 Friendly	Lebanon	1–1	Comoros	Beirut, Lebanon
15:00 UTC+3	Maalouf 74'	Report	Chamsoudine 90+4'	Stadium: Champville Stadium

7 April 2025 Friendly	Lebanon	4–0	Comoros	Jounieh, Lebanon
14:00 UTC+3	Al Kasti 23'; Khoury 28'; Maalouf 37', 65'	Report		Stadium: Fouad Chehab Stadium

29 May 2025 Friendly	Lebanon	1–1	Palestine	Beirut, Lebanon
18:00 UTC+3	Iskandar 70'	Report	Youssef 45+6'	Stadium: Champville Stadium; Referee: Alesar Baddour (Syria)

1 June 2025 Friendly	Lebanon	2–1	Palestine	Jounieh, Lebanon
17:00 UTC+3	Salha 52'; Iskandar 88'	Report	Nasr 70'	Stadium: Fouad Chehab Stadium

7 July 2025 2026 Asian Cup qualification	Lebanon	0–4	Jordan	Amman, Jordan
19:00 UTC+3		Report	Jbarah 8', 20'; Al-Bitar 32'; Abu Tayeh 77'	Stadium: King Abdullah II Stadium; Referee: Rebecca Durcau (Australia)

10 July 2025 2026 Asian Cup qualification	Bhutan	2–1	Lebanon	Amman, Jordan
19:00 UTC+3	Tshering 45+2', 86'	Report	Khoury 81'	Stadium: King Abdullah II Stadium; Referee: Supiree Testhomya (Thailand)

16 July 2025 2026 Asian Cup qualification	Lebanon	3–1	Iran	Amman, Jordan
16:00 UTC+3	Maalouf 5', 22', 71'	Report	Shaban 57'	Stadium: King Abdullah II Stadium; Referee: Plong Pich Akara (Cambodia)

19 July 2025 2026 Asian Cup qualification	Singapore	0–1	Lebanon	Amman, Jordan
16:00 UTC+3		Report	Iskandar 64'	Stadium: King Abdullah II Stadium; Referee: Supiree Testhomya (Thailand)

26 November 2025 2025 WAFF Championship GS	Lebanon	0–3	Palestine	Jeddah, Saudi Arabia
19:45 UTC+3		Report	Kord 11'; Osorio 23'; Qassis 56'	Stadium: Hall Stadium – King Abdullah Sports City; Referee: Alesar Baddour (Syria)

28 November 2025 2025 WAFF Championship GS	Jordan	5–0	Lebanon	Jeddah, Saudi Arabia
16:45 UTC+3	Sweilem 17'; Tamimi 29'; Al-Fararjeh 38'; Arabi 43' (o.g.); Abu Tayeh 54'	Report		Stadium: Hall Stadium – King Abdullah Sports City; Referee: Rawdha Al-Mansoori (United Arab Emirates)

=== 2026 ===
10 October 2026 Friendly	Lebanon	1–1	Palestine	Jounieh, Lebanon
14:00 UTC+3	Iskandar 79'	Report	Abu Asfar 4'	Stadium: Fouad Chehab Stadium; Referee: Doumouh Al Bakkar (Lebanon)

13 October 2026 Friendly	Lebanon	2–1	Palestine	Jounieh, Lebanon
14:00 UTC+3	Salha 26'; Maalouf 33'	Report	Al Shaikh 86'	Stadium: Fouad Chehab Stadium; Referee: Karim Chehade (Lebanon)

== See also ==
- Lebanon national football team results
- List of Lebanon women's national football team managers
