= Kyrgyzstan women's national football team results =

This article provides details of international football games played by the Kyrgyzstan women's national football team from 2009 to the present day.

== Result ==
Key
Win
Draw
Defeat

=== 2009 ===
25 April 2010 AFC Women's Asian Cup qualification	Kyrgyzstan	1–7	Jordan	KLFA Stadium, Kuala Lumpur
17:00 UTC+8	Pokachalova 75'	Report	Al-Azab 1'; Al-Naber 11', 38'; Taalaibek 14' (o.g.); Jbarah 18', 36'; Jebreen 90+2'	Attendance: 100; Referee: Kamnueng Pannipar (Thailand)

27 April 2010 AFC Women's Asian Cup qualification	Palestine	1–4	Kyrgyzstan	KLFA Stadium, Kuala Lumpur
19:30 UTC+8	Shaheen 90'	Report	Litvinenko 7', 53', 81'; Pokachalova 55'	Attendance: 100; Referee: Ri Hyang Ok (Korea DPR)

1 May 2010 AFC Women's Asian Cup qualification	Kyrgyzstan	0–2	Uzbekistan	KLFA Stadium, Kuala Lumpur
19:30 UTC+8		Report	Usmanova 75'; Abdurasulova 90+2'	Attendance: 60; Referee: Shen Huangying (China)

3 May 2010 AFC Women's Asian Cup qualification	Maldives	0–2	Kyrgyzstan	KLFA Stadium, Kuala Lumpur
17:00 UTC+8		Report	Pokachalova 8', 90+1'	Attendance: 70; Referee: Rita Gani (Malaysia)

4 July 2010 AFC Women's Asian Cup qualification	Kyrgyzstan	1–10	Vietnam	Thành Long Sports Centre, Ho Chi Minh City
15:30 UTC+7	Pokachalova 78' (pen.)	Report	Kim Chi 10'; Ngọc Châm 21', 24', 57', 62', 72', 87'; Nguyễn Thị Nga 28'; Minh Nguyệt 59'; Lê Thị Oanh 83'	Attendance: 500; Referee: Hong Eun-Ah (Korea Republic)

6 July 2010 AFC Women's Asian Cup qualification	Hong Kong	2–0	Kyrgyzstan	Thành Long Sports Centre, Ho Chi Minh City
15:30 UTC+7	Fung 48'; Ng Wing Kum 50'	Report		Attendance: 150; Referee: Li Hong (China)

=== 2013 ===
22 May 2014 AFC Women's Asian Cup qualification	Hong Kong	2–1	Kyrgyzstan	Bahrain National Stadium, Riffa
20:00	Cheung Wai Ki 41', 86'	Report	Tynkova 59'	Attendance: 60; Referee: Shiva Yari (Iran)

24 May 2014 AFC Women's Asian Cup qualification	Kyrgyzstan	0–12	Vietnam	Bahrain National Stadium, Riffa
20:30		Report	Minh Nguyệt 3', 12', 22'; Ngọc Anh 5'; Thị Xuyến 14'; Thị Hòa 23', 71'; Thị Muôn 35'; Kim Tiến 50'; Kim Hồng 65'; Huỳnh Như 81', 88'	Attendance: 50; Referee: Li Juan (China)

26 May 2014 AFC Women's Asian Cup qualification	Kyrgyzstan	1–4	Bahrain	Bahrain National Stadium, Riffa
20:30	Tynkova 31'	Report	Abdelrahman 3', 33'; Al Hashmi 20', 49'	Attendance: 150; Referee: Shiva Yari (Iran)

=== 2015 ===
22 May 2015 Friendly	Bahrain	2–0	Kyrgyzstan	Manama, Bahrain
		Report

25 May 2015 Friendly	Bahrain	1–0	Kyrgyzstan	Manama, Bahrain
		Report

=== 2017 ===
28 February 2017 Friendly	Tajikistan	1–1	Kyrgyzstan	Almaty, Kazakhstan
		Report

17 August 2017 2017 KFU 3-Nations Cup	Kyrgyzstan	1–3	Uzbekistan	Bishkek, Kyrgyzstan
		Report

20 August 2017 2017 KFU 3-Nations Cup	Kyrgyzstan	0–1	Uzbekistan	Bishkek, Kyrgyzstan
		Report

14 September 2017 Friendly	Kazakhstan	1–0	Kyrgyzstan	Nur-Sultan, Kazakhstan
13:00 UTC+3		Report

=== 2018 ===
23 November 2018 CAFA Women's Championship	Tajikistan	1–0	Kyrgyzstan	Milliy Stadium, Tashkent
13:00	Fazilova 90+5'

27 November 2018 CAFA Women's Championship	Kyrgyzstan	1–0	Afghanistan	Milliy Stadium, Tashkent
13:00

29 November 2018 CAFA Women's Championship	Kyrgyzstan	0–10	Uzbekistan	Milliy Stadium, Tashkent
13:00			Turdiboeva 3'; Shoyimova 6'; Karachik 12', 20'; Kurbonova 42', 64'; Kudratova 49'; Amirova 52'; Erkinova 76'; Nozimova 87'

1 December 2018 CAFA Women's Championship	Iran	5–0	Kyrgyzstan	Milliy Stadium, Tashkent
16:00

=== 2019 ===
1 December 2019 2019 Cup of Hope	Kyrgyzstan	2–8	Nepal	Central Stadium, Karakol
16:00	Boronbekova 19'; Aiperi 22'	Report	Bhandari 3', 15', 30', 54'; Basnet 24', 89'; Rai 25'; Thapa 37'

9 December 2019 2019 Cup of Hope	Kyrgyzstan	1–2	Tajikistan	Central Stadium, Karakol
		Report

10 December 2019 2019 Cup of Hope	Kyrgyzstan	0–9	Uzbekistan	Central Stadium, Karakol
		Report

12 December 2019 2019 Cup of Hope 3rd Place	Kyrgyzstan	2–0	Tajikistan	Central Stadium, Karakol
	Boronbekova (??); Aitbaeva (??)	Report

=== 2022 ===
8 July 2022 2022 CAFA Women's Championship	Kyrgyzstan	0–1	Iran	Dushanbe, Tajikistan
19:00 UTC+5		Report	Behesht 52'	Stadium: Republic Central Stadium; Referee: Anna Sidorova (Uzbekistan)

11 July 2022 2022 CAFA Women's Championship	Turkmenistan	0–0	Kyrgyzstan	Dushanbe, Tajikistan
19:00 UTC+5		Report		Stadium: Republic Central Stadium; Referee: Mahsa Ghorbani (Iran)

17 July 2022 2022 CAFA Women's Championship	Kyrgyzstan	0–7	Uzbekistan	Dushanbe, Tajikistan
22:00 UTC+5		Report	Kudratova 6', 39'; Irisboeva 10', 56'; Khikmatova 45+1'; Khabibullaeva 78'; Mamatkarimova 81'	Stadium: Republic Central Stadium; Referee: Mahsa Ghorbani (Iran)

20 July 2022 2022 CAFA Women's Championship	Tajikistan	0–1	Kyrgyzstan	Dushanbe, Tajikistan
22:00 UTC+5		Report	Karataeva 20'	Stadium: Republic Central Stadium; Referee: Anna Sidorova (Uzbekistan)

=== 2023 ===
4 April 2023 2024 AFC Women's Olympic Qualifying Group G	Kyrgyzstan	0–5	India	Bishkek, Kyrgyzstan
20:00 UTC+6		Report	Tamang 6', 43'; Guguloth 45+3'; S. Devi 61'; Renu 63'	Stadium: Dolen Omurzakov Stadium; Attendance: 354; Referee: Pansa Chaisanit (Thailand)

7 April 2023 2024 AFC Women's Olympic Qualifying Group G	India	4–0	Kyrgyzstan	Bishkek, Kyrgyzstan
20:00 UTC+6	Sandhiya 18', 56'; Tamang 24'; Renu 85'	Report		Stadium: Dolen Omurzakov Stadium; Referee: Kim Yu-jeong (South Korea)

=== 2025 ===
17 February 2025 Vianet Championship	Nepal	1–0	Kyrgyzstan	Kathmandu, Nepal
17:30 UTC+5:45	Chaudhary 9'	Report		Stadium: Dasharath Rangasala; Attendance: 7,416; Referee: Kanika Barman (India)

20 February 2025 Vianet Championship	Kyrgyzstan	0–5	Myanmar	Kathmandu, Nepal
13:30 UTC+5:45		Report	Yoon Wadi Hlaing 2', 41'; Sandar Lin 30'; May Htet Lu 36', 49'	Stadium: Dasharath Rangasala; Referee: Umesh Bidari (Nepal)

23 February 2025 Vianet Championship	Kyrgyzstan	0–2	Lebanon	Kathmandu, Nepal
13:30 UTC+5:45		Report	Maalouf 13'; Mehanna 21'	Stadium: Dasharath Rangasala; Referee: Anjana Rai (Nepal)

25 May Friendly	Kazakhstan	3–1	Kyrgyzstan	Almaty, Kazakhstan
15:00 UTC+5	Berikova 23', 42', 67'		Kaznacheeva 44'	Stadium: Almaty Central Stadium

28 May Friendly	Kazakhstan	2–1	Kyrgyzstan	Almaty, Kazakhstan
15:00 UTC+5	Bibossynova 20'; Rakhatzhan 51'		Turalieva 19'	Stadium: Almaty Central Stadium

29 June 2026 AFC Women's Asian Cup qualification	Indonesia	1–0	Kyrgyzstan	Tangerang Regency, Indonesia
20:00 UTC+7	Warps 62'	Report		Stadium: Indomilk Arena; Referee: Casey Reibelt (Australia)

2 July 2026 AFC Women's Asian Cup qualification	Kyrgyzstan	0–3	Chinese Taipei	Tangerang Regency, Indonesia
15:30 UTC+7		Report	Su Sin-Yun 45'; Su Yu-Hsuan 65'; Matsunaga 70' (pen.)	Stadium: Indomilk Arena; Referee: Ranjita Devi Tekcham (India)

5 July 2026 AFC Women's Asian Cup qualification	Kyrgyzstan	1–2	Pakistan	Tangerang Regency, Indonesia
15:30 UTC+7	Alina Gaparova 69'	Report	Mahmood 4', 26' (pen.)	Stadium: Indomilk Arena

=== 2026 ===
2 March 2026 Friendly	Saudi Arabia	2–0	Kyrgyzstan	Khobar, Saudi Arabia
22:00 UTC+3	Mukhayzin 8'; Khalid 35'	Report		Stadium: Prince Saud bin Jalawi Sports City Stadium

6 March 2026 Friendly	Saudi Arabia	3–0	Kyrgyzstan	Khobar, Saudi Arabia
22:00 UTC+3	Abdullah 22', 28', 53'	Report		Stadium: Prince Saud bin Jalawi Sports City Stadium

4 June Friendly	Bahrain	0–5	Kyrgyzstan	Manama, Bahrain
19:00 UTC+3			Saiakbaeva 21', 39'; Boronbekova 30', 52'; Ishembieva 60'	Stadium: BFA Outdoor Pitches; Referee: Alissar Baddour (Syria)

7 June Friendly	Bahrain	0–4	Kyrgyzstan	Manama, Bahrain
19:00 UTC+3			Turalieva 65'; Kurmanbekova 72'; Murzakulova 80'; Asanbekova 90+5'	Stadium: BFA Outdoor Pitches

== See also ==
- Kyrgyzstan national football team results
