= Nadine Schtakleff =

Lebanese footballer (born 1985)

Personal information
- Full name: Nadine Nabil Schtakleff
- Date of birth: 9 February 1985 (age 41)
- Place of birth: Beirut, Lebanon
- Position: Midfielder

Senior career*
Years	Team	Apps	(Gls)
2007	Ansar		
2009	Abu Dhabi Country Club		
2011	King Raiders		

International career
2007–2013	Lebanon	5+	(2)
Medal record
Women's football
Representing Lebanon
WAFF Women's Championship
Bronze medal – third place	2007
- * Club domestic league appearances and goals

Nadine Nabil Schtakleff (Arabic: نادين نبيل شتاكليف; born 9 February 1985) is a Lebanese former footballer who played as a midfielder.

At club level, Schtakleff played for teams in Lebanon and the United Arab Emirates, and won the 2011 National Amateur Football League with King Raiders. She played for the Lebanon national team between 2007 and 2013.

== Early life ==
Schtakleff was born Beirut, Lebanon, and moved to the United Arab Emirates when she was a few weeks old. She grew up in Abu Dhabi, where she attended school, and began playing football at the age of six. As there were no girls' teams available at her school, she initially played with boys. She later studied finance at a university in Lebanon and worked as a banker.

== Club career ==
Schtakleff played for Lebanese club Ansar since their formation in 2007. She subsequently played for Abu Dhabi Health and Fitness Club in the UAE. In 2009, she described the club as effectively serving as the UAE women's national team, and said she trained with it several times a week.

In 2011, she played for Emirati side King Raiders in the National Amateur Football Championship, helping them win the league title after scoring both goals in a 2–0 win in the final against Falcons.

== International career ==
Schtakleff represented Lebanon at the 2007 WAFF Women's Championship, making two appearances in the tournament. She later played in all three of Lebanon's matches in the qualifying competition for the 2014 AFC Women's Asian Cup. She scored twice in a 12–1 victory over Kuwait on 9 June 2013, scoring in the 29th and 77th minutes. She was also the team captain for a few years.

== Personal life ==
In 2009, Schtakleff worked as a team liaison assistant for New Zealand club Auckland City FC during the 2009 FIFA Club World Cup, which was held in the UAE. She helped the club's staff and players with communication and translation, and also participated in a training session with the team.

In 2017, she joined the Equal Playing Field initiative, which brought together 30 women footballers for an expedition to climb Mount Kilimanjaro and promote gender equality in sport. The initiative profiled her experience playing football in Lebanon and the UAE. That year, she was also selected by Nike Middle East to appear in a promotional video about female athletes in the Arab world.

== Career statistics ==
=== International ===
Scores and results list Lebanon's goal tally first, score column indicates score after each Schtakleff goal.

List of international goals scored by Nadine Nabil Schtakleff
No.	Date	Venue	Opponent	Score	Result	Competition	Ref.
1	9 June 2013	Amman International Stadium, Amman, Jordan	Kuwait	4–0	12–1	2014 AFC Women's Asian Cup qualification	
2	9 June 2013	Amman International Stadium, Amman, Jordan	Kuwait	10–0	12–1	2014 AFC Women's Asian Cup qualification	

== Honours ==
King Raiders

- National Amateur Football League: 2011

Lebanon

- WAFF Women's Championship third place: 2007

== See also ==
- List of Lebanon women's international footballers
