= Taghrid Hamadeh =

Lebanese football and futsal player (born 1988)

Personal information
- Date of birth: 1 June 1988 (age 38)
- Place of birth: Kmatieh, Lebanon
- Position: Defender

Senior career*
| Years | Team | Apps | (Gls) |
| 2008–2014 | Sadaka | 16 | (4) |
| 2015 | GFA | | |
| 2019–2022 | ÓBerytus | 8 | (0) |
| 2022 | BFA | 3 | (0) |

International career
| 2008–2018 | Lebanon (futsal) | | (6) |
| 2006–2015 | Lebanon | 22 | (2) |
Medal record
Women's football
Representing Lebanon
WAFF Women's Championship
| Bronze medal – third place | 2007 |
- * Club domestic league appearances and goals

Taghrid Hamadeh (Arabic: تغريد حمادة; born 1 June 1988) is a Lebanese former football and futsal player who played as a defender. She represented the Lebanese national team in both football and futsal.

== Club career ==
Hamadeh played for Sadaka from 2008 to 2014. She captained the team in the 2009 Lebanese Women's Cup final, in which Sadaka defeated Ansar 3–0 to retain the title. She also played futsal for Sadaka. In 2014, she scored the opening goal in a women's futsal final against SAS before being sent off after receiving a second yellow card. Sadaka went on to win the inaugural Lebanese Women's Futsal League title that year.

After Sadaka withdrew from the futsal competition, Hamadeh and several teammates moved to Shooters in 2015. In April that year, she stated in an interview that the team had been training two or three times a week before suspending its sessions during the national team's preparations for the Aphrodite Cup.

Hamadeh subsequently played for ÓBerytus in the Lebanese Women's Football League and for Beirut Football Academy (BFA).

== International career ==
=== Football ===
Hamadeh represented Lebanon at the 2006 Arab Championship, the 2007 WAFF Championship, the 2010 Arabia Cup, the 2011 WAFF Championship and the 2014 AFC Asian Cup qualifiers, as well as in international friendlies and the 2015 Aphrodite Cup. She made 22 appearances for the senior national team between 2006 and 2015, scoring twice.

At the 2007 WAFF Women's Championship, Hamadeh helped Lebanon finish third. She also scored in the tournament, in which Lebanon recorded its first win against Jordan in the competition. During the 2014 AFC Women's Asian Cup qualification campaign, Hamadeh scored in Lebanon's 12–1 victory over Kuwait on 9 June 2013.

Hamadeh was joint Lebanon's most-capped women's football international, alongside Sara Bakri, with 22 appearances, until Rana Al Mokdad surpassed the record in September 2023.

=== Futsal ===
Hamadeh also represented Lebanon in women's futsal. She was included in the Lebanese team for the 2008 WAFF Futsal Championship, appearing in the squad named for the 7–0 victory over Iraq. She later represented Lebanon at the 2012 WAFF Futsal Championship and the 2018 AFC Futsal Championship.

== Personal life ==
In an interview in 2015, Hamadeh described futsal as more competitive than association football, citing the closer standard between teams and greater interest from the Lebanese Football Association. She also discussed the development of women's football in Lebanon, highlighting the introduction of youth teams and the importance of media coverage for the women's game.

== Career statistics ==
=== International ===
Scores and results list Lebanon's goal tally first, score column indicates score after each Hamadeh goal.

List of international goals scored by Taghrid Hamadeh
| No. | Date | Venue | Opponent | Score | Result | Competition | Ref. |
|---|---|---|---|---|---|---|---|
| 1 | 7 September 2007 | Amman International Stadium, Amman, Jordan | Syria | | 7–0 | 2007 WAFF Women's Championship | |
| 2 | 9 June 2013 | Amman International Stadium, Amman, Jordan | Kuwait | 9–0 | 12–1 | 2014 AFC Women's Asian Cup qualification | |

== Honours ==
Sadaka

- Lebanese Women's Cup: 2008, 2009
- Lebanese Women's Futsal League: 2014

Lebanon

- WAFF Women's Championship third place: 2007

== See also ==
- List of Lebanon women's international footballers
