= Hiba El Jaafil =

Lebanese football player and coach (born 1987)

Personal information
- Date of birth: 7 January 1987 (age 39)
- Place of birth: Sidon, Lebanon
- Position: Midfielder

Youth career
- 2002–2006: Sadaka
- 2006–2007: Arz

Senior career*
Years	Team	Apps	(Gls)
2007–2015	Shabab Arabi		

International career
- Lebanon U15
2008	Lebanon (futsal)	1+	(2)
2006–2013	Lebanon	14+	(3)

Managerial career
- 2014–2016: Lebanon U19 (women)
- 2014–2016: Lebanon U17 (women)
- 2015: Lebanon (women)
Medal record
Women's football
Representing Lebanon
WAFF Women's Championship
Bronze medal – third place	2007
- * Club domestic league appearances and goals

Hiba El Jaafil (Arabic: هبة الجعفيل; born 7 January 1987) is a Lebanese football manager and former player who played as a midfielder. She is also a former futsal player, and represented Lebanon internationally in both football and futsal.

== Early life ==
El Jaafil was born in Sidon and grew up in the Ouzai district of Beirut. She began playing football in her neighbourhood at the age of seven. At the time, women's football in Lebanon was played by a small number of clubs and had limited organisational support.

== Club career ==
At the age of 15, El Jaafil joined Majd, which became Sadaka within a year. She played for Sadaka for four years before joining Arz, where she spent a season. She subsequently moved to Shabab Arabi, later also referred to as Arabi Tripoli in contemporary Lebanese coverage.

In 2011, she moved to Abu Dhabi, United Arab Emirates, where she played in a Ramadan tournament for the Armed Forces Club before joining another local club for a season. She later returned to Lebanon and continued her involvement in football as a player and coach. In a 2015 interview, she was identified as a player for Shabab Arabi while also coaching the national youth teams.

== International career ==
El Jaafil represented Lebanon in both association football and futsal. She became captain of the national football team and also captained the national futsal team. She was among the players who represented Lebanon in its early women's international matches, beginning in the mid-2000s.

In association football, she represented Lebanon at the 2007 WAFF Women's Championship, where the team finished third, and later played in the 2014 AFC Women's Asian Cup qualifiers. During the qualifiers, she scored in a 12–1 victory over Kuwait on 9 June 2013.

El Jaafil also represented Lebanon at the 2008 WAFF Women's Futsal Championship.

== Managerial career ==
El Jaafil obtained coaching qualifications from the Asian Football Confederation (AFC), completing the C and B licences before earning the A licence in 2014. She later also obtained a B licence from the German Football Association (DFB).

In July 2014, she became the first head coach of the Lebanon women's under-19 team. She subsequently took charge of the under-17 team in September 2014. Her first major assignment with the under-19 side was the 2015 AFC U-19 Women's Championship qualifiers in Jordan, where she selected a relatively young squad as part of a longer-term development plan. In February 2015, she led Lebanon's under-17 team to victory at the 2015 Arab U-17 Women's Cup in Qatar, securing the country's first Arab women's youth title.

Following the tournament, she was also appointed coach of the senior women's national team. She led Lebanon at the 2015 Aphrodite Women Cup in Cyprus, where the team played four matches. She stopped coaching the national teams in 2016 due to problems with the Lebanese Football Association.

In June 2015, El Jaafil told Al-Joumhouria that she had faced opposition from some members of the football community when she began coaching, but that she wanted to encourage more women to enter the profession. She also emphasised the importance of continuous training, friendly matches and adequate funding for youth development.

== Personal life ==
After her time with the national teams, El Jaafil became involved in football-based community projects. Following the 2015 Aphrodite Cup, she joined a project supported by the German Embassy in Lebanon, UNICEF and the Lebanese Ministry of Education, which aimed to establish mixed boys' and girls' football teams in 90 public schools hosting Lebanese and refugee children. The programme included training sessions and a nationwide tournament.

She subsequently worked with the international organisation streetfootballworld (now Common Goal), delivering workshops and teaching its football methodology in Lebanon and elsewhere in the Middle East. She also worked as a sports coordinator at a school in Lebanon, organising football and basketball academies, and collaborated with organisations including Discover Football and Women Win.

In 2022, she founded the non-governmental organisation Unity for Change, which focused on gender equality, fair play and recreational and social activities for children. The organisation initially operated with a group of volunteers and developed projects in cooperation with organisations including the German development agency GIZ and Orienthelfer.

El Jaafil also served as an ambassador for the Generation Amazing programme during the 2022 FIFA World Cup in Qatar. In 2025, she said that she was living in Germany after travelling there with her family in 2024, following the outbreak of the 2024 war in Lebanon.

== Career statistics ==
=== International ===
Scores and results list Lebanon's goal tally first, score column indicates score after each El Jaafil goal.

List of international goals scored by Hiba El Jaafil
No.	Date	Venue	Opponent	Score	Result	Competition	Ref.
1	23 October 2010	Bahrain National Stadium, Riffa, Bahrain	Iraq	?–0	9–0	2010 Arabia Women's Cup	
2	23 October 2010	Bahrain National Stadium, Riffa, Bahrain	Iraq	?–0	9–0	2010 Arabia Women's Cup	
3	9 June 2013	Amman International Stadium, Amman, Jordan	Kuwait	3–0	12–1	2014 AFC Women's Asian Cup qualification	

== Honours ==
=== Player ===
Lebanon

- WAFF Women's Championship third place: 2007

=== Manager ===
Lebanon U17

- Arab U-17 Women's Cup: 2015

== See also ==
- List of Lebanon women's international footballers
- List of Lebanon women's national football team managers
