= Kamola Riskieva =

Uzbekistani footballer

Personal information
- Full name: Kamola Riskieva
- Date of birth: 8 July 1992 (age 34)
- Place of birth: Tashkent, Uzbekistan
- Position: Defender

International career^{‡}
Years	Team	Apps	(Gls)
2009–	Uzbekistan	3	(0)
- ‡ National team caps and goals as of 22:52, 20 March 2015 (UTC)

Kamola Riskieva is an Uzbekistani women's football defender.

== International goals ==
No.	Date	Venue	Opponent	Score	Result	Competition
1.	22 March 2011	Bangabandhu National Stadium, Dhaka, Bangladesh	India	1–1	1–1	2012 Summer Olympics qualification
2.	5 June 2013	Amman International Stadium, Amman, Jordan	Kuwait	5–0	18–0	2014 AFC Women's Asian Cup qualification
3.	11 March 2015	Petra Stadium, Amman, Jordan	Palestine	3–0	6–0	2016 AFC Women's Olympic Qualifying Tournament
4.	13 March 2015	Petra Stadium, Amman, Jordan	Hong Kong	1–0	1–0	2016 AFC Women's Olympic Qualifying Tournament

== See also ==
- List of Uzbekistan women's international footballers
