= Tanzilya Zarbieva =

Uzbekistani footballer

Personal information
- Full name: Tanzilya Shamilevna Zarbiyeva
- Date of birth: 8 February 1991 (age 35)
- Place of birth: Jizzakh, Soviet Union (now Uzbekistan)
- Position: Defender

International career^{‡}
| Years | Team | Apps | (Gls) |
| 2009– | Uzbekistan | 16 | (1) |
- ‡ National team caps and goals as of 9 April 2019

Tanzilya Zarbieva (born 8 February 1991) is an Uzbekistani footballer who plays as a defender for the Uzbekistan women's national team.

== International goals ==
| No. | Date | Venue | Opponent | Score | Result | Competition |
|---|---|---|---|---|---|---|
| 1. | 5 June 2013 | Amman International Stadium, Amman, Jordan | Kuwait | 18–0 | 18–0 | 2014 AFC Women's Asian Cup qualification |

== See also ==
- List of Uzbekistan women's international footballers
