= Zebo Juraeva =

Uzbekistani footballer

Personal information
- Full name: Zebo Juraeva
- Place of birth: G'uzor, Uzbekistan
- Position: Forward

Senior career*
Years	Team	Apps	(Gls)
	Sevinch		(64)

International career^{‡}
2009–13	Uzbekistan	8	(10)
- * Club domestic league appearances and goals ‡ National team caps and goals as of 22:58, 20 March 2015 (UTC)

Zebo Juraeva is an Uzbekistani women's football forward.

== International goals ==
No.	Date	Venue	Opponent	Score	Result	Competition
1.	6 July 2009	Rajamangala Stadium, Bangkok, Thailand	Iran	2–1	4–1	2010 AFC Women's Asian Cup qualification
2.	5 June 2013	Amman International Stadium, Amman, Jordan	Kuwait	1–0	18–0	2014 AFC Women's Asian Cup qualification
3.	5 June 2013	Amman International Stadium, Amman, Jordan	Kuwait	3–0	18–0	2014 AFC Women's Asian Cup qualification
4.	5 June 2013	Amman International Stadium, Amman, Jordan	Kuwait	4–0	18–0	2014 AFC Women's Asian Cup qualification
5.	5 June 2013	Amman International Stadium, Amman, Jordan	Kuwait	8–0	18–0	2014 AFC Women's Asian Cup qualification
6.	5 June 2013	Amman International Stadium, Amman, Jordan	Kuwait	11–0	18–0	2014 AFC Women's Asian Cup qualification
7.	5 June 2013	Amman International Stadium, Amman, Jordan	Kuwait	12–0	18–0	2014 AFC Women's Asian Cup qualification
8.	5 June 2013	Amman International Stadium, Amman, Jordan	Kuwait	13–0	18–0	2014 AFC Women's Asian Cup qualification
9.	5 June 2013	Amman International Stadium, Amman, Jordan	Kuwait	17–0	18–0	2014 AFC Women's Asian Cup qualification
10.	7 June 2013	Amman International Stadium, Amman, Jordan	Lebanon	2–0	4–0	2014 AFC Women's Asian Cup qualification

== See also ==
- List of Uzbekistan women's international footballers
