= List of Lebanon women's national football team managers =

The following table provides a summary of the complete record of each Lebanon women's national football team manager, including their progress in the World Cup, the Olympics, and the Asian Cup.

== Managers ==
Manager	Nationality	First match	Last match	Pld	W	D	L	W%	PPG (Note: According to the "three points for a win" standard)	Competitions
Vatche Sarkissian	Lebanon	16 April 2006	23 October 2010	10	3	0	7	30.00	0.90	
Izzat Khalil	Lebanon	15 September 2011	8 October 2011	5	1	0	4	20.00	0.60	
Farid Njeim	Lebanon	5 June 2013	9 June 2013	3	1	0	2	33.33	1.00	2014 Asian Cup – Did not qualify
Hiba El Jaafil	Lebanon	12 March 2015	18 March 2015	4	0	0	4	0.00	0.00	
Wael Gharzeddine (1)	Lebanon	21 March 2017	21 October 2021	16	6	1	9	37.50	1.19	2020 Olympics – Did not qualify 2022 Asian Cup – Did not qualify
Hagop Demirjian	Lebanon	12 August 2022	8 April 2023	9	4	1	4	44.44	1.44	2024 Olympics – Did not qualify
Jouana Hamze	Lebanon	18 July 2023	30 September 2023	6	5	1	0	83.33	2.67	
Wael Gharzeddine (2)	Lebanon	13 February 2024	present	21	10	3	8	47.64	1.57	2026 Asian Cup – Did not qualify
Totals				74	30	6	38	40.54	1.30	—

Last updated: Lebanon vs Palestine, 13 October 2026.

== See also ==
- List of Lebanon national football team managers
- Lebanon women's national football team results
