= Maysa Jbarah =

Jordanian footballer (born 1989)

Personal information
- Full name: Maysa Ziad Mahmoud Jbarah
- Date of birth: 20 September 1989 (age 37)
- Place of birth: Kuwait City, Kuwait
- Height: 1.70 m (5 ft 7 in)
- Position: Forward

Team information
- Current team: Amman

Youth career
- 2000–2005: Amman

Senior career*
Years	Team	Apps	(Gls)
2005–2007	Amman		
2007–2010	Sadaka		
2010–2016	Amman		
2016–2017	Abu Dhabi Ladies Club		
2017–2018	Zouk Mosbeh		
2018–2019	Grenoble	10	(4)
2019–2020	Thonon Évian	13	(5)
2021–2022	Ankara BB Fomget	24	(16)
2021	→ Amman (loan)		
2022–2024	Al Nassr	21	(14)
2024	Etihad Club		
2024–2025	Neom	14	(26)
2026	Amman	8	(5)

International career^{‡}
2005–	Jordan	153	(146)
- * Club domestic league appearances and goals ‡ National team caps and goals as of 7 October 2026

Maysa Ziad Mahmoud Jbarah (Arabic: ميساء زياد محمود جبارة; born 20 September 1989) is a footballer who plays as a forward for Amman. Born in Kuwait, she plays for the Jordan national team.

Jbarah is her country's top goal scorer and most-capped player. As of 2025, she is the fourth-highest goalscorer in women's international football.

== Club career ==
Jbarah began her career with Amman SC in 2000, before moving to Lebanese Women's Football League side Sadaka in 2007, remaining there until 2010, as she returned to her first club. In 2016, she moved to Abu Dhabi Ladies Club, staying one year, when she returned to Lebanon, signing for Zouk Mosbeh.

In 2018, Jbarah moved to France, at Grenoble for one season, and then joined Thonon Évian in 2019. In August 2021, she signed with Ankara BB Fomget to play in the Turkish Super League. She opened the 2021–22 league season scoring her team's first goal in the home match. She netted 16 goals in 24 league matches at the 2021–22 season. In November 2021, she played for Amman SC in the AFC Women's Club Championship, where she won the tournament scoring two goals, both from the penalty spot.

In 2022, Jbarah joined Saudi club Al Nassr, where she won consecutive league titles in 2022–23 and 2023–24. In summer 2024, she returned to Jordan to join Etihad Club. She later signed for Saudi club Neom, competing in the Saudi Women's First Division League, and helped the team earn promotion as champions by the end of the 2024–25 season.

== International career ==
Jbarah scored her first goal for the Jordan national team on her debut on 18 September 2005 in a friendly match which ended in a 6–1 win over Bahrain. At the 2010 Asian Games, she scored her country's only goal in a 10–1 defeat to hosts China. She also scored Jordan's first goal at the AFC Women's Asian Cup in the 2014 edition in a 3–1 defeat to hosts Vietnam.

== Career statistics ==
=== Club ===
Club	Season	Division	League		Cup		Continental		Total	
Club	Season	Division	Apps	Goals	Apps	Goals	Apps	Goals	Apps	Goals
Al Amman	2020-21	Jordan Women's Pro League					3	2	3	2
Al Amman	2026-27	Jordan Women's Pro League	8	5					8	5
Al Amman	Total		8	5			3	2	11	7
Grenoble	2018-19	Ligue 1 Féminin	10	4	1	0			11	4
Thonon Evian	2019-20	Ligue 1 Féminin	13	5	3	0			16	5
Ankara Fomget	2021-22	Kadın Super Lig	20	16					20	16
Ankara Fomget	2022-23	Kadın Super Lig	4	0					4	0
Ankara Fomget	Total		24	16					24	16
Al Nassr	2022-23	Saudi Women's Premier League	14	10					14	10
Al Nassr	2023-24	Saudi Women's Premier League	7	4					7	4
Al Nassr	Total		21	14					21	14
Ettifaq	2024-25	Jordanian Women's League					2	5	2	5
Neom	2024-25	Saudi Women's First Division League	14	26					14	26
Total career			90	70	4	0	5	7	99	77

=== International ===
As of match played 16 July 2025

Appearances and goals by national team and year
National team	Year	Apps	Goals
Jordan	2005	5	13
Jordan	2006	0	0
Jordan	2007	5	5
Jordan	2008	0	0
Jordan	2009	6	7
Jordan	2010	17	18
Jordan	2011	12	15
Jordan	2012	0	0
Jordan	2013	16	15
Jordan	2014	10	5
Jordan	2015	9	7
Jordan	2016	0	0
Jordan	2017	15	19
Jordan	2018	10	6
Jordan	2019	2	0
Jordan	2020	0	0
Jordan	2021	11	13
Jordan	2022	10	7
Jordan	2023	5	3
Jordan	2024	9	3
Jordan	2025	5	6
Total		148	143

Scores and results list Jordan's goal tally first, score column indicates score after each Jbarah goal.

List of international goals scored by Maysa Jbarah
No.	Date	Venue	Opponent	Score	Result	Competition
1	18 September 2005	Jordan	Bahrain	1–?	6–1	Friendly
2	18 September 2005	Jordan	Bahrain	2–?	6–1	Friendly
3	18 September 2005	Jordan	Bahrain	3–?	6–1	Friendly
4	23 September 2005	Amman International Stadium, Amman, Jordan	Palestine	1–0	9–0	2005 WAFF Championship
5	23 September 2005	Amman International Stadium, Amman, Jordan	Palestine	2–0	9–0	2005 WAFF Championship
6	23 September 2005	Amman International Stadium, Amman, Jordan	Palestine	5–0	9–0	2005 WAFF Championship
7	23 September 2005	Amman International Stadium, Amman, Jordan	Palestine	9–0	9–0	2005 WAFF Championship
8	25 September 2005	Amman International Stadium, Amman, Jordan	Bahrain	2–0	9–0	2005 WAFF Championship
9	25 September 2005	Amman International Stadium, Amman, Jordan	Bahrain	5–0	9–0	2005 WAFF Championship
10	25 September 2005	Amman International Stadium, Amman, Jordan	Bahrain	8–0	9–0	2005 WAFF Championship
11	27 September 2005	Amman International Stadium, Amman, Jordan	Syria	3–0	6–0	2005 WAFF Championship
12	1 October 2005	Amman International Stadium, Amman, Jordan	Iran	1–?	2–1	2005 WAFF Championship
13	1 October 2005	Amman International Stadium, Amman, Jordan	Iran	2–1	2–1	2005 WAFF Championship
14	12 August 2007	Iran	Iran	2–?	2–3	Friendly
15	3 September 2007	Amman, Jordan	Lebanon	3–0	3–0	2007 WAFF Championship
16	5 September 2007	Amman, Jordan	Syria	1–?	7–1	2007 WAFF Championship
17	5 September 2007	Amman, Jordan	Syria	2–?	7–1	2007 WAFF Championship
18	7 September 2007	Amman, Jordan	Iran	1–?	2–1	2007 WAFF Championship
19	25 April 2009	KLFA Stadium, Kuala Lumpur, Malaysia	Kyrgyzstan	4–0	7–1	2010 Asian Cup qualification
20	25 April 2009	KLFA Stadium, Kuala Lumpur, Malaysia	Kyrgyzstan	5–0	7–1	2010 Asian Cup qualification
21	29 April 2009	KLFA Stadium, Kuala Lumpur, Malaysia	Maldives	2–0	9–0	2010 Asian Cup qualification
22	29 April 2009	KLFA Stadium, Kuala Lumpur, Malaysia	Maldives	4–0	9–0	2010 Asian Cup qualification
23	1 May 2009	KLFA Stadium, Kuala Lumpur, Malaysia	Palestine	2–0	5–0	2010 Asian Cup qualification
24	1 May 2009	KLFA Stadium, Kuala Lumpur, Malaysia	Palestine	3–0	5–0	2010 Asian Cup qualification
25	3 May 2009	KLFA Stadium, Kuala Lumpur, Malaysia	Uzbekistan	2–2	2–2	2010 Asian Cup qualification
26	20 February 2010	Abu Dhabi, United Arab Emirates	Bahrain	4–?	4–1	2010 WAFF Championship
27	26 February 2010	Abu Dhabi, United Arab Emirates	Palestine	3–0	10–0	2010 WAFF Championship
28	26 February 2010	Abu Dhabi, United Arab Emirates	Palestine	5–0	10–0	2010 WAFF Championship
29	14 October 2010	Manama, Bahrain	Bahrain	1–?	4–1	Friendly
30	14 October 2010	Manama, Bahrain	Bahrain	3–?	4–1	Friendly
31	14 October 2010	Manama, Bahrain	Bahrain	4–?	4–1	Friendly
32	19 October 2010	Al Ahli Stadium, Manama, Bahrain	Iraq	3–0	20–0	2010 Arabia Cup
33	19 October 2010	Al Ahli Stadium, Manama, Bahrain	Iraq	4–0	20–0	2010 Arabia Cup
34	19 October 2010	Al Ahli Stadium, Manama, Bahrain	Iraq	8–0	20–0	2010 Arabia Cup
35	19 October 2010	Al Ahli Stadium, Manama, Bahrain	Iraq	11–0	20–0	2010 Arabia Cup
36	19 October 2010	Al Ahli Stadium, Manama, Bahrain	Iraq	14–0	20–0	2010 Arabia Cup
37	19 October 2010	Al Ahli Stadium, Manama, Bahrain	Iraq	15–0	20–0	2010 Arabia Cup
38	19 October 2010	Al Ahli Stadium, Manama, Bahrain	Iraq	16–0	20–0	2010 Arabia Cup
39	19 October 2010	Al Ahli Stadium, Manama, Bahrain	Iraq	17–0	20–0	2010 Arabia Cup
40	21 October 2010	Al Ahli Stadium, Manama, Bahrain	Lebanon	2–?	3–1	2010 Arabia Cup
41	21 October 2010	Al Ahli Stadium, Manama, Bahrain	Lebanon	3–?	3–1	2010 Arabia Cup
42	14 November 2010	University Town Stadium, Guangzhou, China	China	4–1	10–1	2010 Asian Games
43	28 December 2010	Jordan	Tunisia	3–?	4–4	Friendly
44	10 March 2011	Prince Mohammed Stadium, Zarqa, Jordan	Iran	1–0	1–1	2012 Olympics qualification
45	12 March 2011	Prince Mohammed Stadium, Zarqa, Jordan	Palestine	1–0	6–0	2012 Olympics qualification
46	12 March 2011	Prince Mohammed Stadium, Zarqa, Jordan	Palestine	4–0	6–0	2012 Olympics qualification
47	15 September 2011	Amman, Jordan	Lebanon	8–1	10–1	Friendly
48	15 September 2011	Amman, Jordan	Lebanon	9–1	10–1	Friendly
49	15 September 2011	Amman, Jordan	Lebanon	10–1	10–1	Friendly
50	17 September 2011	Amman, Jordan	Lebanon	1–0	2–0	Friendly
51	26 September 2011	Egypt	Egypt	1–?	1–2	Friendly
52	3 October 2011	Zayed Bin Sultan Stadium, Abu Dhabi, United Arab Emirates	Palestine	2–1	8–1	2011 WAFF Championship
53	3 October 2011	Zayed Bin Sultan Stadium, Abu Dhabi, United Arab Emirates	Palestine	3–1	8–1	2011 WAFF Championship
54	3 October 2011	Zayed Bin Sultan Stadium, Abu Dhabi, United Arab Emirates	Palestine	4–1	8–1	2011 WAFF Championship
55	3 October 2011	Zayed Bin Sultan Stadium, Abu Dhabi, United Arab Emirates	Palestine	5–1	8–1	2011 WAFF Championship
56	3 October 2011	Zayed Bin Sultan Stadium, Abu Dhabi, United Arab Emirates	Palestine	8–1	8–1	2011 WAFF Championship
57	5 October 2011	Zayed Bin Sultan Stadium, Abu Dhabi, United Arab Emirates	Bahrain	2–1	2–2	2011 WAFF Championship
58	7 October 2011	Zayed Bin Sultan Stadium, Abu Dhabi, United Arab Emirates	Iraq	2–0	4–0	2011 WAFF Championship
59	1 April 2013	Jordan	Palestine	1–0	4–0	Friendly
60	1 April 2013	Jordan	Palestine	2–0	4–0	Friendly
61	1 April 2013	Jordan	Palestine	4–0	4–0	Friendly
62	3 April 2013	Jordan	Palestine	6–?	6–2	Friendly
63	26 April 2013	Hanoi, Vietnam	Vietnam	1–0	1–1	Friendly
64	16 May 2013	Amman, Jordan	Vietnam	1–5	1–5	Friendly
65	7 June 2013	Amman International Stadium, Amman, Jordan	Kuwait	2–0	21–0	2014 Asian Cup qualification
66	7 June 2013	Amman International Stadium, Amman, Jordan	Kuwait	4–0	21–0	2014 Asian Cup qualification
67	7 June 2013	Amman International Stadium, Amman, Jordan	Kuwait	5–0	21–0	2014 Asian Cup qualification
68	7 June 2013	Amman International Stadium, Amman, Jordan	Kuwait	7–0	21–0	2014 Asian Cup qualification
69	7 June 2013	Amman International Stadium, Amman, Jordan	Kuwait	8–0	21–0	2014 Asian Cup qualification
70	7 June 2013	Amman International Stadium, Amman, Jordan	Kuwait	12–0	21–0	2014 Asian Cup qualification
71	7 June 2013	Amman International Stadium, Amman, Jordan	Kuwait	13–0	21–0	2014 Asian Cup qualification
72	7 June 2013	Amman International Stadium, Amman, Jordan	Kuwait	19–0	21–0	2014 Asian Cup qualification
73	5 September 2013	Laos	Laos	1–?	3–4	Friendly
74	15 April 2014	Petra Stadium, Amman, Jordan	Bahrain	5–0	5–0	2014 WAFF Championship
75	19 April 2014	Petra Stadium, Amman, Jordan	Palestine	6–0	10–0	2014 WAFF Championship
76	19 April 2014	Petra Stadium, Amman, Jordan	Palestine	7–0	10–0	2014 WAFF Championship
77	14 May 2014	Thống Nhất Stadium, Ho Chi Minh City, Vietnam	Vietnam	1–1	1–3	2014 Asian Cup
78	15 September 2014	Namdong Asiad Rugby Field, Incheon, South Korea	Chinese Taipei	2–2	2–2	2014 Asian Games
79	11 March 2015	Petra Stadium, Amman, Jordan	Hong Kong	1–0	1–0	2016 Olympics qualification
80	13 March 2015	Petra Stadium, Amman, Jordan	Palestine	2–0	6–0	2016 Olympics qualification
81	13 March 2015	Petra Stadium, Amman, Jordan	Palestine	4–0	6–0	2016 Olympics qualification
82	13 March 2015	Petra Stadium, Amman, Jordan	Palestine	6–0	6–0	2016 Olympics qualification
83	24 August 2015	Jordan	Morocco	2–?	2–1	Friendly
84	26 August 2015	Jordan	Morocco	1–?	2–2	Friendly
85	20 September 2015	Mandalarthiri Stadium, Mandalay, Myanmar	Vietnam	1–2	1–2	2016 Olympics qualification
86	3 April 2017	Pamir Stadium, Dushanbe, Tajikistan	Bahrain	2–0	6–0	2018 Asian Cup qualification
87	3 April 2017	Pamir Stadium, Dushanbe, Tajikistan	Bahrain	3–0	6–0	2018 Asian Cup qualification
88	3 April 2017	Pamir Stadium, Dushanbe, Tajikistan	Bahrain	4–0	6–0	2018 Asian Cup qualification
89	5 April 2017	Pamir Stadium, Dushanbe, Tajikistan	United Arab Emirates	1–0	6–0	2018 Asian Cup qualification
90	5 April 2017	Pamir Stadium, Dushanbe, Tajikistan	United Arab Emirates	2–0	6–0	2018 Asian Cup qualification
91	5 April 2017	Pamir Stadium, Dushanbe, Tajikistan	United Arab Emirates	4–0	6–0	2018 Asian Cup qualification
92	5 April 2017	Pamir Stadium, Dushanbe, Tajikistan	United Arab Emirates	6–0	6–0	2018 Asian Cup qualification
93	7 April 2017	Pamir Stadium, Dushanbe, Tajikistan	Iraq	4–0	10–0	2018 Asian Cup qualification
94	7 April 2017	Pamir Stadium, Dushanbe, Tajikistan	Iraq	6–0	10–0	2018 Asian Cup qualification
95	7 April 2017	Pamir Stadium, Dushanbe, Tajikistan	Iraq	8–0	10–0	2018 Asian Cup qualification
96	7 April 2017	Pamir Stadium, Dushanbe, Tajikistan	Iraq	10–0	10–0	2018 Asian Cup qualification
97	12 April 2017	Pamir Stadium, Dushanbe, Tajikistan	Philippines	2–0	5–1	2018 Asian Cup qualification
98	12 April 2017	Pamir Stadium, Dushanbe, Tajikistan	Philippines	3–0	5–1	2018 Asian Cup qualification
99	19 June 2017	Jordan	Algeria	2–?	3–2	Friendly
100	31 July 2017	Zenica, Bosnia and Herzegovina	Bosnia and Herzegovina	1–1	4–2	Friendly
101	3 August 2017	Zenica, Bosnia and Herzegovina	Bosnia and Herzegovina	1–?	2–2	Friendly
102	27 November 2017	Istanbul, Turkey	Turkey	1–1	2–1	Friendly
103	12 December 2017	Nonthaburi, Thailand	Thailand	1–1	2–1	Friendly
104	12 December 2017	Nonthaburi, Thailand	Thailand	2–1	2–1	Friendly
105	2 February 2018	Amman, Jordan	Afghanistan	3–0	5–0	Friendly
106	5 February 2018	Amman, Jordan	Afghanistan	3–0	6–0	Friendly
107	5 February 2018	Amman, Jordan	Afghanistan	4–0	6–0	Friendly
108	4 March 2018	Side Atatürk Stadı, Side, Turkey	Latvia	2–0	3–2	2018 Turkish Cup
109	6 March 2018	Alanya Oba Stadium, Alanya, Turkey	Romania	1–2	1–2	2018 Turkish Cup
110	6 April 2018	Amman International Stadium, Amman, Jordan	Philippines	1–0	1–2	2018 Asian Cup
111	10 April 2021	Charentsavan City Stadium, Charentsavan, Armenia	Armenia	1–1	1–1	2021 Armenia Friendly Tournament
112	12 April 2021	Charentsavan City Stadium, Charentsavan, Armenia	Lebanon	1–0	6–0	2021 Armenia Friendly Tournament
113	12 April 2021	Charentsavan City Stadium, Charentsavan, Armenia	Lebanon	5–0	6–0	2021 Armenia Friendly Tournament
114	10 June 2021	King Abdullah II Stadium, Amman, Jordan	Tunisia	1–1	1–2	Friendly
115	25 August 2021	Air Defense Stadium, Cairo, Egypt	Algeria	1–1	1–3	2021 Arab Cup
116	31 August 2021	Air Defense Stadium, Cairo, Egypt	Palestine	1–0	4–1	2021 Arab Cup
117	31 August 2021	Air Defense Stadium, Cairo, Egypt	Palestine	3–1	4–1	2021 Arab Cup
118	3 September 2021	Osman Ahmed Osman Stadium, Cairo, Egypt	Egypt	1–0	5–2	2021 Arab Cup
119	3 September 2021	Osman Ahmed Osman Stadium, Cairo, Egypt	Egypt	4–1	5–2	2021 Arab Cup
120	6 September 2021	Osman Ahmed Osman Stadium, Cairo, Egypt	Tunisia	1–0	1–0	2021 Arab Cup
121	19 February 2021	Milliy Stadium, Tashkent, Uzbekistan	Bangladesh	3–0	5–0	2022 Asian Cup qualification
122	19 February 2021	Milliy Stadium, Tashkent, Uzbekistan	Bangladesh	4–0	5–0	2022 Asian Cup qualification
123	19 February 2021	Milliy Stadium, Tashkent, Uzbekistan	Bangladesh	5–0	5–0	2022 Asian Cup qualification
124	28 June 2022	CNAF Stadium, Buftea, Romania	Romania	1–2	1–3	Friendly
125	29 August 2022	Petra Stadium, Amman, Jordan	Syria	1–0	4–0	2022 WAFF Championship
126	29 August 2022	Petra Stadium, Amman, Jordan	Syria	2–0	4–0	2022 WAFF Championship
127	29 August 2022	Petra Stadium, Amman, Jordan	Syria	4–0	4–0	2022 WAFF Championship
128	4 September 2022	Petra Stadium, Amman, Jordan	Palestine	1–0	4–0	2022 WAFF Championship
129	4 September 2022	Petra Stadium, Amman, Jordan	Palestine	2–0	4–0	2022 WAFF Championship
130	4 September 2022	Petra Stadium, Amman, Jordan	Palestine	4–0	4–0	2022 WAFF Championship
131	19 March 2023	Petra Stadium, Amman, Jordan	India	1–0	2–1	Friendly
132	5 April 2023	Pakhtakor Stadium, Tashkent, Uzbekistan	Timor-Leste	2–0	3–1	2024 Olympics qualification
133	8 April 2023	Pakhtakor Stadium, Tashkent, Uzbekistan	Bhutan	1–2	1–2	2024 Olympics qualification
134	19 February 2024	King Abdullah Sports City Reserve Stadium, Jeddah, Saudi Arabia	Saudi Arabia	2–1	3–1	2024 WAFF Championship
135	21 February 2024	King Abdullah Sports City Reserve Stadium, Jeddah, Saudi Arabia	Guam	1–0	3–0	2024 WAFF Championship
136	21 February 2024	King Abdullah Sports City Reserve Stadium, Jeddah, Saudi Arabia	Guam	2–0	3–0	2024 WAFF Championship
137	27 February 2025	Prince Abdullah Al-Faisal Sports City, Jeddah, Saudi Arabia	Palestine	1–0	5–0	2024 WAFF Championship
138	27 February 2025	Prince Abdullah Al-Faisal Sports City, Jeddah, Saudi Arabia	Palestine	4–0	5–0	2024 WAFF Championship
139	7 July 2025	King Abdullah II Stadium, Amman, Jordan	Lebanon	1–0	4–0	2026 Asian Cup qualification
140	7 July 2025	King Abdullah II Stadium, Amman, Jordan	Lebanon	2–0	4–0	2026 Asian Cup qualification
141	13 July 2025	King Abdullah II Stadium, Amman, Jordan	Singapore	1–0	5–0	2026 Asian Cup qualification
142	13 July 2025	King Abdullah II Stadium, Amman, Jordan	Singapore	3–0	5–0	2026 Asian Cup qualification
143	16 July 2025	King Abdullah II Stadium, Amman, Jordan	Bhutan	1–0	3–0	2026 Asian Cup qualification
144	3 June 2026	King Abdullah II Stadium, Amman, Jordan	Malaysia	3–3	4–3	Friendly
145	9 June 2026	King Abdullah II Stadium, Amman, Jordan	Palestine	1–0	1–0	Friendly
146	7 October 2026	Al-Aqaba Stadium, Aqaba, Jordan	Armenia	1–2	1–2	Friendly

Hat-tricks
No.	Opponent	Goals	Score	Venue	Competition	Date
1	Bahrain	3 (1–?, 2–?, 3–?)	6–1	Amman International Stadium, Amman, Jordan	Friendly	18 September 2005
2	Palestine	4 (1–0, 2–0, 5–0, 9–0)	9–0	Amman International Stadium, Amman, Jordan	2005 WAFF Championship	23 September 2005
3	Bahrain	3 (2–0, 5–0, 8–0)	9–0	Amman International Stadium, Amman, Jordan	2005 WAFF Championship	25 September 2005
4	Bahrain	3 (1–?, 3–?, 4–?)	4–1	Manama, Bahrain	Friendly	14 October 2010
5	Iraq	8 (3–0, 4–0, 8–0, 11–0, 14–0, 15–0, 16–0, 17–0)	20–0	Al Ahli Stadium, Manama, Bahrain	2010 Arabia Cup	19 October 2010
6	Iraq	8 (3–0, 4–0, 8–0, 11–0, 14–0, 15–0, 16–0, 17–0)	20–0	Al Ahli Stadium, Manama, Bahrain	2010 Arabia Cup	19 October 2010
7	Lebanon	3 (1–?, 3–?, 4–?)	4–1	Al Ahli Stadium, Manama, Bahrain	Friendly	15 September 2011
8	Palestine	5 (2–1, 3–1, 4–1, 5–1, 8–1)	8–1	Zayed Bin Sultan Stadium, Abu Dhabi, United Arab Emirates	2011 WAFF Championship	3 October 2011
9	Palestine	3 (1–0, 2–0, 4–0)	4–0	Jordan	Friendly	1 April 2013
10	Kuwait	8 (2–0, 4–0, 5–0, 7–0, 8–0, 12–0, 13–0, 19–0)	21–0	Amman International Stadium, Amman, Jordan	2014 Asian Cup qualification	7 June 2013
11	Kuwait	8 (2–0, 4–0, 5–0, 7–0, 8–0, 12–0, 13–0, 19–0)	21–0	Amman International Stadium, Amman, Jordan	2014 Asian Cup qualification	7 June 2013
12	Palestine	3 (2–0, 4–0, 6–0)	4–0	Petra Stadium, Amman, Jordan	2016 Olympic qualification	13 March 2015
13	Bahrain	3 (2–0, 3–0, 4–0)	6–0	Pamir Stadium, Dushanbe, Tajikistan	2018 Asian Cup qualification	3 April 2017
14	United Arab Emirates	4 (1–0, 2–0, 4–0, 6–0)	6–0	Pamir Stadium, Dushanbe, Tajikistan	2018 Asian Cup qualification	5 April 2017
15	Iraq	4 (4–0, 6–0, 9–0, 10–0)	10–0	Pamir Stadium, Dushanbe, Tajikistan	2018 Asian Cup qualification	7 April 2017
16	Bangladesh	3 (3–0, 4–0, 5–0)	5–0	Milliy Stadium, Tashkent, Uzbekistan	2022 Asian Cup qualification	19 February 2021
17	Syria	3 (3–0, 4–0, 5–0)	5–0	Petra Stadium, Amman, Jordan	2022 WAFF Championship	29 August 2022
18	Palestine	3 (1–0, 2–0, 4–0)	4–0	Petra Stadium, Amman, Jordan	2022 WAFF Championship	4 September 2022

== Honours ==
Sadaka

- Lebanese Women's Football League: 2007–08, 2008–09, 2009–10
- Lebanese Women's FA Cup: 2007–08, 2008–09, 2009–10

Amman

- Jordan Women's Football League: 2010–11, 2014–15
- AFC Women's Club Championship: 2021

Zouk Mosbeh

- Lebanese Women's Football League: 2017–18
- Lebanese Women's FA Cup: 2017–18

Al Nassr

- Saudi Women's Premier League: 2022–23, 2023–24

Neom

- Saudi Women's First Division League: 2024–25

Jordan

- WAFF Women's Championship: 2005, 2007, 2014, 2019, 2022, 2024
- Arab Women's Cup: 2010

== See also ==
- List of top international women's football goalscorers by country
