= Sarshin Kamangar =

Iranian footballer (born 1995)

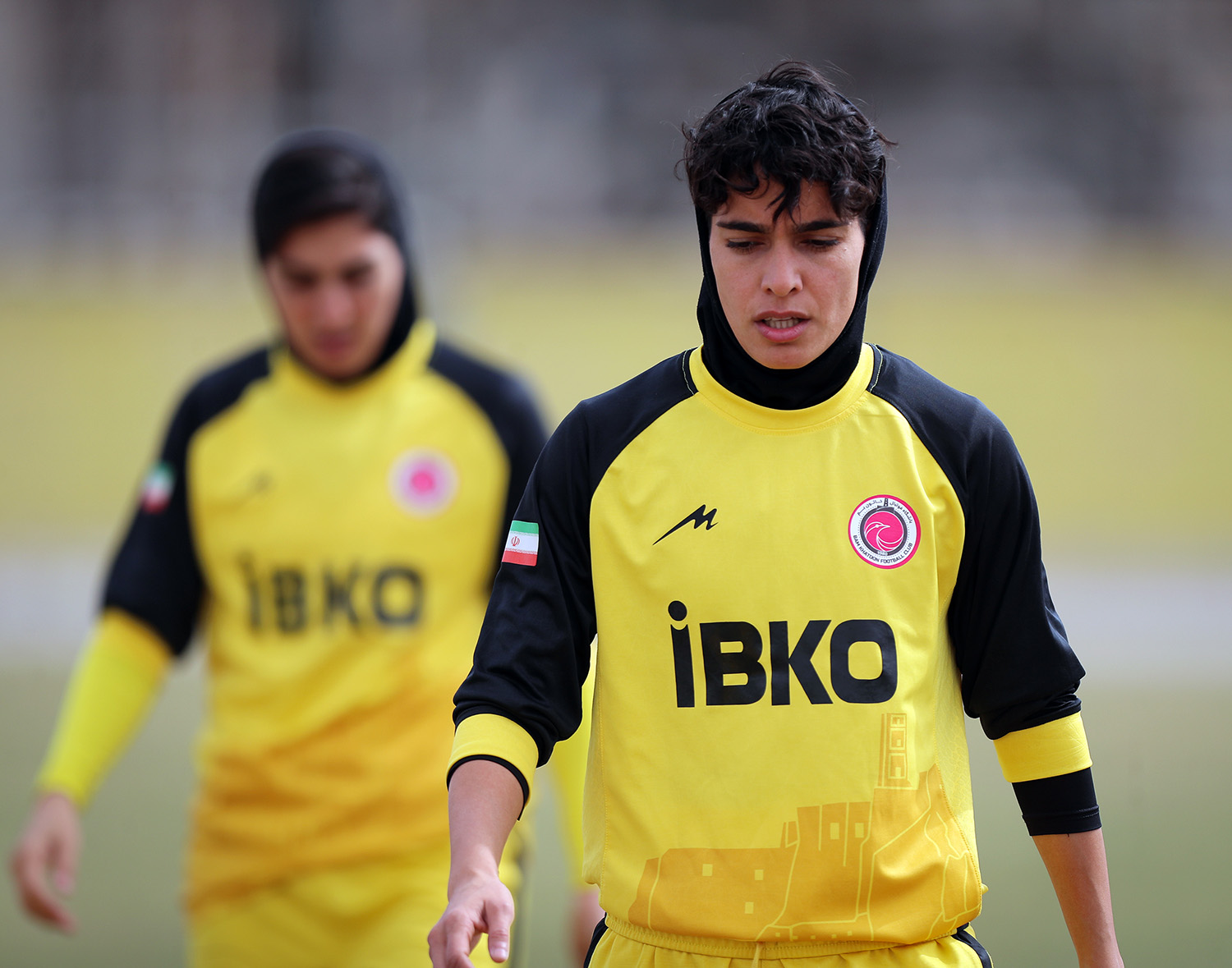
- Sarshin Kamangar playing for Bam Khatoon F.C.

Personal information
- Full name: Sarshin Kamangar
- Date of birth: 13 February 1995 (age 31)
- Place of birth: Kamyaran, Iran
- Position: Defender

Team information
- Current team: Bam Khatoon FC
- Number: 88

Senior career*
Years	Team	Apps	(Gls)
- Bam Khatoon FC

International career
2021	Iran		
- * Club domestic league appearances and goals

Sarshin Kamangar (Persian: سرشین کمانگر; born 13 February 1995 in Kamyaran) is an Iranian footballer who plays as a defender for Kowsar Women Football League club Bam Khatoon FC and the Iran national team.

She used to play for the Iran Women's National football team since 2008.
