= Kay Fung =

Hongkonger footballer

Personal information
- Full name: Kay Fung Nga Kei
- Date of birth: 11 September 1988 (age 38)
- Place of birth: Kwai Chung, Hong Kong
- Position: Forward

Team information
- Current team: Citizen

Senior career*
Years	Team	Apps	(Gls)
- Citizen

International career^{‡}
2007–	Hong Kong	12+	(4)
- * Club domestic league appearances and goals ‡ National team caps and goals as of 15 September 2019

Kay Fung Nga Kei (born 11 September 1988) is a Hongkonger footballer who plays as a forward for Hong Kong Women League club Citizen AA and the Hong Kong women's national team.

== International career ==
Fung represented Hong Kong at three AFC Women's Asian Cup qualification editions (2008, 2010 and 2014), two AFC Women's Olympic Qualifying Tournament editions (2012 and 2020) and the 2018 Asian Games.

== International goals ==
No.	Date	Venue	Opponent	Score	Result	Competition
1.	6 July 2009	Thành Long Sports Centre, Ho Chi Minh City, Vietnam	Kyrgyzstan	1–0	2–0	2010 AFC Women's Asian Cup qualification
2.	24 May 2013	Bahrain National Stadium, Riffa, Bahrain	Bahrain	2–1	3–1	2014 AFC Women's Asian Cup qualification
3.	24 May 2013	Bahrain National Stadium, Riffa, Bahrain	Bahrain	3–1	3–1	2014 AFC Women's Asian Cup qualification
4.	18 November 2014	Taipei Municipal Stadium, Taipei, Taiwan	Guam	1–0	3–0	2015 EAFF Women's East Asian Cup
5.	18 November 2014	Taipei Municipal Stadium, Taipei, Taiwan	Guam	2–0	3–0	2015 EAFF Women's East Asian Cup

== See also ==
- List of Hong Kong women's international footballers
