= Svetlana Tynkova =

Kyrgyzstani footballer

Personal information
- Full name: Svetlana Yevgenyevna Tynkova
- Date of birth: 6 August 1993 (age 33)
- Place of birth: Kyrgyzstan
- Position: Defender

International career^{‡}
Years	Team	Apps	(Gls)
2009–	Kyrgyzstan	6	(2)
- ‡ National team caps and goals as of 11:29, 22 March 2015 (UTC)

Svetlana Yevgenyevna Tynkova (Russian: Светлана Евгеньевна Тынкова; born 6 August 1993) is a Kyrgyzstani international footballer who plays as a defender.

== International goals ==
No.	Date	Venue	Opponent	Score	Result	Competition
1.	22 May 2013	Bahrain National Stadium, Riffa, Bahrain	Hong Kong	1–1	1–2	2014 AFC Women's Asian Cup qualification
2.	26 May 2013	Bahrain National Stadium, Riffa, Bahrain	Bahrain	1–3	1–4	2014 AFC Women's Asian Cup qualification
