= 2014 AFC Women's Asian Cup qualification =

Tournament details
- Dates: 21 May – 9 June 2013
- Teams: 16 (from 1 confederation)

Tournament statistics
- Matches played: 24
- Goals scored: 151 (6.29 per match)
- Top scorer(s): (Uzbekistan) Zebo Juraeva (9 goals)

The 2014 AFC Women's Asian Cup qualification saw 16 nations attempt to qualify for the 2014 AFC Women's Asian Cup football competition. The four winners from all groups joined the four automatic qualifiers in the final tournament.

This tournament also served as the first stage of qualification for the 2015 FIFA Women's World Cup for the Asian zone.

== Participants ==
Participants from the qualification round were as follows (numbers denote the seeding order):

- 1. Thailand
- 2. Myanmar
- 3. Vietnam
- 4. Uzbekistan
- 5. Jordan
- 6. Hong Kong
- 7. Chinese Taipei
- 8. Iran
- 9. Kyrgyzstan
- 10. Palestine
- 11. Bahrain
- 12. Bangladesh
- 13. India
- 14. Kuwait
- 15. Lebanon
- 16. Philippines

== Groups ==
Total sixteen teams were divided into four groups of four, and each group played a single round-robin tournament. The winners of each group qualified for the final tournament. The draw was held on 19 October 2012 in Malacca, Malaysia. The first matches were played on 21 May 2013.

In the round-robin tournaments, teams tied in the points were ranked by the following criteria:

1. Greater number of points between the teams concerned,
2. Goal differences between the teams concerned,
3. Number of goals between the teams concerned,
4. Goal differences between in all round-robin matches,
5. Number of goals between in all round-robin matches,
6. Penalty shoot-out (in case just two teams playing the final match tied in the all conditions above),
7. Fewer yellow and red card points in all group matches (1 point for each yellow card, 3 points for each red card as a consequence of two yellow cards, 3 points for each direct red card, 4 points for each yellow card followed by a direct red card), and
8. Drawing of lots.

=== Group A ===
Pos	Team	Pld	W	D	L	GF	GA	GD	Pts	Qualification
1	Jordan (H)	3	3	0	0	30	0	+30	9	2014 AFC Women's Asian Cup
2	Uzbekistan	3	2	0	1	22	4	+18	6	
3	Lebanon	3	1	0	2	12	10	+2	3	
4	Kuwait	3	0	0	3	1	51	−50	0	

Source: AFC
(H) Hosts

All matches were played in Jordan (all times UTC+2).

5 June 2013
16:00

Uzbekistan	18–0	Kuwait
Juraeva 4', 14', 21', 35', 45+1', 51', 58', 73'; Turdiboeva 6', 42'; Riskieva 23'; Sarikova 31'; Turapova 34', 36', 65'; Moiseeva 70'; Bakhromova 72'; Zarbieva 78'	Report

Amman International Stadium, Amman
Attendance: 200
Referee: Maria Piedade Rebello (India)
5 June 2013
19:00

Jordan	5–0	Lebanon
Al-Masri 21'; Al-Naber 33', 40'; Khraisat 53', 59'	Report

Amman International Stadium, Amman
Attendance: 1,000
Referee: Park Ji-Yeong (South Korea)

7 June 2013
16:00

Lebanon	0–4	Uzbekistan
	Report	Turdiboeva 2'; Juraeva 41'; Turapova 45+2'; Ermatova 46'

Amman International Stadium, Amman
Attendance: 100
Referee: Li Juan (China)
7 June 2013
19:00

Kuwait	0–21	Jordan
	Report	Jebreen 3', 70'; Jbarah 16', 18', 19', 28', 32', 45+1', 53', 81'; Al-Naber 17', 35', 38', 72'; Al-Nahar 20', 43', 56', 71', 84', 90+1'; Al-Masri 78'

Amman International Stadium, Amman
Attendance: 500
Referee: Saltanat Narouzi (Iran)

9 June 2013
16:00

Lebanon	12–1	Kuwait
Dbouk 12'; Assaf 19', 51'; El Jaafil 27'; Schtakleff 29', 77'; Bahlawan 38', 90+3'; Al Sayegh 45+1', 46'; Hamadeh 56'; Bakri 80'	Report	Haji 86'

Amman International Stadium, Amman
Attendance: 100
Referee: Li Juan (China)
9 June 2013
19:00

Uzbekistan	0–4	Jordan
	Report	Khraisat 57', 80'; Jebreen 59'; Al-Naber 75'

Amman International Stadium, Amman
Attendance: 2,500
Referee: Maria Piedade Rebello (India)

=== Group B ===
Pos	Team	Pld	W	D	L	GF	GA	GD	Pts	Qualification
1	Thailand	3	3	0	0	15	1	+14	9	2014 AFC Women's Asian Cup
2	Philippines	3	2	0	1	10	1	+9	6	
3	Iran	3	1	0	2	3	11	−8	3	
4	Bangladesh (H)	3	0	0	3	0	15	−15	0	

Source: AFC
(H) Hosts

All matches were played in Bangladesh (all times UTC+6).

21 May 2013
16:00

Iran	0–6	Philippines
	Report	Cooke 1'; Jurado 3'; Shugg 4', 90+2'; Kamangar 33' (o.g.); Houplin 40'

Bangabandhu National Stadium, Dhaka
Attendance: 1,200
Referee: Kate Jacewicz (Australia)
21 May 2013
19:00

Thailand	9–0	Bangladesh
Rattikan 16'; Naphat 18'; Nisa 29', 45', 87', 90+3'; Trishna 52' (o.g.); Sunisa 64'; Boontan 79'	Report

Bangabandhu National Stadium, Dhaka
Attendance: 3,000
Referee: Cong Thi Dung (Vietnam)

23 May 2013
16:00

Philippines	0–1	Thailand
	Report	Nisa 37'

Bangabandhu National Stadium, Dhaka
Attendance: 700
Referee: Sachiko Yamagishi (Japan)
23 May 2013
19:00

Bangladesh	0–2	Iran
	Report	Rahimi 26', 51'

Bangabandhu National Stadium, Dhaka
Attendance: 1,500
Referee: Thein Thein Aye (Myanmar)

25 May 2013
16:00

Thailand	5–1	Iran
Nisa 46', 65', 85'; Anootsara 70'; Naphat 74'	Report	Ghomi 79'

Bangabandhu National Stadium, Dhaka
Attendance: 500
Referee: Cong Thi Dung (Vietnam)
25 May 2013
19:00

Philippines	4–0	Bangladesh
Park 19', 90+5'; De los Reyes 29'; Barnekow 85'	Report

Bangabandhu National Stadium, Dhaka
Attendance: 700
Referee: Kate Jacewicz (Australia)

=== Group C ===
Pos	Team	Pld	W	D	L	GF	GA	GD	Pts	Qualification
1	Vietnam	3	3	0	0	24	0	+24	9	2014 AFC Women's Asian Cup
2	Hong Kong	3	2	0	1	5	6	−1	6	
3	Bahrain (H)	3	1	0	2	5	12	−7	3	
4	Kyrgyzstan	3	0	0	3	2	18	−16	0	

Source: AFC
(H) Hosts

All matches were played in Bahrain (all times UTC+3).

22 May 2013
18:00

Vietnam	8–0	Bahrain
Nguyễn Thị Minh Nguyệt 3'; Trần Thị Kim Hồng 20'; Nguyễn Thị Xuyến 22'; Nguyễn Thị Muôn 38', 58', 70'; Nguyễn Thị Liễu 45'; Nguyễn Thị Kim Tiến 65'	Report

Bahrain National Stadium, Riffa
Attendance: 200
Referee: Wang Jia (China)
22 May 2013
20:00

Hong Kong	2–1	Kyrgyzstan
Cheung Wai Ki 41', 86'	Report	Tynkova 59'

Bahrain National Stadium, Riffa
Attendance: 60
Referee: Shiva Yari (Iran)

24 May 2013
18:00

Bahrain	1–3	Hong Kong
Al Hashmi 25'	Report	Cheung Wai Ki 52'; Fung 65', 69'

Bahrain National Stadium, Riffa
Attendance: 80
Referee: Rita Gani (Malaysia)
24 May 2013
20:30

Kyrgyzstan	0–12	Vietnam
	Report	Nguyễn Thị Minh Nguyệt 3', 12', 22'; Nguyễn Thị Ngọc Anh 5'; Nguyễn Thị Xuyến 14'; Nguyễn Thị Hòa 23', 71'; Nguyễn Thị Muôn 35'; Nguyễn Thị Kim Tiến 50'; Trần Thị Kim Hồng 65'; Huỳnh Như 81', 88'

Bahrain National Stadium, Riffa
Attendance: 50
Referee: Li Juan (China)

26 May 2013
18:00

Vietnam	4–0	Hong Kong
Nguyễn Thị Minh Nguyệt 5'; Nguyễn Thị Hòa 7'; Cheung Wai Ki 30' (o.g.); Trần Thị Kim Hồng 57'	Report

Bahrain National Stadium, Riffa
Attendance: 80
Referee: Rita Gani (Malaysia)
26 May 2013
20:30

Kyrgyzstan	1–4	Bahrain
Tynkova 31'	Report	Abdelrahman 3', 33'; Al Hashmi 20', 49'

Bahrain National Stadium, Riffa
Attendance: 150
Referee: Shiva Yari (Iran)

=== Group D ===
Pos	Team	Pld	W	D	L	GF	GA	GD	Pts	Qualification
1	Myanmar	3	2	1	0	11	0	+11	7	2014 AFC Women's Asian Cup
2	Chinese Taipei	3	2	1	0	8	1	+7	7	
3	India	3	0	1	2	2	5	−3	1	
4	Palestine (H)	3	0	1	2	1	16	−15	1	

Source: AFC
(H) Hosts

All matches were played in Palestine (all times UTC+3).

21 May 2013
17:00

Chinese Taipei	6–0	Palestine
Lin Ya-han 5', 54', 80'; Yu Hsiu-chin 40'; Lai Li-chin 42'; Lin Kai-ling 45+1'	Report

Faisal Al-Husseini International Stadium, Al-Ram
Attendance: 300
Referee: Pannipar Kamnueng (Thailand)
21 May 2013
20:00

Myanmar	2–0	India
Naw Ar Lo Wer Phaw 6'; Khin Moe Wai 26'	Report

Faisal Al-Husseini International Stadium, Al-Ram
Attendance: 150
Referee: Mai Hoang Trang (Vietnam)

23 May 2013
17:00

Palestine	0–9	Myanmar
	Report	Yee Yee Oo 24', 74', 77', 80', 85', 88'; Khin Moe Wai 17', 26'; Margret Marri 67'

Faisal Al-Husseini International Stadium, Al-Ram
Attendance: 150
Referee: Maria Piedade Rebello (India)
23 May 2013
20:00

India	1–2	Chinese Taipei
Sasmita 54'	Report	Yu Hsiu-chin 42'; Lai Li-chin 82'

Faisal Al-Husseini International Stadium, Al-Ram
Attendance: 100
Referee: Edita Mirabidova (Uzbekistan)

25 May 2013
17:00

Palestine	1–1	India
Sohgian 46' (pen.)	Report	Sasmita 35'

Faisal Al-Husseini International Stadium, Al-Ram
Attendance: 150
Referee: Mai Hoang Trang (Vietnam)
25 May 2013
20:00

Myanmar	0–0	Chinese Taipei
	Report

Faisal Al-Husseini International Stadium, Al-Ram
Attendance: 100
Referee: Pannipar Kamnueng (Thailand)

== Qualified teams ==
Direct qualifiers

- Australia
- South Korea
- Japan
- China

Qualifying group winners

- Jordan
- Thailand
- Vietnam
- Myanmar

== Goalscorers ==
9 goals

- (Uzbekistan) Zebo Juraeva

8 goals

- (Jordan) Maysa Jbarah
- (Thailand) Nisa Romyen

7 goals

- (Jordan) Stephanie Al-Naber

6 goals

- (Jordan) Abeer Al-Nahar
- (Myanmar) Yee Yee Oo

5 goals

- (Vietnam) Nguyễn Thị Minh Nguyệt

4 goals

- (Jordan) Shahnaz Jebreen
- (Jordan) Sama’a Khraisat
- (Uzbekistan) Makhfuza Turapova
- (Vietnam) Nguyễn Thị Muôn

3 goals

- (Bahrain) Reem Al Hashmi
- (Chinese Taipei) Lin Ya-han
- (Hong Kong) Cheung Wai Ki
- (Myanmar) Khin Moe Wai
- (Uzbekistan) Feruza Turdiboeva
- (Vietnam) Nguyễn Thị Hòa
- (Vietnam) Trần Thị Kim Hồng

2 goals

- (Bahrain) Deena Abdelrahman
- (Chinese Taipei) Lai Li-chin
- (Chinese Taipei) Yu Hsiu-chin
- (Hong Kong) Fung Kam Mui
- (India) Malik Sasmita
- (Iran) Maryam Rahimi
- (Jordan) Luna Al-Masri
- (Kyrgyzstan) Svetlana Tynkova
- (Lebanon) Nadia Assaf
- (Lebanon) Nadine Schtakleff
- (Lebanon) Lara Bahlawan
- (Lebanon) Saria Al Sayegh
- (Philippines) Marisa Park
- (Philippines) Jesse Shugg
- (Thailand) Naphat Seesraum
- (Vietnam) Huỳnh Như
- (Vietnam) Nguyễn Thị Kim Tiến
- (Vietnam) Nguyễn Thị Xuyến

1 goal

- (Chinese Taipei) Lin Kai-ling
- (Iran) Sara Ghomi
- (Kuwait) Amani Hajji
- (Lebanon) Sara Bakri
- (Lebanon) Sahar Dbouk
- (Lebanon) Hiba El Jaafil
- (Lebanon) Taghrid Hamadeh
- (Myanmar) Margret Marri
- (Myanmar) Naw Ar Lo Wer Phaw
- (Palestine) Caroline Sohgian
- (Philippines) Cat Barnekow
- (Philippines) Heather Cooke
- (Philippines) Christina delos Reyes
- (Philippines) Joana Houplin
- (Philippines) Megan Jurado
- (Thailand) Anootsara Maijarern
- (Thailand) Boontan Anongnat
- (Thailand) Rattikan Thongsombut
- (Thailand) Sunisa Srangthaisong
- (Uzbekistan) Fazilat Bakhromova
- (Uzbekistan) Aziza Ermatova
- (Uzbekistan) Maria Moiseeva
- (Uzbekistan) Kamola Riskieva
- (Uzbekistan) Makhliyo Sarikova
- (Uzbekistan) Tanzilya Zarbieva
- (Vietnam) Nguyễn Thị Liễu
- (Vietnam) Nguyễn Thị Ngọc Anh

1 own goal

- (Bangladesh) Trishna Chakma (playing against Thailand)
- (Hong Kong) Cheung Wai Ki (playing against Vietnam)
- (Iran) Sarshin Kamangar (playing against the Philippines)
