= 2007 WAFF Women's Championship =

2nd edition of the WAFF Women's Championship

Tournament details
- Host country: Jordan
- Dates: 3–7 September
- Teams: 4 (from 1 sub-confederation)
- Venue: 1 (in 1 host city)

Final positions
- Champions: Jordan (2nd title)
- Runners-up: Iran
- Third place: Lebanon
- Fourth place: Syria

Tournament statistics
- Matches played: 6
- Goals scored: 37 (6.17 per match)

The 2007 WAFF Women's Championship was held in Amman, Jordan. It was the second West Asian Football Federation Women's Championship held. Four teams competed and Jordan, the hosts and defending champions, won the tournament.

== Results ==
Team	Pts	Pld	W	D	L	GF	GA	GD
Jordan	9	3	3	0	0	12	2	+10
Iran	6	3	2	0	1	17	2	+15
Lebanon	3	3	1	0	2	7	6	+1
Syria	0	3	0	0	3	1	27	−26

2007-09-03

Iran	13 – 0	Syria

2007-09-03

Jordan	3 – 0	Lebanon
Al-Naber 21'; Al-Azab 25'; Jbarah 50'	Report

2007-09-05

Lebanon	0 – 3	Iran
	Report

2007-09-05

Syria	1 – 7	Jordan
?'		Jbarah 9', 31'; Jebreen 47'; Al-Naber 65' (pen.), 75' (pen.); Khraisat 86'; Frij 89'

2007-09-07

Syria	0 – 7	Lebanon
	Report	Cheaitou; Assaf; Hamadeh; Kraim

2007-09-07

Iran	1 – 2	Jordan
?'		Jbarah 50'; Al-Naber 65'

2007 West Asian Football Federation Women's champions

Jordan
Second title
