= Lebanon women's national football team =

Lebanon
- Nickname(s): صبايا الأرز, Sabāyā al-Arz (The Lady Cedars)
- Association: Lebanese Football Association (LFA)
- Confederation: AFC (Asia)
- Sub-confederation: WAFF (West Asia)
- Head coach: Wael Gharzeddine
- Captain: Lili Iskandar
- Most caps: Syntia Salha (41)
- Top scorer: Christy Maalouf (18)
- Home stadium: Various
- FIFA code: LBN
First colours	Second colours

FIFA ranking
- Current: 130 (20 October 2026)
- Highest: 102 (December 2013)
- Lowest: 145 (April – August 2021)

First international
- Lebanon 0–12 Algeria (Alexandria, Egypt; 19 April 2006)

Biggest win
- Lebanon 12–1 Kuwait (Amman, Jordan; 9 June 2013)

Biggest defeat
- Greece 14–0 Lebanon (Pegeia, Cyprus; 12 March 2015)

Arab Women's Cup
- Appearances: 2 (first in 2006)
- Best result: Group stage (2006, 2021)

WAFF Women's Championship
- Appearances: 5 (first in 2007)
- Best result: Runners-up (2022)
Medal record
Women's football
WAFF Women's Championship
Silver medal – second place	2022 Jordan
Bronze medal – third place	2007 Jordan
Bronze medal – third place	2019 Bahrain
- Website: the-lfa.com.lb (in Arabic)

The Lebanon women's national football team (Arabic: منتخب لبنان لكرة القدم للسيدات) represents Lebanon in international women's association football and is governed by the Lebanese Football Association (LFA). The team was formed in 2005 and is affiliated with FIFA and the Asian Football Confederation (AFC).

Lebanon made their competitive debut at the 2006 Arab Women's Championship and first participated in the WAFF Women's Championship in 2007. They first entered qualification for the AFC Women's Asian Cup in 2014, recording a 12–1 victory over Kuwait, their largest win to date. The team have yet to qualify for either the FIFA Women's World Cup or the AFC Women's Asian Cup. Their best result at the WAFF Women's Championship came in 2022, when they finished runners-up, having previously placed third in 2007 and 2019. Lebanon have also participated in the Arab Women's Cup and Olympic qualifying tournaments.

Nicknamed "the Lady Cedars" (Arabic: صبايا الأرز), the team wear a red home kit and a white away kit, reflecting the colours of the Lebanese flag. Lebanon were first included in the FIFA Women's World Ranking in September 2011, reaching their highest position of 102nd in December 2013 and their lowest position of 145th between April and August 2021.

== History ==
Women's football in Lebanon traces its origins to 1964, when Rose La Sorte, the first women's physical education instructor at the American University of Beirut (AUB), introduced the sport into the university's curriculum. The modern development of organized women's football began in 1998, when AUB formed its first official women's team, which played its inaugural match against Notre Dame University–Louaize (NDU) in February 1999. Other institutions, including the American Community School Beirut (ACS) and the International College (IC), soon followed, leading to the first interscholastic girls' tournament in 2002.

=== 2005–2018: Establishment and early developments ===
The Lebanese Women's Football (LWF) committee was established in 2005 and later became affiliated with the Lebanese Football Association (LFA). That same year, the Lebanon women's national team – nicknamed "the Lady Cedars" (Arabic: صبايا الأرز) – were formed, becoming one of the earliest women's national teams in the West Asian Football Federation (WAFF). The team made its competitive debut at the 2006 Arab Women's Championship. In their first-ever official match on 19 April 2006, Lebanon suffered a 12–0 defeat to Algeria. The team then fell 8–0 to Morocco in their second and final group-stage fixture. Failing to score across both matches, Lebanon were eliminated in last place.

Lebanon made its first appearance at the WAFF Women's Championship in 2007. After losses to Jordan and Iran (both 3–0), the team secured a 7–0 win over Syria, with Iman Chaito scoring a hat-trick, finishing third. In the 2011 edition, they again placed third in their group, losing 8–1 to Iran and 5–0 to hosts United Arab Emirates (UAE), but managing a 1–0 win over Syria.

Under coach Farid Nujaim, Lebanon entered qualification for the 2014 AFC Women's Asian Cup – their first official qualifying campaign, eight years from their inception. Drawn with Jordan, Uzbekistan, and Kuwait, the team opened with a 5–0 loss to Jordan and a 4–0 defeat to Uzbekistan, but ended the campaign with a historic 12–1 win against Kuwait – still their largest-margin win to date. Lebanon finished third in their group and did not advance.

Lebanon were scheduled to compete in 2018 Asian Cup qualification, but withdrew in protest over the tournament's location in the West Bank in Palestine, citing opposition to "legitimizing Israel's occupation of the territory." Later that year, the team made its Olympic qualifying debut, suffering heavy defeats to Iran (8–0) and Hong Kong (4–0), and were eliminated in the first round.

=== 2019–present: Rising competitiveness ===
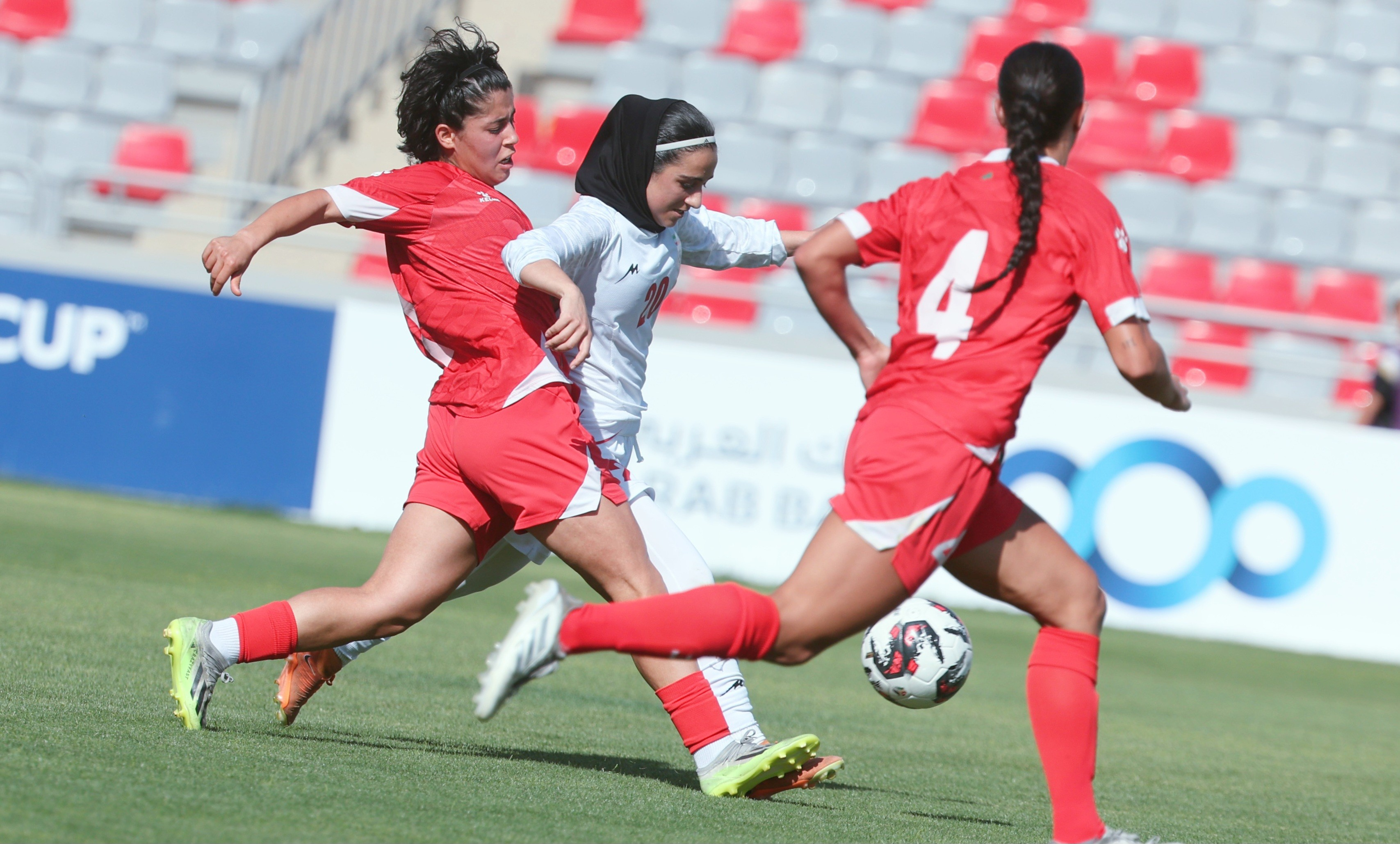
Lebanon against Iran at the 2026 Asian Cup qualifiers

Since 2019, Lebanon has shown steady progress in regional competitions. At the 2019 WAFF Championship, coached by Wael Gharzeddine, the team finished third with wins over the UAE (2–0) and Palestine (3–0), and losses to Jordan (3–1) and Bahrain (3–2).

In August 2021, Lebanon participated in the Arab Women's Cup, achieving their first international draw (0–0 against Tunisia) and a 5–1 win over Sudan. Despite a 4–0 defeat to Egypt, they finished third in its group with four points. Later that year, in the 2022 Asian Cup qualifiers, Lebanon defeated the UAE and Guam but fell short of qualification after a 4–0 loss to Myanmar.

A notable milestone came at the 2022 WAFF Championship under coach Hagop Demirjian, where Lebanon placed second for the first time. After a 3–0 win over Palestine and a 2–1 defeat to hosts Jordan, they closed with a 5–2 victory over Syria. Midfielder Lili Iskandar was named the tournament's best player.

In April 2023, Lebanon competed in the first round of 2024 Olympic qualifiers, losing 5–1 to Chinese Taipei before defeating Indonesia 5–0. Later that year, they won the friendly 2023 SAFF Tournament, beating Laos, Bhutan, and Malaysia (via penalties), and defeating Bhutan 1–0 in extra time during the final. Iskandar scored the decisive goal in extra time and was the tournament’s top scorer with three goals.

At the 2024 WAFF Championship in Saudi Arabia, Lebanon advanced to the semi-finals after finishing second in their group. They began with a 4–3 win, featuring a hat-trick by Iskandar, including a stoppage-time winner, following by a 3–2 victory over the host nation Saudi Arabia, and a 2–0 loss to Jordan. In the semi-finals, Lebanon were eliminated after a 2–1 defeat to Nepal, with the decisive goal scored in stoppage time.

In the 2026 Asian Cup qualifiers, played in July 2025, Lebanon were drawn alongside Iran, Jordan, Singapore, and Bhutan. Following early defeats to Jordan (4–0) and Bhutan (2–1), Lebanon earned a historic 3–1 victory over Iran – who went on to top the group and qualify – thanks to a hat-trick by Christy Maalouf. A 1–0 win against Singapore followed, but Lebanon did not advance.

== Results and fixtures ==
As of 13 October 2026, the Lebanon women's national team has played 74 matches, recording 30 wins, six draws, and 38 defeats. The team has scored 123 goals and conceded 192. Lebanon's largest victory was a 12–1 win against Kuwait in 2013, a winning margin of 11 goals. The team's longest winning streak is five matches, while their longest unbeaten run spans 11 consecutive matches.

The following is a list of match results in the last 12 months, as well as any future matches that have been scheduled.

Legend

Win Draw Loss Fixture

=== 2025 ===
26 November 2025 2025 WAFF Championship GS	Lebanon	0–3	Palestine	Jeddah, Saudi Arabia
19:45 UTC+3		Report	Kord 11'; Osorio 23'; Qassis 56'	Stadium: Hall Stadium – King Abdullah Sports City; Referee: Alesar Baddour (Syria)

28 November 2025 2025 WAFF Championship GS	Jordan	5–0	Lebanon	Jeddah, Saudi Arabia
16:45 UTC+3	Sweilem 17'; Tamimi 29'; Al-Fararjeh 38'; Arabi 43' (o.g.); Abu Tayeh 54'	Report		Stadium: Hall Stadium – King Abdullah Sports City; Referee: Rawdha Al-Mansoori (United Arab Emirates)

=== 2026 ===
10 October 2026 Friendly	Lebanon	1–1	Palestine	Jounieh, Lebanon
14:00 UTC+3	Iskandar 79'	Report	Abu Asfar 4'	Stadium: Fouad Chehab Stadium; Referee: Doumouh Al Bakkar (Lebanon)

13 October 2026 Friendly	Lebanon	2–1	Palestine	Jounieh, Lebanon
14:00 UTC+3	Salha 26'; Maalouf 33'	Report	Al Shaikh 86'	Stadium: Fouad Chehab Stadium; Referee: Karim Chehade (Lebanon)

== Coaching staff ==
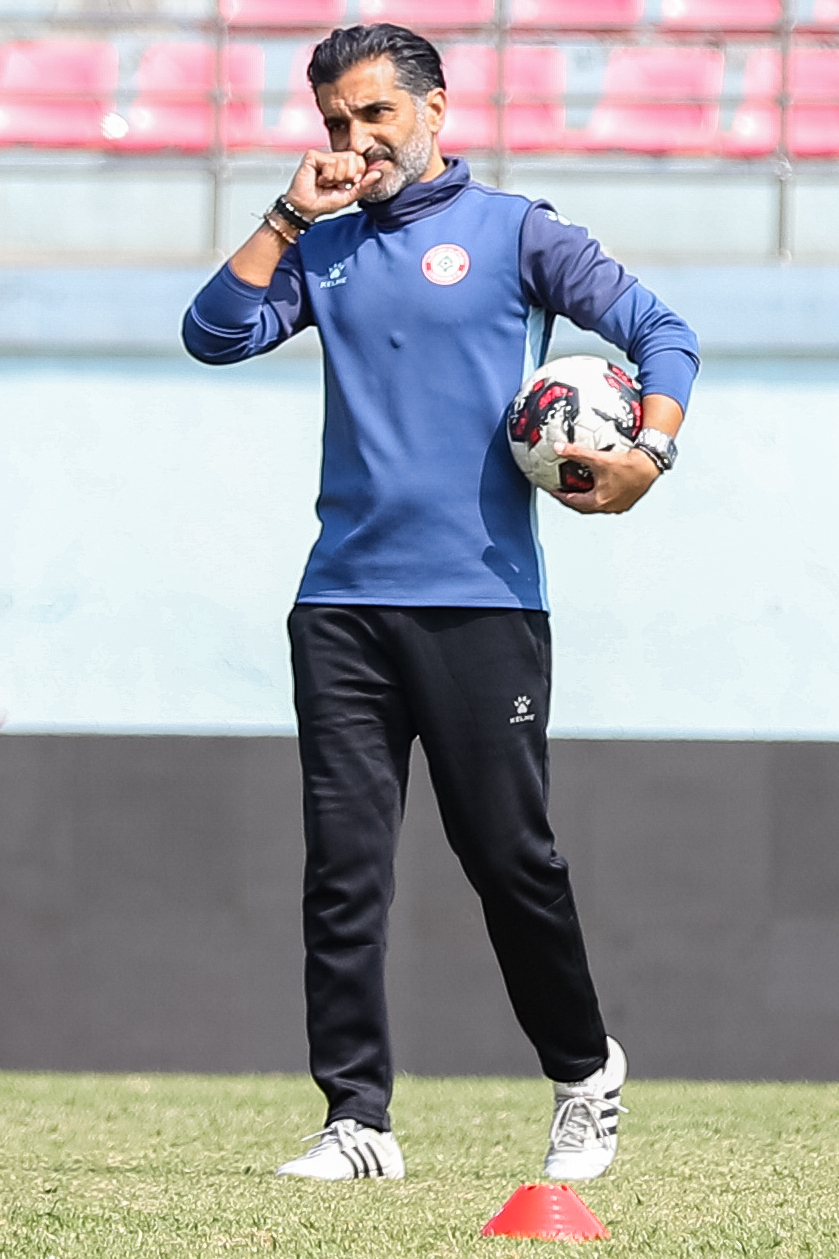
Wael Gharzeddine has been Lebanon's head coach since 2024

As of 5 July 2025

Position	Name
Head coach	(Lebanon) Wael Gharzeddine
Team manager	(Lebanon) Rana Nakhle
Assistant coach	(Lebanon) Joseph Mouawad
Goalkeeper coach	(Lebanon) Ashraf Mahjoub
Fitness coach	(Lebanon) Roger Hamoush
Physiotherapist	(Lebanon) Mariam Moukadem
Equipment officer	(Lebanon) Mohsen Ismail
Media officer	(Lebanon) Maroun Mahfoud

== Players ==
=== Current squad ===
The following 22 players were called up for the friendly matches against Palestine on 10 and 13 October 2026.

Information correct as of 13 October 2026, after the match against Palestine.

No.	Pos.	Player	Date of birth (age)	Caps	Goals	Club
1	GK	Lamitta El Dib	9 February 2005 (age 21)	15	0	(Lebanese Football Association) Nejmeh
22	GK	Marie-Joe Chebli	14 February 2009 (age 17)	1	0	(Lebanese Football Association) Lebanon United
23	GK	Clara Khalil	28 May 2004 (age 22)	8	0	(Lebanese Football Association) Jounieh
2	DF	Karly Harfouche	3 August 2004 (age 22)	9	0	(Turkish Football Federation) 1207 Antalya
3	DF	Gianna Frangieh	11 November 2009 (age 17)	2	0	(Lebanese Football Association) Salam Zgharta
4	DF	Amina Karime	20 December 2005 (age 20)	19	0	(Lebanese Football Association) Jwaya
5	DF	Waed Raed	9 November 2006 (age 20)	31	1	(Lebanese Football Association) Jwaya
13	DF	Lara Bou Hamra	16 February 2004 (age 22)	9	0	(Lebanese Football Association) Jwaya
16	DF	Haya Najjad	6 January 2008 (age 18)	1	0	(Lebanese Football Association) BFA
6	MF	Mya Mhanna	16 November 2006 (age 20)	14	1	Free agent
7	MF	Cecile Iskandar	12 March 2007 (age 19)	10	1	(Lebanese Football Association) Nejmeh
8	MF	Zahwa Arabi	2 November 2005 (age 21)	32	2	(Lebanese Football Association) No Limits
10	MF	Syntia Salha	12 January 2003 (age 23)	41	9	(Cyprus Football Association) Xylofagou
18	MF	Lama Abdine	9 September 2006 (age 20)	12	0	(Lebanese Football Association) BFA
19	MF	Joya-Maria Azzi	23 September 2000 (age 26)	14	1	(Lebanese Football Association) Jounieh
9	FW	Christy Maalouf	20 December 2005 (age 20)	33	18	(French Football Federation) Paris FC 2
11	FW	Lili Iskandar (captain)	16 May 2002 (age 24)	39	17	(Cyprus Football Association) Omonia
12	FW	Ayana Rezkallah	21 April 2008 (age 18)	15	0	(Lebanese Football Association) Nejmeh
14	FW	Lynn Moutran	25 August 2008 (age 18)	2	0	(Lebanese Football Association) BFA
15	FW	Sara Issa	18 February 2009 (age 17)	4	0	(Lebanese Football Association) BFA
17	FW	Lea Douaihy	17 March 2005 (age 21)	4	0	(Lebanese Football Association) Salam Zgharta
20	FW	Sally Al Moujarkach	20 August 1998 (age 28)	2	0	(Lebanese Football Association) No Limits

=== Recent call-ups ===
The following players have been called up to the national team in the past 12 months but are not part of the current squad.

Pos.	Player	Date of birth (age)	Caps	Goals	Club	Latest call-up
GK	Sinal Breiche	3 March 2003 (age 23)	17	0	(Lebanon) BFA	2025 WAFF Women's Championship
GK	Marcelle Skaiki	1 February 2007 (age 19)	3	0	(Lebanon) Jwaya	2025 WAFF Women's Championship
DF	Dima Al Kasti	13 December 2001 (age 24)	34	5	(Jordan) Orthodox	2025 WAFF Women's Championship
DF	Yasmina Nassar	1 April 2011 (age 15)	2	0	(Lebanon) BFA	2025 WAFF Women's Championship
DF	Celine Bitar	17 July 2007 (age 19)	1	0	(Lebanon) Salam Zgharta	2025 WAFF Women's Championship
MF	Shereen Karnib	9 June 2007 (age 19)	2	0	(Australia) APIA Leichhardt FC	2025 WAFF Women's Championship
MF	Yara El Gitani	24 September 2010 (age 16)	1	0	(Lebanon) Nejmeh	2025 WAFF Women's Championship
MF	Gaelle Abou Malhab	4 March 2010 (age 16)	0	0	(Lebanon) BFA	2025 WAFF Women's Championship
FW	Lea El Hage Ali	4 June 2008 (age 18)	13	0	(Lebanon) BFA	2025 WAFF Women's Championship
FW	Maryam Lazkani	3 July 2007 (age 19)	6	0	(United States) San Jose State Spartans	2025 WAFF Women's Championship

== Individual records ==
As of 13 October 2026
Players in bold are still active with Lebanon.

=== Most-capped players ===
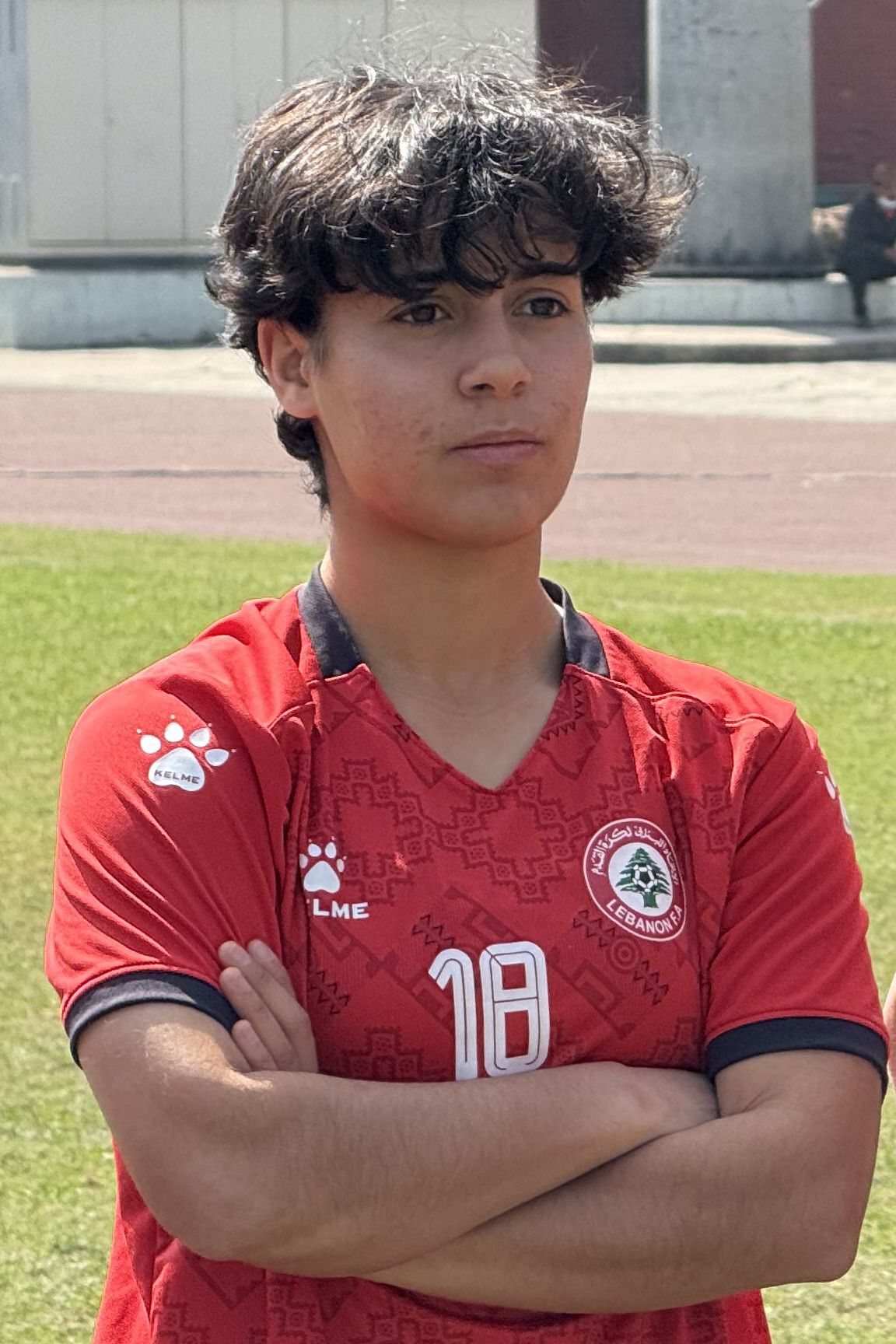
Syntia Salha is Lebanon's most-capped player with 41 appearances.

Rank	Player	Caps	Goals	Period
1	**Syntia Salha**	41	9	2021–present
3	**Lili Iskandar**	39	17	2018–present
2	Nathalie Matar	37	0	2015–2025
4	**Dima Al Kasti**	34	5	2019–present
5	**Christy Maalouf**	33	18	2021–present
6	**Zahwa Arabi**	32	2	2021–present
7	**Waed Raed**	31	1	2021–present
8	Rana Al Mokdad	29	1	2017–2024
9	Samira Awad	27	5	2018–2024
10	Yara Bou Rada	26	2	2018–2024

=== Top scorers ===
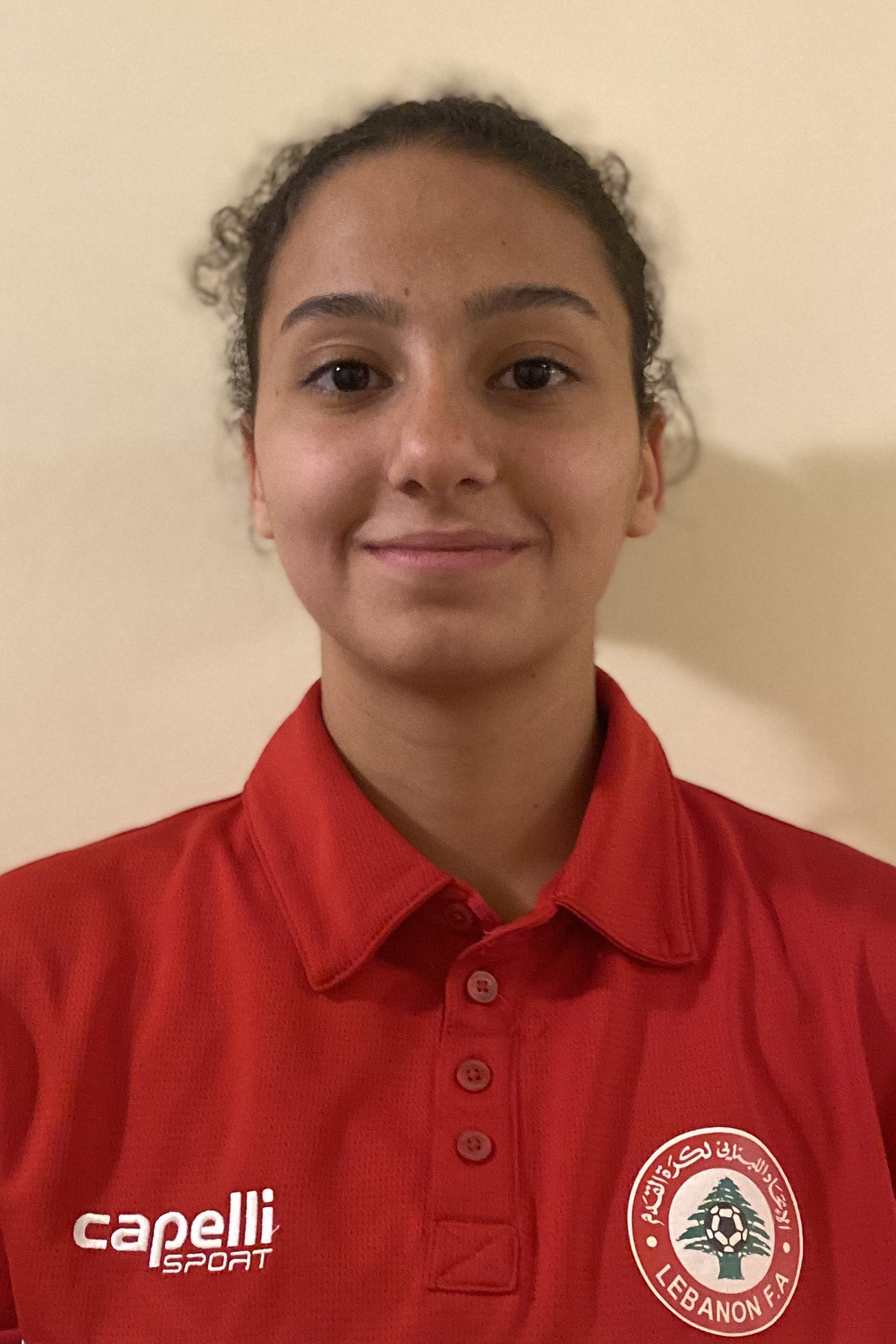
With 18 goals, Christy Maalouf is Lebanon's all-time top goalscorer.

Rank	Player	Goals	Caps	Average	Period
1	**Christy Maalouf**	18	33	0.55	2021–present
2	**Lili Iskandar**	17	39	0.44	2018–present
3	**Syntia Salha**	9	41	0.22	2021–present
4	Hanin Tamim	8	21	0.38	2018–2024
5	Sara Bakri	7	22	0.32	2006–2017
6	Nadia Assaf	5	7	0.71	2007–2013
6	Pilar Khoury	5	14	0.36	2021–2025
6	Samira Awad	5	27	0.19	2018–2024
6	**Dima Al Kasti**	5	34	0.15	2019–present
10	Iman Chaito	3	3	1.00	2007
10	Hiba El Jaafil	3	14	0.21	2006–2013
10	Lara Bahlawan	3	17	0.18	2011–2021

== Competitive record ==
=== FIFA Women's World Cup ===
FIFA Women's World Cup record										Qualification record						
Host nation(s) and year	Round	Pos	Pld	W	D	L	GF	GA	Squad	Outcome	Pld	W	D	L	GF	GA
(China) 1991	Did not enter									Did not enter						
(Sweden) 1995	Did not enter									Did not enter						
(United States) 1999	Did not enter									Did not enter						
(United States) 2003	Did not enter									Did not enter						
(China) 2007	Did not enter									Did not enter						
(Germany) 2011	Did not enter									Did not enter						
(Canada) 2015	Did not qualify									The 2014 AFC Women's Asian Cup served as the qualifying tournament						
(France) 2019	Withdrew									Withdrew						
(Australia) (New Zealand) 2023	Did not qualify									The 2022 AFC Women's Asian Cup served as the qualifying tournament						
(Brazil) 2027	Did not qualify									The 2026 AFC Women's Asian Cup served as the qualifying tournament						
(Costa Rica) (Jamaica) (Mexico) (United States) 2031	To be determined									To be determined						
(United Kingdom) 2035	To be determined									To be determined						
Total	–	0/10	–	–	–	–	–	–	–	Total	–	–	–	–	–	–

=== Summer Olympics ===
Summer Olympics record										Qualification record						
Host nation(s) and year	Round	Pos	Pld	W	D	L	GF	GA	Squad	Outcome	Pld	W	D	L	GF	GA
(United States) 1996	Did not enter									The 1995 FIFA Women's World Cup served as the qualifying tournament						
(Australia) 2000	Did not enter									The 1999 FIFA Women's World Cup served as the qualifying tournament						
(Greece) 2004	Did not enter									Did not enter						
(China) 2008	Did not enter									Did not enter						
(United Kingdom) 2012	Did not enter									Did not enter						
(Brazil) 2016	Did not enter									Did not enter						
(Japan) 2020	Did not qualify									3rd of 3	2	0	0	2	0	12
(France) 2024	Did not qualify									2nd of 3	2	1	0	1	6	5
(United States) 2028	To be determined									To be determined						
Total	–	0/8	–	–	–	–	–	–	–	Total	4	1	0	3	6	17

=== AFC Women's Asian Cup ===
AFC Women's Asian Cup record										Qualification record						
Host nation(s) and year	Round	Pos	Pld	W	D	L	GF	GA	Squad	Outcome	Pld	W	D	L	GF	GA
(Hong Kong) 1975	Did not enter									Did not enter						
(Taiwan) 1977	Did not enter									Did not enter						
(India) 1980	Did not enter									Did not enter						
(Hong Kong) 1981	Did not enter									Did not enter						
(Thailand) 1983	Did not enter									Did not enter						
(Hong Kong) 1986	Did not enter									Did not enter						
(Hong Kong) 1989	Did not enter									Did not enter						
(Japan) 1991	Did not enter									Did not enter						
(Malaysia) 1993	Did not enter									Did not enter						
(Malaysia) 1995	Did not enter									Did not enter						
(China) 1997	Did not enter									Did not enter						
(Philippines) 1999	Did not enter									Did not enter						
(Chinese Taipei) 2001	Did not enter									Did not enter						
(Thailand) 2003	Did not enter									Did not enter						
(Australia) 2006	Did not enter									Did not enter						
(Vietnam) 2008	Did not enter									Did not enter						
(China) 2010	Did not enter									Did not enter						
(Vietnam) 2014	Did not qualify									3rd of 4	3	1	0	2	12	10
(Jordan) 2018	Withdrew									Withdrew						
(India) 2022	Did not qualify									2nd of 4	3	2	0	1	4	4
(Australia) 2026	Did not qualify									4th of 5	4	2	2	5	7	
(Uzbekistan) 2029	To be determined									To be determined						
Total	–	0/21	–	–	–	–	–	–	–	Total	10	5	0	5	21	21

=== Arab Women's Cup ===
Arab Women's Cup record
Host nation(s) and year	Round	Pos	Pld	W	D	L	GF	GA	Squad
(Egypt) 2006	Group stage	7th of 7	2	0	0	2	0	20	Squad
(Egypt) 2021	Group stage	5th of 7	3	1	1	1	5	5	Squad
(Morocco) 2027	To be determined								
Total	Best: group stage	2/2	5	1	1	3	5	25	–

=== WAFF Women's Championship ===
WAFF Women's Championship record
Host nation(s) and year	Round	Pos	Pld	W	D	L	GF	GA	Squad
(Jordan) 2005	Did not enter								
(Jordan) 2007	Third place	3rd of 4	3	1	0	2	7	6	–
(United Arab Emirates) 2010	Did not enter								
(United Arab Emirates) 2011	Group stage	5th of 8	3	1	0	2	2	13	–
(Jordan) 2014	Did not enter								
(Bahrain) 2019	Third place	3rd of 5	4	2	0	2	8	6	Squad
(Jordan) 2022	Runners-up	2nd of 4	3	2	0	1	9	4	Squad
(Saudi Arabia) 2024	Semi-finals	3rd of 8	4	2	0	2	6	8	Squad
(Saudi Arabia) 2025	Group stage	5th of 6	2	0	0	2	0	8	Squad
Total	Best: runners-up	6/9	19	8	0	11	32	45	–

=== Other tournaments ===
Tournament	Round
(Egypt) 2010 Arabia Cup	Group stage
2021 Armenia Friendly Tournament	Fourth place
(Saudi Arabia) 2023 SAFF Friendly Tournament	Champions
(Nepal) 2025 Vianet Championship	Third place

== FIFA world rankings ==
Lebanon were first included in the FIFA World Ranking in September 2011, placing in 124th place. Until early 2021, FIFA's ranking criteria required teams to have been active in the previous 18 months to be listed. (Note: This inactivity limit was extended to 4 years in early 2021.) As Lebanon went inactive for 18 months for several periods, they were unranked in various years (2014, 2016, 2017, 2020). Lebanon's best ranking was 102nd in December 2013, and their worst was 145th between April and August 2021.

The table shows the position that Lebanon held in December of each year (and the current position as of 2026), as well as the highest and lowest positions annually.

Best ranking Worst ranking

Year	Position	Highest	Lowest
2011	127	124	127
2012	117	117	127
2013	102	102	111
2014	NR	109	119
2015	125	122	130
2016	NR	122	123
2017	NR	NR	NR
2018	134	134	134
2019	137	135	139
2020	NR	141	141
2021	140	140	145
2022	142	141	143
2023	134	134	142
2024	134	132	134
2025	130	125	131
2026	130	130	130

Last ranking: 16 June 2026

== See also ==
- List of women's national association football teams
- List of Lebanon women's national football team managers
- Lebanon women's national under-20 football team
- Lebanon women's national under-17 football team
- Lebanese Women's Football League
- Women's football in Lebanon
