= Kuwait women's national football team =

Women's national association football team representing Kuwait

Kuwait
- Association: Kuwait Football Association
- Confederation: AFC (Asia)
- Sub-confederation: WAFF (West Asia)
- Head coach: Vacant
- FIFA code: KUW
First colours	Second colours

FIFA ranking
- Current: NR (16 June 2026)
- Highest: 110 (December 2013)
- Lowest: 124 (September 2014)

First international
- Palestine 17–0 Kuwait (Abu Dhabi, UAE; 22 February 2010)

Biggest defeat
- Kuwait 0–21 Jordan (Amman, Jordan; 8 June 2013)

WAFF Championship
- Appearances: 1 (first in 2010)
- Best result: Group stage (2010)

The Kuwait women's national football team represents Kuwait in international women's association football and is governed by the Kuwait Football Association (KFA).

== History ==
The Organizing Committee of GCC Women's Sports Committee organizes women's football events in Kuwait in an effort to support the women's national team, with blue shirts, white shorts, and blue socks as the main kit colors.

As of 1999, the women's national team had not competed at the Women's World Cup. They had never entered the Asian Women's Championship as of 1999. As of June 2017, the team was not ranked in the world by FIFA.

=== Background and development ===
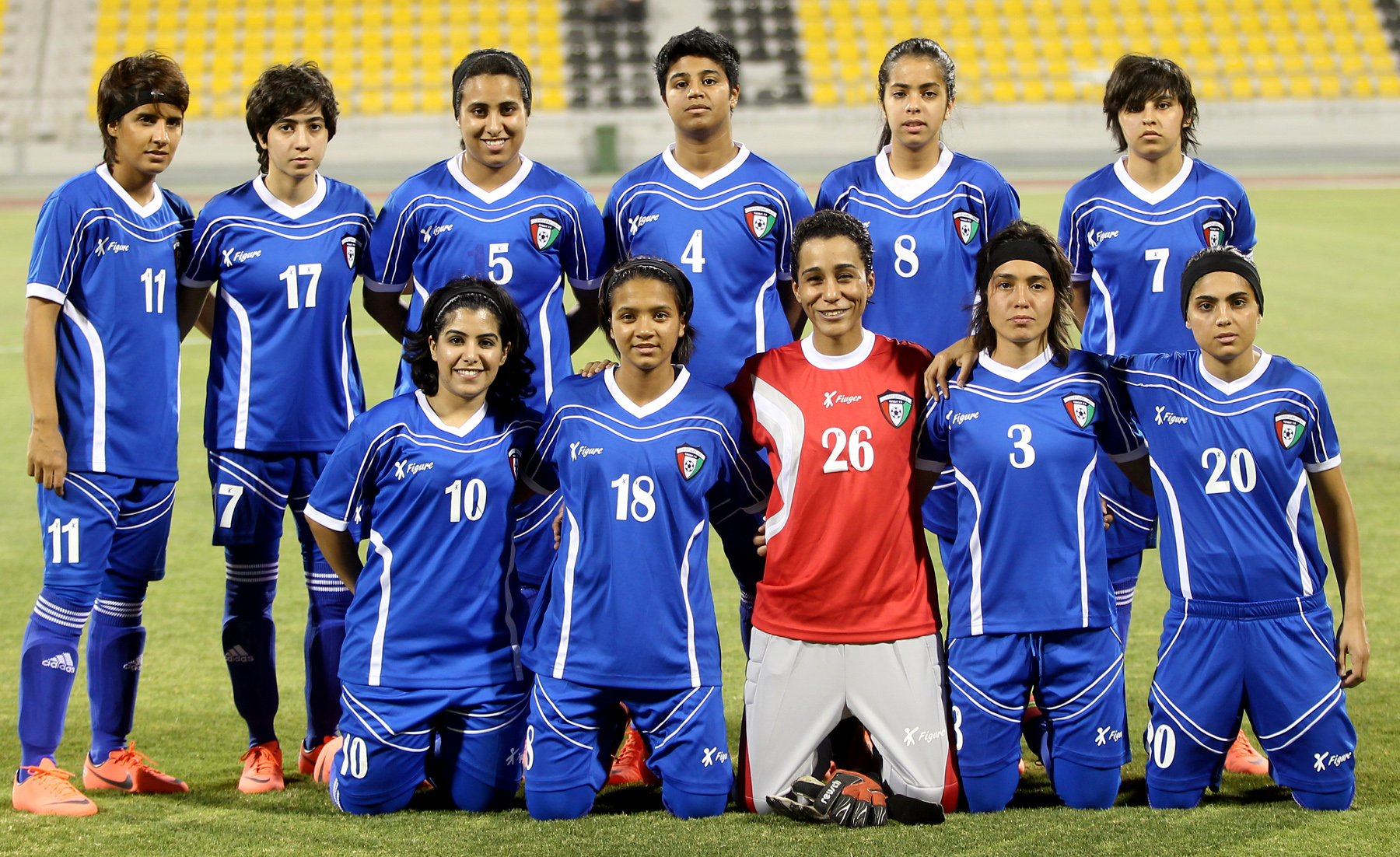
Kuwait women's national football team in 2012

In 2012 it was written that development of women's football in the Middle East and central Asia dated back only about ten years. The national federation became a FIFA affiliate in 1962.

The first known matches from the women's national team came in the 2010 WAFF Championship where they lost both matches to Palestine and the UAE.

After several friendly matches, they participated in 2014 AFC Women's Asian Cup qualification for the first time, with heavy losses against Uzbekistan, Jordan, and Lebanon resulting in the FA disbanding the team to focus on youth football. A squad would be assembled in 2017 to play against a team from the British Military Corps, but no further matches have been noted.

== Results and fixtures ==
The following is a list of match results in the last 12 months, as well as any future matches that have been scheduled.

Legend

Win Draw Loss Fixture

== Coaching staff ==
Name	Role
Head coach	Vacant
Assistant coach	Vacant
Goalkeeping coach	Vacant
Fitness coach	Vacant
Match analyst	Vacant
Team Doctor	Vacant
Physiotherapist	Vacant
Masseur	Vacant
Team manager	Vacant
Technical director	Vacant

=== Manager history ===
- (Kuwait) Fahad Kameel (20??–2019)

== Players ==
=== Current squad ===
The following 25 players were called up for friendly matches against xxxx on xxx.

Caps and goals correct as of 26 February 2023

No.	Pos.	Player	Date of birth (age)	Caps	Goals	Club

=== Recent call-ups ===
The following players have been called up to the squad in the past 12 months.

Pos.	Player	Date of birth (age)	Caps	Goals	Club	Latest call-up
^{INJ} Player withdrew from the squad due to an injury.^{PRE} Preliminary squad.^{SUS} Player is serving a suspension.^{WD} Player withdrew for personal reasons.

== Records ==
- Active players in **bold**, statistics correct as of 28 September 2022.

=== Most-capped players ===
#	Player	Year(s)	Caps

=== Top goalscorers ===
#	Player	Year(s)	Goals	Caps
1				
2				

== Competitive record ==
=== FIFA Women's World Cup ===
FIFA Women's World Cup record
Year	Result	Position	GP	W	D*	L	GF	GA	GD
(China) 1991 to (Germany) 2011	Did not enter								
(Canada) 2015	Did not qualify								
(France) 2019 to (Brazil) 2027	Did not enter								
(Costa Rica) (Jamaica) (Mexico) (United States) 2031	To be determined								
(United Kingdom) 2035	To be determined								
Total	0/12	-	-	-	-	-	-	-	-

*Draws include knockout matches decided on penalty kicks.

=== AFC Women's Asian Cup ===
AFC Women's Asian Cup record
Year	Result	GP	W	D*	L	GF	GA	GD
(Hong Kong) 1975 to (China) 2010	Did not enter							
(Vietnam) 2014	Did not qualify							
(Jordan) 2018	Did not enter							
(India) 2022	Did not enter							
(Australia) 2026	Did not enter							
(Uzbekistan) 2029	To be determined							
Total	0/20	-	-	-	-	-	-	-

*Draws include knockout matches decided on penalty kicks.

=== WAFF Women's Championship ===
Hosts / Year	Result	GP	W	D*	L	GS	GA	GD
(Jordan) 2005	Did not enter							
(Jordan) 2007	Did not enter							
(United Arab Emirates) 2010	Group stage	2	0	0	2	0	24	−24
(United Arab Emirates) 2011	Did not enter							
(Jordan) 2014	Did not enter							
(Bahrain) 2019	Did not enter							
(Jordan) 2022	Did not enter							
(Saudi Arabia) 2024	Did not enter							
Total	1/8	2	0	0	2	0	24	−24

*Draws include knockout matches decided on penalty kicks.

== Head-to-head record ==
As of 21 March 2018

Positive Record Neutral Record Negative Record

Opponent	Pld	W	D	L	GF	GA	GD
Jordan	1	0	0	1	0	21	−21
Lebanon	1	0	0	1	1	12	−11
Maldives	2	0	1	1	2	4	−2
Nepal	1	0	0	1	0	8	−8
Palestine	1	0	0	1	0	17	−17
Qatar	1	0	0	1	0	2	−2
United Arab Emirates	1	0	0	1	0	7	−7
Uzbekistan	1	0	0	1	0	18	−18
Total	9	0	1	8	3	68	−65

== See also ==
- Sport in Kuwait
  - Football in Kuwait
    - Women's football in Kuwait
- Kuwait women's national under-20 football team
- Kuwait women's national under-17 football team
- Kuwaiti Women's League
