= Jordan women's national football team results =

This article lists the results and fixtures for the Jordan women's national football team.

Nicknamed "Al-Nashmeyat" (Arabic: النشميات) represents the Hashemite Kingdom of Jordan in international women's association football. Its governing body is the Jordan Football Association (JFA) and it competes as a member of the Asian Football Confederation (AFC). The national team's first activity came in 2005, when they took part in the inaugural West Asian Championship, which they won.

Formed in 2005, the team played its first international match on 18 September 2005, defeating Bahrain 6–1. Their biggest victory came in 2013 with a 23–0 win over Kuwait, while their largest defeat remains the 13–0 loss to Japan in 2006.

== Results ==
=== 2005 ===
| 18 September Friendly | Jordan | 6–1 | Bahrain | Amman, Jordan |
| | Jbarah 15', 22', 30'; Al-Naber 55'; Abu-Kasheh 60'; Al-Roos 70' | Report | | Stadium: Amman International Stadium |

| 23 September 2005 WAFF Championship | Jordan | 9–0 | Palestine | Amman, Jordan |
| | Jbarah 17', 19', 30', 74'; Zakaria 21'; Khraisat 28', 35'; Al-Naber 49'; Al-Azab 53' | Report | | Stadium: Amman International Stadium |

| 25 September 2005 WAFF Championship | Jordan | 9–0 | Bahrain | Amman, Jordan |
| | S. Al-Naber 10', 26', 70'; Jbarah 18', 39', 67'; Khraisat 38'; Al-Azab 49'; Al-Roos 65' | | | Stadium: Amman International Stadium |

| 27 September 2005 WAFF Championship | Syria | 0–6 | Jordan | Amman, Jordan |
| | | Report | Al-Azab 10', 15'; Jbarah 30'; Khair 35', 60'; S. Al-Naber 70' | Stadium: Amman International Stadium |

| 1 October 2005 WAFF Championship | Iran | 1–2 | Jordan | Amman, Jordan |
| | 13' | Report | Jbarah 30', 50' | Stadium: Amman International Stadium |

=== 2006 ===
| 3 November Friendly | Malaysia | 1–3 | Jordan | Kuala Lumpur, Malaysia |
| | | Report | S. Al-Naber 30', 72'; Fraij 65' |

| 30 November 2006 Asian Games GS | Japan | 13–0 | Jordan | Doha, Qatar |
| 17:15 | Yanagita 16', 71'; Miyama 20'; Sudo 32'; Arakawa 34'; Sakaguchi 49', 54', 65', 77', 81'; Sawa 78', 90'; Sakai 85' | Report | | Stadium: Al-Arabi Stadium; Attendance: 251; Referee: Ri Hong-sil (North Korea) |

| 4 December 2006 Asian Games GS | Jordan | 0–12 | China | Al Rayyan, Qatar |
| 19:45 | | Report | Han Duan 9', 15', 45+2', 47'; Ren Liping 22', 35'; Wang Kun 26', 39'; Al-Zogheir 28' (o.g.); Li Jie 65'; Ma Xiaoxu 68', 73' | Stadium: Al-Gharrafa Stadium; Attendance: 52; Referee: Krystyna Szokolai (Australia) |

| 7 December 2006 Asian Games GS | Jordan | 0–5 | Thailand | Doha, Qatar |
| 19:45 | | Report | Darut 27'; Supaporn 39'; Chidtawan 48'; Sukunya 70', 83' | Stadium: Al-Arabi Stadium; Attendance: 157; Referee: Deng Junxia (China) |

=== 2007 ===
| 12 August Friendly | Iran | 3–2 | Jordan | Tehran, Iran |
| | | Report | Khraisat 30'; Jbarah 70' |

| 14 August Friendly | Iran | 3–2 | Jordan | Tehran, Iran |
| | | Report | Jebreen 44'; S. Al-Naber 65' |

| 3 September 2007 WAFF Championship | Jordan | 3–0 | Lebanon | Jordan |
| | S. Al-Naber 21'; Al-Azab 25'; Jbarah 50' | Report |

| 5 September 2007 WAFF Championship | Syria | 1–7 | Jordan | Jordan |
| | | Report | Jbarah 9', 31'; Jebreen 47'; S. Al-Naber 65' (pen.), 75' (pen.); Khraisat 86'; Fraij 89' |

| 7 September 2007 WAFF Championship | Iran | 1–2 | Jordan | Jordan |
| | | Report | Jbarah 50'; S. Al-Naber 65' |

=== 2009 ===
| 25 April 2010 AFC Asian Cup qualification | Kyrgyzstan | 1–7 | Jordan | Kuala Lumpur, Malaysia |
| 17:00 | Pokachalova 75' | Report | Al-Azab 1'; S. Al-Naber 11', 38'; Taalaibek 14' (o.g.); Jbarah 18', 36'; Jebreen 90+2' | Stadium: KLFA Stadium; Attendance: 100; Referee: Kamnueng Pannipar (Thailand) |

| 29 April 2010 AFC Asian Cup qualification | Jordan | 9–0 | Maldives | Kuala Lumpur, Malaysia |
| 19:30 | Al-Nahar 9', 26', 67'; Jbarah 15', 27'; S. Al-Naber 52', 60', 71' (pen.), 90+2' | Report | | Stadium: KLFA Stadium; Attendance: 70; Referee: Kamnueng Pannipar (Thailand) |

| 1 May 2010 AFC Asian Cup qualification | Jordan | 5–0 | Palestine | Kuala Lumpur, Malaysia |
| 17:00 | Al-Naber 24', 50'; Jbarah 35', 42'; Al-Azab 44' | Report | | Stadium: KLFA Stadium; Attendance: 60; Referee: Rita Gani (Malaysia) |

| 3 May 2010 AFC Asian Cup qualification | Uzbekistan | 2–2 | Jordan | Kuala Lumpur, Malaysia |
| 19:30 | Turapova 24'; Sarikova 56' | Report | Al-Naber 31' (pen.); Jbarah 74' | Stadium: KLFA Stadium; Attendance: 100; Referee: Kamnueng Pannipar (Thailand) |

| 10 July 2010 AFC Asian Cup qualification | Jordan | 1–0 | Chinese Taipei | Hsinying City, Taiwan |
| 15:30 | Jebreen 74' | Report | | Stadium: Tainan County Stadium; Attendance: 500; Referee: Semaksuk Praew (Thailand) |

| 12 July 2010 AFC Asian Cup qualification | Myanmar | 3–0 | Jordan | Hsinying City, Taiwan |
| 15:30 | | Report | Khin Marlar Tun 18'; Than Than Htwe 33'; Myint Myint Aye 57' | Stadium: Tainan County Stadium; Attendance: 200; Referee: Rita Gani (Malaysia) |

| 26 October Friendly | Palestine | 2–2 | Jordan | Palestine |
| | | Report | Jebreen 8'; Fraij 85' |

=== 2010 ===
| 20 February 2010 WAFF Championship GS | Jordan | 4–1 | Bahrain | Abu Dhabi, UA Emirates |
| | S. Al-Naber 55' (pen.), 78' (pen.), 83'; Jbarah 88' | Report |

| 24 February 2010 WAFF Championship GS | Iran | 0–4 | Jordan | Abu Dhabi, UA Emirates |
| | | Report | S. Al-Naber 40' (pen.); Jebreen 45'; Khair 70'; Al-Azab 85' (pen.) |

| 26 February 2010 WAFF Championship SF | Jordan | 10–0 | Palestine | Abu Dhabi, UA Emirates |
| | Jebreen 13'; Al-Azab 28', 49', 62'; Jbarah 42', 55'; Petro 65', 73'; Khraisat 71'; S. Al-Naber 90+2' | Report |

| 28 February 2010 WAFF Championship F | Jordan | 0–1 | United Arab Emirates | Abu Dhabi, UA Emirates |
| | | Report | Fatima Mubarak 47' |

| 19 July Friendly | Syria | 0–8 | Jordan | Damascus, Syria |
| | | Report | Khair 16', 66'; N. Al-Naber 20', 50'; Al-Azab 22'; S. Al-Naber 33', 40'; Zakaria 41' |

| 21 July Friendly | Syria | 1–4 | Jordan | Damascus, Syria |
| | | Report | S. Al-Naber 12', 20', 30'; N. Al-Naber 70' |

| 14 October Friendly | Bahrain | 1–4 | Jordan | Manama, Bahrain |
| | | Report | Jbarah 20', 50', 66'; S. Al-Naber 35' | Stadium: Al Ahli Stadium |

| 19 October 2010 Arabia Cup GS | Jordan | 20–0 | Iraq | Manama, Bahrain |
| | S. Al-Naber 3', 5' (pen.), 19', 25', 77'; Jbarah 7', 18', 41', 50', 65', 66', 69', 72'; Al-Azab 27', 41'; Abu-Kasheh 45'; Jebreen 52', 56'; Khraisat 80'; Al-Hyasat 85' | Report | | Stadium: Al Ahli Stadium |

| 21 October 2010 Arabia Cup GS | Jordan | 3–1 | Lebanon | Manama, Bahrain |
| | S. Al-Naber 39'; Jbarah 52', 69' | Report | Bakri | Stadium: Al Ahli Stadium |

| 23 October 2010 Arabia Cup GS | Egypt | 1–0 | Jordan | Manama, Bahrain |
| | | Report | | Stadium: Al Ahli Stadium |

| 25 October 2010 Arabia Cup SF | Bahrain | 0–3 | Jordan | Riffa, Bahrain |
| | | Report | Al-Hyasat 20'; Al-Azab 35'; S. Al-Naber 76' | Stadium: Bahrain National Stadium |

| 28 October 2010 Arabia Cup F | Jordan | 1–0 | Egypt | Riffa, Bahrain |
| | S. Al-Naber 80' | Report | | Stadium: Bahrain National Stadium |

| 14 November 2010 Asian Games GS | China | 10–1 | Jordan | Guangzhou, China |
| 19:00 | Ma Jun 7', 44'; Qu Shanshan 13', 17'; Xu Yuan 14', 84'; Li Lin 39', 46'; Liu Huana 54'; Pang Fengyue 90' | Report | Jbarah 19' | Stadium: University Town Stadium; Attendance: 23,600; Referee: Pannipar Kamnueng (Thailand) |

| 16 November 2010 Asian Games GS | Jordan | 0–5 | South Korea | Guangzhou, China |
| 16:00 | | Report | Ji So-yun 4', 32' (pen.), 76'; Kwon Eun-som 39'; Yoo Young-a 66' | Stadium: University Town Stadium; Attendance: 14;360; Referee: Jacqui Melksham (Australia) |

| 18 November 2010 Asian Games GS | Vietnam | 3–0 | Jordan | Guangzhou, China |
| 19:00 | Nguyễn Thị Hòa 10', 60'; Nguyễn Thị Muôn 35' | Report | | Stadium: Huangpu Sports Center Stadium; Attendance: 8,045; Referee: Abirami Naidu (Singapore) |

| 28 December Friendly | Jordan | 4–4 | Tunisia | Zarqa, Jordan |
| | S. Al-Naber 47', 81', 90'; Jbarah 83' | Report | | Stadium: Prince Mohammed Stadium |

| 30 December Friendly | Jordan | 0–3 | Tunisia | Zarqa, Jordan |
| | | Report | | Stadium: Prince Mohammed Stadium |

=== 2011 ===
| 8 March 2012 AFC Olympic Qualifying Tournament | Jordan | 1–1 | Bahrain | Zarqa, Jordan |
| 18:00 | S. Khraisat 34' | Report | Al-Hashmi 2' | Stadium: Prince Mohammed Stadium; Attendance: 160; Referee: Nami Sato (Japan) |

| 10 March 2012 AFC Olympic Qualifying Tournament | Iran | 1–1 | Jordan | Zarqa, Jordan |
| 18:00 | Hatamnejad 55' | Report | Jbarah 24' | Stadium: Prince Mohammed Stadium; Attendance: 200; Referee: Kim Sook-hee (South Korea) |

| 12 March 2012 AFC Olympic Qualifying Tournament | Jordan | 6–0 | Palestine | Zarqa, Jordan |
| 18:00 | Jbarah 3', 32'; S. Al-Naber 6'; Al-Azab 21', 51'; Al-Hyasat 90+2' | Report | | Stadium: Prince Mohammed Stadium; Attendance: 200; Referee: Kim Sook-hee (South Korea) |

| 15 May Friendly | Netherlands U19 | 9–0 | Jordan | Poortugaal, Netherlands |
| | Martens 13'; Van de Sanden 33'; Van de Wetering 37', 48'; Jansen 38', 75', 76'; Van Dongen 46', 81' | Report | | Stadium: Sportpark Albrandswaard Poortugaal |

| 5 June 2012 AFC Olympic Qualifying Tournament | Jordan | 0–3 | Uzbekistan | Amman, Jordan |
| 19:00 | | Report | Turdiboeva 76'; Sarikova 78', 81' | Stadium: King Abdullah Stadium; Attendance: 500; Referee: Kim Sook-hee (South Korea) |

| 7 June 2012 AFC Olympic Qualifying Tournament | Vietnam | 1–0 | Jordan | Amman, Jordan |
| 19:00 | Nguyễn Thị Hòa 67' | Report | | Stadium: King Abdullah Stadium; Attendance: 400; Referee: Rita Gani (Malaysia) |

| 10 June 2012 AFC Olympic Qualifying Tournament | Thailand | 7–0 | Jordan | Amman, Jordan |
| 19:00 | Wilaiporn 19'; Nuengruethai 33'; Junpen 36'; Pitsamai 40'; Taneekarn 49'; Nisa 64', 75' | Report | | Stadium: King Abdullah Stadium; Attendance: 400; Referee: Wang Jia (China) |

| 15 September Friendly | Jordan | 10–1 | Lebanon | Amman, Jordan |
| | Sweilem 10', 15'; Al-Masri 20'; Khraisat 30', 33'; Jebreen 50', 66'; Jbarah 70', 80', 88' | Report | Bakri 52' (pen.) |

| 17 September Friendly | Jordan | 2–0 | Lebanon | Amman, Jordan |
| | Jbarah 14'; S. Al-Naber 34' (pen.) | Report |

| 24 September Friendly | Egypt | 0–0 | Jordan | Cairo, Egypt |
| | | Report |

| 26 September Friendly | Egypt | 2–1 | Jordan | 6th of October, Egypt |
| | Fekry (?) | Report | Jbarah 50' |

| 3 October 2011 WAFF Championship GS | Jordan | 8–1 | Palestine | Abu Dhabi, UA Emirates |
| 13:30 | S. Al-Naber 28'; Jbarah 50', 55', 60', 73', 90+2'; Sweilem 82'; Al-Majali 88' | Report | Hussein 26' | Stadium: Zayed Bin Sultan Stadium |

| 5 October 2011 WAFF Championship GS | Jordan | 2–2 | Bahrain | Abu Dhabi, UA Emirates |
| 14:15 | Al-Majali 56'; Jbarah 76' | Report | Al-Hashmi 31', 90' | Stadium: Zayed Bin Sultan Stadium |

| 7 October 2011 WAFF Championship GS | Iraq | 0–4 | Jordan | Abu Dhabi, UA Emirates |
| 13:30 | | Report | Alnaber 6'; Jbarah 21'; Alnahar 46'; Dihmis 47' | Stadium: Zayed Bin Sultan Stadium |

| 10 October 2011 WAFF Championship SF | Iran | 3–2 | Jordan | Abu Dhabi, UA Emirates |
| 19:30 | Rahimi 56', 72', 82' | Report | Jebreen 3'; Al-Majali 86' | Stadium: Zayed Bin Sultan Stadium |

| 12 October 2011 WAFF Championship 3rd place | Bahrain | 0–0 (4–3 p) | Jordan | Abu Dhabi, UA Emirates |
| 16:15 | | Report | | Stadium: Zayed Bin Sultan Stadium |
| | Penalties |
| | Tobellah (penalty scored); Al-Mudhahki (penalty scored); Al-Hashmi (penalty scored); Khamis (penalty scored) | | (penalty scored) S. Al-Naber; (penalty scored) Khraisat; (penalty scored) Khair |

=== 2013 ===
| 11 February Friendly | Iran | 2–1 | Jordan | Tehran, Iran |
| | | Report | Al-Nahar 45' |

| 13 February Friendly | Iran | 2–0 | Jordan | Tehran, Iran |
| | | Report |

| 1 April Friendly | Jordan | 4–0 | Palestine | Amman, Jordan |
| | Jbarah 6', 8', 57'; Al-Nahar 55' | Report | | Stadium: King Abdullah II Stadium |

| 3 April Friendly | Jordan | 6–2 | Palestine | Amman, Jordan |
| | Al-Masri 48'; Al-Azab 52' (pen.); Dihmis 57'; Undefined 65' (o.g.); Jebreen 85'; Jbarah 89' | Report | | Stadium: King Abdullah II Stadium |

| 26 April Friendly | Vietnam | 1–1 | Jordan | Hanoi, Vietnam |
| | Nguyễn Thị Liễu 90' | Report | Jbarah 17' | Stadium: Hàng Đẫy Stadium |

| 28 April Friendly | Vietnam | 1–0 | Jordan | Hanoi, Vietnam |
| | Huỳnh Như 70' | Report | | Stadium: Vietnam YTF Center |

| 16 May Friendly | Jordan | 1–5 | Vietnam | Zarqa, Jordan |
| | Jbarah 49' | Report | Nguyễn Thị Tuyết Dung 20', 61'; Huỳnh Như 30', 38'; Nguyễn Thị Nguyệt 81' | Stadium: Prince Mohammed Stadium |

| 18 May Friendly | Jordan | 0–2 | Vietnam | Amman, Jordan |
| | | Report | Nguyễn Thị Minh Nguyệt (?); Trần Thị Kim Hồng (?) |

| 5 June 2014 AFC Asian Cup qualification | Jordan | 5–0 | Lebanon | Amman, Jordan |
| 19:00 | Al-Masri 21'; S. Al-Naber 33', 40'; Khraisat 53', 59' | Report | | Stadium: Amman International Stadium; Attendance: 1,000; Referee: Park Ji-Yeong (South Korea) |

| 7 June 2014 AFC Asian Cup qualification | Kuwait | 0–21 | Jordan | Amman, Jordan |
| 19:00 | | Report | Jebreen 3', 70'; Jbarah 16', 18', 19', 28', 32', 45+1', 53', 81'; S. Al-Naber 17', 35', 38', 72'; Al-Nahar 20', 43', 56', 71', 84', 90+1'; Al-Masri 78' | Stadium: Amman International Stadium; Attendance: 500; Referee: Saltanat Norouzi (Iran) |

| 9 June 2014 AFC Asian Cup qualification | Uzbekistan | 0–4 | Jordan | Amman, Jordan |
| 19:00 | | Report | Khraisat 57', 80'; Jebreen 59'; S. Al-Naber 75' | Stadium: Amman International Stadium; Attendance: 2,500; Referee: Maria Rebello (India) |

| 3 September Friendly | Laos | 0–5 | Jordan | Vientiane, Laos |
| 12:00 | | Report | Al-Nahar 22'; Khraisat 50'; Sweilem 55'; Jebreen 60'; Al-Sahawneh 70' | Stadium: Laos National Stadium |

| 5 September Friendly | Laos | 4–3 | Jordan | Vientiane, Laos |
| 12:00 | | Report | Jbarah 30'; Al-Sahawneh 50'; Jebreen 70' | Stadium: Laos National Stadium |

| 9 September 2013 AFF Championship GS | Jordan | 1–0 | Malaysia | Yangon, Myanmar |
| 16:00 | S. Al-Naber 83' | Report | | Stadium: Thuwunna Stadium; Referee: Seinn Cho Aung (Myanmar) |

| 11 September 2013 AFF Championship GS | Jordan | 0–4 | Thailand | Yangon, Myanmar |
| 16:00 | | Report | Nisa 12', 74', 75'; Rattikan 59' | Stadium: Thuwunna Stadium; Referee: Aye Aye Maw (Myanmar) |

| 13 September 2013 AFF Championship GS | Australia U19 | 5–1 | Jordan | Yangon, Myanmar |
| 12:00 | Raso 5', 65'; Andrews 10', 20'; Logarzo 78' | Report | Jebreen 21' | Stadium: Thuwunna Stadium |

| 15 September 2013 AFF Championship GS | Jordan | 0–4 | Vietnam | Yangon, Myanmar |
| 12:00 | | Report | Lê Thị Thương 19'; Lê Thu Thanh Hương 30', 72'; Nguyễn Thị Muôn 84' | Stadium: Thuwunna Stadium |

=== 2014 ===
| 15 April 2014 WAFF Championship | Jordan | 5–0 | Bahrain | Amman, Jordan |
| 16:00 | Khraisat 59'; S. Al-Naber 65', 67'; Al-Masri 70'; Jbarah 75' | Report | | Stadium: Petra Stadium; Attendance: 500; Referee: Hussein Abo Yehia (Lebanon) |

| 17 April 2014 WAFF Championship | Qatar | 0–7 | Jordan | Amman, Jordan |
| 16:00 | | Report | Al-Nahar 9', 14', 38', 47' (pen.); Sweilem 40'; Al-Sufy 43'; Khalil 85' | Stadium: Petra Stadium; Attendance: 800; Referee: Mohammad Ibdeir (Palestine) |

| 19 April 2014 WAFF Championship | Jordan | 10–0 | Palestine | Amman, Jordan |
| 16:00 | Al-Masri 6', 24'; Jebreen 11'; Al-Hyasat 34', 71'; Khraisat 39'; Jbarah 48', 52'; S. Al-Naber 76'; Al-Majali 79' | Report | | Stadium: Petra Stadium; Attendance: 1,000; Referee: Abdulrahman Al-Jassim (Qatar) |

| 14 May 2014 AFC Asian Cup GS | Vietnam | 3–1 | Jordan | Ho Chi Minh City, Vietnam |
| 13:15 | Nguyễn Thị Muôn 18'; Lê Thu Thanh Hương 36', 84' | Report | Jbarah 34' | Stadium: Thống Nhất Stadium; Attendance: 5,000; Referee: Pannipar Kamnueng (Thailand) |

| 16 May 2014 AFC Asian Cup GS | Jordan | 1–3 | Australia | Ho Chi Minh City, Vietnam |
| 13:15 | S. Al-Naber 70' | Report | Gill 35', 50'; Gorry 66' | Stadium: Thống Nhất Stadium; Attendance: 1,200; Referee: Ri Hyang-ok (North Korea) |

| 18 May 2014 AFC Asian Cup GS | Japan | 7–0 | Jordan | Thủ Dầu Một, Vietnam |
| 15:15 | Kira 25', 90+3'; Nakajima 45+1', 75'; Sakaguchi 49', 81'; Al-Hyasat 69' (o.g.) | Report | | Stadium: Gò Đậu Stadium; Attendance: 800; Referee: Abirami Apbai Naidu (Singapore) |

| 28 August Friendly | Egypt | 2–0 | Jordan | Alexandria, Egypt |
| | | Report | | Stadium: Alexandria Stadium |

| 31 August Friendly | Egypt | 0–2 | Jordan | Alexandria, Egypt |
| | | Report | Al-Nahar 6'; Jebreen 63' | Stadium: Alexandria Stadium |

| 15 September 2014 Asian Games GS | Jordan | 2–2 | Chinese Taipei | Incheon, South Korea |
| 08:00 | Al-Naber 45+7'; Jbarah 49' | | Lin Ya-han 15'; Wang Hsiang-huei 26' | Stadium: Namdong Asiad Rugby Field; Referee: Shiva Yari (Iran) |

| 18 September 2014 Asian Games GS | Japan | 12–0 | Jordan | Incheon, South Korea |
| 14:00 | Kawasumi 5', 81'; Sugasawa 12', 39', 41'; Sakaguchi 20', 32', 71'; Abu-Kasheh 36' (o.g.); Kira 44', 49'; Miyama 60' | | | Stadium: Namdong Asiad Rugby Field, Incheon; Referee: Mai Hoàng Trang (Vietnam) |

| 22 September 2014 Asian Games GS | China | 5–0 | Jordan | Incheon, South Korea |
| 14:00 | Yang Li 10', 13', 26', 42'; Li Dongna 36' | | | Stadium: Namdong Asiad Rugby Field; Referee: Kim Sook-hee (South Korea) |

=== 2015 ===
| 11 March 2016 AFC Olympic Qualifying Tournament | Jordan | 1–0 | Hong Kong | Amman, Jordan |
| 16:00 | Jbarah 8' | Report | | Stadium: Petra Stadium; Attendance: 400; Referee: Fusako Kajiyama (Japan) |

| 13 March 2016 AFC Olympic Qualifying Tournament | Palestine | 0–6 | Jordan | Amman, Jordan |
| | | Report | Jebreen 20'; Jbarah 27', 38', 60'; S. Al-Naber 33', 53' | Stadium: Petra Stadium; Attendance: 500; Referee: Maria Rebello (India) |

| 15 March 2016 AFC Olympic Qualifying Tournament | Uzbekistan | 0–2 | Jordan | Amman, Jordan |
| 16:00 | | Report | S. Al-Naber 76' (pen.); Al-Masri 82' | Stadium: Petra Stadium; Attendance: 800; Referee: Kate Jacewicz (Australia) |

| 24 August Friendly | Jordan | 2–1 | Morocco | Amman, Jordan |
| | S. Al-Naber 7' (pen.); Jbarah 39' | Report | Fadel 76' | Stadium: Petra Stadium |

| 26 August Friendly | Jordan | 2–2 | Morocco | Amman, Jordan |
| | Jbarah 38'; S. Al-Naber 59' (pen.) | Report | Rabbah 11'; Fadel 19' | Stadium: Petra Stadium |

| 14 September 2016 AFC Olympic Qualifying Tournament | Jordan | 0–2 | Myanmar | Mandalay, Myanmar |
| 15:00 | | Report | Khin Moe Wai 17'; Wai Wai Aung 72' | Stadium: Mandalarthiri Stadium; Attendance: 3,894; Referee: Nami Imaizumi (Japan) |

| 16 September 2016 AFC Olympic Qualifying Tournament | Jordan | 0–3 | Chinese Taipei | Mandalay, Myanmar |
| 12:00 | | Report | Chan Pi-han 8'; Michelle Pao 45'; Khair 58' (o.g.) | Stadium: Mandalarthiri Stadium; Attendance: 736; Referee: Saltanat Noroozi (Iran) |

| 18 September 2016 AFC Olympic Qualifying Tournament | Thailand | 1–0 | Jordan | Mandalay, Myanmar |
| 12:00 | Anootsara 30' | Report | | Stadium: Mandalarthiri Stadium; Attendance: 340; Referee: Wang Jia (China) |

| 20 September 2016 AFC Olympic Qualifying Tournament | Vietnam | 2–1 | Jordan | Mandalay, Myanmar |
| 12:00 | Nguyễn Thị Minh Nguyệt 18' (pen.), 45+1' | Report | Jbarah 76' | Stadium: Mandalarthiri Stadium; Attendance: 115; Referee: Nami Imaizumi (Japan) |

| 8 December Friendly – Abu Dhabi Tournament | Jordan | 5–0 | Bahrain | Abu Dhabi, UA Emirates |
| | Sweilem 17'; Jbarah; S. Al-Naber | | | Stadium: Police Officers' Club Stadium |

=== 2017 ===
| 9 February Friendly | Jordan | 2–1 | Algeria | Amman, Jordan |
| 16:00 | Jebreen 36'; Al-Nahar 90+2' | Report | Affak 17' | Stadium: Petra Stadium |

| 12 February Friendly | Jordan | 2–3 | Algeria | Amman, Jordan |
| 16:00 | Jebreen 37'; Al-Nahar 90+2' | Report | Akli 9', 86'; Bouhani 54' | Stadium: Petra Stadium |

| 3 April 2018 AFC Asian Cup qualification | Bahrain | 0–6 | Jordan | Dushanbe, Tajikistan |
| 11:00 | | Report | Jebreen 9'; Jbarah 22', 30', 43'; Al-Naber 86'; Al-Masri 90' | Stadium: Pamir Stadium; Attendance: 40; Referee: Rebecca Durcau (Australia) |

| 5 April 2018 AFC Asian Cup qualification | Jordan | 6–0 | United Arab Emirates | Dushanbe, Tajikistan |
| 17:00 | Jbarah 3', 40', 77', 81'; S. Al-Naber 44', 80' | Report | | Stadium: Pamir Stadium; Attendance: 40; Referee: Yoshimi Yamashita (Japan) |

| 7 April 2018 AFC Asian Cup qualification | Jordan | 10–0 | Iraq | Dushanbe, Tajikistan |
| 17:00 | Jebreen 1'; Al-Masri 20'; S. Al-Naber 27' (pen.), 61' (pen.), 81'; Jbarah 45+5', 65', 79', 84'; Breesam 77' (o.g.) | Report | | Stadium: Pamir Stadium; Attendance: 80; Referee: Mahsa Ghorbani (Iran) |

| 10 April 2018 AFC Asian Cup qualification | Tajikistan | 2–10 | Jordan | Dushanbe, Tajikistan |
| 14:00 | Iskandari 21'; Sotnikova 76' | Report | S. Al-Naber 4' (pen.), 63'; Jebreen 8', 15', 23', 45+3'; Sweilem 34', 45+2'; Al-Kousheh 69'; Al-Nahar 81' | Stadium: Pamir Stadium; Attendance: 120; Referee: Anna Sidorova (Uzbekistan) |

| 12 April 2018 AFC Asian Cup qualification | Jordan | 5–1 | Philippines | Dushanbe, Tajikistan |
| 11:00 | Al-Masri 15', 48'; Jbarah 29', 37'; Al-Naber 67' | Report | Del Campo 90+1' | Stadium: Pamir Stadium; Attendance: 110; Referee: Yoshimi Yamashita (Japan) |

| 16 June Friendly | Jordan | 0–1 | Algeria | Amman, Jordan |
| | | | Bouhani 5' | Stadium: Petra Stadium |

| 19 June Friendly | Jordan | 3–2 | Algeria | Amman, Jordan |
| | Jebreen 68'; Jbarah 78'; Al-Momani 88' | Report | Brahimi 18'; Benlazar 25' | Stadium: Petra Stadium |

| 27 July Friendly | Croatia | 3–0 | Jordan | Zagreb, Croatia |
| | Žigić 10'; Rudelić 13'; Šundov 66' | Report | | Stadium: Stadion Lučko; Referee: Sabina Bolić (Croatia) |

| 31 July Friendly | Bosnia and Herzegovina | 4–2 | Jordan | Zenica, Bosnia and Herzegovina |
| | Nikolić 25', 80'; Kapetanović 58', 83' | Report | Jbarah 43'; Al-Nahar 68' | Stadium: Bosnia and Herzegovina FA Training Centre; Referee: Irfan Peljto (Bosnia and Herzegovina) |

| 3 August Friendly | Bosnia and Herzegovina | 2–2 | Jordan | Zenica, Bosnia and Herzegovina |
| 17:30 | Nikolić 6', 9' | Report | Jbarah 54'; Sweilem 70' | Stadium: Bosnia and Herzegovina FA Training Centre |

| 26 September Friendly | Latvia | 1–2 | Jordan | Riga, Latvia |
| 20:00 | Voitāne 45+1' | Report | Sweilem 10'; Al-Masri 79' | Stadium: Jānis Skredelis' Stadium; Attendance: 243; Referee: Justina Lavrenovaitė (Lithuania) |

| 24 November Friendly | Jordan | 0–2 | Japan | Amman, Jordan |
| 16:00 | | Report | Iwabuchi 27', 30' | Stadium: King Abdullah II Stadium |

| 27 November Friendly | Turkey | 1–2 | Jordan | Istanbul, Turkey |
| | Topçu 38' (pen.) | Report | Jbarah 43'; Jebreen 81' | Stadium: TFF Riva Facility; Referee: Neslihan Muratdağı (Turkey) |

| 9 December Friendly | Thailand | 3–0 | Jordan | Pak Kret, Thailand |
| | Orathai 11'; Silawan 51'; Feras 54' (o.g.) | Report | | Stadium: Thunderdome Stadium |

| 12 December Friendly | Thailand | 1–2 | Jordan | Pak Kret, Thailand |
| 11:00 | Ainon 25' (pen.) | Report | Jbarah 40', 71' | Stadium: Thunderdome Stadium |

=== 2018 ===
| 2 February Friendly | Jordan | 5–0 | Afghanistan | Amman, Jordan |
| 19:00 | Jebreen 6'; Kousheh 18'; Jbarah 40'; Sweilem 73'; Al-Barghouthy 90+1' | Report | | Stadium: Petra Stadium |

| 5 February Friendly | Jordan | 6–0 | Afghanistan | Amman, Jordan |
| 19:00 | Jebreen 13', 36'; Jbarah 37', 52'; Sweilem 70', 90+2' | Report | | Stadium: Petra Stadium |

| 28 February 2018 Turkish Cup GS | Poland | 2–0 | Jordan | Alanya, Turkey |
| 11:00 | Guściora 51'; Wiankowska 65' | | | Attendance: 50; Referee: Andrei Şturmilov (Moldova) |

| 2 March 2018 Turkish Cup GS | Jordan | 1–5 | Mexico | Alanya, Turkey |
| 16:00 | Al-Masri 27' | | Cuéllar 25'; Johnson 63'; Corral 67'; Mayor 73', 83' | Attendance: 70; Referee: Vasile Berladean (Moldova) |

| 4 March 2018 Turkish Cup GS | Jordan | 3–2 | Latvia | Side, Turkey |
| 11:00 | S. Al-Naber 3'; Jbarah 38'; Jebreen 88' | Report | Fjodorova 57'; Giržda 89' | Stadium: Starlight Resort Hotel Football Pitch; Attendance: 100; Referee: Andrei Şturmilov (Moldova) |

| 6 March 2018 Turkish Cup 7th place | Jordan | 1–2 | Romania | Alanya, Turkey |
| 09:00 | Jbarah 53' | | Carp 9'; Voicu 16' | Attendance: 50; Referee: Andrei Şturmilov (Moldova) |

| 24 March Friendly | Jordan | 1–1 | Chinese Taipei | Amman, Jordan |
| | Shathli 25' | Report | Ting Chi 58' | Stadium: Amman International Stadium |

| 6 April 2018 AFC Asian Cup GS | Jordan | 1–2 | Philippines | Amman, Jordan |
| 20:00 | Jbarah 15' | Report | Khair 51' (o.g.); Bolden 76' | Stadium: Amman International Stadium; Attendance: 9,473; Referee: Ri Hyang-ok (North Korea) |

| 9 April 2018 AFC Asian Cup GS | Thailand | 6–1 | Jordan | Amman, Jordan |
| 20:00 | Suchawadee 1', 69'; Taneekarn 6'; Silawan 39'; Kanjana 41'; Pitsamai 90' | Report | Jebreen 43' | Stadium: King Abdullah II Stadium; Attendance: 5,000; Referee: Yoshimi Yamashita (Japan) |

| 12 April 2018 AFC Asian Cup GS | Jordan | 1–8 | China | Amman, Jordan |
| 20:00 | Abu-Sabbah 17' | Report | Wang Shuang 14', 53', 84'; Khair 41' (o.g.); Song Duan 51'; Li Ying 60', 72' (pen.); Tang Jiali 86' | Stadium: Amman International Stadium; Attendance: 4,428; Referee: Công Thị Dung (Vietnam) |

| 8 November 2020 AFC Olympic Qualifying Tournament | Jordan | 6–0 | Maldives | Al-Ram, Palestine |
| 14:30 | Al-Nahar 3'; Jebreen 13'; Al-Sufy 16', 90+2'; Al-Majali 73'; Hina 88' | Report | | Stadium: Faisal Al-Husseini International Stadium; Attendance: 180; Referee: Thein Thein Aye (Myanmar) |

| 11 November 2020 AFC Olympic Qualifying Tournament | Palestine | 0–7 | Jordan | Al-Ram, Palestine |
| 17:30 | | Report | S. Al-Naber 21'; Al-Sufy 26', 67', 81'; Jebreen 78'; Al-Nahar 83'; Abu-Rob 88' | Stadium: Faisal Al-Husseini International Stadium; Attendance: 190; Referee: Qin Liang (China) |

| 13 November 2020 AFC Olympic Qualifying Tournament | Jordan | 3–0 | Indonesia | Al-Ram, Palestine |
| 14:30 | Jebreen 16'; Al-Nahar 74'; Abu Ghosh 87' | Report | | Stadium: Faisal Al-Husseini International Stadium; Attendance: 110; Referee: Thein Thein Aye (Myanmar) |

=== 2019 ===
| 7 January 2019 WAFF Championship | Jordan | 4–1 | United Arab Emirates | Muharraq, Bahrain |
| 13:00 | Al-Adwan 45' (o.g.); Hina 63', 74'; Al-Sufy 79' | Report | Juma 31' | Stadium: Al Muharraq Stadium |

| 11 January 2019 WAFF Championship | Jordan | 3–1 | Lebanon | Muharraq, Bahrain |
| 13:00 | Hina 8'; Al-Sufy 12'; Jebreen 56' | Report | Tamim 58' | Stadium: Al Muharraq Stadium |

| 13 January 2019 WAFF Championship | Palestine | 0–3 | Jordan | Muharraq, Bahrain |
| 16:00 | | Report | Al-Nahar 16'; Hina 36', 83' | Stadium: Al Muharraq Stadium |

| 15 January 2019 WAFF Championship | Jordan | 1–0 | Bahrain | Muharraq, Bahrain |
| 16:00 | S. Al-Naber 67' | Report | | Stadium: Al Muharraq Stadium |

| 27 February 2019 Turkish Cup GS | Jordan | 0–6 | Northern Ireland | Side, Turkey |
| 17:30 | | | Magill 5'; Furness 33', 87', 90'; Hutton 44'; Monters 65' | Stadium: Evrenseki Stadium |

| 1 March 2019 Turkish Cup GS | Kazakhstan | 1–1 | Jordan | Side, Turkey |
| 11:00 | Kulmagambetova 31' (pen.) | | S. Al-Naber 13' | Stadium: Evrenseki Stadium |

| 3 March 2019 Turkish Cup GS | France B | 10–0 | Jordan | Alanya, Turkey |
| 12:00 | Matéo 7', 11', 16'; Rougemont 29'; Lahmari 37'; Khelifi 47'; Corboz 53'; Léger 67'; Laurent 73'; Diallo 82' | Report | | Stadium: Gold City Sport Complex |

| 5 March 2019 Turkish Cup 7th place | Jordan | 3–0 | Turkmenistan | Alanya, Turkey |
| 08:30 | Hina 5'; N. Al-Naber 24', 73' | Report | | Stadium: Gold City Sport Complex |

| 3 April 2020 AFC Olympic Qualifying Tournament | Jordan | 0–0 | Hong Kong | Tashkent, Uzbekistan |
| 13:00 | | Report | | Stadium: Transportation Institute Stadium; Attendance: 50; Referee: Ranjita Devi Tekcham (India) |

| 6 April 2020 AFC Olympic Qualifying Tournament | Uzbekistan | 2–0 | Jordan | Tashkent, Uzbekistan |
| 13:00 | Kudratova 72', 90+2' | Report | | Stadium: Lokomotiv Stadium; Attendance: 220; Referee: Jon Sol-mi (North Korea) |

| 9 April 2020 AFC Olympic Qualifying Tournament | Vietnam | 2–0 | Jordan | Tashkent, Uzbekistan |
| 13:00 | Nguyễn Thị Vạn 65'; Huỳnh Như 67' | Report | | Stadium: Transportation Institute Stadium; Attendance: 30; Referee: Oh Hyeon-jeong (South Korea) |

=== 2021 ===
| 7 April Friendly – Our Game Tournament | Lithuania | 1–0 | Jordan | Charentsavan, Armenia |
| 15:00 | Lazdauskaitė 65' | Report | | Stadium: Charentsavan City Stadium |

| 10 April Friendly – Our Game Tournament | Armenia | 1–1 | Jordan | Charentsavan, Armenia |
| 15:00 | Osipyan 25' | Report | Jbarah 56' | Stadium: Charentsavan City Stadium |

| 12 April Friendly – Our Game Tournament | Lebanon | 0–6 | Jordan | Charentsavan, Armenia |
| 12:00 | | Report | Jbarah 17', 61'; Fraij 20', 48'; Al-Masri 38'; Al-Btoush 72' | Stadium: Charentsavan City Stadium |

| 10 June Friendly | Jordan | 1–2 | Tunisia | Amman, Jordan |
| 18:00 | Jbarah 66' (pen.) | Report | Kaabachi 43' (pen.); Jeddi 86' | Stadium: King Abdullah II Stadium |

| 13 June Friendly | Jordan | 0–2 | Tunisia | Amman, Jordan |
| 18:00 | | Report | Lamti 35'; Hamdi 82' | Stadium: King Abdullah II Stadium |

| 25 August 2021 Arab Cup GS | Jordan | 1–3 | Algeria | Cairo, Egypt |
| 22:00 | Jbarah 45' | Report | Bouhani 34'; Ramdani 65'; Hadjar 71' | Stadium: Egyptian Air Defense Forces Stadium; Referee: Dorsaf Ganouati (Tunisia) |

| 31 August 2021 Arab Cup GS | Palestine | 1–4 | Jordan | Cairo, Egypt |
| 22:00 | Abdrabbo 16' | Report | Jbarah 1', 62'; Al-Majali 45+2'; Al-Masri 46' | Stadium: Egyptian Air Defense Forces Stadium; Referee: Doumouh Al Bakkar (Lebanon) |

| 3 September 2021 Arab Cup SF | Egypt | 2–5 | Jordan | Cairo, Egypt |
| 18:00 | Essam 42'; El-Mitwalli 78' | Report | Jbarah 37', 46'; Jebreen 38'; Fraij 45+4', 67' | Stadium: Osman Ahmed Osman Stadium; Referee: Dorsaf Ganouati (Tunisia) |

| 6 September 2021 Arab Cup F | Jordan | 1–0 | Tunisia | Cairo, Egypt |
| 21:00 | Jbarah 85' | Report | | Stadium: Osman Ahmed Osman Stadium; Referee: Shahenda El Maghrabi (Egyptian Football Association) |

| 19 September 2022 AFC Asian Cup qualification | Bangladesh | 0–5 | Jordan | Tashkent, Uzbekistan |
| 13:00 | | Report | Jebreen 35'; Al-Bitar 45'; Jbarah 62', 67', 77' | Stadium: Milliy Stadium; Attendance: 0 Referee: Oh Hyeon-jeong (South Korea) |

| 25 September 2022 AFC Asian Cup qualification | Jordan | 0–0 (2–4 p) | Iran | Tashkent, Uzbekistan |
| 13:00 | | Report | | Stadium: Milliy Stadium; Attendance: 0 Referee: Ranjita Devi Tekcham (India) |
| | Penalties |
| | Al-Majali (penalty scored); Al-Bitar (penalty missed); Fraij (penalty scored); Al-Masri (penalty missed) | | (penalty scored) Taherkhani; (penalty scored) Motevalli; (penalty scored) Ghanbari; (penalty scored) Sadeghi |

=== 2022 ===
| 8 April Friendly – Tri-Nation Championship | Jordan | 0–1 | India | Zarqa, Jordan |
| 22:30 | | Report | Kalyan 48' | Stadium: Prince Mohammed Stadium |

| 11 April Friendly – Tri-Nation Championship | Jordan | 0–0 | Egypt | Zarqa, Jordan |
| 22:30 | | Report | | Stadium: Prince Mohammed Stadium |

| 28 June Friendly | Romania | 3–1 | Jordan | Bucharest, Romania |
| 20:00 | Herczeg 24', 39' (pen.); Ienovan 45' | Report | Jbarah 45' | Stadium: Stadionul Buftea; Referee: Iuliana Demetrescu (Romania) |

| 29 August 2022 WAFF Championship | Jordan | 4–0 | Syria | Amman, Jordan |
| 21:00 | Jbarah 11', 61', 89'; Al-Bitar 66' | Report | | Stadium: Petra Stadium; Attendance: 500; Referee: Doumouh Al Bakkar (Lebanon) |

| 1 September 2022 WAFF Championship | Lebanon | 1–2 | Jordan | Amman, Jordan |
| 21:00 | Arabi 51' | Report | Al-Bitar 26'; Al-Btoush 66' | Stadium: Petra Stadium; Attendance: 498; Referee: Muath Owfi (Palestine) |

| 4 September 2022 WAFF Championship | Jordan | 4–0 | Palestine | Amman, Jordan |
| 21:00 | Jbarah 23', 59', 73'; Al-Bitar 50' | Report | | Stadium: Petra Stadium; Attendance: 1,000; Referee: Doumouh Al Bakkar (Lebanon) |

| 6 October Friendly | Egypt | 1–0 | Jordan | Cairo, Egypt |
| 20:00 | Mahira Ali 14' | Report | | Stadium: Police Academy Stadium |

| 9 October Friendly | Egypt | 0–1 | Jordan | Cairo, Egypt |
| 21:00 | | Report | Sweilem 88' | Stadium: Police Academy Stadium |

| 12 November Friendly | Turkey | 7–0 | Jordan | Antalya, Turkey |
| 16:00 | Sadıkoğlu 7'; Topçu 29'; Uraz 46', 51'; Keskin 54'; Hançar 80'; Esen 90' | Report | | Stadium: Arslan Zeki Demirci Sports Complex 1 Referee: Mirela Çemeri (Albania) |

| 15 November Friendly | Turkey | 5–0 | Jordan | Antalya, Turkey |
| 16:00 | Uraz 27'; Topçu 33'; Hançar 37'; Cin 55'; Keskin 90' | Report | | Stadium: Arslan Zeki Demirci Sports Complex 1 Referee: Mirela Çemeri (Albania) |

=== 2023 ===
| 19 March Friendly | Jordan | 2–1 | India | Amman, Jordan |
| 16:00 | Jbarah 8'; Al-Jamaeen 13' | Report | Gour 82' | Stadium: Petra Stadium |

| 22 March Friendly | Jordan | 0–0 | India | Amman, Jordan |
| 16:00 | | Report | | Stadium: Petra Stadium |

| 5 April 2024 AFC Olympic Qualifying Tournament | Jordan | 3–1 | Timor-Leste | Tashkent, Uzbekistan |
| 13:00 | Al-Majali 45+3' (pen.); Jbarah 61'; Abu-Sabbah 82' | Report | Dos Reis 90+5' | Stadium: Pakhtakor Stadium; Attendance: 10; Referee: Plong Pich Akara (Cambodia) |

| 8 April 2024 AFC Olympic Qualifying Tournament | Bhutan | 2–1 | Jordan | Tashkent, Uzbekistan |
| 13:00 | N. Dema 64'; Rai 76' | Report | Jbarah 90+2' (pen.) | Stadium: Pakhtakor Stadium; Attendance: 66; Referee: Mahsa Ghorbani (Iran) |

| 11 April 2024 AFC Olympic Qualifying Tournament | Uzbekistan | 7–0 | Jordan | Tashkent, Uzbekistan |
| 15:00 | Zoirova 9'; Ablyakimova 18'; Khabibullaeva 44', 49', 63'; Kudratova 56', 58' | Report | | Stadium: Milliy Stadium; Referee: Azusa Sugino (Japan) |

=== 2024 ===
| 19 February 2024 WAFF Championship GS | Saudi Arabia | 1–3 | Jordan | Jeddah, Saudi Arabia |
| 20:00 | Al-Blehid 34' | Report | Sweilem 25'; Jbarah 62'; Al-Majali 75' (pen.) | Stadium: King Abdullah Sports City Reserve Stadium; Attendance: 900; Referee: Mohamed Juma (Bahrain) |

| 21 February 2024 WAFF Championship GS | Jordan | 3–0 | Guam | Jeddah, Saudi Arabia |
| 17:00 | Jbarah 42', 66'; Pedemonte 80' (o.g.) | Report | | Stadium: King Abdullah Sports City Reserve Stadium; Attendance: 300; Referee: Ahmed Saad (Bahrain) |

| 23 February 2024 WAFF Championship GS | Lebanon | 0–2 | Jordan | Jeddah, Saudi Arabia |
| 17:00 | | Report | Hazem 65'; Feras 81' | Stadium: King Abdullah Sports City Reserve Stadium; Attendance: 500; Referee: Muath Owfi (Palestine) |

| 27 February 2024 WAFF Championship SF | Jordan | 5–0 | Palestine | Jeddah, Saudi Arabia |
| 17:00 | Jbarah 27', 83'; Feras 35'; Abu Sabbah 59'; Al-Jamaeen 87' (pen.) | Report | | Stadium: Prince Abdullah Al-Faisal Sports City; Attendance: 200; Referee: Ahmed Gatea (Iraq) |

| 29 February 2024 WAFF Championship F | Jordan | 2–2 (5–3 p) | Nepal | Jeddah, Saudi Arabia |
| 19:00 | Feras 74'; Abu-Sabbah 89' | Report | Rana Magar 28'; G. Rana 90+2' (pen.) | Stadium: Prince Abdullah Al-Faisal Sports City; Attendance: 4,800; Referee: Mohamed Juma (Bahrain) |
| | Penalties |
| | Al-Majali (penalty scored); Jbarah (penalty scored); Zoqash (penalty scored); Abu-Sabbah (penalty scored); Fraij (penalty scored) | | (penalty scored) G. Rana; (penalty scored) Shahi; (penalty scored) Kumari Bhujel; (penalty missed) Jaisi |

| 23 October Friendly – Pink Ladies Cup | Haiti | 4–2 | Jordan | Antalya, Turkey |
| 19:00 | Ibrahim 20'; A. Pierre-Louis 44'; B. Louis 47'; D. Pierre-Louis 55' | Report | Akroush 31'; Al-Fararjeh 82' | Stadium: Emir Hotels Sports Complex 1 |

| 26 October Friendly – Pink Ladies Cup | Philippines | 3–0 | Jordan | Antalya, Turkey |
| 16:00 | Bolden 2', 68' (pen.); Guillou 77' (pen.) | Report | | Stadium: Emir Hotels Sports Complex 1 |

| 29 October Friendly – Pink Ladies Cup | Chinese Taipei | 3–1 | Jordan | Antalya, Turkey |
| 10:00 | Wu Kai-ching 36'; Su Yu-hsuan 60'; Li Yi-wen 68' | Report | Al-Bitar 29' | Stadium: Emir Hotels Sports Complex 2 |

| 28 November Friendly | Jordan | 0–0 | Iran | Amman, Jordan |
| 17:00 | | Report | | Stadium: Petra Stadium |

| 1 December Friendly | Jordan | 2–1 | Iran | Amman, Jordan |
| 17:00 | Al-Jamaeen 54'; Feras 90+1' | Report | Chatrenoor 78' | Stadium: Petra Stadium |

=== 2025 ===
| 20 February Friendly – Pink Ladies Cup | Jordan | 0–2 | India | Sharjah, UA Emirates |
| 14:00 | | Report | Naorem 23'; Kalyan 54' | Stadium: Al Hamriya Sports Club Stadium |

| 23 February Friendly – Pink Ladies Cup | Jordan | 0–1 | Uzbekistan | Sharjah, UA Emirates |
| 10:00 | | Report | Mamatkulova 86' | Stadium: Al Hamriya Sports Club Stadium |

| 26 February Friendly – Pink Ladies Cup | Russia | 3–0 | Jordan | Sharjah, UA Emirates |
| 18:00 | Mashina 3'; Ishmukhametova 15'; Morozova 57' | Report | | Stadium: Al Hamriya Sports Club Stadium; Referee: Omar Hassan (United Arab Emirates) |

| 4 April Friendly | Egypt | 3–0 | Jordan | Nasr City, Egypt |
| 19:00 | El Behery 45'; Sawan 73'; Ghazi 83' | Report | | Stadium: Al Ahly Secondary Stadium |

| 8 April Friendly | Egypt | 5–1 | Jordan | Cairo, Egypt |
| 19:00 | El Behery 23', 86'; Tarek 30'; Ghazi 76'; El Sayed 90' | Report | Hazem 68' | Stadium: Egyptian Air Defense Stadium |

| 28 May Friendly – Tri-Nation Championship | Jordan | 1–1 | Indonesia | Amman, Jordan |
| 19:00 | F. Abu Tayeh 45+1' | Report | Rumbewas 33' | Stadium: King Abdullah II Stadium |

| 3 June Friendly – Tri-Nation Championship | Jordan | 2–2 | Bangladesh | Amman, Jordan |
| 19:00 | Jbarah 5'; Al-Bitar 58' | Report | Shamsunnahar Jr. 43'; Ripa 81' | Stadium: King Abdullah II Stadium |

| 7 July 2026 AFC Asian Cup qualification | Lebanon | 0–4 | Jordan | Amman, Jordan |
| 19:00 | | Report | Jbarah 8', 20'; Al-Bitar 32'; Abu Tayeh 77' | Stadium: King Abdullah II Stadium; Referee: Rebecca Durcau (Australia) |

| 13 July 2026 AFC Asian Cup qualification | Jordan | 5–0 | Singapore | Amman, Jordan |
| 19:00 | Jbarah 9', 64'; Al-Bitar 43'; Al-Jamaeen 66'; Sweilem 84' | Report | | Stadium: King Abdullah II Stadium; Referee: Plong Pich Akara (Cambodia) |

| 16 July 2026 AFC Asian Cup qualification | Jordan | 3–0 | Bhutan | Amman, Jordan |
| 19:00 | Jbarah 4'; Al-Majali 39' (pen.); Akroush 79' | Report | | Stadium: King Abdullah II Stadium; Referee: Rebecca Durcau (Australia) |

| 19 July 2026 AFC Asian Cup qualification | Iran | 2–1 | Jordan | Amman, Jordan |
| 19:00 | Didar 47'; Zandi 81' | Report | Amineh 88' (o.g.) | Stadium: King Abdullah II Stadium; Referee: Lê Thị Ly (Vietnam) |

| 24 November 2025 WAFF Championship GS | Palestine | 0–3 | Jordan | Jeddah, Saudi Arabia |
| 16:45 | | Report | Sweilem 13'; Feras 35'; N. Phillips 66' (o.g.) | Stadium: Hall Stadium – King Abdullah Sports City; Referee: Doumouh Al-Bakkar (Lebanon) |

| 28 November 2025 WAFF Championship GS | Jordan | 5–0 | Lebanon | Jeddah, Saudi Arabia |
| 16:45 | Sweilem 17'; Tamimi 29'; Al-Fararjeh 37'; Arabi 43' (o.g.); M. Abu Tayeh 54' | Report | | Stadium: Hall Stadium – King Abdullah Sports City, Jeddah; Referee: Rawdha Al-Mansoori (United Arab Emirates) |

| 30 November 2025 WAFF Championship SF | Jordan | 3–0 | Iraq | Jeddah, Saudi Arabia |
| 16:45 | Al-Majali 54'; M. Abu Tayeh 84'; Al-Btoush 90+1' | Report | | Stadium: Hall Stadium – King Abdullah Sports City; Referee: Mohammed Al-Manii (Oman) |

| 2 December 2025 WAFF Championship F | Palestine | 1–3 | Jordan | Jeddah, Saudi Arabia |
| 19:45 | Youssef 85' | Report | Akroush 15'; Al-Majali 30' (pen.); F. Abu Tayeh 64' | Stadium: Prince Abdullah Al-Faisal Sports City Stadium; Referee: Said Al-Mezeini (Oman) |

== See also ==
- Jordan national football team results
- List of Jordan women's international footballers
