= Football at the 2010 Asian Games – Women's team squads =

Below are the squads for the women's football tournament at the 2010 Asian Games, played in Guangzhou, China.

== Group A ==
=== China PR ===
Coach: Li Xiaopeng

| No. | Pos. | Player | Date of birth (age) | Club |
|---|---|---|---|---|
| 1 | GK | Zhang Yanru | 10 January 1987 (aged 23) | (Chinese Football Association) Jiangsu Huatai |
| 2 | DF | Liu Huana | 17 May 1981 (aged 29) | (Chinese Football Association) Shaanxi |
| 3 | DF | Zhou Gaoping | 20 October 1986 (aged 24) | (Chinese Football Association) Jiangsu Huatai |
| 4 | DF | Li Danyang | 8 April 1990 (aged 20) | (Chinese Football Association) Dalian Shide |
| 5 | DF | Yuan Fan | 6 November 1986 (aged 24) | (Chinese Football Association) Shanghai STV |
| 6 | DF | Weng Xinzhi | 15 June 1988 (aged 22) | (Chinese Football Association) Jiangsu Huatai |
| 7 | MF | Sun Ling | 12 November 1985 (aged 25) | (Chinese Football Association) Shanghai STV |
| 8 | FW | Xu Yuan | 17 November 1985 (aged 24) | (Chinese Football Association) Shanghai STV |
| 9 | FW | Ma Jun | 6 March 1989 (aged 21) | (Chinese Football Association) Shanghai STV |
| 10 | FW | Li Lin | 3 April 1988 (aged 22) | (Chinese Football Association) Dalian Shide |
| 11 | MF | Gu Yasha | 28 November 1990 (aged 19) | (Chinese Football Association) Beijing Zhaotai |
| 12 | FW | Wang Yihang | 6 December 1984 (aged 25) | (Chinese Football Association) Jiangsu Huatai |
| 13 | GK | Zhang Yue | 30 September 1990 (aged 20) | (Chinese Football Association) Shanghai STV |
| 14 | MF | Sun Lisha | 1 September 1983 (aged 27) | (Chinese Football Association) Beijing Zhaotai |
| 15 | DF | Yu Yahui | 2 January 1989 (aged 21) | (Chinese Football Association) Shandong Huangming |
| 16 | MF | Zhang Na | 10 March 1984 (aged 26) | (Chinese Football Association) Hebei Yuandong |
| 17 | MF | Pang Fengyue | 19 January 1989 (aged 21) | (Chinese Football Association) Dalian Shide |
| 18 | MF | Qu Shanshan | 18 July 1990 (aged 20) | (Chinese Football Association) Beijing Zhaotai |

=== South Korea ===
Coach: Choi In-cheul

| No. | Pos. | Player | Date of birth (age) | Club |
|---|---|---|---|---|
| 1 | GK | Jun Min-kyung | 16 January 1985 (aged 25) | (Korea Football Association) Goyang Daekyo Noonnoppi |
| 2 | DF | Shim Seo-yeon | 15 April 1989 (aged 21) | (Korea Football Association) Suwon FMC |
| 3 | DF | Lee Eun-mi | 18 August 1988 (aged 22) | (Korea Football Association) Goyang Daekyo Noonnoppi |
| 4 | DF | Kim Do-yeon | 7 December 1988 (aged 21) | (Korea Football Association) Seoul Amazones |
| 5 | DF | Hong Kyung-suk | 14 October 1984 (aged 26) | (Korea Football Association) Goyang Daekyo Noonnoppi |
| 6 | DF | Yu Ji-eun | 27 March 1983 (aged 27) | (Korea Football Association) Goyang Daekyo Noonnoppi |
| 7 | MF | Kwon Hah-nul | 7 March 1988 (aged 22) | (Korea Football Association) Busan Sangmu |
| 8 | MF | Park Eun-jung | 4 November 1986 (aged 24) | (Korea Football Association) Seoul Amazones |
| 9 | FW | Park Hee-young | 11 June 1985 (aged 25) | (Korea Football Association) Goyang Daekyo Noonnoppi |
| 10 | FW | Ji So-yun | 21 February 1991 (aged 19) | (Korea Football Association) Hanyang Women's University |
| 11 | MF | Kim Soo-yun | 30 August 1989 (aged 21) | (Korea Football Association) Chungnam Ilhwa Chunma |
| 12 | GK | Moon So-ri | 12 August 1990 (aged 20) | (Korea Football Association) Ulsan College |
| 14 | FW | Jeon Ga-eul | 14 September 1988 (aged 22) | (Korea Football Association) Suwon FMC |
| 15 | MF | Kwon Eun-som | 13 November 1990 (aged 20) | (Korea Football Association) Ulsan College |
| 16 | MF | Kim Na-rae | 1 June 1990 (aged 20) | (Korea Football Association) Yeoju Institute of Technology |
| 17 | FW | Yoo Young-a | 15 April 1988 (aged 22) | (Korea Football Association) Busan Sangmu |
| 19 | MF | Cha Yun-hee | 26 February 1986 (aged 24) | (Korea Football Association) Goyang Daekyo Noonnoppi |
| 20 | DF | Kim Hye-ri | 25 June 1990 (aged 20) | (Korea Football Association) Yeoju Institute of Technology |

=== Vietnam ===
Coach: (China) Chen Yunfa

| No. | Pos. | Player | Date of birth (age) | Club |
|---|---|---|---|---|
| 1 | GK | Đặng Thị Kiều Trinh | 19 December 1985 (aged 24) | (Vietnam Football Federation) Thành Phố Hồ Chí Minh |
| 3 | DF | Nhiêu Thùy Linh | 7 November 1983 (aged 27) | (Vietnam Football Federation) Than Khoáng Sản Việt Nam |
| 4 | MF | Nguyễn Thị Hạnh | 20 September 1986 (aged 24) | (Vietnam Football Federation) Than Khoáng Sản Việt Nam |
| 5 | DF | Bùi Thị Như | 16 June 1990 (aged 20) | (Vietnam Football Federation) Phong Phú Hà Nam |
| 6 | MF | Nguyễn Thị Kim Tiến | 2 September 1984 (aged 26) | (Vietnam Football Federation) Hà Nội Tràng An I |
| 7 | DF | Nguyễn Thị Nga | 9 May 1985 (aged 25) | (Vietnam Football Federation) Hà Nội Tràng An I |
| 11 | FW | Bùi Thị Phượng | 3 October 1986 (aged 24) | (Vietnam Football Federation) Than Khoáng Sản Việt Nam |
| 12 | MF | Vũ Thị Huyền Linh | 10 April 1987 (aged 23) | (Vietnam Football Federation) Hà Nội Tràng An I |
| 13 | MF | Nguyễn Thị Muôn | 7 October 1988 (aged 22) | (Vietnam Football Federation) Hà Nội Tràng An I |
| 15 | DF | Nguyễn Thị Ngọc Anh | 23 February 1985 (aged 25) | (Vietnam Football Federation) Hà Nội Tràng An I |
| 16 | MF | Lê Thị Thương | 23 December 1984 (aged 25) | (Vietnam Football Federation) Than Khoáng Sản Việt Nam |
| 17 | DF | Nguyễn Hải Hòa | 22 December 1989 (aged 20) | (Vietnam Football Federation) Gang Thép Thái Nguyên |
| 18 | FW | Nguyễn Thị Minh Nguyệt | 16 November 1986 (aged 23) | (Vietnam Football Federation) Hà Nội Tràng An I |
| 22 | FW | Nguyễn Thị Hòa | 27 July 1990 (aged 20) | (Vietnam Football Federation) Hà Nội Tràng An I |
| 23 | DF | Trần Thị Kim Hồng | 26 January 1985 (aged 25) | (Vietnam Football Federation) Thành Phố Hồ Chí Minh |
| 25 | GK | Đỗ Thị Thu Trang | 4 November 1983 (aged 27) | (Vietnam Football Federation) Hà Nội Tràng An I |
| 28 | DF | Nguyễn Thị Mai Ngọc | 15 September 1989 (aged 21) | (Vietnam Football Federation) Hà Nội Tràng An I |
| 29 | DF | Bùi Thúy An | 5 October 1990 (aged 20) | (Vietnam Football Federation) Hà Nội Tràng An I |

=== Jordan ===
Coach: (Netherlands) Hesterine de Reus

| No. | Pos. | Player | Date of birth (age) | Club |
|---|---|---|---|---|
| 1 | GK | Misda Ramounieh | 26 May 1983 (aged 27) | |
| 2 | DF | Farah Al-Badarneh | 8 November 1987 (aged 23) | |
| 4 | MF | Mira Zakaria | 20 June 1988 (aged 22) | |
| 5 | DF | Enshirah Al-Hyasat | 25 November 1991 (aged 18) | |
| 6 | DF | Zaina Petro | 6 April 1989 (aged 21) | |
| 7 | DF | Yasmeen Khair | 27 June 1987 (aged 23) | |
| 8 | FW | Stephanie Al-Naber | 12 July 1987 (aged 23) | |
| 9 | MF | Abeer Al-Nahar | 13 February 1991 (aged 19) | |
| 10 | MF | Farah Al-Azab | 6 August 1989 (aged 21) | |
| 11 | FW | Maysa Jbarah | 20 September 1989 (aged 21) | |
| 13 | MF | Ala'a Abu-Kasheh | 23 April 1989 (aged 21) | |
| 14 | FW | Sama'a Khraisat | 15 August 1991 (aged 19) | |
| 16 | FW | Shahnaz Jebreen | 28 July 1992 (aged 18) | |
| 19 | DF | Ayah Al-Majali | 9 March 1992 (aged 18) | |
| 20 | MF | Shorooq Shathli | 6 January 1987 (aged 23) | |
| 22 | GK | Manal Al-Manasreh | 19 October 1975 (aged 35) | |
| 23 | DF | Ala Al-Qraini | 25 October 1988 (aged 22) | |

== Group B ==
=== Japan ===
Coach: Norio Sasaki

| No. | Pos. | Player | Date of birth (age) | Club |
|---|---|---|---|---|
| 1 | GK | Nozomi Yamago | 16 January 1975 (aged 35) | (Japan Football Association) Urawa Red Diamonds |
| 2 | DF | Azusa Iwashimizu | 14 October 1986 (aged 24) | (Japan Football Association) Nippon TV Beleza |
| 3 | DF | Kyoko Yano | 3 June 1984 (aged 26) | (Japan Football Association) Urawa Red Diamonds |
| 4 | DF | Yukari Kinga | 2 May 1984 (aged 26) | (Japan Football Association) Nippon TV Beleza |
| 5 | DF | Aya Sameshima | 16 June 1987 (aged 23) | (Japan Football Association) TEPCO Mareeze |
| 6 | MF | Mizuho Sakaguchi | 15 October 1987 (aged 23) | (Japan Football Association) Albirex Niigata |
| 7 | MF | Megumi Kamionobe | 15 March 1986 (aged 24) | (Japan Football Association) Albirex Niigata |
| 8 | MF | Aya Miyama | 28 January 1985 (aged 25) | (Japan Football Association) Okayama Yunogo Belle |
| 9 | FW | Ayako Kitamoto | 22 June 1983 (aged 27) | (Japan Football Association) Urawa Red Diamonds |
| 10 | MF | Homare Sawa | 6 September 1978 (aged 32) | (United States Soccer Federation) Washington Freedom |
| 11 | FW | Shinobu Ono | 23 January 1984 (aged 26) | (Japan Football Association) Nippon TV Beleza |
| 12 | GK | Ayumi Kaihori | 4 September 1986 (aged 24) | (Japan Football Association) INAC Kobe Leonessa |
| 13 | DF | Saki Kumagai | 17 October 1990 (aged 20) | (Japan Football Association) Urawa Red Diamonds |
| 14 | FW | Mami Yamaguchi | 13 August 1986 (aged 24) | (Japan Football Association) Nippon TV Beleza |
| 15 | DF | Kana Osafune | 16 October 1989 (aged 21) | (Japan Football Association) TEPCO Mareeze |
| 16 | MF | Nahomi Kawasumi | 23 September 1985 (aged 25) | (Japan Football Association) INAC Kobe Leonessa |
| 17 | MF | Manami Nakano | 30 August 1986 (aged 24) | (Japan Football Association) Okayama Yunogo Belle |
| 18 | FW | Megumi Takase | 10 November 1990 (aged 20) | (Japan Football Association) INAC Kobe Leonessa |

=== North Korea ===
Coach: Kim Kwang-min

| No. | Pos. | Player | Date of birth (age) | Club |
|---|---|---|---|---|
| 1 | GK | Hong Myong-hui | 4 September 1991 (aged 19) | (DPR Korea Football Association) April 25 |
| 2 | MF | Kim Kyong-hwa | 28 March 1986 (aged 24) | (DPR Korea Football Association) April 25 |
| 3 | DF | Choe Yong-sim | 13 October 1990 (aged 20) | (DPR Korea Football Association) Pyongyang |
| 5 | DF | Song Jong-sun | 11 March 1981 (aged 29) | (DPR Korea Football Association) Rimyongsu |
| 6 | DF | Ro Chol-ok | 3 January 1993 (aged 17) | (DPR Korea Football Association) April 25 |
| 7 | MF | Ho Un-byol | 19 January 1992 (aged 18) | (DPR Korea Football Association) April 25 |
| 8 | MF | Jo Yun-mi | 5 January 1987 (aged 23) | (DPR Korea Football Association) April 25 |
| 9 | MF | Ri Ye-gyong | 26 October 1989 (aged 21) | (DPR Korea Football Association) Amnokgang |
| 10 | FW | Kim Yong-ae | 7 March 1983 (aged 27) | (DPR Korea Football Association) April 25 |
| 11 | FW | Ra Un-sim | 2 July 1988 (aged 22) | (DPR Korea Football Association) Amnokgang |
| 12 | MF | Ri Un-gyong | 19 November 1990 (aged 19) | (DPR Korea Football Association) Wolmido |
| 13 | MF | Kim Chung-sim | 27 November 1990 (aged 19) | (DPR Korea Football Association) April 25 |
| 15 | FW | Yun Hyon-hi | 9 September 1992 (aged 18) | (DPR Korea Football Association) April 25 |
| 16 | DF | Yu Jong-hui | 21 March 1986 (aged 24) | (DPR Korea Football Association) April 25 |
| 17 | MF | Jon Myong-hwa | 9 August 1993 (aged 17) | (DPR Korea Football Association) April 25 |
| 18 | GK | Jo Yun-mi | 22 May 1989 (aged 21) | (DPR Korea Football Association) April 25 |
| 19 | DF | Jong Pok-sim | 31 July 1985 (aged 25) | (DPR Korea Football Association) April 25 |
| 20 | DF | Kong Hye-ok | 19 July 1983 (aged 27) | (DPR Korea Football Association) April 25 |

=== Thailand ===
Coach: Jatuporn Pramualban

| No. | Pos. | Player | Date of birth (age) | Club |
|---|---|---|---|---|
| 1 | GK | Waraporn Boonsing | 16 February 1990 (aged 20) | (Football Association of Thailand) CAS Khon Kaen |
| 2 | DF | Darut Changplook | 3 February 1988 (aged 22) | (Football Association of Thailand) North Bangkok University |
| 3 | DF | Thidarat Wiwasukhu | 18 February 1985 (aged 25) | (Football Association of Thailand) Rattana Bundit |
| 4 | DF | Duangnapa Sritala | 4 February 1986 (aged 24) | (Football Association of Thailand) Rattana Bundit |
| 6 | DF | Pikul Khueanpet | 20 September 1988 (aged 22) | (Football Association of Thailand) CAS Khon Kaen |
| 7 | MF | Wajee Kertsombun | 2 April 1988 (aged 22) | (Football Association of Thailand) Rattana Bundit |
| 8 | MF | Junpen Seesraum | 11 May 1987 (aged 23) | (Football Association of Thailand) Rattana Bundit |
| 10 | DF | Sunisa Srangthaisong | 6 May 1988 (aged 22) | (Football Association of Thailand) CAS Khon Kaen |
| 11 | MF | Kanjana Sungngoen | 21 September 1986 (aged 24) | (Football Association of Thailand) Rattana Bundit |
| 12 | MF | Chidtawan Chawong | 19 June 1989 (aged 21) | (Football Association of Thailand) CAS Khon Kaen |
| 13 | FW | Pitsamai Sornsai | 19 January 1989 (aged 21) | (Football Association of Thailand) Rattana Bundit |
| 15 | MF | Waranya Chaikantree | 5 December 1987 (aged 22) | (Football Association of Thailand) North Chiang Mai |
| 16 | DF | Supaporn Gaewbaen | 4 March 1985 (aged 25) | (Football Association of Thailand) CAS Khon Kaen |
| 17 | MF | Anootsara Maijarern | 14 February 1986 (aged 24) | (Football Association of Thailand) Rattana Bundit |
| 18 | GK | Kanyawee Sudtavee | 11 May 1986 (aged 24) | (Football Association of Thailand) CAS Khon Kaen |
| 19 | MF | Treeratchada Boonpload | 19 February 1989 (aged 21) | (Football Association of Thailand) Rattana Bundit |
| 20 | MF | Wilaiporn Boothduang | 25 June 1987 (aged 23) | (Football Association of Thailand) Rattana Bundit |
| 23 | FW | Nisa Romyen | 18 January 1990 (aged 20) | (Football Association of Thailand) Rattana Bundit |
