= Football at the 2012 Summer Olympics – Women's Asian Qualifiers =

The Asian Football Confederation's pre-Olympic tournament was contested by eighteen teams that competed for the two allocated spots for the 2012 Summer Olympics football tournament in London. However, Qatar withdrew before playing any match. The competition was originally scheduled for February 2010 but it eventually started in March 2011.

== Format ==
The format was as follows:

First round
The highest-ranked 5 teams in the previous tournament (Australia, China, Japan, North Korea and South Korea) received byes to the final round. Other 12 teams were divided into 3 groups by their geographical positions, where each group consisted of a one-round league (round-robin) tournament at a centralized venue. Five teams (the winners and the runners-up of Group A and C, respectively, and the winners of Group B) advanced to the second round.
Second round
5 teams that advanced from the first round played a one-round league (round-robin) tournament at a centralized venue. The winner advanced to the final round.
Final round
6 teams (5 teams with the byes and 1 team from the second round) played a one-round league (round-robin) tournament at a centralized venue. The winners and runners-up qualified for the Football tournament in the 2012.

== First round ==
=== Group A ===
All matches were held in Kaohsiung, Taiwan (Chinese Taipei).

Pos	Team	Pld	W	D	L	GF	GA	GD	Pts	Qualification
1	Vietnam	4	3	1	0	9	2	+7	10	Advance to second round
2	Thailand	4	3	0	1	10	2	+8	9	Advance to second round
3	Chinese Taipei (H)	4	1	2	1	7	5	+2	5	
4	Myanmar	4	1	1	2	2	5	−3	4	
5	Hong Kong	4	0	0	4	0	14	−14	0	

Source: AFC
(H) Hosts
18 March 2011
16:30 UTC+8

Vietnam	4–0	Hong Kong
Vũ Thị Huyền Linh 13'; Nguyễn Thị Muôn 43', 45'; Nguyễn Kim Tiến 78'	Report

Kaohsiung National Stadium, Kaohsiung
Attendance: 157
Referee: Maria Rebello (India)
18 March 2011
19:00 UTC+8

Myanmar	1–1	Chinese Taipei
Khin Marlar Tun 55'	Report	Yu Hsiu-Chin 47'

Kaohsiung National Stadium, Kaohsiung
Attendance: 756
Referee: Ri Hyang-ok (North Korea)

20 March 2011
19:00 UTC+8

Chinese Taipei	0–3	Thailand
	Report	Anutsara 24'; Sunisa 54'; Chidtawan 84'

Kaohsiung National Stadium, Kaohsiung
Attendance: 734
Referee: Cha Sung-mi (South Korea)
20 March 2011
16:30 UTC+8

Myanmar	0–2	Vietnam
	Report	Nguyễn Thị Muôn 73' (pen.); Trần Thị Kim Hồng 75'

Kaohsiung National Stadium, Kaohsiung
Attendance: 550
Referee: Yamaghishi Sachiko (Japan)

22 March 2011
16:30 UTC+8

Thailand	2–0	Myanmar
Chidtawan 38'; Pitsamai 71'	Report

Kaohsiung National Stadium, Kaohsiung
Attendance: 75
Referee: Qin Liang (China PR)
22 March 2011
19:00 UTC+8

Hong Kong	0–5	Chinese Taipei
	Report	Lee Hsiu-Chin 7'; Chen Ying-Hui 65'; Wang Hsiang-Huei 80' (pen.), 84'; Yu Hsiu-Chin 89'

Kaohsiung National Stadium, Kaohsiung
Attendance: 437
Referee: Maria Rebello (India)

25 March 2011
16:30 UTC+8

Hong Kong	0–1	Myanmar
	Report	He Ying 76' (o.g.)

Kaohsiung National Stadium, Kaohsiung
Attendance: 47
Referee: Ri Hyang-ok (North Korea)
25 March 2011
19:00 UTC+8

Vietnam	2–1	Thailand
Nguyễn Thị Hòa 53'; Lê Thu Thanh Hương 90+2'	Report	Chidtawan 1'

Kaohsiung National Stadium, Kaohsiung
Attendance: 133
Referee: Yamagishi Sachiko (Japan)

27 March 2011
16:30 UTC+8

Thailand	4–0	Hong Kong
Sunisa 19'; Chidtawan 48', 50'; Pitsamai 64'	Report

Kaohsiung National Stadium, Kaohsiung
Attendance: 207
Referee: Qin Liang (China PR)
27 March 2011
19:00 UTC+8

Chinese Taipei	1–1	Vietnam
Tsai Li-Chen 77'	Report	Nguyễn Thị Hòa 19'

Kaohsiung National Stadium, Kaohsiung
Attendance: 1,047
Referee: Cha Sung-mi (South Korea)

=== Group B ===
All matches were held in Dhaka, Bangladesh.

Pos	Team	Pld	W	D	L	GF	GA	GD	Pts	Qualification
1	Uzbekistan	2	1	1	0	4	1	+3	4 (Note: As India and Uzbekistan were tied on points, goal difference and goals scored, the group winner was decided by a play-off match, which Uzbekistan won 5–1.)	Advance to second round
2	India	2	1	1	0	4	1	+3	4	
3	Bangladesh (H)	2	0	0	2	0	6	−6	0	

Source: AFC
(H) Hosts
Notes:
18 March 2011
16:30 UTC+6

Bangladesh	0–3	India
	Report	Bala Devi 52', 70', 90+2'

Bangabandhu National Stadium, Motijheel
Attendance: 1,000
Referee: Semaksuk Praew (Thailand)

20 March 2011
16:30 UTC+6

Uzbekistan	3–0	Bangladesh
Ermatova 64'; Sarikova 74'; Karachik 89'	Report

Bangabandhu National Stadium, Motijheel
Attendance: 800
Referee: Mai Hoang Trang (Vietnam)

22 March 2011
16:30 UTC+6

India	1–1	Uzbekistan
Tababi Devi 69'	Report	Riskieva 77'

Bangabandhu National Stadium, Motijheel
Attendance: 1,000
Referee: Pannipar Kamnueng (Thailand)

Play-off match

- Since both India and Uzbekistan were tied on points and goal difference, a play-off match was played to decide the winner of the group:
23 March 2011
7:00 UTC+6

India	1–5	Uzbekistan
Bembem Devi 41'	Report	Lagutkina 57', 60'; Karachik 72'; Turdiboeva 75'; Sarikova 77'

B. S. Mohammad Mostafa Stadium, Dhaka
Attendance: 100
Referee: Semaksuk Praew (Thailand)

=== Group C ===
All matches were held in Zarqa, Jordan.

Pos	Team	Pld	W	D	L	GF	GA	GD	Pts	Qualification
1	Iran	3	2	1	0	7	1	+6	7	Advance to second round
2	Jordan (H)	3	1	2	0	8	2	+6	5	Advance to second round
3	Bahrain	3	0	2	1	2	4	−2	2	
4	Palestine	3	0	1	2	1	11	−10	1	

Source: AFC
(H) Hosts
8 March 2011
13:30 UTC+2

Palestine	0–4	Iran
	Report	Rahimi 3', 13', 55'; Karimi 31'

Prince Mohammed Stadium, Zarqa
Attendance: 60
Referee: Abirami Apbai Naidu (Singapore)
8 March 2011
18:00 UTC+2

Jordan	1–1	Bahrain
S. Khraisat 34'	Report	Alhashimi 2'

Prince Mohammed Stadium, Zarqa
Attendance: 160
Referee: Nami Sato (Japan)

10 March 2011
18:00 UTC+2

Iran	1–1	Jordan
Hatamnejad 55'	Report	Jbarah 24'

Prince Mohammed Stadium, Zarqa
Attendance: 200
Referee: Kim Sook-hee (South Korea)
10 March 2011
13:30 UTC+2

Palestine	1–1	Bahrain
N. Owda 17'	Report	Yaaqob 20'

Prince Mohammed Stadium, Zarqa
Attendance: 50
Referee: Ri Hong-sil (North Korea)

12 March 2011
18:00 UTC+2

Jordan	6–0	Palestine
Jbarah 3', 32'; Al-Naber 6'; Al-Azab 21', 51'; Al-Hyasat 90+2'	Report

Prince Mohammed Stadium, Zarqa
Attendance: 200
Referee: Kim Sook-hee (South Korea)
12 March 2011
13:30 UTC+2

Bahrain	0–2	Iran
	Report	Rahimi 8', 70'

Prince Mohammed Stadium, Zarqa
Attendance: 60
Referee: Nami Sato (Japan)

== Second round ==
All matches were held in Amman, Jordan.

Pos	Team	Pld	W	D	L	GF	GA	GD	Pts	Qualification
1	Thailand	4	3	1	0	18	4	+14	10	Advance to final round
2	Uzbekistan	4	3	0	1	9	6	+3	9	
3	Vietnam	4	2	1	1	8	5	+3	7	
4	Jordan (H)	4	1	0	3	3	11	−8	3	
5	Iran	4	0	0	4	0	12	−12	0	Withdrew (Note: The Iranian government refused to allow its female players to remove the hijab when playing, in violation of FIFA policy; Jordan, Vietnam, Thailand and Uzbekistan were awarded the respective matches 3–0.)

Source: AFC
(H) Hosts
Notes:
3 June 2011
16:00 UTC+2

Uzbekistan	1–5	Thailand
Sarikova 5'	Report	Pitsamai 14', 45'; Kanjana 26'; Nisa 34', 71'

Amman International Stadium, Amman
Attendance: 100
Referee: Wang Jia (China PR)

5 June 2011
19:00 UTC+2

Jordan	0–3	Uzbekistan
	Report	Turdiboeva 76'; Sarikova 78', 81'

King Abdullah Stadium, Amman
Attendance: 500
Referee: Kim Sook-hee (South Korea)

7 June 2011
19:00 UTC+2

Vietnam	1–0	Jordan
Nguyễn Thị Hòa 67'	Report

Amman International Stadium, Amman
Attendance: 400
Referee: Rita Gani (Malaysia)

10 June 2011
16:00 UTC+2

Uzbekistan	2–1	Vietnam
Sarikova 36', 69'	Report	Nguyễn Thị Muôn 90+4'

Amman International Stadium, Amman
Attendance: 200
Referee: Abirami Naidu (Singapore)
10 June 2011
19:00 UTC+2

Thailand	7–0	Jordan
Wilaiporn 19'; Nuengruethai 33'; Junpen 36'; Pitsamai 40'; Taneekarn 49'; Nisa 64', 75'	Report

Amman International Stadium, Amman
Attendance: 400
Referee: Wang Jia (China PR)

12 June 2011
19:00 UTC+2

Vietnam	3–3	Thailand
Lê Thị Thương 8'; Nguyễn Thị Muôn 12'; Lê Thu Thanh Hương 37'	Report	Nguyễn Hải Hòa 18' (o.g.); Kanjana 25'; Wilaiporn 84'

King Abdullah Stadium, Amman
Attendance: 200
Referee: Yamagishi Sachiko (Japan)

== Final round ==
All matches were held in Jinan, Shandong, China.

Pos	Team	Pld	W	D	L	GF	GA	GD	Pts	Qualification
1	Japan	5	4	1	0	8	2	+6	13	Qualification to 2012 Summer Olympics
2	North Korea	5	3	2	0	10	3	+7	11	Qualification to 2012 Summer Olympics
3	Australia	5	3	0	2	8	4	+4	9	
4	China (H)	5	1	2	2	2	2	0	5	
5	South Korea	5	1	1	3	7	7	0	4	
6	Thailand	5	0	0	5	1	18	−17	0	

Source: AFC
(H) Hosts
1 September 2011
15:30 UTC+8

Japan	3–0	Thailand
Kawasumi 61'; Tanaka 75'; Kunupatham 90' (o.g.)	Report

Shandong Provincial Stadium, Jinan
Attendance: 1,231
Referee: Mai Hoàng Trang (Vietnam)
1 September 2011
15:30 UTC+8

North Korea	1–0	Australia
Kim Su-gyong 10'	Report

Jinan Olympic Sports Center, Jinan
Attendance: 800
Referee: Kirsi Heikkinen (Finland)
1 September 2011
19:00 UTC+8

China	0–0	South Korea
	Report

Jinan Olympic Sports Center, Jinan
Attendance: 8,000
Referee: Teodora Albon (Romania)

3 September 2011
15:30 UTC+8

Australia	5–1	Thailand
Simon 13'; Heyman 15', 34'; Butt 45' van Egmond 58'	Report	Taneekarn 59'

Jinan Olympic Sports Center, Jinan
Attendance: 200
Referee: Silvia Tea Spinelli (Italy)
3 September 2011
19:00 UTC+8

China	0–0	North Korea
	Report

Shandong Provincial Stadium, Jinan
Attendance: 10,000
Referee: Kateryna Monzul (Ukraine)
3 September 2011
19:00 UTC+8

South Korea	1–2	Japan
Ji So-yun 30'	Report	Sakaguchi 10'; Ohno 45+1'

Jinan Olympic Sports Center, Jinan
Attendance: 1,172
Referee: Christina W. Pedersen (Norway)

5 September 2011
15:30 UTC+8

South Korea	2–3	North Korea
Lee Hyun-young 5'; Jo Yun-mi 62' (o.g.)	Report	Ra Un-sim 9'; Choe Mi-gyong 28'; Hwang Song-mi 57'

Jinan Olympic Sports Center, Jinan
Attendance: 417
Referee: Teodora Albon (Romania)
5 September 2011
15:30 UTC+8

Japan	1–0	Australia
Kawasumi 62'	Report

Shandong Provincial Stadium, Jinan
Attendance: 1,000
Referee: Efthalia Mitsi (Greece)
5 September 2011
19:00 UTC+8

Thailand	0–2	China
	Report	You Jia 40'; Xu Yuan 80'

Shandong Provincial Stadium, Jinan
Attendance: 7,160
Referee: Mai Hoàng Trang (Vietnam)

8 September 2011
15:30 UTC+8

Thailand	0–3	South Korea
	Report	Jung Seol-bin 10'; Yoo Young-a 56'; Lee Hyun-young 82'

Jinan Olympic Sports Center, Jinan
Attendance: 771
Referee: Kateryna Monzul (Ukraine)
8 September 2011
15:30 UTC+8

North Korea	1–1	Japan
Kim Jo-ran 90+2'	Report	Kim Nam-hui 83' (o.g.)

Shandong Provincial Stadium, Jinan
Attendance: 1,274
Referee: Christina W. Pedersen (Norway)
8 September 2011
19:00 UTC+8

Australia	1–0	China
van Egmond 61'	Report

Jinan Olympic Sports Center, Jinan
Attendance: 10,167
Referee: Kirsi Heikkinen (Finland)

11 September 2011
15:30 UTC+8

Thailand	0–5	North Korea
	Report	Choe Mi-gyong 30'; Yun Song-mi 35'; Ra Un-sim 50', 70'; Kim Un-hwa 56'

Jinan Olympic Sports Center, Jinan
Attendance: 555
Referee: Mai Hoàng Trang (Vietnam)
11 September 2011
15:30 UTC+8

South Korea	1–2	Australia
Kwon Hah-nul 27'	Report	De Vanna 62'; Butt 76'

Shandong Provincial Stadium, Jinan
Attendance: 765
Referee: Efthalia Mitsi (Greece)
11 September 2011
19:00 UTC+8

Japan	1–0	China
Tanaka 57'	Report

Jinan Olympic Sports Center, Jinan
Attendance: 7,890
Referee: Silvia Tea Spinelli (Italy)

== See also ==
- Football at the 2012 Summer Olympics – Women's tournament
- Football at the 2012 Summer Olympics – Men's Asian Qualifiers
