= 2005 WAFF Women's Championship =

1st edition of the WAFF Women's Championship

Tournament details
- Host country: Jordan
- Dates: 23 September – 1 October
- Teams: 5 (from 1 sub-confederation)
- Venue: 1 (in 1 host city)

Final positions
- Champions: Jordan (1st title)
- Runners-up: Iran
- Third place: Syria
- Fourth place: Bahrain

Tournament statistics
- Matches played: 10
- Goals scored: 55 (5.5 per match)
- Top scorer(s): (Jordan) Maysa Jbarah (9 goals)
- Best player: (Jordan) Stephanie Al-Naber

The 2005 WAFF Women's Championship took place in Amman, Jordan. It was the first West Asian Football Federation Women's championship. Five teams participated and the hosts won.

== Results ==
Team	Pts	Pld	W	D	L	GF	GA	GD
Jordan	12	4	4	0	0	26	1	+25
Iran	9	4	3	0	1	20	2	+18
Syria	6	4	2	0	2	6	12	−6
Bahrain	1	4	0	1	3	2	19	−17
Palestine	1	4	0	1	3	1	21	−20

23 September 2005

Iran	5 – 0	Syria
Nafazl 22'; Karimi 28', 55'; Ahmed 48'; Zarei 65'	Report

Amman International Stadium
23 September 2005

Jordan	9 – 0	Palestine
Jbarah 17', 19', 30', 74'; Zakaria 21'; Khraisat 28', 35'; Al-Naber 49'; Al-Azab 53'	Report

Amman International Stadium

25 September 2005

Palestine	0 – 4	Syria

Amman International Stadium
25 September 2005

Jordan	9 – 0	Bahrain
Al-Naber 10', 26', 70'; Jbarah 18', 39', 67'; Khraisat 38'; Al-Azab 49'; Al-Roos 65'

Amman International Stadium

27 September 2005

Bahrain	0 – 7	Iran

Amman International Stadium
27 September 2005

Syria	0 – 6	Jordan
		Al-Azab 10', 15'; Maysa Jbarah 30'; Khair 35', 60'; Al-Naber 70'

Amman International Stadium

29 September 2005

Syria	2 – 1	Bahrain

Amman International Stadium
29 September 2005

Palestine	0 – 7	Iran

Amman International Stadium

1 October 2005

Bahrain	1 – 1	Palestine
Al-Hashmi ??'	Report	Najm ??'

Amman International Stadium
1 October 2005

Iran	1 – 2	Jordan
13'	Report	5'; 65'

Amman International Stadium

2005 West Asian Football Federation Women's champions

Jordan
First title
