= 2010 WAFF Women's Championship =

3rd edition of the WAFF Women's Championship

Tournament details
- Host country: United Arab Emirates
- Dates: 20–28 February
- Teams: 6 (from 1 sub-confederation)
- Venue: 1 (in 1 host city)

Final positions
- Champions: United Arab Emirates (1st title)
- Runners-up: Jordan
- Third place: Bahrain
- Fourth place: Palestine

Tournament statistics
- Matches played: 10
- Goals scored: 58 (5.8 per match)

The 2010 WAFF Women's Championship tournament was held from 20 to 28 February 2010 in Abu Dhabi, United Arab Emirates. It was the third edition of the WAFF Women's Championship. The hosts won after defeating the defending champions, Jordan.

The tournament was won by the United Arab Emirates.

== Participating teams ==
- Kuwait
- Jordan
- Iran (Malavan F.C.)
- Palestine
- United Arab Emirates (host nation)
- Bahrain

== Group stage ==
=== Group A ===
Team	Pld	W	D	L	GF	GA	GD	Pts
Jordan	2	2	0	0	8	1	+7	6
Bahrain	2	1	0	1	2	4	−2	3
Iran (Malavan F.C.)	2	0	0	2	0	5	−5	0

February 20, 2010

Jordan	4 – 1	Bahrain

February 22, 2010

Bahrain	1 – 0	Iran (Malavan F.C.)

February 24, 2010

Iran (Malavan F.C.)	0 – 4	Jordan
		Al-Naber 40' (pen.); Jebreen 45'; Khair 70'; Al-Azab 85' (pen.)

=== Group B ===
Team	Pld	W	D	L	GF	GA	GD	Pts
United Arab Emirates	2	2	0	0	11	2	+9	6
Palestine	2	1	0	1	19	4	+15	3
Kuwait	2	0	0	2	0	24	−24	0

February 20, 2010

United Arab Emirates	4 – 2	Palestine

February 22, 2010

Palestine	17 – 0	Kuwait

February 24, 2010

Kuwait	0 – 7	United Arab Emirates

== Knockout stage ==
=== Semi-finals ===
February 26, 2010

Jordan	10 – 0	Palestine
Jebreen 13'; Al-Azab 28', 49', 62'; Jbarah 42', 55'; Betro 65', 73'; Khraisat 71'; Al-Naber 90+2'

February 26, 2010

United Arab Emirates	4 – 0	Bahrain

=== Third-place match ===
February 28, 2010

Bahrain	3–0	Palestine
Al Hashmi 43'; Al Daisi 44'; Al Khalifa 84'	Report

=== Final match ===
February 28, 2010

Jordan	0–1	United Arab Emirates
	Report	Mubrak 47'
