= Football at the 2012 Summer Olympics – Women's qualification =

Twelve teams competed in the women's football tournament at the 2012 Summer Olympics. In addition to the United Kingdom, the host nation, 11 women's national teams qualified from six separate continental confederations.

== Table ==
Means of qualification	Date of completion	Venue^{1}	Berths	Qualified
Host nation	2005	none	1	Great Britain
AFC Preliminary Competition	11 September 2011	China	2	Japan; North Korea
CAF Preliminary Competition	22 October 2011	multiple	2	Cameroon; South Africa
CONCACAF Preliminary Competition	29 January 2012	Canada	2	United States; Canada
CONMEBOL Preliminary Competition	21 November 2010	Ecuador	2	Brazil; Colombia
OFC Preliminary Competition	4 April 2012	multiple	1	New Zealand
Best UEFA teams in 2011 FIFA Women's World Cup	17 July 2011	Germany	2	Sweden; France
Total			12	

- ^1Locations are those of final tournaments, various qualification stages may precede matches at these specific venues.

== AFC ==
Japan and North Korea earned Olympic qualification places by finishing in the top two of the final round.

=== First round ===
Group A

Pos	Team	Pld	Pts
1	Vietnam	4	10
2	Thailand	4	9
3	Chinese Taipei (H)	4	5
4	Myanmar	4	4
5	Hong Kong	4	0

Source: AFC
(H) Hosts
Group B

Pos	Team	Pld	Pts
1	Uzbekistan	2	4
2	India	2	4
3	Bangladesh (H)	2	0

Source: AFC
(H) Hosts
Group C

Pos	Team	Pld	Pts
1	Iran	3	7
2	Jordan (H)	3	5
3	Bahrain	3	2
4	Palestine	3	1

Source: AFC
(H) Hosts

=== Second round ===
Pos	Team	Pld	Pts
1	Thailand	4	10
2	Uzbekistan	4	9
3	Vietnam	4	7
4	Jordan (H)	4	3
5	Iran	4	0

Source: AFC
(H) Hosts

=== Final round ===
Pos	Team	Pld	Pts
1	Japan	5	13
2	North Korea	5	11
3	Australia	5	9
4	China (H)	5	5
5	South Korea	5	4
6	Thailand	5	0

Source: AFC
(H) Hosts

== CAF ==
Cameroon and South Africa earned Olympic qualification places by winning their final round ties.

=== First round ===
Team 1	Agg.	Team 2	1st leg	2nd leg
Botswana	2–6	Zambia	1–4	1–2

=== Second round ===
Team 1	Agg.	Team 2	1st leg	2nd leg
Gabon	w/o	Equatorial Guinea		
Angola	2–2 (a)	Namibia	2–2	0–0
Congo	w/o	Nigeria		
Cameroon	6–0	Mali	5–0	1–0
Guinea	1–7	Ghana	1–2	0–5
DR Congo	0–3	Ethiopia	0–0	0–3
Morocco	1–3	Tunisia	0–3	1–0
Zambia	1–5	South Africa	1–2	0–3

=== Third round ===
Team 1	Agg.	Team 2	1st leg	2nd leg
Ethiopia	2–2 (a)	Ghana	1–0	1–2
Cameroon	0–2^{1}	Equatorial Guinea	0–0	0–2
Nigeria	9–0	Namibia	7–0	2–0
South Africa	1–1 (6–5 p)	Tunisia	1–0	0–1

2 April 2011
15:30 UTC+1

Cameroon	0–0	Equatorial Guinea
	Report

Ahmadou Ahidjo Stadium, Yaoundé, Cameroon
Attendance: 5,000
Referee: Kankou Coulibaly (Mali)
17 April 2011

Equatorial Guinea	2–0	Cameroon
Añonma 12'; Jade 58'

^{1} Equatorial Guinea were ejected from the competition for fielding an ineligible player, Jade Boho; Cameroon were advanced to the final round.

=== Final round ===
Team 1	Agg.	Team 2	1st leg	2nd leg
Nigeria	3–3 (3–4 p)	Cameroon	2–1	1–2
South Africa	4–1	Ethiopia	3–0	1–1

== CONCACAF ==
The United States and Canada earned Olympic qualification places by winning their semi-final matches.

=== Preliminary round ===
==== Caribbean Zone ====
Group A

Pos	Team	Pld	Pts
1	Haiti	3	7
2	Cuba	3	7
3	Suriname	3	3
4	Aruba (H)	3	0

Source: CONCACAF
(H) Hosts
Group B

Pos	Team	Pld	Pts
1	Dominican Republic (H)	3	9
2	Trinidad and Tobago	3	6
3	Bermuda	3	3
4	Dominica	3	0

Source: CONCACAF
(H) Hosts

Ranking of second-placed teams

Pos	Team	Pld	Pts
1	Cuba	3	7
2	Trinidad and Tobago	3	6

Source: CONCACAF

==== Central American Zone ====
Pos	Team	Pld	Pts
1	Costa Rica	4	12
2	Guatemala (H)	4	9
3	El Salvador	4	6
4	Honduras	4	3
5	Nicaragua	4	0

Source: CONCACAF
(H) Hosts

=== Group stage ===
Group A

Pos	Team	Pld	Pts
1	Canada (H)	3	9
2	Costa Rica	3	6
3	Haiti	3	3
4	Cuba	3	0

Source: CONCACAF
(H) Hosts
Group B

Pos	Team	Pld	Pts
1	United States	3	9
2	Mexico	3	6
3	Guatemala	3	3
4	Dominican Republic	3	0

Source: CONCACAF

=== Knockout stage ===
Semi-finals
January 27 – Vancouver
Canada	3
Mexico	1
January 27 – Vancouver
United States	3
Costa Rica	0

Final
January 29 – Vancouver
Canada	0
United States	4

== CONMEBOL ==
Brazil and Colombia earned Olympic qualification places by finishing in the top two of the second round of the South American Women's Football Championship.

=== First stage ===
Group A

Pos	Team	Pld	Pts
1	Chile	4	9
2	Argentina	4	9
3	Ecuador (H)	4	9
4	Bolivia	4	3
5	Peru	4	0

Source: CONMEBOL
(H) Hosts
Group B

Pos	Team	Pld	Pts
1	Brazil	4	12
2	Colombia	4	9
3	Paraguay	4	6
4	Venezuela	4	3
5	Uruguay	4	0

Source: CONMEBOL

=== Second stage ===
Pos	Team	Pld	Pts
1	Brazil	3	9
2	Colombia	3	4
3	Chile	3	2
4	Argentina	3	1

Source: CONMEBOL

== OFC ==
New Zealand earned an Olympic qualification place by winning their final round tie.

=== First stage ===
==== Round-robin ====
Pos	Team	Pld	Pts
1	Papua New Guinea	3	9
2	Tonga (H)	3	6
3	Samoa	3	3
4	Vanuatu	3	0

Source: OFC
(H) Hosts

==== Knockout round ====
Final
7 March 2012 – Nukuʻalofa
Papua New Guinea	2
Tonga	0
Third place play-off
7 March 2012 – Nukuʻalofa
Samoa	0
Vanuatu	2

=== Final stage ===
Team 1	Agg.	Team 2	1st leg	2nd leg
New Zealand	15–0	Papua New Guinea	8–0	7–0

== UEFA ==
France and Sweden earned Olympic qualification places by finishing as the best UEFA teams in the 2011 FIFA Women's World Cup.
