= Lê Thu Thanh Hương =

Vietnamese footballer

Personal information
- Date of birth: 21 September 1991 (age 35)
- Place of birth: Duy Tiên, Hà Nam, Vietnam
- Height: 1.62 m (5 ft 4 in)
- Position: Forward

Team information
- Current team: Phong Phú Hà Nam
- Number: 10

Senior career*
Years	Team	Apps	(Gls)
2007–	Phong Phú Hà Nam	162	(89)

International career^{‡}
2010–2019	Vietnam	27	(15)
2015–2021	Vietnam (futsal)	42	(17)
- * Club domestic league appearances and goals ‡ National team caps and goals as of 18:19, 22 March 2015 (UTC)

Lê Thu Thanh Hương (born 21 September 1991) is a Vietnamese footballer who plays as a forward for Phong Phú Hà Nam.

== International goals ==
Scores and results list Vietnam's goal tally first.

No.	Date	Venue	Opponent	Score	Result	Competition
1.	25 March 2011	Kaohsiung National Stadium, Kaohsiung, Taiwan	Thailand	2–1	2–1	2012 Summer Olympics qualifiers
2.	12 June 2011	King Abdullah Stadium, Amman, Jordan	Thailand	3–2	3–3	2012 Summer Olympics qualifiers
3.	20 October 2011	Chao Anouvong Stadium, Vientiane, Laos	Indonesia	7–0	14–0	2011 AFF Women's Championship
4.	20 October 2011	Chao Anouvong Stadium, Vientiane, Laos	Indonesia	9–0	14–0	2011 AFF Women's Championship
5.	20 October 2011	Chao Anouvong Stadium, Vientiane, Laos	Indonesia	10–0	14–0	2011 AFF Women's Championship
6.	25 October 2011	Chao Anouvong Stadium, Vientiane, Laos	Laos	5–0	6–0	2011 AFF Women's Championship
7.	15 September 2012	Thống Nhất Stadium, Ho Chi Minh City, Vietnam	Philippines	3–1	4–2	2012 AFF Women's Championship
8.	20 September 2012	Thống Nhất Stadium, Ho Chi Minh City, Vietnam	Laos	6–0	7–0	2012 AFF Women's Championship
9.	15 September 2013	Thuwunna Stadium, Yangon, Myanmar	Jordan	2–0	4–0	2013 AFF Women's Championship
10.	15 September 2013	Thuwunna Stadium, Yangon, Myanmar	Jordan	3–0	4–0	2013 AFF Women's Championship
11.	15 December 2013	Mandalarthiri Stadium, Mandalay, Myanmar	Myanmar	1–0	1–0	2013 Southeast Asian Games
12.	14 May 2014	Thong Nhat Stadium, Ho Chi Minh City, Vietnam	Jordan	2–1	3–1	2014 AFC Women's Asian Cup
13.	14 May 2014	Thong Nhat Stadium, Ho Chi Minh City, Vietnam	Jordan	3–1	3–1	2014 AFC Women's Asian Cup
