= Syria women's national football team =

Women's national association football team representing Syria

Syria
- Nickname(s): Nosour Qasioun (Arabic: نسور قاسيون, lit. 'The Qasioun Eagles')
- Association: Syrian Football Association (SFA)
- Other affiliation: UAFA (Arab Nations)
- Confederation: AFC (Asia)
- Sub-confederation: WAFF (West Asia)
- Head coach: Issam Khadem Eljama
- Captain: Elham Kord Oghlan
- Home stadium: Various
- FIFA code: SYR
First colours	Second colours

FIFA ranking
- Current: 162 ▼1 (16 June 2026)
- Highest: 104 (December 2017)
- Lowest: 162 (March – August 2024; December 2025)

First international
- Iran 5–0 Syria (Amman, Jordan; 23 September 2005)

Biggest win
- Syria 12–0 Qatar (Manama, Bahrain; 22 October 2010)

Biggest defeat
- Myanmar 14–0 Syria (Hanoi, Vietnam; 7 April 2017)

WAFF Women's Championship
- Appearances: 4 (first in 2005)
- Best result: Third place (2005, 2022)

Arab Women's Cup
- Appearances: 1 (first in 2006)
- Best result: Group stage (2006)
Medal record
Women's football
WAFF Women's Championship
Bronze medal – third place	2005 Jordan	Team
Bronze medal – third place	2022 Jordan	Team

The Syria national women's football team (Arabic: منتخب سوريا لكرة القدم للسيدات) is the national women's football team of Syria. The team was established in 2005, and is controlled by the Syrian Football Association (SFA), the governing body for football in Syria. The team has yet to qualify for the FIFA Women's World Cup, or the AFC Women's Asian Cup; their best achievement was a third-place finish in both the 2005 and 2022 editions of the West Asian Football Federation Women's Championship.

== History ==
Women's football began to develop in Syria around 1950, when the first women's football team in the Levant and the Middle East was established in Aleppo. Despite this, a women's football league or national team was not established until the beginning of the 21st century.

The national team was formed only in 2005, as one of the first in the WAFF, and played its first ever match in the 2005 West Asia Championship where the team lost 5–0 to Iran on 23 September. Syria won their following two matches in the competition, against Palestine (4–0) and Bahrain (2–1), to achieve a third-place finish with six points. At the 2007 edition, the team did not get any points in the matches against Iran, Jordan and Lebanon and finished in fourth place.

At the 2010 WAFF Women's Championship they did not participate. In October 2010, the team competed at the 2010 Arabia Women's Cup. In Group A they finished third with three points. The three points came from a 12–0 win over Qatar, which was their highest international win.

The next participation in the West Asia Championship was in the following year 2011, where the team in Group B scored only one goal and no points and finished last again.

The team took part in the 2018 AFC Women's Asian Cup qualification for the Women's Asian Cup. In group D of a qualifying tournament in Vietnam in April 2017, not a single win could be achieved either. They lost 1–0 to Singapore. Losses to Vietnam, Myanmar and Iran followed, each by at least eleven goals.

In 2021, the Syrian Football Association decided to renew and develop the women's national team. The manager of the national team and head of the women's section of the SFA was former football player Nancy Muammar, and the coach of the national team was appointed Salim Jablawi.

After home training camps, the team led by captain Elham Kord Oghlan played preparatory matches against Lebanon and the UAE. This preparation was followed by participation in the 2022 WAFF Women's Championship held in Jordan. In the first match, they faced a strong Jordan, losing 0–4, followed by a 1–1 draw with Palestine (goal scored by Aysha Hammou) and a 2–5 loss to Lebanon (goals scored by Gharib and Aya Mohammad). Despite two losses, the team took home bronze medals from Amman, as the final standings were decided by the number of goals scored, equaling the historic success in 2005.

== Team image ==
=== Nicknames ===
Syria women's national football team has been known and nicknamed as "Nosour Qasioun (Qasioun Eagles)".

=== Kits and crest ===
Syria women's national football team wears green shirts with green shorts and green socks, following the tradition of the Syria men's team. The current change kit is all white. Like all SFA squads, the women's national team is supplied by Jako, which had provided and specifically designed current female football jersey since 2022.

Kit supplier	Period	Notes
(Italy) Diadora	2007–2010	
(Germany) Adidas	2011–2014	
(Italy) Diadora	2016–2018	
(Germany) Adidas	2021–2022	
(Germany) Jako	2022–	

== Results and fixtures ==
The following is a list of match results in the last 12 months, as well as any future matches that have been scheduled.

Legend

Win Draw Lose Fixture

== Coaching staff ==
=== Current coaching staff ===
As of 23 November 2023

Position	Name
Manager	(Syria) Nancy Muamar
Coach	Issam Khadem Eljama
Assistant coach	Iva Ghazi
Goalkeeping coach	Fida Darwish
Fitness coach	(Syria) Bayen Elmigdah

== Players ==
=== Current squad ===
The following 24 players were called up for 2024 WAFF Women's Championship in two from 20–24 January 2024.

No.	Pos.	Player	Date of birth (age)	Club
1	GK	Khozama al-Melhem	2001 (age 24–25)	
22	GK	Raneem Abo Lateef	13 December 2005 (age 20)	(Syria) Al Hilal
23	GK	Kristen Hanosh	2007 (age 18–19)	
2	DF	Dlnay Ismail	2008 (age 17–18)	
3	DF	Elham Oglan	2002 (age 23–24)	(Syria) Al Hilal
5	DF	Mayar Alloush	2006 (age 19–20)	
13	DF	Rasha Ramadan	1989 (age 36–37)	
16	DF	Maria Elias	1997 (age 28–29)	
19	DF	Razan Khwande	2001 (age 24–25)	(Syria) Al Hilal
21	DF	Halaz Haji	25 August 2003 (age 23)	(Syria) Al Hilal
4	MF	Mai al-Jani	2006 (age 19–20)	
6	MF	Julnar Mustafa	2008 (age 17–18)	(Syria) Al Hilal
8	MF	Lana Ibrahem	2002 (age 23–24)	unattached
14	MF	Rand Ibrahim	2005 (age 20–21)	
15	MF	Taim al-Ahmad	2008 (age 17–18)	
17	MF	Sedra Khezran	2006 (age 19–20)	
7	FW	Aisha Hamo	2003 (age 22–23)	
9	FW	Nor Mustafa (captain)	29 November 2001 (age 24)	(Saudi Arabian Football Federation) Eastern Flames
10	FW	Maisalon Mahfoud	2001 (age 24–25)	
11	FW	Aya Mohammed	2006 (age 19–20)	(Syria) Al Hilal
12	FW	Hayat Dayoub	2007 (age 18–19)	(Syria) Al Hilal
18	FW	Lava Othman	2007 (age 18–19)	
20	FW	Seant Omar	2004 (age 21–22)	

=== Recent call-ups ===
The following players have also been called up to a squad in the last 12 months.

Pos.	Player	Date of birth (age)	Caps	Goals	Club	Latest call-up

== Competitive record ==
=== FIFA Women's World Cup ===
FIFA Women's World Cup record										Qualification record						
Host nation(s) and year	Round	Pos	Pld	W	D	L	GF	GA	Squad	Outcome	Pld	W	D	L	GF	GA
(China) 1991	Did not enter									Did not enter						
(Sweden) 1995	Did not enter									Did not enter						
(United States) 1999	Did not enter									Did not enter						
(United States) 2003	Did not enter									Did not enter						
(China) 2007	Did not enter									Did not enter						
(Germany) 2011	Did not enter									Did not enter						
(Canada) 2015	Did not enter									The 2014 AFC Women's Asian Cup served as the qualifying tournament						
(France) 2019	Did not qualify									The 2018 AFC Women's Asian Cup served as the qualifying tournament						
(Australia) (New Zealand) 2023	Did not enter									The 2022 AFC Women's Asian Cup served as the qualifying tournament						
(Brazil) 2027	Did not enter									The 2026 AFC Women's Asian Cup served as the qualifying tournament						
(Costa Rica) (Jamaica) (Mexico) (United States) 2031																
(United Kingdom) 2035																
Total	–	0/9	–	–	–	–	–	–	–	Total	–	–	–	–	–	–

*Draws include knockout matches decided on penalty kicks.

=== Olympic Games ===
Summer Olympics record										Qualification record						
Host nation(s) and year	Round	Pos	Pld	W	D	L	GF	GA	Squad	Outcome	Pld	W	D	L	GF	GA
(United States) 1996	Did not enter									The 1995 FIFA Women's World Cup served as the qualifying tournament						
(Australia) 2000	Did not enter									The 1999 FIFA Women's World Cup served as the qualifying tournament						
(Greece) 2004	Did not enter									Did not enter						
(China) 2008	Did not enter									Did not enter						
(United Kingdom) 2012	Did not enter									Did not enter						
(Brazil) 2016	Did not enter									Did not enter						
(Japan) 2020	Did not enter									Did not enter						
(France) 2024	Did not enter									Did not enter						
Total	–	0/7	–	–	–	–	–	–	–	Total	0	0	0	0	0	0

*Draws include knockout matches decided on penalty kicks.

=== AFC Women's Asian Cup ===
AFC Women's Asian Cup record										Qualification record						
Host nation(s) and year	Round	Pos	Pld	W	D	L	GF	GA	Squad	Outcome	Pld	W	D	L	GF	GA
(Hong Kong) 1975	Did not enter									Did not enter						
(Taiwan) 1977	Did not enter									Did not enter						
(India) 1980	Did not enter									Did not enter						
(Hong Kong) 1981	Did not enter									Did not enter						
(Thailand) 1983	Did not enter									Did not enter						
(Hong Kong) 1986	Did not enter									Did not enter						
(Hong Kong) 1989	Did not enter									Did not enter						
(Japan) 1991	Did not enter									Did not enter						
(Malaysia) 1993	Did not enter									Did not enter						
(Malaysia) 1995	Did not enter									Did not enter						
(China) 1997	Did not enter									Did not enter						
(Philippines) 1999	Did not enter									Did not enter						
(Chinese Taipei) 2001	Did not enter									Did not enter						
(Thailand) 2003	Did not enter									Did not enter						
(Australia) 2006	Did not enter									Did not enter						
(Vietnam) 2008	Did not enter									Did not enter						
(China) 2010	Did not enter									Did not enter						
(Vietnam) 2014	Did not enter									Did not enter						
(Jordan) 2018	Did not qualify									5th of 5	4	0	0	4	0	38
(India) 2022	Did not enter									Did not enter						
(Australia) 2026	Did not enter									Did not enter						
Total	–	0/19	–	–	–	–	–	–	–	Total	4	0	0	4	0	38

*Draws include knockout matches decided on penalty kicks.

=== WAFF Women's Championship ===
WAFF Women's Championship record
Hosts / Year	Result	GP	W	D*	L	GS	GA	GD
(Jordan) 2005	3rd place	4	2	0	2	6	12	−6
(Jordan) 2007	4th place	3	0	0	3	1	27	−26
(United Arab Emirates) 2010	Did not enter							
(United Arab Emirates) 2011	Group stage	3	0	0	3	1	11	−10
(Jordan) 2014	Did not enter							
(Bahrain) 2019	Did not enter							
(Jordan) 2022	3rd place	3	0	1	2	3	10	−7
(Saudi Arabia) 2024	Group stage	3	1	0	2	4	5	−1
(Saudi Arabia) 2025	Did not enter							
Total	5/9	16	3	1	12	15	65	−50

*Draws include knockout matches decided on penalty kicks.

=== Arab Women's Cup ===
Arab Women's Cup record
Hosts / Year	Result	GP	W	D*	L	GS	GA	GD
(Egypt) 2006	Group stage	3	1	0	2	2	17	−15
(Egypt) 2021	Did not enter							
Total	1/2	3	1	0	2	2	17	−15

=== Arabia Cup ===
Arabia Cup record
Hosts / Year	Result	GP	W	D*	L	GS	GA	GD
(Bahrain) 2010	Group stage	3	1	0	2	16	8	+8

== Records ==
As of 5 September 2022, the complete official match record of the Syrian women's national team comprises 33 matches: 7 wins, 2 draws, and 24 losses. During these matches, the team scored 39 times and conceded 144 goals. Syria's highest winning margin is 12 goals, which has been achieved against Qatar in 2010 (12–0).

=== FIFA world rankings ===
As of 15 December 2023

Best Ranking Best Mover Worst Ranking Worst Mover

Syria's FIFA world rankings
FIFA Rank	AFC Rank	Year	Games Played	Won	Lost	Drawn	Best		Worst	
FIFA Rank	AFC Rank	Year	Games Played	Won	Lost	Drawn	Rank	Move	Rank	Move
157	34	2022	8	2	4	3	157	0	157	0
158	34	2023	0	0	0	0	157	0	160	▼3

== Honours ==
=== Regional ===
- WAFF Women's Championship

3rd place: 2005, 2022

== See also ==
- Sport in Syria
  - Football in Syria
    - Women's football in Syria
- Women's association football around the world
- Syria men's national football team
