= Zahra Hatamnejad =

Iranian footballer (born 1986)

Personal information
- Full name: Zahra Hatamnejad
- Date of birth: 14 September 1986 (age 40)
- Place of birth: Ilam, Iran
- Position: Forward

Team information
- Current team: Palayesh Gaz Ilam
- Number: 23

Senior career*
Years	Team	Apps	(Gls)
- Palayesh Gaz Ilam

International career^{‡}
2011–2017	Iran	3+	(1)
- * Club domestic league appearances and goals ‡ National team caps and goals as of 11 April 2017

Zahra Hatamnejad (Persian: زهرا حاتم نژاد; born 14 September 1986) is an Iranian footballer who plays as a forward for Kowsar Women Football League club Palayesh Gaz Ilam. She has been a member of the senior Iran women's national team.

== International goals ==
No.	Date	Venue	Opponent	Score	Result	Competition
1.	10 March 2011	Prince Mohammed Stadium, Zarqa, Jordan	Jordan	1–1	1–1	2012 Summer Olympics qualification
