= Roukayah Al Fararjeh =

Jordanian footballer (born 2005)

Personal information
- Date of birth: 20 June 2005 (age 21)
- Place of birth: Australia
- Position: Forward

Team information
- Current team: Blacktown Spartans

Senior career*
Years	Team	Apps	(Gls)
2022–2023	Bankstown City Lions	16	(1)
2024–	Blacktown Spartans		

International career^{‡}
2024–	Jordan	8	(1)
- * Club domestic league appearances and goals ‡ National team caps and goals as of 8 April 2025

Roukayah Al Fararjeh (Arabic: رقية الفرارجة) is a footballer who plays as a forward for NSW League One Women's club Blacktown Spartans. Born in Australia, she represents Jordan at international level.

== International goals ==
No.	Date	Venue	Opponent	Score	Result	Competition
1.	23 October 2024	Emirhan Sports Complex, Antalya, Turkey	Haiti	2–4	2–4	2024 Pink Ladies Cup
2.	28 November 2025	Hall Stadium – King Abdullah Sports City, Jeddah, Saudi Arabia	Lebanon	3–0	5–0	2025 WAFF Women's Championship
3.	3 June 2026	King Abdullah II Stadium, Amman, Jordan	Malaysia	4–3	4–3	Friendly
