= Maria Rebello =

Indian footballer and football referee

Personal information
- Full name: Maria Piedade Rebello
- Place of birth: Curtorim, Goa, India

Senior career*
| Years | Team | Apps | (Gls) |
- Seraulim

International career
| 1994–2001 | India | | |
Refereeing career
Domestic
| Years | League | Role |
| 2013– | I-League | Referee |
International
| Years | League | Role |
| 2010– | AFC | Referee |
| 2011– | FIFA | Referee |
- * Club domestic league appearances and goals

Maria Piedade Rebello is an Indian former footballer and professional football referee who officiates primarily in the I-League, having been appointed to the list of I-League referees before the 2013–14 season, and has been a FIFA listed referee since 2011. Rebello is the only FIFA-listed women's referee from India. She is also the former captain of the India women's football team.

== Early life and footballing career ==
Born in Curtorim, Goa, Rebello started to play football from a young age with the local boys. She then played competitive football for her school side on less than satisfactory fields with makeshift goals which she said made her "rough and tough" and thus made it easier for her to become a footballer.

She then went on to captain the India women's team in the 2001 AFC Women's Championship in which India finished second-to-last in their group. She then retired early from the game.

== Refereeing career ==
After retiring from playing football, Rebello joined the Bombay Referees Association where she trained to become a referee. She then joined the Goa Football Association and refereed matches for men in the local leagues. Eventually she managed to referee matches in the Goa Professional League, the top football league in Goa. She also refereed matches in the SAFF Championship. She has also managed to referee matches at the professional and semi-professional club level in men's football in India by officiating matches in the Federation Cup and Santosh Trophy.

=== I-League ===
Rebello was then confirmed to be one of the referees on the list of referees for the 2013–14 season on 22 July 2013. She officiated her first I-League match on 8 March 2014 between Pune and Shillong Lajong. She gave four yellow cards out that match as the match ended 2–2.
