= Enshirah Al-Hyasat =

Jordanian footballer

Personal information
- Full name: Enshirah Ibrahim Mohammad Al-Hyasat
- Date of birth: November 25, 1991 (age 34)
- Place of birth: Jordan
- Position: Defender

Senior career*
Years	Team	Apps	(Gls)
–2022	Amman SC		
2022–2023	Orthodox Club		

International career^{‡}
2010–2021	Jordan	67	(5)

Managerial career
- 2023–: Al-Shoulla
- * Club domestic league appearances and goals ‡ National team caps and goals as of 25 September 2021

Enshirah Al-Hyasat (Arabic: انشراح حياصات; born 25 November 1991) is a Jordanian footballer who played as a defender for the Jordan women's national team between 2010 and 2021.
