= Nguyễn Hải Hòa =

Vietnamese footballer

Personal information
- Date of birth: 22 December 1989 (age 36)
- Place of birth: Phú Bình, Thái Nguyên, Vietnam
- Height: 1.62 m (5 ft 4 in)
- Position: Defender

Team information
- Current team: TNG Thái Nguyên
- Number: 2

Senior career*
Years	Team	Apps	(Gls)
2005–	TNG Thái Nguyên	202	(30)

International career^{‡}
2009–2018	Vietnam	65	(14)
- * Club domestic league appearances and goals ‡ National team caps and goals as of 21 May 2014

Nguyễn Hải Hòa (born 22 December 1989) is a Vietnamese footballer who plays as a defender for Women's Championship club TNG Thái Nguyên. She has been a member of the Vietnam women's national team.
