= Shahnaz Jebreen =

Jordanian footballer (born 1992)

Personal information
- Full name: Shahnaz Yaseen Mahmoud Jebreen
- Date of birth: 28 July 1992 (age 34)
- Place of birth: Amman, Jordan
- Height: 1.56 m (5 ft 1 in)
- Position: Midfielder

Team information
- Current team: Al-Ittihad

Senior career*
| Years | Team | Apps | (Gls) |
| –2022 | Amman | | |
| 2022 | Orthodox | | |
| 2022– | Al-Ittihad | 12 | (2) |

International career^{‡}
| 2006–2022 | Jordan | 133 | (43) |
- * Club domestic league appearances and goals ‡ National team caps and goals as of 15 November 2022

Shahnaz Yaseen Mahmoud Jebreen (Arabic: شهيناز جبرين; born 28 July 1992) is a Jordanian footballer who plays as a midfielder for Saudi club Al-Ittihad.

== Club career ==
At the club level, Jebreen played for Amman and Orthodox in Jordan. She was nominated Best Player of the 2022 WAFF Women's Clubs Championship, in which Orthodox finished runners-up.

== International career ==
Jebreen was part of the Jordan squad that competed at the 2010 Asian Games, where she assisted Jordan's first goal in the tournament, scored by Maysa Jbarah. Jebreen also took part in the 2014 AFC Women's Asian Cup.

== International goals ==
| No. | Date | Venue | Opponent | Score | Result | Competition |
|---|---|---|---|---|---|---|
| 1. | 25 April 2009 | KLFA Stadium, Kuala Lumpur, Malaysia | Kyrgyzstan | 7–1 | 7–1 | 2010 AFC Women's Asian Cup qualification |
| 2. | 20 July 2009 | Tainan County Stadium, Xinying City, Taiwan | Chinese Taipei | 1–0 | 1–0 | 2010 AFC Women's Asian Cup qualification |
| 3. | 19 April 2014 | Petra Stadium, Amman, Jordan | Palestine | 2–0 | 10–0 | 2014 WAFF Women's Championship |
| 4. | 13 March 2015 | Petra Stadium, Amman, Jordan | Palestine | 1–0 | 6–0 | 2016 AFC Women's Olympic Qualifying Tournament |
| 5. | 3 April 2017 | Pamir Stadium, Dushanbe, Tajikistan | Bahrain | 1–0 | 6–0 | 2018 AFC Women's Asian Cup qualification |
| 6. | 7 April 2017 | Pamir Stadium, Dushanbe, Tajikistan | Iraq | 1–0 | 10–0 | 2018 AFC Women's Asian Cup qualification |
| 7. | 10 April 2017 | Pamir Stadium, Dushanbe, Tajikistan | Tajikistan | 2–0 | 10–2 | 2018 AFC Women's Asian Cup qualification |
| 8. | 10 April 2017 | Pamir Stadium, Dushanbe, Tajikistan | Tajikistan | 3–0 | 10–2 | 2018 AFC Women's Asian Cup qualification |
| 9. | 10 April 2017 | Pamir Stadium, Dushanbe, Tajikistan | Tajikistan | 4–1 | 10–2 | 2018 AFC Women's Asian Cup qualification |
| 10. | 10 April 2017 | Pamir Stadium, Dushanbe, Tajikistan | Tajikistan | 7–1 | 10–2 | 2018 AFC Women's Asian Cup qualification |
| 11. | 27 November 2017 | TFF Riva Facility, Istanbul, Turkey | Turkey | 2–1 | 2–1 | Friendly |
| 12. | 2 February 2018 | Petra Stadium, Amman, Jordan | Afghanistan | 1–0 | 5–0 | Friendly |
| 13. | 5 February 2018 | Petra Stadium, Amman, Jordan | Afghanistan | 1–0 | 6–0 | Friendly |
| 14. | 5 February 2018 | Petra Stadium, Amman, Jordan | Afghanistan | 2–0 | 6–0 | Friendly |
| 15. | 9 April 2018 | King Abdullah Stadium, Amman, Jordan | Thailand | 1–4 | 1–6 | 2018 AFC Women's Asian Cup |
| 16. | 8 November 2018 | Faisal Al-Husseini International Stadium, Al-Ram, Palestine | Maldives | 2–0 | 6–0 | 2020 AFC Women's Olympic Qualifying Tournament |
| 17. | 11 November 2018 | Faisal Al-Husseini International Stadium, Al-Ram, Palestine | Palestine | 4–0 | 7–0 | 2020 AFC Women's Olympic Qualifying Tournament |
| 18. | 13 November 2018 | Faisal Al-Husseini International Stadium, Al-Ram, Palestine | Indonesia | 1–0 | 3–0 | 2020 AFC Women's Olympic Qualifying Tournament |
| 19. | 11 January 2019 | Al-Muharraq Stadium, Muharraq, Bahrain | Lebanon | 3–0 | 3–1 | 2019 WAFF Women's Championship |

== Honours ==
Amman

- AFC Women's Club Championship: 2021

Individual

- WAFF Women's Clubs Championship Best Player: 2022
