= Yasmeen Khair =

Jordanian footballer

Personal information
- Full name: Yasmeen Salim Hani Khair
- Date of birth: June 27, 1987 (age 39)
- Place of birth: Amman, Jordan
- Position: Defender

Team information
- Current team: Shabab Al-Ordon
- Number: 7

Senior career*
Years	Team	Apps	(Gls)
- Shabab Al-Ordon

International career^{‡}
2009–2018	Jordan	97	(5)
- * Club domestic league appearances and goals ‡ National team caps and goals as of 12 April 2018

Yasmeen Khair (born 27 June 1987) is a Jordanian footballer who plays as a defender for local Women's League club Shabab Al-Ordon. She is as well a former Arab gold medalist of the Jordanian National Gymnastics team.

Yasmeen competed in eleven international matches in a total of three international tournament: four qualifying matches for 2010 in China, three group stage matches for 2014 in Vietnam, three group stage matches for 2018 in Jordan, and one friendlies women match with Japan in 2017.

Yasmeen was a member of the Jordanian National Gymnastics Team until she was 16. She has been crowned four-time Arab gold medalist, three-time West Asia gold medalist and five-time youth gymnastics gold medalist. Currently, Khair plays as a defender for the Jordan national women's football team and the Shabab Al-Ordon women's team.
