= Sama'a Khraisat =

Jordanian footballer

Sama’a Khraisat
Personal information
- Full name: Sama’a Samir Hamad Khraisat
- Date of birth: August 15, 1991 (age 35)
- Place of birth: Amman, Jordan
- Position: Midfielder

International career
Years	Team	Apps	(Gls)
2005–2015	Jordan	58	(17)

Sama’a Khraisat (born 15 August 1991) is a Jordanian footballer who played as a midfielder.

== International goals ==
No.	Date	Venue	Opponent	Score	Result	Competition
1.	8 March 2011	Prince Mohammed Stadium, Zarqa, Jordan	Bahrain	1–1	1–1	2012 Summer Olympics
2.	5 June 2013	Amman International Stadium, Amman, Jordan	Lebanon	4–0	5–0	2014 AFC Women's Asian Cup qualification
3.	5 June 2013	Amman International Stadium, Amman, Jordan	Lebanon	5–0	5–0	2014 AFC Women's Asian Cup qualification
4.	9 June 2013	Amman International Stadium, Amman, Jordan	Uzbekistan	1–0	4–0	2014 AFC Women's Asian Cup qualification
5.	9 June 2013	Amman International Stadium, Amman, Jordan	Uzbekistan	4–0	4–0	2014 AFC Women's Asian Cup qualification
