= Farah Al-Azab =

Jordanian footballer

Personal information
- Full name: Farah Emad Ahmad Al-Azab
- Date of birth: 1986 (age 39–40)
- Position: Midfielder

International career
Years	Team	Apps	(Gls)
2005–2013	Jordan	41	(18)

Farah Emad Ahmad Al-Azab is a Jordanian footballer who plays as a midfielder. She was a member of the Jordan women's national team.

== International goals ==
No.	Date	Venue	Opponent	Score	Result	Competition
1.	25 April 2009	KLFA Stadium, Kuala Lumpur, Malaysia	Kyrgyzstan	1–0	7–1	2010 AFC Women's Asian Cup qualification
2.	1 May 2009	KLFA Stadium, Kuala Lumpur, Malaysia	Palestine	4–0	5–0	2010 AFC Women's Asian Cup qualification
