= Jordan women's national football team =

Women's national association football team representing Jordan

Jordan
- Nickname(s): نشميات الأردن; Nashmeyat Al-Urdon ("The Chivalrous of Jordan")
- Association: Jordan Football Association
- Confederation: AFC (Asia)
- Sub-confederation: WAFF (West Asia)
- Head coach: Lamia Boumehdi
- Captain: Maysa Jbarah
- Most caps: Ayah Al-Majali (155)
- Top scorer: Maysa Jbarah (147)
- FIFA code: JOR
First colours	Second colours	Third colours

FIFA ranking
- Current: 76 (16 June 2026)
- Highest: 50 (June – December 2017)
- Lowest: 76 (August – June 2026)

First international
- Jordan 6–1 Bahrain (Amman, Jordan; 18 September 2005)

Biggest win
- Kuwait 0–21 Jordan (Amman, Jordan; 7 June 2013)

Biggest defeat
- Japan 13–0 Jordan (Doha, Qatar; 30 November 2006)

Asian Cup
- Appearances: 2 (first in 2014)
- Best result: Group stage (2014, 2018)

Arab Cup
- Appearances: 1 (first in 2021)
- Best result: Champions (2021)

WAFF Championship
- Appearances: 8 (first in 2005)
- Best result: Champions (2005, 2007, 2014, 2019, 2022, 2024)
Medal record
WAFF Women's Championship
Gold medal – first place	2005 Jordan	Team
Gold medal – first place	2007 Jordan	Team
Gold medal – first place	2014 Jordan	Team
Gold medal – first place	2019 Bahrain	Team
Gold medal – first place	2022 Jordan	Team
Gold medal – first place	2024 Saudi Arabia	Team
Silver medal – second place	2010 UAE	Team
Arab Women's Cup
Gold medal – first place	2021 Egypt	Team

The Jordan women's national football team (Arabic: منتخب الأردن لكرة القدم للسيدات) is the official women's national football team of the country of Jordan. The team was established in 2005, and is controlled by the Jordan Football Association (JFA), the governing body for football in Jordan.

While the team has yet to qualify for the FIFA Women's World Cup, they took part in the AFC Women's Asian Cup in 2014 and 2018, failing to qualify past the group stage on both occasions. Jordan are regulars at the WAFF Women's Championship, which they have won a record six titles, and have taken part in the Arab Women's Cup, which they won in 2021.

== History ==
Women's football in Jordan officially began in 2005 with the establishment of the national team. Despite having a limited pool of players at the time, the team made an immediate impact by winning the inaugural WAFF Women’s Championship that same year. Jordan won all its matches in the tournament, scoring 26 goals and conceding only one, culminating in a 2–1 victory over Iran in the final.

The development of the women's national team received direct support from Prince Ali bin Hussein, who played a pivotal role not only in promoting the sport within Jordan but also in advocating for broader reforms in women’s football globally. Notably, he was instrumental in the successful campaign to lift FIFA's ban on headscarves in 2014, an important step for inclusivity in the sport, especially in Muslim-majority countries.

In 2006, the Jordanian team took part in the Asian Games held in Doha, Qatar. Drawn into a challenging group with Japan, China, and Thailand, and fielding a young squad, the team exited in the first round without scoring. On 30 November 2006, Jordan recorded its heaviest defeat to date, losing 13–0 to Japan. That year, the team also entered the FIFA Women's World Ranking for the first time, debuting at 62nd out of 141 nations.

The following years saw fluctuating performances. After withdrawing from the qualifiers for the 2008 Olympics and failing to progress in the 2010 AFC Women's Asian Cup qualification, the team rebounded by winning the 2010 Arabia Women's Cup in Bahrain, defeating Egypt in the final.

In the AFC Olympic qualifiers for the 2012 London Games, Jordan advanced past the first round by finishing top of Group C, which they hosted in Zarqa. However, it was eliminated in the second round after a series of defeats.

In 2013, Jordan hosted the AFC Women’s Asian Cup qualification matches in Amman. The team dominated its group, defeating Lebanon 5–0, Kuwait 21–0 (a record victory with eight goals by Maysa Jbarah) and Uzbekistan 4–0. This earned Jordan its first-ever appearance at the AFC Women’s Asian Cup finals, held in Vietnam in 2014.

Jordan further solidified its status as a regional leader in women’s football by hosting the 2016 FIFA U-17 Women’s World Cup, the first time a FIFA women’s tournament was held in the Arab world. Two years later, it became the first Arab nation to host the AFC Women’s Asian Cup in 2018, reinforcing its growing role in advancing the women’s game both regionally and internationally.

== Results and fixtures ==
The following is a list of match results in the last 12 months, as well as any future matches that have been scheduled.

Legend

Win Draw Loss Fixture

=== 2025 ===
24 November 2025 WAFF Championship GS	Palestine	0–3	Jordan	Jeddah, Saudi Arabia
16:45		Report	Sweilem 13'; Feras 35'; N. Phillips 66' (o.g.)	Stadium: Hall Stadium – King Abdullah Sports City; Referee: Doumouh Al-Bakkar (Lebanon)

28 November 2025 WAFF Championship GS	Jordan	5–0	Lebanon	Jeddah, Saudi Arabia
16:45	Sweilem 17'; Tamimi 29'; Al-Fararjeh 37'; Arabi 43' (o.g.); M. Abu Tayeh 54'	Report		Stadium: Hall Stadium – King Abdullah Sports City, Jeddah; Referee: Rawdha Al-Mansoori (United Arab Emirates)

30 November 2025 WAFF Championship SF	Jordan	3–0	Iraq	Jeddah, Saudi Arabia
16:45	Al-Majali 54'; M. Abu Tayeh 84'; Al-Btoush 90+1'	Report		Stadium: Hall Stadium – King Abdullah Sports City; Referee: Mohammed Al-Manii (Oman)

2 December 2025 WAFF Championship F	Palestine	1–3	Jordan	Jeddah, Saudi Arabia
19:45	Youssef 85'	Report	Akroush 15'; Al-Majali 30' (pen.); F. Abu Tayeh 64'	Stadium: Prince Abdullah Al-Faisal Sports City Stadium; Referee: Said Al-Mezeini (Oman)

=== 2026 ===
3 June Friendly	Jordan	4–3	Malaysia	Amman, Jordan
18:00 UTC+3	M. Abu Tayeh 7'; Siti Nurfaizah 46' (o.g.); Jbarah 79'; Al Fararjeh 90+5'	Report	Ainsyah 18'; Najwa 25', 37'	Stadium: King Abdullah Stadium

9 June Friendly	Palestine	0–1	Jordan	Amman, Jordan
18:00 UTC+3		Report	Jbarah 46' (pen.)	Stadium: King Abdullah Stadium

7 October Friendly	Jordan	1–2	Armenia	Aqaba, Jordan
18:00 UTC+3	Jbarah 90+1'	Report	Dallakyan 45+1'; Artin 54'	Stadium: Al-Aqaba Stadium

13 October Friendly	Jordan	0–0	Indonesia	Aqaba, Jordan
18:00 UTC+3		Report		Stadium: Al-Aqaba Stadium

== Coaching staff ==
=== Current coaching staff ===
Position	Name
Head coach	(Morocco) Lamia Boumehdi
Assistant coach	(Jordan) Sawsan Al-Hasaseen (Jordan) Sama'a Khraisat (Jordan) Manar Fraij
Goalkeeping coach	(Jordan) Emad Al-Tarayrah
Physiotherapist	(Jordan) Alena Abu Shelbaeh (Jordan) Mohammad Hassan
Doctor	(Jordan) Hussein Abu Dayah

=== Managerial history ===
As of 14 March 2026

- (Jordan) Maher Abu Hantash (2005)
- (Jordan) Issa Al-Turk (2006)
- (Jordan) Maher Abu Hantash (2007–2010)
- (Netherlands) Hester Jannet (2010–2011)
- (Japan) Masahiko Okiyama (2013–2014)
- (Jordan) Khader Eid (2015)
- (Jordan) Maher Abu Hantash (2017)
- (United States) Michael Dickey (2017–2018)
- (Algeria) Azzedine Chih (2018–2019)
- (Portugal) David Nascimento (2021–2023)
- (Jordan) Maher Abu Hantash (2024–2025)
- (Portugal) David Nascimento (2025–2026)
- (Morocco) Lamia Boumehdi (2026–)

== Players ==
=== Current squad ===
The following players were called up for the friendly matches against Armenia and Indonesia on 7 and 13 October 2026, respectively.

Caps and goals correct as of 9 June 2026, after the match against Palestine.

No.	Pos.	Player	Date of birth (age)	Caps	Goals	Club
1	GK	Shireen Al-Shalabi	3 June 1994 (age 32)	54	0	(Jordan Football Association) Etihad
12	GK	Farah Omar		0	0	(Jordan Football Association) Nashama Al-Mustaqbal
22	GK	Malak Shannak	1 August 1998 (age 28)	22	0	(Jordan Football Association) Amman FC
	GK	Sabrina Nassar		0	0	(United States Soccer Federation) Carolina Crew
3	DF	Alanoud Ghazi	18 May 1999 (age 27)	43	0	(Jordan Football Association) Etihad
4	DF	Alia Hasan	17 October 2004 (age 21)	5	0	(Jordan Football Association) Al-Nasser
5	DF	Farah Abu Tayeh	13 June 1998 (age 28)	16	3	(Hellenic Football Federation) Kifisia
7	DF	Nour Zoqash	1 September 1999 (age 27)	57	0	(Jordan Football Association) Amman FC
19	DF	Ayah Al-Majali	9 March 1992 (age 34)	155	9	(Saudi Arabian Football Federation) Al-Ula
20	DF	Lana Feras	1 June 1998 (age 28)	64	5	(Jordan Football Association) Etihad
21	DF	Rand Abu-Hussein	1 March 1997 (age 29)	60	0	(Jordan Football Association) Amman FC
2	MF	Tuqa Ghazi	29 July 2005 (age 21)	12	0	(Jordan Football Association) Etihad
8	MF	Enas Al-Jamaeen	11 November 2003 (age 22)	51	4	(Jordan Football Association) Etihad
13	MF	Charlotte Al-Abyad	12 February 1994 (age 32)	4	0	(Jordan Football Association) Orthodox
14	MF	Yasmine Al-Ajrab	1 February 2005 (age 21)	18	0	(Jordan Football Association) Istiqlal
16	MF	Layan Ajrameh	20 August 1999 (age 27)	0	0	(Jordan Football Association) Amman FC
18	MF	Tahreer Al-Qawasameh	26 October 2002 (age 23)	7	0	(Jordan Football Association) Al-Nasser
9	FW	Bana Al-Bitar	6 October 1996 (age 30)	48	8	(Jordan Football Association) Nashama Al-Mustaqbal
10	FW	Roukayah Al Fararjeh	20 June 2005 (age 21)	14	3	(Football Australia) Western City Rangers
11	FW	Maysa Jbarah (captain)	20 September 1989 (age 37)	153	147	(Jordan Football Association) Amman FC
15	FW	Mai Sweilem	25 September 1995 (age 31)	80	17	(Jordan Football Association) Etihad
17	FW	Haya Abu Ali	3 March 2009 (age 17)	0	0	(Jordan Football Association) Etihad
23	FW	Selena Dahkour		0	0	(Canadian Soccer Association) Cambridge United Reserves
	FW	Tmara Ahmad		0	0	(Jordan Football Association) Al-Nasser

=== Recent call-ups ===
The following players have also been called up to the squad within the past 12 months.

Pos.	Player	Date of birth (age)	Caps	Goals	Club	Latest call-up
GK	Sereen Ihraibi	22 June 2004 (age 22)	0	0	(Jordan) Etihad	v. Palestine, 9 June 2026
GK	Joud Al-Abadi	12 October 2005 (age 21)	0	0	(Jordan) Istiqlal	v. Palestine, 9 June 2026
GK	Rawand Kassab	6 November 2003 (age 22)	14	0	(Saudi Arabia) Al-Ahli	2025 WAFF Women's Championship
DF	Raneem Daoud	28 June 2006 (age 20)	1	0	(Jordan) Al-Nasser	v. Palestine, 9 June 2026
DF	Farah Al-Zaben	6 August 1999 (age 27)	0	0		v. Palestine, 9 June 2026
DF	Rania Salama	29 January 1997 (age 29)	0	0	(Jordan) Al-Hussein	2025 WAFF Women's Championship
MF	Marah Abu Tayeh	13 June 1998 (age 28)	6	2	(Germany) Borussia Dortmund	v. Palestine, 9 June 2026
MF	Celine Akroush	15 October 2003 (age 22)	14	3	(United States) Redlands Bulldogs	v. Palestine, 9 June 2026
MF	Tasneem Abu-Rob	14 November 2000 (age 25)	69	1	(Jordan) Orthodox	v. Palestine, 9 June 2026
FW	Leen Al-Btoush	20 July 2001 (age 25)	38	2	(Jordan) Etihad	v. Palestine, 9 June 2026
FW	Yasmeen Al Zurikat	20 May 2007 (age 19)	3	0	(Germany) VfR Warbeyen	v. Palestine, 9 June 2026
FW	Ida Tamimi	28 November 2003 (age 22)	3	1	(Sweden) IF Brommapojkarna	2025 WAFF Women's Championship
FW	Jinan Said	4 November 1996 (age 29)	2	0	(United States) Capo FC	2025 WAFF Women's Championship
FW	Retal Al-Shobaki	9 July 2006 (age 20)	0	0	(Jordan) Istiqlal	2025 WAFF Women's Championship
Notes: ^{INJ} = Withdrew due to injury; ^{PRE} = Preliminary squad / standby; ^{RET} = Retired from the national team

=== Previous squads ===
AFC Women's Asian Cup

- 2014 AFC Women's Asian Cup squad
- 2018 AFC Women's Asian Cup squad

== Individual records ==
As of 9 June 2026
Players in bold are still active with Jordan.

=== Most-capped players ===
Rank	Player	Caps	Goals	Period
1	**Ayah Al-Majali**	155	9	2006–present
2	**Maysa Jbarah**	153	147	2005–present
3	Shahnaz Jebreen	133	43	2006–2022
4	Stephanie Al-Naber	128	79	2005–2019
5	Shorooq Shathli	109	1	2005–2019
6	Yasmeen Khair	97	5	2005–2018
7	**Mai Sweilem**	80	17	2010–present
8	Luna Al-Masri	75	16	2009–2021
9	**Tasneem Abu-Rob**	69	1	2013–present
9	**Rouzbahan Fraij**	69	4	2017–present

=== Top scorers ===
Rank	Player	Goals	Caps	Average	Period
1	**Maysa Jbarah**	147	153	0.96	2005–present
2	Stephanie Al-Naber	79	128	0.62	2005–2019
3	Shahnaz Jebreen	43	133	0.32	2006–2022
4	Abeer Al-Nahar	26	43	0.6	2009–2019
5	Farah Al-Azab	18	41	0.44	2005–2013
6	Sama'a Khraisat	17	58	0.29	2005–2015
6	**Mai Sweilem**	17	80	0.21	2010–present
8	Luna Al-Masri	16	75	0.21	2009–2021
9	Anfal Al-Sufy	9	60	0.15	2013–2023
9	**Ayah Al-Majali**	9	155	0.06	2006–present

== Competitive record ==
=== FIFA Women's World Cup ===
FIFA Women's World Cup record
Year	Result	Position	GP	W	D*	L	GF	GA	GD
(China) 2007	Did not enter								
(Germany) 2011	Did not qualify								
(Canada) 2015	Did not qualify								
(France) 2019	Did not qualify								
(Australia) (New Zealand) 2023	Did not qualify								
(Brazil) 2027	Did not qualify								
(Costa Rica) (Jamaica) (Mexico) (United States) 2031	To be determined								
(United Kingdom) 2035	To be determined								
Total	0/9	-	-	-	-	-	-	-	-

*Draws include knockout matches decided on penalty kicks.

=== Olympic Games ===
Summer Olympics record
Hosts / Year	Result	GP	W	D*	L	GS	GA	GD
(United States) 1996	Did not enter							
(Australia) 2000	Did not enter							
(Greece) 2004	Did not enter							
(China) 2008	Withdrew from the qualifications							
(United Kingdom) 2012	Did not qualify							
(Brazil) 2016	Did not qualify							
(Japan) 2020	Did not qualify							
Total	0/7							

*Draws include knockout matches decided on penalty kicks.

=== AFC Women's Asian Cup ===
AFC Women's Asian Cup record
Year	Result	GP	W	D*	L	GF	GA	GD
(Australia) 2006	Did not enter							
(Vietnam) 2008	Did not enter							
(China) 2010	Did not qualify							
(Vietnam) 2014	Group stage	3	0	0	3	2	13	−11
(Jordan) 2018	Group Stage	3	0	0	3	3	16	−13
(India) 2022	Did not qualify							
(Australia) 2026	Did not qualify							
(Uzbekistan) 2029	To be determined							
Total	2/6	6	0	0	6	5	29	−24

*Draws include knockout matches decided on penalty kicks.

=== Asian Games ===
Asian Games record
Year	Result	Position	Pld	W	D	L	GF	GA
(China) 1990	Did not enter							
(Japan) 1994	Did not enter							
(Thailand) 1998	Did not enter							
(South Korea) 2002	Did not enter							
(Qatar) 2006	Preliminary round	8	3	0	0	3	0	30
(China) 2010	Preliminary round	7	3	0	0	3	1	18
(South Korea) 2014	Preliminary round	10	3	0	1	2	2	19
(Indonesia) 2018	Did not enter							
(China) 2022	Did not enter							
(Japan) 2026	To be determined							
Total	3/8	-	9	0	1	8	3	67

=== WAFF Women's Championship ===
WAFF Women's Championship record
Hosts / Year	Result	GP	W	D*	L	GS	GA	GD
(Jordan) 2005	Champions	4	4	0	0	26	1	+25
(Jordan) 2007	Champions	3	3	0	0	12	2	+10
(United Arab Emirates) 2010	Runners-up	4	3	0	1	18	2	+16
(United Arab Emirates) 2011	Fourth place	5	2	2	1	16	6	+10
(Jordan) 2014	Champions	3	3	0	0	22	0	+22
(Bahrain) 2019	Champions	4	4	0	0	11	2	+9
(Jordan) 2022	Champions	3	3	0	0	10	1	+9
(Saudi Arabia) 2024	Champions	5	4	1	0	15	3	+12
(Saudi Arabia) 2025	Champions	4	4	0	0	14	1	+13
Total	9/9	35	30	3	2	144	18	+126

*Draws include knockout matches decided on penalty kicks.

=== AFF Women's Championship ===
AFF Women's Championship record
Year	Result	Pld	W	D	L	GF	GA
Invitee
(Myanmar) 2013	Group stage	4	1	0	3	2	13
Total	1/12	4	1	0	3	2	13

=== Other tournaments ===
Tournament	Result
(Bahrain) 2010 Arabia Cup	First place
(Myanmar) 2013 AFF Women's Championship	Round 1
(Turkey) 2019 Turkish Women's Cup	Seventh place
2021 Armenia Friendly Tournament	Third place

== FIFA world rankings ==
As of 24 August 2021

Best Ranking Best Mover Worst Ranking Worst Mover

Jordan's FIFA world rankings
Rank	Year	Games Played	Won	Lost	Drawn	Best		Worst	
Rank	Year	Games Played	Won	Lost	Drawn	Rank	Move	Rank	Move
63	2021	5	1	3	1	59	▲0	63	▼4

== Record per opponent ==
Key

Positive balance (more wins than losses)
Neutral balance (as many wins as losses)
Negative balance (more losses than wins)

The following table shows Jordan's all-time official international record per opponent.

Opponent	Pld	W	D	L	GF	GA	GD	W%	PPG (Note: According to the "three points for a win" standard)	Confederation
Afghanistan	2	2	0	0	11	0	+11	100%	3.00	AFC
Algeria	5	2	0	3	8	10	−2	40%	1.20	CAF
Armenia	1	0	1	0	1	1	0	0%	1.00	UEFA
Australia	1	0	0	1	1	3	−2	0%	0.00	AFC
Bahrain	11	8	3	0	41	6	+35	73%	2.46	AFC
Bangladesh	2	1	1	0	7	2	+5	50%	2.00	AFC
Bhutan	2	1	0	1	4	2	+2	50%	1.50	AFC
Bosnia and Herzegovina	2	0	1	1	4	6	−2	0%	0.50	UEFA
China	4	0	0	4	2	35	−33	0%	0.00	AFC
Chinese Taipei	5	1	2	2	5	9	−4	20%	1.00	AFC
Croatia	1	0	0	1	0	3	−3	0%	0.00	UEFA
Egypt	12	4	2	6	11	16	−5	33%	1.17	CAF
Guam	1	1	0	0	3	0	+3	100%	3.00	AFC
Haiti	1	0	0	1	2	4	−2	0%	0.00	CONCACAF
Hong Kong	2	1	1	0	1	0	+1	50%	2.00	AFC
India	4	1	1	2	2	4	−2	25%	1.00	AFC
Indonesia	2	1	1	0	5	2	+3	50%	2.00	AFC
Iran	13	4	3	6	19	19	0	31%	1.15	AFC
Iraq	4	4	0	0	37	0	+37	100%	3.00	AFC
Japan	4	0	0	4	0	34	−34	0%	0.00	AFC
Kazakhstan	1	0	1	0	1	1	0	0%	1.00	UEFA
Kuwait	1	1	0	0	21	0	+21	100%	3.00	AFC
Kyrgyzstan	1	1	0	0	7	1	+6	100%	3.00	AFC
Laos	2	1	0	1	8	4	+4	50%	1.50	AFC
Latvia	2	2	0	0	5	3	+2	100%	3.00	UEFA
Lebanon	11	11	0	0	45	4	+41	100%	3.00	AFC
Lithuania	1	0	0	1	0	1	−1	0%	0.00	UEFA
Malaysia	2	2	0	0	4	1	+3	100%	3.00	AFC
Maldives	2	2	0	0	15	0	+15	100%	3.00	AFC
Mexico	1	0	0	1	1	5	−4	0%	0.00	CONCACAF
Morocco	2	1	1	0	4	3	+1	50%	2.00	CAF
Myanmar	2	0	0	2	0	5	−5	0%	0.00	AFC
Nepal	1	0	1	0	2	2	0	0%	1.00	AFC
Northern Ireland	1	0	0	1	0	6	−6	0%	0.00	UEFA
Palestine	17	16	1	0	95	7	+88	94%	2.88	AFC
Philippines	3	1	0	2	6	6	0	33%	1.00	AFC
Poland	1	0	0	1	0	2	−2	0%	0.00	UEFA
Qatar	1	1	0	0	7	0	+7	100%	3.00	AFC
Romania	2	0	0	2	2	5	−3	0%	0.00	UEFA
Russia	1	0	0	1	0	3	−3	0%	0.00	UEFA
Saudi Arabia	1	1	0	0	3	1	+2	100%	3.00	AFC
Singapore	1	1	0	0	5	0	+5	100%	3.00	AFC
South Korea	1	0	0	1	0	5	−5	0%	0.00	AFC
Syria	5	5	0	0	29	2	+27	100%	3.00	AFC
Tajikistan	1	1	0	0	10	2	+8	100%	3.00	AFC
Thailand	7	1	0	6	3	27	−24	14%	0.43	AFC
Timor-Leste	1	1	0	0	3	1	+2	100%	3.00	AFC
Tunisia	5	1	1	3	6	11	−5	20%	0.80	CAF
Turkey	3	1	0	2	2	13	−11	33%	1.00	UEFA
Turkmenistan	1	1	0	0	3	0	+3	100%	3.00	AFC
United Arab Emirates	3	2	0	1	10	2	+8	67%	2.00	AFC
Uzbekistan	7	2	1	4	8	15	−7	29%	1.00	AFC
Vietnam	10	0	1	9	4	24	−20	0%	0.10	AFC
Total	180	87	23	70	473	318	+155	48.33	1.58	—

The following table shows Jordan's all-time official international record against reserve and youth teams.

Opponent	Pld	W	D	L	GF	GA	GD	W%	PPG	Confederation
Australia U20	1	0	0	1	1	5	−4	0%	0.00	AFC
France B	1	0	0	1	0	10	−10	0%	0.00	UEFA
Netherlands U19	1	0	0	1	0	9	−9	0%	0.00	UEFA
Total	3	0	0	1	1	24	−23	0.00	0.00	—

Notes

[IRN]: In 2011, the Iranian government did not permit its female players to remove the hijab during matches, which violated FIFA regulations. As a result, on 3 July 2011, Jordan was awarded a 3–0 win over Iran. This match is not included in the table above, as only matches that were actually played are listed.

== See also ==
- Sport in Jordan
  - Football in Jordan
    - Women's football in Jordan
- Women's football
- Jordan women's national under-20 football team
- Jordan women's national under-17 football team
- Jordan men's national football team
