= Palestine women's national football team results =

This is a list of the Palestine women's national football team since their inception in 2003.

== Record per opponent ==
Key

Positive balance (more wins than losses)
Neutral balance (as many wins as losses)
Negative balance (more losses than wins)

The following table shows Palestine's all-time official international record per opponent.

Opponent	Pld	W	D	L	GF	GA	GD	W%	Confederation
Algeria	1	0	0	1	1	4	−3	0.00	CAF
Bahrain	10	3	2	5	10	26	−16	30.00	AFC
Chinese Taipei	2	0	0	2	0	13	−13	0.00	AFC
Egypt	2	0	0	2	0	13	−13	0.00	CAF
Hong Kong	1	0	1	0	2	2	0	0.00	AFC
India	1	0	1	0	1	1	0	0.00	AFC
Indonesia	1	0	1	0	1	1	0	0.00	AFC
Iran	3	0	0	3	0	20	−20	0.00	AFC
Iraq	2	2	0	0	6	0	+6	100.00	AFC
Jordan	18	0	1	17	7	96	−89	0.00	AFC
Kuwait	1	1	0	0	17	0	+17	100.00	AFC
Kyrgyzstan	1	0	0	1	1	4	−3	0.00	AFC
Lebanon	9	1	2	6	8	19	−11	11.11	AFC
Malaysia	3	1	0	2	2	3	−1	33.33	AFC
Maldives	2	2	0	0	6	1	+5	100.00	AFC
Myanmar	1	0	0	1	0	9	−9	0.00	AFC
Nepal	1	0	0	1	0	4	−4	0.00	AFC
North Korea	1	0	0	1	0	10	−10	0.00	AFC
Philippines	1	0	0	1	0	7	−7	0.00	AFC
Qatar	2	2	0	0	22	0	+22	100.00	AFC
Saudi Arabia	5	1	3	1	2	3	−1	20.00	AFC
Syria	5	2	1	2	8	10	−2	40.00	AFC
Tajikistan	3	0	0	3	0	14	−14	0.00	AFC
Thailand	1	1	0	0	3	0	+3	100.00	AFC
Tunisia	2	0	0	2	4	12	−8	0.00	CAF
United Arab Emirates	3	0	1	2	4	8	−4	0.00	AFC
Uzbekistan	3	0	0	3	0	15	−15	0.00	AFC
Total	85	16	19	56	105	295	−190	18.80	—

Last updated: Palestine vs Lebanon, 13 October 2026.

== Results ==
Win Draw Loss Fixtures

=== 2005 ===
23 September 2005 2005 WAFF Championship	Jordan	9–0	Palestine	Amman, Jordan
--:-- UTC+3				Stadium: Amman International Stadium

25 September 2005 2005 WAFF Championship	Palestine	0–4	Syria	Amman, Jordan
--:-- UTC+3				Stadium: Amman International Stadium

29 September 2005 2005 WAFF Championship	Palestine	0–7	Iran	Amman, Jordan
--:-- UTC+3				Stadium: Amman International Stadium

1 October 2005 2005 WAFF Championship	Bahrain	1–1	Palestine	Amman, Jordan
--:-- UTC+3				Stadium: Amman International Stadium

=== 2006 ===
20 April 2006 Friendly	Syria	2–1	Palestine
--:-- UTC+0

22 April 2006 Friendly	Palestine	0–4	Tunisia
--:-- UTC+0

24 April 2006 Friendly	Egypt	9–0	Palestine
--:-- UTC+0

=== 2009 ===
25 April 2009 2010 Asian Cup qualification	Palestine	4–0	Maldives	Kuala Lumpur, Malaysia
19:30 UTC+8	Sohgian 40'; Hussein 45', 53'; Jorban 60'	Report		Stadium: KLFA Stadium; Attendance: 100; Referee: Rita Gani (Malaysia)

27 April 2009 2010 Asian Cup qualification	Palestine	1–4	Kyrgyzstan	Kuala Lumpur, Malaysia
19:30 UTC+8	Shaheen 90'	Report	Litvinenko 7', 53', 81'; Pokachalova 55'	Stadium: KLFA Stadium; Attendance: 100; Referee: Ri Hyang Ok (Korea DPR)

29 April 2009 2010 Asian Cup qualification	Uzbekistan	5–0	Palestine	Kuala Lumpur, Malaysia
17:00 UTC+8	Abdurasulova 10', 14', 85'; Sarikova 42'; Senina 74'	Report		Stadium: KLFA Stadium; Attendance: 70; Referee: Shen Huangying (China)

1 May 2009 2010 Asian Cup qualification	Jordan	5–0	Palestine	Kuala Lumpur, Malaysia
17:00 UTC+8	Al-Naber 24', 50'; Jbarah 35', 42'; Al-Âzb 44'	Report		Stadium: KLFA Stadium; Attendance: 60; Referee: Rita Gani (Malaysia)

26 October 2009 Friendly	Palestine	2–2	Jordan
--:-- UTC+1

=== 2010 ===
20 February 2010 2010 WAFF Championship	United Arab Emirates	4–2	Palestine	Abu Dhabi, United Arab Emirates
--:-- UTC+4

22 February 2010 2010 WAFF Championship	Palestine	17–0	Kuwait	Abu Dhabi, United Arab Emirates
--:-- UTC+4

26 February 2010 2010 WAFF Championship	Jordan	10–0	Palestine	Abu Dhabi, United Arab Emirates
--:-- UTC+4

28 February 2010 2010 WAFF Championship	Bahrain	3–0	Palestine	Abu Dhabi, United Arab Emirates
--:-- UTC+4

18 October 2010 2010 Arabia Women's Cup	Palestine	5–3	Syria	Zinj, Bahrain
--:-- UTC+3				Stadium: Al Ahli Stadium

20 October 2010 2010 Arabia Women's Cup	Qatar	0–18	Palestine	Zinj, Bahrain
--:-- UTC+3				Stadium: Al Ahli Stadium

22 October 2010 2010 Arabia Women's Cup	Bahrain	2–0	Palestine	Zinj, Bahrain
--:-- UTC+3				Stadium: Al Ahli Stadium

25 October 2010 2010 Arabia Women's Cup	Egypt	4–0	Palestine	Riffa, Bahrain
--:-- UTC+3				Stadium: Bahrain National Stadium

27 October 2010 2010 Arabia Women's Cup	Bahrain	5–1	Palestine	Riffa, Bahrain
--:-- UTC+3				Stadium: Bahrain National Stadium

7 November 2010 Friendly	Tunisia	8–4	Palestine
--:-- UTC+1

=== 2011 ===
8 March 2011 Football at the 2012 Summer Olympics – Asian Qualifiers	Palestine	0–4	Iran	Zarqa, Jordan
13:30 UTC+2			Rahimi 3', 13', 55'; Karimi 31'	Stadium: Prince Mohammed Stadium; Attendance: 60; Referee: Abirami Apbai Naidu (Singapore)

10 March 2011 Football at the 2012 Summer Olympics – Asian Qualifiers	Palestine	1–1	Bahrain	Zarqa, Jordan
13:30 UTC+2	N. Owda 17'		Yaaqob 20'	Stadium: Prince Mohammed Stadium; Attendance: 50; Referee: Ri Hong-sil (North Korea)

12 March 2011 Football at the 2012 Summer Olympics – Asian Qualifiers	Jordan	6–0	Palestine	Zarqa, Jordan
18:00 UTC+2	Jbarah 3', 32'; Alnaber 6'; Al Azab 21', 51'; Al Hyasat 90+2'			Stadium: Prince Mohammed Stadium; Attendance: 200; Referee: Kim Sook-hee (South Korea)

3 October 2011 2011 WAFF Championship	Jordan	8–1	Palestine	Abu Dhabi, United Arab Emirates
14:30 UTC+4	Alnaber 28'; Jbarah 50', 55', 60', 73', 90+2'; Sweilem 82'; Al Majali 88'	Report	Hussein 26'	Stadium: Zayed bin Sultan Stadium

5 October 2011 2011 WAFF Championship	Palestine	3–0	Iraq	Abu Dhabi, United Arab Emirates
17:45 UTC+4	Salama 16' (pen.); Sohagian 60'; Walaa Hussein 61'	Report		Stadium: Zayed bin Sultan Stadium

7 October 2011 2011 WAFF Championship	Bahrain	8–0	Palestine	Abu Dhabi, United Arab Emirates
17:45 UTC+4	Abdulrahman 10'; Mohammad 18'; Alhashmi 21', 44', 65', 76'; Al Khalifa 39'; Yaaqob 69'	Report		Stadium: Zayed bin Sultan Stadium

=== 2012 ===
27 October 2012 Friendly	Palestine	2–4	United Arab Emirates	Al-Khader, Palestine
16:30 UTC+3				Stadium: Al-Khader Stadium

=== 2013 ===
1 April 2013 Friendly	Jordan	4–0	Palestine
--:-- UTC+1

3 April 2013 Friendly	Jordan	6–2	Palestine
--:-- UTC+2

21 May 2013 2014 Asian Cup qualification	Chinese Taipei	6–0	Palestine	Al-Ram, Palestine
17:00 UTC+3				Stadium: Faisal Al-Husseini International Stadium

23 May 2013 2014 Asian Cup qualification	Palestine	0–9	Myanmar	Al-Ram, Palestine
17:00 UTC+3				Stadium: Faisal Al-Husseini International Stadium

25 May 2013 2014 Asian Cup qualification	Palestine	1–1	India	Al-Ram, Palestine
17:00 UTC+3				Stadium: Faisal Al-Husseini International Stadium

=== 2014 ===
15 April 2014 2014 WAFF Championship	Palestine	4–0	Qatar	Amman, Jordan
20:00 UTC+3				Stadium: Petra Stadium

17 April 2014 2014 WAFF Championship	Bahrain	0–4	Palestine	Amman, Jordan
20:00 UTC+3				Stadium: Petra Stadium

19 April 2014 2014 WAFF Championship	Jordan	10–0	Palestine	Amman, Jordan
16:00 UTC+3				Stadium: Petra Stadium

=== 2015 ===
11 March 2015 2016 AFC Olympic Qualifying Tournament	Uzbekistan	6–0	Palestine	Amman, Jordan
12:00 UTC+2				Stadium: Petra Stadium

13 March 2015 2016 AFC Olympic Qualifying Tournament	Palestine	0–6	Jordan	Amman, Jordan
15:00 UTC+2				Stadium: Petra Stadium

15 March 2015 2016 AFC Olympic Qualifying Tournament	Hong Kong	2–2	Palestine	Amman, Jordan
12:00 UTC+2				Stadium: Petra Stadium

=== 2017 ===
3 April 2017 2018 Asian Cup qualification	Palestine	0–6	Thailand	Al-Ram, Palestine
16:00 UTC+3		Report	Kanjana 7'; Al-Sarras 19' (o.g.); Taneekarn 26'; Suchawadee 64'; Orathai 73'; Rattikan 76'	Stadium: Faisal Al-Husseini International Stadium; Attendance: 500; Referee: Kate Jacewicz (Australia)

5 April 2017 2018 Asian Cup qualification	Chinese Taipei	5–0	Palestine	Al-Ram, Palestine
16:00 UTC+3	Pao 2', 15'; Yu Hsiu-chin 6', 66', 70' (pen.)	Report		Stadium: Faisal Al-Husseini International Stadium; Attendance: 350; Referee: Cong Thi Dung (Vietnam)

=== 2018 ===
8 November 2018 2020 AFC Olympic Qualifying Tournament	Indonesia	1–1	Palestine	Al-Ram, Palestine
17:30 UTC+2	Riski 64'	Report	Sohgian 90+5'	Stadium: Faisal Al-Husseini International Stadium; Attendance: 100; Referee: Law Bik Chi (Hong Kong)

11 November 2018 2020 AFC Olympic Qualifying Tournament	Palestine	0–7	Jordan	Al-Ram, Palestine
17:30 UTC+2		Report	S. Al-Naber 21'; Al-Sufy 26', 67', 81'; Jebreen 78'; Al-Nahar 83'; Abu-Rob 88'	Stadium: Faisal Al-Husseini International Stadium; Attendance: 190; Referee: Qin Liang (China)

13 November 2018 2020 AFC Olympic Qualifying Tournament	Palestine	2–1	Maldives	Al-Ram, Palestine
17:30 UTC+2	Sohgian 69' (pen.); Kanaaneh 74'	Report	Mariyam 23'	Stadium: Faisal Al-Husseini International Stadium; Attendance: 150; Referee: Law Bik Chi (Hong Kong)

=== 2019 ===
9 January 2019 2019 WAFF Championship	Bahrain	5–0	Palestine	Muharraq, Bahrain
13:00 UTC+3	Tobellah 45+1' (pen.), 75'; Alisa 56'; Ramadhan 73'; Sabkar 79'	Report		Stadium: Sheikh Ali bin Mohammed Al Khalifa Stadium

11 January 2019 2019 WAFF Championship	United Arab Emirates	0–0	Palestine	Muharraq, Bahrain
16:00 UTC+3		Report		Stadium: Sheikh Ali bin Mohammed Al Khalifa Stadium

13 January 2019 2019 WAFF Championship	Palestine	0–3	Jordan	Muharraq, Bahrain
16:00 UTC+3		Report	Al-Nahar 16'; Hina 36', 83'	Stadium: Sheikh Ali bin Mohammed Al Khalifa Stadium

15 January 2019 2019 WAFF Championship	Palestine	0–3	Lebanon	Muharraq, Bahrain
13:00 UTC+3		Report	Tamim 7'; Jurdi 16'; Awad 23'	Stadium: Sheikh Ali bin Mohammed Al Khalifa Stadium

3 April 2019 2020 AFC Olympic Qualifying Tournament	Chinese Taipei	3–0	Palestine	Al Wakrah, Qatar
17:00 UTC+3	Zhuo Li-ping 43'; Wang Hsiang-huei 56'; Ting Chi 68'	Report		Stadium: Saoud bin Abdulrahman Stadium; Attendance: 22; Referee: Seinn Cho Aung (Myanmar)

6 April 2019 2020 AFC Olympic Qualifying Tournament	Palestine	0–9	Iran	Al Wakrah, Qatar
17:00 UTC+3		Report	Chahkandi 4'; Dabbaghi 20', 22'; Hamoudi 37', 48'; Ghomi 56', 83'; Ghanbari 67', 82'	Stadium: Saoud bin Abdulrahman Stadium; Attendance: 85; Referee: Asmita Manandhar (Nepal)

9 April 2019 2020 AFC Olympic Qualifying Tournament	Philippines	7–0	Palestine	Al Wakrah, Qatar
19:00 UTC+3	Semacio 17' (pen.); Del Campo 29'; Madarang 31', 60'; Impelido 62'; Castañeda 66', 70' (pen.)	Report		Stadium: Saoud bin Abdulrahman Stadium; Attendance: 71; Referee: Asmita Manandhar (Nepal)

=== 2021 ===
28 August 2021 2021 Arab Women's Cup	Algeria	4–1	Palestine	Cairo, Egypt
21:00 UTC+2	Benaichouche 24', 58', 86'; Bouhenni 80'		Abedrabbo 57'	Stadium: Air Defense Stadium; Referee: Shahanda Saad Al-Maghraby (Egypt)

31 August 2021 2021 Arab Women's Cup	Palestine	1–4	Jordan	Cairo, Egypt
21:00 UTC+2	Abedrabbo		Jbarah	Stadium: Air Defense Stadium; Referee: Doumouh Al Bakkar (Lebanon)

22 September 2021 2022 Asian Cup qualification	Palestine	0–2	Malaysia	Al-Ram, Palestine
15:30		Report (FIFA); Report (AFC)	A. Lee 57'; Kaur 82'	Stadium: Faisal Al-Husseini International Stadium; Attendance: 0 Referee: Esra'a Al-Mbaidin (Jordan)

25 September 2021 2022 Asian Cup qualification	Thailand	7–0	Palestine	Al-Ram, Palestine
15:30	Janista 45+2', 90+6'; Silawan 45+5', 76'; Irravadee 47', 52', 82'	Report (FIFA); Report (AFC)		Stadium: Faisal Al-Husseini International Stadium; Attendance: 0 Referee: Jhesa Kaatz (Philippines)

=== 2022 ===
29 August 2022 2022 WAFF Women's Championship	Palestine	0–3	Lebanon	Amman
17:00		Report	Fayad 10'; Maalouf 74'; Iskandar 90+2'	Stadium: Petra Stadium; Attendance: 200; Referee: Alesar Baddour (Syria)

1 September 2022 2022 WAFF Women's Championship	Syria	1–1	Palestine	Amman
17:00	Hammou 52'	Report	Abed 46'	Stadium: Petra Stadium; Attendance: 200; Referee: Ahmed Kadhim Gatea (Iraq)

4 September 2022 2022 WAFF Women's Championship	Jordan	4–0	Palestine	Amman
21:00	Jbarah 23', 59', 73'; Al Bitar 50'	Report		Stadium: Petra Stadium; Attendance: 1,000; Referee: Doumouh Al Bakkar (Lebanon)

=== 2023 ===
April 2023 2024 AFC Olympic Qualifying Tournament	Nepal	Cancelled	Palestine	TBD

April 2023 2024 AFC Olympic Qualifying Tournament	Palestine	Cancelled	Vietnam	TBD

April 2023 2024 AFC Olympic Qualifying Tournament	Palestine	Cancelled	Afghanistan	TBD

7 May 2023 Friendly	Saudi Arabia	0–0	Palestine	Jeddah, Saudi Arabia
19:00 UTC+3				Stadium: Sub-stadium of King Abdullah Sports City

11 May 2023 Friendly	Saudi Arabia	1–1	Palestine	Jeddah, Saudi Arabia
19:00 UTC+3	Mohammed 18'		Qassis 69'	Stadium: Prince Abdullah Al Faisal Stadium

18 July 2023 Friendly	Lebanon	5–0	Palestine	Ansar, Lebanon
17:30 UTC+3	Awad 23', 25'; Iskandar 58'; Fayad 82'; Maalouf 87'	Report		Stadium: Ansar Stadium

21 July 2023 Friendly	Lebanon	2–1	Palestine	Tripoli, Lebanon
17:30 UTC+3	Tamim 30', 56'	Report	Nasr 79'	Stadium: Tripoli Municipal Stadium

=== 2024 ===
20 February 2024 2024 WAFF Women's Championship	Palestine	3–0	Iraq	Jeddah, Saudi Arabia
20:00 UTC+3	Youssef 63' (pen.), 64'; Abed 69'	Report		Stadium: King Abdullah Sports City Reserve Stadium; Referee: Esraa Al-Mbaiden (Jordan)

22 February 2024 2024 WAFF Women's Championship	Syria	0–1	Palestine	Jeddah, Saudi Arabia
20:00 UTC+3		Report	Qassis 87'	Stadium: King Abdullah Sports City Reserve Stadium; Referee: Khuloud Al-Zaabi (United Arab Emirates)

24 February 2024 2024 WAFF Women's Championship	Palestine	0–4	Nepal	Jeddah, Saudi Arabia
20:00 UTC+3		Report	Bhandari 40', 78'; Poudel 59'; Rana 90+6' (pen.)	Stadium: King Abdullah Sports City Reserve Stadium; Referee: Ahmed Saad (Bahrain)

27 February 2024 WAFF Women's Championship SF	Jordan	5–0	Palestine	Jeddah, Saudi Arabia
17:00	Jbarah 27', 83'; Feras 34'; Abu Sabbah 59'; Al-Jamaeen 86' (pen.)	Report		Stadium: Prince Abdullah Al-Faisal Sports City; Referee: Ahmed Gatea (Iraq)

1 June 2024 Friendly	Bahrain	0–1	Palestine	Manama, Bahrain
18:45 UTC+3		Report	Nasr 80'	Stadium: Al Ahli Stadium; Referee: Esraa Al-Mbaiden (Jordan)

4 June 2024 Friendly	Palestine	2–1	Bahrain	Manama, Bahrain
18:45 UTC+3	Nasr 1'; Kord 62'	Report	Al-Isa 5'	Stadium: Al Ahli Stadium; Referee: Esraa Al-Mbaiden (Jordan)

29 November 2024 Friendly	Saudi Arabia	0–1	Palestine	Doha, Qatar
19:00 UTC+3			Youssef 66'	Stadium: Aspire Academy Stadium; Referee: (Qatar)

3 December 2024 Friendly	Saudi Arabia	2–0	Palestine	Doha, Qatar
19:00 UTC+3	Tawfiq 39'; Fahad 66'	Report		Stadium: Aspire Academy Stadium; Referee: Khalid Al-Shaqsi (Oman)

=== 2025 ===
29 May 2025 Friendly	Lebanon	1–1	Palestine	Beirut, Lebanon
18:00 UTC+3	Iskandar 70'	Report	Youssef 45+6'	Stadium: Champville Stadium; Referee: Alesar Baddour (Syria)

1 June 2025 Friendly	Lebanon	2–1	Palestine	Jounieh, Lebanon
17:00 UTC+3	Salha 52'; Iskandar 88'	Report	Nasr 70'	Stadium: Fouad Chehab Stadium

24 June 2025 Friendly	Uzbekistan	4–0	Palestine	Tashkent, Uzbekistan
20:00 UTC+5	Shoyimova 8'; Khabibullaeva 31'; Karachik 40'; Ergasheva 45+1'			Stadium: Do'stlik Stadion

29 June 2025 2026 Asian Cup qualification	Malaysia	1–0	Palestine	Dushanbe, Tajikistan
19:00 UTC+5	Farahiyah 86'	Report (AFC)		Stadium: Pamir Stadium; Referee: Yang Shu-ting (Chinese Taipei)

2 July 2025 2026 Asian Cup qualification	Palestine	0–10	North Korea	Dushanbe, Tajikistan
19:00 UTC+5		Report	Kim Kyong-yong 13', 45+2'; Ri Hak 27'; Chae Un-yong 29'; Myong Yu-jong 31', 45+3', 62', 88' (pen.); Kord 58' (o.g.); Kim Song-gyong 90+4'	Stadium: Pamir Stadium

5 July 2025 2026 Asian Cup qualification	Palestine	3–0	Tajikistan	Dushanbe, Tajikistan
22:00 UTC+5	Halim 49'; Youssef 69', 74'	Report		Stadium: Pamir Stadium

24 November 2025 2025 WAFF Championship GS	Palestine	0–3	Jordan	Jeddah, Saudi Arabia
16:45 UTC+3		Report	Sweilem 18'; Feras 39'; Al-Bitar 66'	Stadium: Hall Stadium – King Abdullah Sports City; Referee: Doumouh Al-Bakkar (Lebanon)

26 November 2025 2025 WAFF Championship GS	Lebanon	0–3	Palestine	Jeddah, Saudi Arabia
19:45 UTC+3		Report	Kord 11'; Sansur 23'; Qassis 56'	Stadium: Hall Stadium – King Abdullah Sports City; Referee: Alesar Baddour (Syria)

30 November 2025 2025 WAFF Championship SF	Saudi Arabia	0–0 (3–4 p)	Palestine	Jeddah, Saudi Arabia
19:45 UTC+3		Report		Stadium: Hall Stadium – King Abdullah Sports City; Attendance: 610; Referee: Said Al-Mezeini (Oman)
	Penalties
	Mukhayzin (penalty scored); Abdulrazak (penalty scored); Ibrahim (penalty missed); Tawfiq (penalty missed); Al-Omaysi (penalty scored)		(penalty scored) Youssef; (penalty scored) Asad-Halim; (penalty missed) Osorio; (penalty scored) Sabat; (penalty scored) Nasr

2 December 2025 2025 WAFF Championship F	Palestine	1–3	Jordan	Jeddah, Saudi Arabia
19:45	Youssef 85'	Report	Akroush 15'; Al-Majali 30' (pen.); F. Abu Tayeh 64'	Stadium: Prince Abdullah Al-Faisal Sports City Stadium; Referee: Said Al-Mezeini (Oman)

=== 2026 ===
6 June 2026 Friendly	Malaysia	0–2	Palestine	Amman, Jordan
18:00 UTC+2			Saavedra 60'; Asad-Halim 62'	Stadium: Petra Stadium; Referee: Esraa Al-Mbaiden (Jordan)

9 June 2026 Friendly	Jordan	1–0	Palestine	Amman, Jordan
18:00 UTC+2	Jbarah 46' (pen.)	Report		Stadium: King Abdullah Stadium

10 October 2026 Friendly	Lebanon	1–1	Palestine	Jounieh, Lebanon
14:00 UTC+3	Iskandar 79'	Report	Abu Asfar 4'	Stadium: Fouad Chehab Stadium; Referee: Doumouh Al Bakkar (Lebanon)

13 October 2026 Friendly	Lebanon	2–1	Palestine	Jounieh, Lebanon
14:00 UTC+3	Salha 26'; Maalouf 33'	Report	Al Shaikh 86'	Stadium: Fouad Chehab Stadium; Referee: Karim Chehade (Lebanon)

== Unofficial ==
15 May 2024 Non-FIFA friendly	Bohemians (Republic of Ireland)	1–2	Palestine	Dublin, Ireland
19:45 UTC+0	Malone 53'	Report	Carroll 69' (o.g.); Youssef 77'	Stadium: Dalymount Park; Attendance: 4,290

6 April 2025 Non-FIFA friendly	Vålerenga (Norway)	4–0	Palestine	Oslo, Norway
14:30 UTC+1	Preus 4', 34'; Fredø 80'; Hole-Stenerud 88'			Stadium: Intility Arena

== See also ==
- Palestine national football team results
