= Iraq women's national football team results =

The Iraq women's national football team is the representative women's association football team of Iraq. Its governing body is the Iraq Football Association (IFA) and it competes as a member of the Asian Football Confederation (AFC).

The national team's first activity was in 2010, when they participated in 2010 Arabia Women's Cup. They made their first Asian cup qualifiers appearance in 2017 when they competed in Group A alongside Jordan, Philippines, Bahrain, UAE, and Tajikistan. As of July 2022 Iraq's Women Team is yet to win their first game, due to 5 years of inactivity Iraq is unranked in the FIFA Women's World Rankings.

== Record per opponent ==
Key

Positive balance (more wins than losses)
Neutral balance (as many wins as losses)
Negative balance (more losses than wins)

The following table shows Iraq's all-time official international record per opponent:

Opponent	Pld	W	D	L	GF	GA	GD	W%	Confederation
Bahrain	2	0	0	2	0	16	−16	0	AFC
Egypt	1	0	0	1	0	15	−15	0	CAF
India	1	0	0	1	0	5	−5	0	AFC
Iran	2	0	0	2	0	15	−15	0	AFC
Jordan	4	0	0	4	0	37	−37	0	AFC
Lebanon	1	0	0	1	0	9	−34	0	AFC
Mongolia	1	1	0	0	5	2	+3	100	AFC
Nepal	1	0	0	1	0	5	−5	0	AFC
Palestine	2	0	0	2	0	6	−6	0	AFC
Philippines	1	0	0	1	0	4	−4	0	AFC
Saudi Arabia	2	0	1	1	3	4	−1	0	AFC
Syria	1	0	0	1	0	3	−3	0	AFC
Tajikistan	1	0	0	1	0	1	−1	0	AFC
Thailand	1	0	0	1	0	7	−7	0	AFC
Timor-Leste	1	0	1	0	0	0	0	0	AFC
United Arab Emirates	6	1	0	5	4	17	−13	16.67	AFC
Total	28	2	2	24	12	106	−94	7.14	—

== Results ==
Legend

Win Draw Lose Fixture

=== 2010 ===
19 October 2010 2010 Arabia Women's Cup Group B	Jordan	20–0	Iraq	Manama, Bahrain
				Stadium: Al Ahli Stadium (Bahrain)

21 October 2010 2010 Arabia Women's Cup Group B	Egypt	15–0	Iraq	Manama, Bahrain
				Stadium: Al Ahli Stadium (Bahrain)

23 October 2010 2010 Arabia Women's Cup Group B	Lebanon	9–0	Iraq	Manama, Bahrain
	Bakri ??', ??'; El Jaafil ??', ??'; Ammouri ??'; Yordanov ??'; Haidar ??', ??'; ?? ??' (o.g.)			Stadium: Al Ahli Stadium (Bahrain)

=== 2011 ===
7 May 2011 Friendly	United Arab Emirates	6–1	Iraq	Abu Dhabi, United Arab Emirates
		Report

10 May 2011 Friendly	United Arab Emirates	4–0	Iraq	Abu Dhabi, United Arab Emirates
		Report

3 October 2011 2011 WAFF Women's Championship Group A	Bahrain	12–0	Iraq	Abu Dhabi, United Arab Emirates
17:45	Alhashmi 10', 15', 27', 38', 48', 60', 90+2'; Mohammad 51'; Al Khalifa 52', 71', 84'; Abdelrahman 70'	Report		Stadium: Zayed Bin Sultan Stadium

5 October 2011 2011 WAFF Women's Championship Group A	Palestine	3–0	Iraq	Abu Dhabi, United Arab Emirates
17:45	Salama 16' (pen.); Sohagian 60'; Walaa Hussein 61'	Report		Stadium: Zayed Bin Sultan Stadium

7 October 2011 2011 WAFF Women's Championship Group A	Iraq	0–4	Jordan	Abu Dhabi, United Arab Emirates
14:30		Report	Alnaber 6'; Jbarah 21'; Alnahar 46'; Dihmis 47'	Stadium: Zayed Bin Sultan Stadium

=== 2017 ===
3 April 2017 2018 AFC Women's Asian Cup qualification Group A	Iraq	0–1	Tajikistan	Dushanbe, Tajikistan
16:00 UTC+5		Report	Halimova 87'	Stadium: Pamir Stadium; Attendance: 110; Referee: Pansa Chaisanit (Thailand)

5 April 2017 2018 AFC Women's Asian Cup qualification Group A	Philippines	4–0	Iraq	Dushanbe, Tajikistan
13:00 UTC+5	Madarang 21'; Long 44'; S. Castañeda 45+1'; Dolino 45+3'	Report		Stadium: Pamir Stadium; Attendance: 50; Referee: Anna Sidorova (Uzbekistan)

7 April 2017 2018 AFC Women's Asian Cup qualification Group A	Jordan	10–0	Iraq	Dushanbe, Tajikistan
19:00 UTC+5	Jebreen 1'; Al-Masri 20'; Al-Naber 27' (pen.), 61' (pen.), 81'; Jbarah 45+5', 65', 79', 84'; Breesam 77' (o.g.)	Report		Stadium: Pamir Stadium; Attendance: 80; Referee: Mahsa Ghorbani (Iran)

10 April 2017 2018 AFC Women's Asian Cup qualification Group A	Iraq	0–3	United Arab Emirates	Dushanbe, Tajikistan
13:00 UTC+5		Report	Taheri 17'; Faleh 78'; Rashid 87'	Stadium: Pamir Stadium; Attendance: 30; Referee: Oh Hyeon-jeong (South Korea)

12 April 2017 2018 AFC Women's Asian Cup qualification Group A	Bahrain	4–0	Iraq	Dushanbe, Tajikistan
19:00 UTC+5	Al-Hashmi 31'; Abdulrahman 41', 71'; Tobellah 80' (pen.)	Report		Stadium: Pamir Stadium; Attendance: 30; Referee: Anna Sidorova (Uzbekistan)

=== 2024 ===
8 February 2024 Friendly	United Arab Emirates	1–0	Iraq	Dubai, United Arab Emirates
21:00 UTC+4	Yocor	Report (UAEFA)		Stadium: Theyab Awana Stadium

11 February 2024 Friendly	United Arab Emirates	3–0	Iraq	Dubai, United Arab Emirates
--:-- UTC+4	Ayoka; Mané; Kai Yu	Report (UAEFA)		Stadium: Theyab Awana Stadium

20 February 2024 2024 WAFF Women's Championship	Palestine	3–0	Iraq	Jeddah, Saudi Arabia
20:00 UTC+3	Youssef 63' (pen.), 64'; Abed 69'	Report		Stadium: King Abdullah Sports City Reserve Stadium; Referee: Esraa Al-Mbaiden (Jordan)

22 February 2024 2024 WAFF Women's Championship	Iraq	0–5	Nepal	Jeddah, Saudi Arabia
17:00 UTC+3		Report	Bhandari 14', 15', 36', 43', 79'	Stadium: King Abdullah Sports City Reserve Stadium; Referee: Haneen Murad (Jordan)

24 February 2024 2024 WAFF Women's Championship	Syria	3–0	Iraq	Jeddah, Saudi Arabia
17:00 UTC+3	Elias 38'; Mustafa 49'; Khwandi 80'	Report		Stadium: King Abdullah Sports City Reserve Stadium; Referee: Doumouh Al Bakkar (Lebanon)

=== 2025 ===
10 June Friendly	Iran	8–0	Iraq	Tehran, Iran
	Zandi 20', 23'; Ghanbari 34', 45', ?'; Chatrenoor 41', ?', ?'			Stadium: National Football Center Field 2 Referee: Mahnaz Zokaee (Iran)

12 June Friendly	Iran	7–0	Iraq	Tehran, Iran
	Didar ?', ?'; Zandi ?', ?'; Alizadeh ?'; Behesht ?'; Makhdoumi ?'			Stadium: National Football Center Field 2 Referee: Fatemeh Nassiri (Iran)

23 June 2026 AFC Asian Cup qualification	Iraq	0–0	Timor-Leste	Chiang Mai, Thailand
19:30 UTC+7	Shareef (red card) 71'	Report		Stadium: 700th Anniversary Stadium; Referee: Munirah Ha Ali (Malaysia)

26 June 2026 AFC Asian Cup qualification	Iraq	5–2	Mongolia	Chiang Mai, Thailand
16:00 UTC+7	Al-Jawahiri 9', 27', 46'; Al-Ghazawi 18'; Khalaf 34'	Report	Bayanmunkh 8'; Badamkhatan 25'	Stadium: 700th Anniversary Stadium; Referee: Pak Un-jong (North Korea)

29 June 2026 AFC Asian Cup qualification	Thailand	7–0	Iraq	Chiang Mai, Thailand
19:30 UTC+7	Wiranya 13', 77', 82'; Pichayatida 36'; Panittha 45+3'; Karnjanathat 58', 65' (pen.)	Report		Stadium: 700th Anniversary Stadium; Referee: Kim Yu-jeong (South Korea)

2 July 2026 AFC Asian Cup qualification	India	5–0	Iraq	Chiang Mai, Thailand
16:00 UTC+7	Basfore 14'; Kalyan 44'; Angamuthu 48'; Phanjoubam 64'; Nongmaithem 80'	Report		Stadium: 700th Anniversary Stadium; Referee: Azusa Sugino (Japan)

24 November 2025 2025 WAFF Championship GS	Iraq	1–2	Saudi Arabia	Jeddah, Saudi Arabia
19:45 UTC+3	Al-Jawahiri 90+7'	Report	Mukhayzin 41' (pen.); Abualsamh 90+5'	Stadium: Hall Stadium – King Abdullah Sports City; Referee: Esraa Al-Mbaiden (Jordan)

26 November 2025 2025 WAFF Championship GS	United Arab Emirates	0–3	Iraq	Jeddah, Saudi Arabia
16:45 UTC+3		Report	Omar 20'; Al-Jawahiri 47'; Salihi 90+5'	Stadium: Hall Stadium – King Abdullah Sports City; Referee: Yasmin Nairoukh (Palestine)

30 November 2025 2025 WAFF Championship SF	Jordan	3–0	Iraq	Jeddah, Saudi Arabia
16:45 UTC+3	Al-Majali 54'; Abu Tayeh 84'; Al-Btoush 90+1'	Report		Stadium: Hall Stadium – King Abdullah Sports City; Referee: Mohammed Al-Manii (Oman)

2 December 2025 2025 WAFF Championship 3rd	Saudi Arabia	2–2 (2–4 p)	Iraq	Jeddah, Saudi Arabia
16:45 UTC+3	Abdullah 17'; Abdulrazak 62'	Report	Salihi 41'; Al-Balahi 53'	Stadium: Al-Faisal Stadium; Referee: Mohammed Al-Manii (Oman)
	Penalties
	Mukhayzin (penalty missed); Abdulrazak (penalty scored); Hanafi (penalty missed); Tawfiq (penalty scored)		(penalty scored) Al-Ghazawi; (penalty scored) Al-Balahi; (penalty scored) Abuzer; (penalty scored) Al-Jawahiri

== See also ==
- Iraq national football team results
