= 2025 WAFF Women's Championship =

9th edition of the WAFF Women's Championship

بطولة غرب آسيا للسيدات 2025

Tournament details
- Host country: Saudi Arabia
- City: Jeddah
- Dates: 24 November – 2 December
- Teams: 6 (from 1 sub-confederation)
- Venue: 1 (in 1 host city)

Final positions
- Champions: Jordan (7th title)
- Runners-up: Palestine
- Third place: Iraq
- Fourth place: Saudi Arabia

Tournament statistics
- Matches played: 10
- Goals scored: 33 (3.3 per match)
- Top scorer(s): (Saudi Arabia) Al-Bandari Abdullah (3 goals)
- Best player: (Jordan) Enas Al-Jamaeen
- Best goalkeeper: (Jordan) Rawned Kassap

The 2025 WAFF Women's Championship was the ninth edition of the WAFF Women's Championship, the international football tournament organised by the West Asian Football Federation (WAFF) for the women's national teams of West Asia. The tournament will be hosted by Saudi Arabia for the second time, after they had hosted the previous edition in 2024, from 24 November to 2 December.

Jordan were four-time defending champions, having won the previous four editions (2014, 2019, 2022, and 2024).

== Teams ==
=== Participating teams ===
On 16 October 2025, the WAFF announced that six countries will participate in the 2025 edition.

Country	Appearance	Previous best performance	FIFA ranking August 2025
Jordan	9th	Champions (2005, 2007, 2014, 2019, 2022, 2024)	76
United Arab Emirates	4th	Champions (2010, 2011)	117
Lebanon	6th	Runners-up (2022)	125
Palestine	8th	Runners-up (2014)	129
Saudi Arabia	2nd	Group stage (2024)	164
Iraq	3rd	Group stage (2011, 2024)	166

Did not enter

- Bahrain
- Kuwait
- Oman
- Qatar
- Syria
- Yemen

=== Draw ===
The final draw took place in Jeddah, Saudi Arabia, on 16 October 2025. As the host nation, Saudi Arabia were seeded at the top of Group A, while defending champions Jordan were placed at the top of Group B. The draw subsequently assigned the United Arab Emirates and Iraq to Group A, and Lebanon and Palestine to Group B.

=== Squads ===
Each team had to register a squad of 23 players, minimum three of whom must be goalkeepers.

== Venues ==
On 19 October 2025, the WAFF announced Jeddah as the designated host city, with one chosen venue: the Hall Stadium of the King Abdullah Sports City.

2025 WAFF Women's Championship is located in Saudi Arabia	Jeddah
2025 WAFF Women's Championship is located in Saudi Arabia	Hall Stadium – King Abdullah Sports City
2025 WAFF Women's Championship is located in Saudi Arabia	Capacity: 10,000

== Group stage ==
Tiebreakers

Teams will be ranked according to points (3 points for a win, 1 point for a draw, 0 points for a loss), and if tied on points, the following tiebreaking criteria will be applied, in the order given, to determine the rankings:

1. Points in head-to-head matches among tied teams;
2. Goal difference in head-to-head matches among tied teams;
3. Goals scored in head-to-head matches among tied teams;
4. If more than two teams are tied, and after applying all head-to-head criteria above, a subset of teams are still tied, all head-to-head criteria above are reapplied exclusively to this subset of teams;
5. Goal difference in all group matches;
6. Goals scored in all group matches;
7. Disciplinary points (yellow card = 1 point, red card as a result of two yellow cards = 3 points, direct red card = 3 points, yellow card followed by direct red card = 4 points);
8. Drawing of lots.

=== Group A ===
Pos	Team	Pld	W	D	L	GF	GA	GD	Pts	Qualification
1	Saudi Arabia (H)	2	2	0	0	7	1	+6	6	Advance to knockout phase
2	Iraq	2	1	0	1	4	2	+2	3	Advance to knockout phase
3	United Arab Emirates	2	0	0	2	0	8	−8	0	

Source: WAFF
(H) Hosts
24 November 2025
19:45

Iraq	1–2	Saudi Arabia
Al-Jawahiri 90+7'	Report	Mukhayzin 41' (pen.); Abu Al-Samh 90+5'

Hall Stadium – King Abdullah Sports City, Jeddah
Referee: Esraa Al-Mbaiden (Jordan)

26 November 2025
16:45

United Arab Emirates	0–3	Iraq
	Report	Omar 20'; Al-Jawahiri 47'; Salihi 90+5'

Hall Stadium – King Abdullah Sports City, Jeddah
Referee: Yasmin Nairoukh (Palestine)

28 November 2025
19:45

Saudi Arabia	5–0	United Arab Emirates
Abdullah 3', 10'; Abdulrazak 26'; Khalid 28'; Abu Al-Samh 43'	Report

Hall Stadium – King Abdullah Sports City, Jeddah
Referee: Mohammed Al-Manii (Oman)

=== Group B ===
Pos	Team	Pld	W	D	L	GF	GA	GD	Pts	Qualification
1	Jordan	2	2	0	0	8	0	+8	6	Advance to knockout phase
2	Palestine	2	1	0	1	3	3	0	3	Advance to knockout phase
3	Lebanon	2	0	0	2	0	8	−8	0	

Source: GSA
24 November 2025
16:45

Palestine	0–3	Jordan
	Report; Report (WAFF)	Sweilem 13'; Feras 35'; N. Phillips 66' (o.g.)

Hall Stadium – King Abdullah Sports City, Jeddah
Referee: Doumouh Al-Bakkar (Lebanon)

26 November 2025
19:45

Lebanon	0–3	Palestine
	Report	Kord 11'; Osorio 23'; Qassis 56'

Hall Stadium – King Abdullah Sports City, Jeddah
Referee: Alesar Baddour (Syria)

28 November 2025
16:45

Jordan	5–0	Lebanon
Sweilem 17'; Tamimi 29'; Al-Fararjeh 38'; Arabi 43' (o.g.); M. Abu Tayeh 54'	Report

Hall Stadium – King Abdullah Sports City, Jeddah
Referee: Rawdha Al-Mansoori (United Arab Emirates)

== Knockout stage ==
=== Bracket ===
Semi-finals
30 November – Jeddah (KA)
Saudi Arabia	0 (3)
Palestine (p)	0 (4)
30 November – Jeddah (KA)
Jordan	3
Iraq	0

Final
2 December – Jeddah (PA)
Palestine	1
Jordan	3
Third place
2 December – Jeddah (PA)
Saudi Arabia	2 (2)
Iraq (p)	2 (4)

=== Semi-finals ===
30 November 2025
16:45

Jordan	3–0	Iraq
Al-Majali 54'; M. Abu Tayeh 84'; Al-Btoush 90+1'	Report

Hall Stadium – King Abdullah Sports City, Jeddah
Referee: Mohammed Al-Manii (Oman)

30 November 2025
19:45

Saudi Arabia	0–0	Palestine
	Report
Penalties
Mukhayzin (penalty scored); Abdulrazak (penalty scored); Ibrahim (penalty missed); Tawfiq (penalty missed); Al-Omaysi (penalty scored)	3–4	(penalty scored) Youssef; (penalty scored) Asad-Halim; (penalty missed) Osorio; (penalty scored) Sabat; (penalty scored) Nasr

Hall Stadium – King Abdullah Sports City, Jeddah
Attendance: 610
Referee: Said Al-Mezeini (Oman)

=== Third place play-off ===
2 December 2025
16:45

Saudi Arabia	2–2	Iraq
Abdullah 17'; Abdulrazak 62'	Report	Salihi 41'; Al-Balahi 53'
Penalties
Mukhayzin (penalty missed); Abdulrazak (penalty scored); Hanafi (penalty missed); Tawfiq (penalty scored)	2–4	(penalty scored) Al-Ghazawi; (penalty scored) Al-Balahi; (penalty scored) Abuzer; (penalty scored) Al-Jawahiri

Prince Abdullah Al-Faisal Sports City Stadium, Jeddah
Referee: Mohammed Al-Manii (Oman)

=== Final ===
2 December 2025
19:45

Palestine	1–3	Jordan
Youssef 85'	Report	Akroush 14'; Al-Majali 31' (pen.); F. Abu Tayeh 64'

Prince Abdullah Al-Faisal Sports City Stadium, Jeddah
Referee: Said Al-Mezeini (Oman)

Palestine	Jordan

GK	23	Sharlot Phillips
DF	4	Sireen Ghattas (C)
FW	2	Rina Osorio
DF	3	Sara Kord	(yellow card) 89'
DF	6	Ahlam-Laila Nasr
MF	10	Laila Al-Shaikh		(substituted off) HT'
FW	11	Nour Youssef
FW	12	Dalia Asad-Halim		(substituted off) 90+2'
MF	15	Miral Qassis		(substituted off) 67'
FW	17	Nadine Mohamed		(substituted off) 67'
FW	22	Narin Abu Asfar		(substituted off) 90+2'
Substitutions:
FW	9	Naomi Phillips		(substituted on) HT'
MF	7	Jeniver Shattara		(substituted on) 67'
FW	8	Florencia Sabat		(substituted on) 67'
MF	5	Sara Al-Shakhshir		(substituted on) 90+2'
MF	21	Annasoraya Khoury		(substituted on) 90+2'
Head coach:
Ahmed Sharf

GK	12	Rawned Kassap
DF	19	Ayah Al-Majali (C)
MF	5	Marah Abu Tayeh
MF	6	Celine Akroush	(substituted off) 76'
DF	7	Farah Abu Tayeh	(substituted off) 90+3'
MF	8	Enas Al-Jamaeen
FW	9	Bana Al-Bitar	(substituted off) 90+3'
FW	10	Roukayah Al-Fararjeh	(substituted off) 67'
FW	15	Mai Sweilem	(substituted off) 67'
DF	20	Lana Feras
DF	21	Rand Abu-Hussein
Substitutions:
FW	11	Jinan Said	(substituted on) 67'
FW	17	Ida Tamimi	(substituted on) 67'
MF	2	Taqi Al-Zabrey	(substituted on) 76'
MF	14	Yasmeen Al-Ajrab	(substituted on) 90+3'
MF	18	Tahreer Al-Qawasmeh	(substituted on) 90+3'
Head coach:
(Cape Verde) David Nascimento

Assistant referees:
Karrar Abbas (Iraq)
Jana Haydar (Lebanon)
Fourth official:
Mohammed Al-Manii (Oman)

== Goal scorers ==
There were 33 goals scored in 10 matches, for an average of 3.3 goals per match.

3 goals

- (Saudi Arabia) Al-Bandari Abdullah

2 goals

- (Iraq) Nur Al-Jawahiri
- (Iraq) Shokhan Salihi
- (Jordan) Marah Abu Tayeh
- (Jordan) Ayah Al-Majali
- (Jordan) Mai Sweilem
- (Saudi Arabia) Lana Abdulrazak
- (Saudi Arabia) Ameera Abu Al-Samh

1 goal

- (Iraq) Nadia Al-Balahi
- (Iraq) Mina Omar
- (Jordan) Farah Abu Tayeh
- (Jordan) Celine Akroush
- (Jordan) Bana Al-Bitar
- (Jordan) Leen Al-Btoush
- (Jordan) Roukayah Al Fararjeh
- (Jordan) Lana Feras
- (Jordan) Ida Tamimi
- (Palestine) Sara Kord
- (Palestine) Rina Osorio
- (Palestine) Miral Qassis
- (Palestine) Nour Youssef
- (Saudi Arabia) Fadwa Khalid
- (Saudi Arabia) Raghad Mukhayzin

1 own goal

- (Lebanon) Zahwa Arabi (against Jordan)

Source: WAFF
