= Sara Didar =

Iranian footballer (born November 27th, 2004)

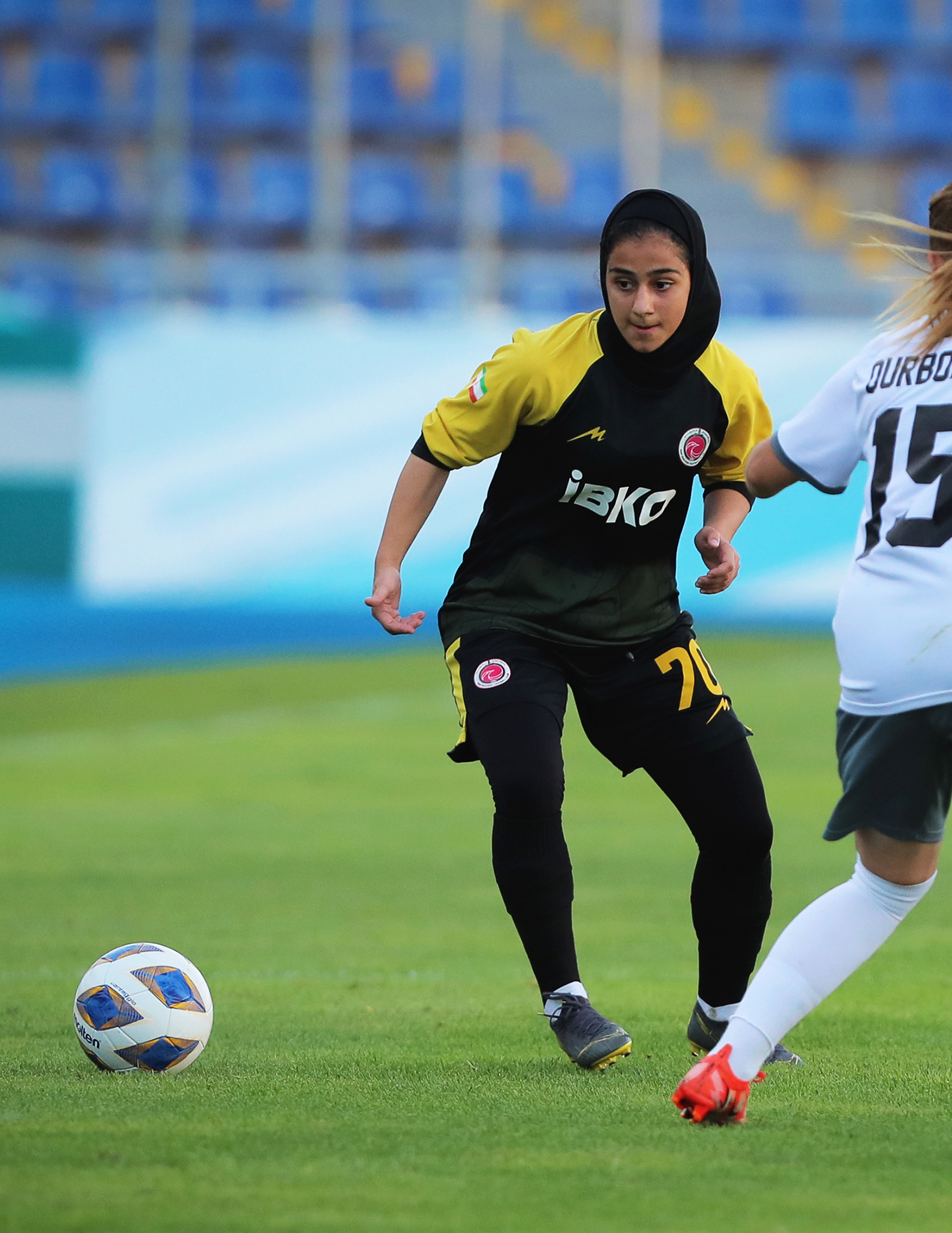
- Sara Didar playing for Bam Khatoon F.C in the AFC Women's Club Championship

Personal information
- Full name: Sara Didar
- Date of birth: 27 November 2004 (age 21)
- Place of birth: Nishapur, Iran
- Position: Forward

Team information
- Current team: Bam Khatoon FC
- Number: 70

Senior career*
| Years | Team | Apps | (Gls) |
- Bam Khatoon FC

International career
| 2021 | Iran | | |
- * Club domestic league appearances and goals

Sara Didar (Persian: سارا دیدار; born 27 November 2004) is an Iranian footballer who plays as a forward for Kowsar Women Football League club Bam Khatoon FC and the Iran national team.

== International career ==
She plays for the Iran national team since 2020.

== International goals ==
| No. | Date | Venue | Opponent | Score | Result | Competition |
|---|---|---|---|---|---|---|
| 1. | 12 June 2025 | National Football Center Field 2, Tehran, Iran | Iraq | ?–0 | 7–0 | Friendly |
| 2. | 12 June 2025 | National Football Center Field 2, Tehran, Iran | Iraq | ?–0 | 7–0 | Friendly |
| 3. | 10 July 2025 | King Abdullah II Stadium, Amman, Jordan | Singapore | 2–0 | 4–0 | 2026 AFC Women's Asian Cup qualification |
| 4. | 19 July 2025 | King Abdullah II Stadium, Amman, Jordan | Jordan | 1–0 | 2–1 | 2026 AFC Women's Asian Cup qualification |
| 5. | 21 October 2025 | Jawaharlal Nehru Stadium, Shillong, India | India | 1–0 | 2–0 | Friendly |
| 6. | 21 October 2025 | Jawaharlal Nehru Stadium, Shillong, India | India | 2–0 | 2–0 | Friendly |
| 7. | 24 October 2025 | Jawaharlal Nehru Stadium, Shillong, India | Nepal | 1–0 | 3–0 | Friendly |
