= 2026 AFC Women's Asian Cup qualification =

Tournament details
- Host countries: Jordan (Group A); Thailand (Group B); Myanmar (Group C); Indonesia (Group D); Vietnam (Group E); Uzbekistan (Group F); Cambodia (Group G); Tajikistan (Group H)
- Dates: 23 June – 5 July 2025; 7–19 July 2025 (Group A)
- Teams: 34 (from 1 confederation)
- Venues: 8 (in 8 host cities)

Tournament statistics
- Matches played: 56
- Goals scored: 267 (4.77 per match)
- Top scorer(s): (Nepal) Sabitra Bhandari (North Korea) Kim Kyong-yong (9 goals each)

The 2026 AFC Women's Asian Cup qualification was an association football qualification tournament for the 2026 AFC Women's Asian Cup.

The qualification tournament decided eight of the twelve participating teams in the final tournament to be held in Australia. Along with the host nation, the top three teams in the 2022 AFC Women's Asian Cup final tournament also secured automatic qualification: China, South Korea and Japan. A total of 34 teams submitted entries to participate in the qualifiers.

This tournament served as the first stage of Asian qualification for the 2027 FIFA Women's World Cup and the 2028 Olympic football tournament.

The teams were divided into eight groups, with group winners qualifying to the final tournament.

== Draw ==
The draw took place on 27 March 2025, 15:00 MST (UTC+8), at the AFC House in Kuala Lumpur.

For the first time in the tournament's history, the seeding for both qualifiers and final draws is based on the latest FIFA Women's World Ranking at the time of the draw. Previously, the teams were seeded according to their performance in the previous final tournament and qualification rankings.

On 26 February 2025, the AFC confirmed the eight associations that had expressed their intent to host qualification groups ahead of the draw. The qualifying tournament originally was to feature eight groups, with one group comprising five teams, while the remaining seven groups would each consist of four teams. On 2 March 2025, FIFA lifted the suspension of the Pakistan Football Federation, clearing the way for Pakistan to enter qualification. As a result, 34 teams entered qualification and were drawn into two groups of five teams and six groups of four.

Automatically qualified for final tournament and not participating in qualification
1. **Australia** (16) (as final tournament hosts); 2. **Japan** (5); 3. **China** (17); 4. **South Korea** (19)
Participating in qualification
Pot 1	Pot 2	Pot 3	Pot 4	Pot 5
5. **North Korea** (9); 6. **Vietnam** **(H)** (37); 7. **Philippines** (41); 8. **Chinese Taipei** (42); 9. Thailand **(H)** (47); 10. **Uzbekistan** **(H)** (50); 11. Myanmar **(H)** (55); 12. **Iran** (68)	13. **India** (69); 14. Jordan **(H)** (74); 15. Hong Kong (80); 16. Bahrain (92); 17. Indonesia **(H)** (94); 18. Guam (96); 19. Nepal (99); 20. Malaysia (102)	21. Laos (107); 22. United Arab Emirates (112); 23. Cambodia **(H)** (118); 24. Mongolia (126); 25. Lebanon (131); 26. **Bangladesh** (133); 27. Kyrgyzstan (135); 28. Palestine (136)	29. Singapore (139); 30. Turkmenistan (141); 31. Tajikistan **(H)** (155); 32. Pakistan (157); 33. Sri Lanka (158); 34. Timor-Leste (159); 35. Maldives (163); 36. Saudi Arabia (166)	37. Bhutan (171); 38. Iraq (173)

Notes

- Teams in **bold** qualified for the final tournament.
- (H): Qualification group hosts determined before the draw. These teams were taken from their respective pots and placed in a separate Host Pot, and could not be drawn in the same group.

Did not enter

- Syria (161)
- Macau (175)
- Afghanistan (NR)
- Kuwait (NR)
- Qatar (NR)
- Northern Mariana Islands (N/A) (Note: The Northern Mariana Islands Football Association is not affiliated with FIFA)
- Brunei (Note: Country does not field a women's national team.)
- Oman
- Yemen

=== Draw result ===
The draw resulted in following groups.

Group A
Pos	Team
A1	Iran
A2	Jordan **(H)**
A3	Lebanon
A4	Singapore
A5	Bhutan

Group B
Pos	Team
B1	Thailand **(H)**
B2	India
B3	Mongolia
B4	Timor-Leste
B5	Iraq

Group C
Pos	Team
C1	Myanmar **(H)**
C2	Bahrain
C3	Bangladesh
C4	Turkmenistan

Group D
Pos	Team
D1	Chinese Taipei
D2	Indonesia **(H)**
D3	Kyrgyzstan
D4	Pakistan

Group E
Pos	Team
E1	Vietnam **(H)**
E2	Guam
E3	United Arab Emirates
E4	Maldives

Group F
Pos	Team
F1	Uzbekistan **(H)**
F2	Nepal
F3	Laos
F4	Sri Lanka

Group G
Pos	Team
G1	Philippines
G2	Hong Kong
G3	Cambodia **(H)**
G4	Saudi Arabia

Group H
Pos	Team
H1	North Korea
H2	Malaysia
H3	Palestine
H4	Tajikistan **(H)**

Notes

(H): Qualification group hosts

== Format and schedule ==
=== Schedule ===
The matches were played during the windows of 23 June – 5 July and 7–19 July 2025.

Competition schedule
Matchday	Group A	Group B	Groups C, D, E, F, G, H
Matchday 1	7 July 2025	23 June 2025	29 June 2025
Matchday 2	10 July 2025	26 June 2025	2 July 2025
Matchday 3	13 July 2025	29 June 2025	5 July 2025
Matchday 4	16 July 2025	2 July 2025	
Matchday 5	19 July 2025	5 July 2025	

=== Qualification tiebreakers ===
Tiebreakers

Teams are ranked according to points (3 points for a win, 1 point for a draw, 0 points for a loss), and if tied on points, the following tiebreaking criteria are applied, in the order given, to determine the rankings (Regulations Article 7.2.2):

1. Points in head-to-head matches among participating teams;
2. Goal difference in head-to-head matches among participating teams;
3. Goals scored in head-to-head matches among participating teams;
4. If more than two teams are tied, and after applying all head-to-head criteria above, a subset of teams are still tied, all head-to-head criteria above are reapplied exclusively to the matches between the participating teams,
5. Goal difference from all group matches;
6. Goals scored from all group matches;
7. Penalty shoot-out if only two teams are tied and they met in the last round of the group;
8. Disciplinary points (yellow card = 1 point, red card as a result of two yellow cards = 3 points, direct red card = 3 points, yellow card followed by direct red card = 4 points);
9. Drawing of lots.

== Groups ==
=== Group A ===
- All matches were held in Jordan. (Note: Group A's matches were originally scheduled to take place from 23 June to 5 July 2025. However, the AFC postponed the matches due to the ongoing Twelve-Day War.)
- Times listed are UTC+3.

Pos	Team	Pld	W	D	L	GF	GA	GD	Pts	Qualification
1	Iran	4	3	0	1	14	5	+9	9 (Note: Head-to-head points: Iran 3, Jordan 0.)	Final tournament
2	Jordan (H)	4	3	0	1	13	2	+11	9	
3	Bhutan	4	2	0	2	6	13	−7	6 (Note: Head-to-head points: Bhutan 3, Lebanon 0.)	
4	Lebanon	4	2	0	2	5	7	−2	6	
5	Singapore	4	0	0	4	2	13	−11	0	

Source: AFC
Rules for classification: Qualification tiebreakers
(H) Hosts
Notes:
7 July 2025
16:00

Bhutan	3–2	Singapore
Bidha 1'; Edon 67'; Rai 87'	Report	Ganeswaran 10'; Wangmo 26' (o.g.)

King Abdullah II Stadium, Amman
Referee: Keomany Phengmeuangkhoun (Laos)
7 July 2025
19:00

Lebanon	0–4	Jordan
	Report	Jbarah 8', 20'; Al-Bitar 32'; Abu Tayeh 77'

King Abdullah II Stadium, Amman
Referee: Rebecca Durcau (Australia)

10 July 2025
16:00

Singapore	0–4	Iran
	Report	Shaban 18', 77'; Didar 47'; Ghanbari 86'

King Abdullah II Stadium, Amman
Referee: Khuloud Al Zaabi (United Arab Emirates)
10 July 2025
19:00

Bhutan	2–1	Lebanon
Tshering 45+2', 86'	Report	Khoury 81'

King Abdullah II Stadium, Amman
Referee: Supiree Testhomya (Thailand)

13 July 2025
16:00

Iran	7–1	Bhutan
Alizadeh 3'; Shaban 6', 10'; Zandi 38'; Ghanbari 81'; Zolfi 83'; Tamrian 85'	Report	Lhazom 12'

King Abdullah II Stadium, Amman
Referee: Lê Thị Ly (Vietnam)
13 July 2025
19:00

Jordan	5–0	Singapore
Jbarah 9', 64'; Al-Bitar 43'; Al-Jamaeen 66'; Sweilem 84'	Report

King Abdullah II Stadium, Amman
Referee: Plong Pich Akara (Cambodia)

16 July 2025
16:00

Lebanon	3–1	Iran
Maalouf 5', 22', 71'	Report	Shaban 57'

King Abdullah II Stadium, Amman
Referee: Plong Pich Akara (Cambodia)
16 July 2025
19:00

Jordan	3–0	Bhutan
Jbarah 4'; Al-Majali 39' (pen.); Akroush 79'	Report

King Abdullah II Stadium, Amman
Referee: Rebecca Durcau (Australia)

19 July 2025
16:00

Singapore	0–1	Lebanon
	Report	Iskandar 64'

King Abdullah II Stadium, Amman
Referee: Supiree Testhomya (Thailand)
19 July 2025
19:00

Iran	2–1	Jordan
Didar 47'; Zandi 81'	Report	Amineh 88' (o.g.)

King Abdullah II Stadium, Amman
Referee: Lê Thị Ly (Vietnam)

=== Group B ===
- All matches were held in Thailand.
- Times listed are UTC+7.

Pos	Team	Pld	W	D	L	GF	GA	GD	Pts	Qualification
1	India	4	4	0	0	24	1	+23	12	Final tournament
2	Thailand (H)	4	3	0	1	23	2	+21	9	
3	Timor-Leste	4	1	1	2	3	9	−6	4	
4	Iraq	4	1	1	2	5	14	−9	4	
5	Mongolia	4	0	0	4	3	32	−29	0	

Source: AFC
Rules for classification: Qualification tiebreakers
(H) Hosts
23 June 2025
16:00

Mongolia	0–13	India
	Report	Basfore 8'; Guguloth 20', 59'; Xaxa 29', 45', 46', 52', 55'; Haldar 67'; Prasad 71'; Selladurai 73', 86'; Dangmei 75' (pen.)

700th Anniversary Stadium, Chiang Mai
Referee: Jon Sol-mi (North Korea)
23 June 2025
19:30

Iraq	0–0	Timor-Leste
	Report

700th Anniversary Stadium, Chiang Mai
Referee: Munirah Ha Ali (Malaysia)

26 June 2025
16:00

Iraq	5–2	Mongolia
Al-Jawahiri 9', 27', 46'; Al-Ghazawi 18'; Khalaf 34'	Report	Bayanmunkh 8'; Badamkhatan 25'

700th Anniversary Stadium, Chiang Mai
Referee: Pak Un-jong (North Korea)
26 June 2025
19:30

Timor-Leste	0–4	Thailand
	Report	Saowalak 6', 31', 45'; Ploychompoo 90+2'

700th Anniversary Stadium, Chiang Mai
Referee: Azusa Sugino (Japan)

29 June 2025
16:00

India	4–0	Timor-Leste
Kalyan 12', 80'; Tamang 58'; Kom 85'	Report

700th Anniversary Stadium, Chiang Mai
Referee: Doumouh Al-Bakkar (Lebanon)
29 June 2025
19:30

Thailand	7–0	Iraq
Wiranya 13', 77', 82'; Pichayatida 36'; Panittha 45+3'; Karnjanathat 58', 65' (pen.)	Report

700th Anniversary Stadium, Chiang Mai
Referee: Kim Yu-jeong (South Korea)

2 July 2025
16:00

India	5–0	Iraq
Basfore 14'; Kalyan 44'; Angamuthu 48'; Phanjoubam 64'; Nongmaithem 80'	Report

700th Anniversary Stadium, Chiang Mai
Referee: Azusa Sugino (Japan)
2 July 2025
19:30

Mongolia	0–11	Thailand
	Report	Thawanrat 3', 90+2'; Saowalak 4'; Thanchanok 12', 45+1'; Pattaranan 29', 52', 79'; Karnjanathat 49' (pen.), 66', 90+3'

700th Anniversary Stadium, Chiang Mai
Referee: Nurul Ain Izatty (Malaysia)

5 July 2025
16:00

Timor-Leste	3–1	Mongolia
V. Fernandes 29'; Da Conceição 56'; D. Costa 62'	Report	B. da Costa 11' (o.g.)

700th Anniversary Stadium, Chiang Mai
Referee: Doumouh Al-Bakkar (Lebanon)
5 July 2025
19:30

Thailand	1–2	India
Chatchawan 47'	Report	Basfore 29', 74'

700th Anniversary Stadium, Chiang Mai
Referee: Kim Yu-jeong (South Korea)

=== Group C ===
- All matches were held in Myanmar.
- Times listed are UTC+6:30.

Pos	Team	Pld	W	D	L	GF	GA	GD	Pts	Qualification
1	Bangladesh	3	3	0	0	16	1	+15	9	Final tournament
2	Myanmar (H)	3	2	0	1	15	2	+13	6	
3	Bahrain	3	0	1	2	2	15	−13	1	
4	Turkmenistan	3	0	1	2	2	17	−15	1	

Source: AFC
Rules for classification: Qualification tiebreakers
(H) Hosts
29 June 2025
16:00

Myanmar	8–0	Turkmenistan
Win Win 11', 28', 38'; Khin Mo Mo Tun 45', 76'; San Thaw Thaw 48'; May Htet Lu 52'; Tun Shwe Yee 90+4'	Report

Thuwunna Stadium, Yangon
Referee: Mu Mingxin (China)
29 June 2025
19:00

Bahrain	0–7	Bangladesh
	Report	Shamsunnahar Jr. 10'; R. Chakma 15'; Kisku 40'; Khatun 45+2', 45+3'; Al-Ali 59' (o.g.); Akhter 74'

Thuwunna Stadium, Yangon
Referee: Kanika Barman (India)

2 July 2025
16:00

Bangladesh	2–1	Myanmar
R. Chakma 19', 70'	Report	Win Win 89'

Thuwunna Stadium, Yangon
Referee: Esraa Almbaiden (Jordan)
2 July 2025
19:00

Turkmenistan	2–2	Bahrain
Çaryýewa 84'; Alymjanowa 89'	Report	Sabkar 87'; Al-Isa 90+6'

Thuwunna Stadium, Yangon
Referee: Choki Om (Bhutan)

5 July 2025
16:00

Myanmar	6–0	Bahrain
Shwe Yee Tun 40', 42'; Khin Mo Mo Tun 45+5'; Win Theingi Tun 53'; May Htet Lu 58'; Win Win 73'	Report

Thuwunna Stadium, Yangon
Referee: Supiree Testhomya (Thailand)
5 July 2025
19:00

Bangladesh	7–0	Turkmenistan
Rani 4'; Shamsunnahar Jr. 6', 13'; M. Chakma 16'; R. Chakma 17', 41'; Khatun 20'	Report

Thuwunna Stadium, Yangon
Referee: Mu Mingxin (China)

=== Group D ===
- All matches were held in Indonesia.
- Times listed are UTC+7.

Pos	Team	Pld	W	D	L	GF	GA	GD	Pts	Qualification
1	Chinese Taipei	3	3	0	0	13	1	+12	9	Final tournament
2	Pakistan	3	2	0	1	4	9	−5	6	
3	Indonesia (H)	3	1	0	2	2	4	−2	3	
4	Kyrgyzstan	3	0	0	3	1	6	−5	0	

Source: AFC
Rules for classification: Qualification tiebreakers
(H) Hosts
29 June 2025
15:30

Chinese Taipei	8–0	Pakistan
Pu Hsin-hui 14', 86'; Chen Jin-wen 16'; Su Yu-hsuan 40'; Hsu Yi-yun 66'; Liu Yu-chiao 88'; He Jia-shiuan 90+1', 90+2'	Report

Kelapa Dua Sports Centre Stadium, Tangerang
Referee: Cha Min-ji (South Korea)
29 June 2025
20:00

Indonesia	1–0	Kyrgyzstan
Warps 66'	Report

Kelapa Dua Sports Centre Stadium, Tangerang
Referee: Casey Reibelt (Australia)

2 July 2025
15:30

Kyrgyzstan	0–3	Chinese Taipei
	Report	Su Sin-yun 45'; Su Yu-hsuan 65'; Matsunaga 70' (pen.)

Kelapa Dua Sports Centre Stadium, Tangerang
Referee: Ranjita Devi Tekcham (India)
2 July 2025
20:00

Pakistan	2–0	Indonesia
Nadia 8'; Hirani 19' (pen.)	Report

Kelapa Dua Sports Centre Stadium, Tangerang
Referee: Haruna Kanematsu (Japan)

5 July 2025
15:30

Kyrgyzstan	1–2	Pakistan
Gaparova 69'	Report	Mahmood 4', 26' (pen.)

Kelapa Dua Sports Centre Stadium, Tangerang
Referee: Yu Hong (China)
5 July 2025
20:00

Chinese Taipei	2–1	Indonesia
Su Yu-hsuan 15'; Liu Yu-chiao 75'	Report	Helsya 48'

Kelapa Dua Sports Centre Stadium, Tangerang
Referee: Casey Reibelt (Australia)

=== Group E ===
- All matches were held in Vietnam.
- Times listed are UTC+7.

Pos	Team	Pld	W	D	L	GF	GA	GD	Pts	Qualification
1	Vietnam (H)	3	3	0	0	17	0	+17	9	Final tournament
2	United Arab Emirates	3	1	1	1	5	6	−1	4	
3	Guam	3	1	1	1	3	4	−1	4	
4	Maldives	3	0	0	3	0	15	−15	0	

Source: AFC
Rules for classification: Qualification tiebreakers
(H) Hosts
29 June 2025
16:00

Guam	0–0	United Arab Emirates
	Report

Việt Trì Stadium, Phú Thọ
Referee: Pansa Chaisanit (Thailand)
29 June 2025
19:00

Vietnam	7–0	Maldives
Ngân Thị Vạn Sự 7', 11'; Nguyễn Thị Bích Thùy 14'; Nguyễn Thị Vạn 25'; Nguyễn Thị Mỹ Anh 30'; Ngọc Minh Chuyên 44'; Phạm Hải Yến 67'	Report

Việt Trì Stadium, Phú Thọ
Referee: Dong Fangyu (China)

2 July 2025
16:00

Maldives	0–3	Guam
	Report	Bartosh 45', 56', 75'

Việt Trì Stadium, Phú Thọ
Referee: Haneen Murad (Jordan)
2 July 2025
19:00

United Arab Emirates	0–6	Vietnam
	Report	Chương Thị Kiều 11'; Thái Thị Thảo 14'; Nguyễn Thị Vạn 43', 51'; Phạm Hải Yến 64'; Ngân Thị Vạn Sự 90+4'

Việt Trì Stadium, Phú Thọ
Referee: Dong Fangyu (China)

5 July 2025
16:00

United Arab Emirates	5–0	Maldives
Al-Zaabi 28', 45+4', 47'; Al-Hosani 68'; Al-Hazmi 90+1'	Report

Việt Trì Stadium, Phú Thọ
Referee: Anjana Rai (Nepal)
5 July 2025
19:00

Vietnam	4–0	Guam
Nguyễn Thị Vạn 1'; Nguyễn Thị Bích Thùy 13', 25'; Phạm Hải Yến 73'	Report

Việt Trì Stadium, Phú Thọ
Referee: Alesar Baddour (Syria)

=== Group F ===
- All matches were held in Uzbekistan.
- Times listed are UTC+5.

Pos	Team	Pld	W	D	L	GF	GA	GD	Pts	Qualification
1	Uzbekistan (H)	3	2	1	0	20	3	+17	7 (Note: Nepal and Uzbekistan were level on goal difference and goals scored. A penalty shoot-out was used to determine the final ranking.)	Final tournament
2	Nepal	3	2	1	0	20	3	+17	7	
3	Laos	3	1	0	2	2	16	−14	3	
4	Sri Lanka	3	0	0	3	0	20	−20	0	

Source: AFC
Rules for classification: Qualification tiebreakers
(H) Hosts
Notes:
29 June 2025
17:30

Nepal	9–0	Laos
Basnet 12', 83'; Bhandari 45', 55', 74', 79'; Limbu 47'; Ghising 57'; Inthaphone 88' (o.g.)	Report

Milliy Stadium, Tashkent
Referee: Wint War Tun (Myanmar)
29 June 2025
20:30

Uzbekistan	10–0	Sri Lanka
Kudratova 3', 7', 52', 73'; Karachik 18', 20'; Khabibullaeva 31', 87', 88'; Shoyimova 68'	Report

Milliy Stadium, Tashkent
Referee: Asaka Koizumi (Japan)

2 July 2025
17:30

Sri Lanka	0–8	Nepal
	Report	G. Rana 7', 55'; Bhandari 14', 36', 40'; Thokar 62'; Poudel 78'; P. Rana 89'

Milliy Stadium, Tashkent
Referee: Wang Chieh (Chinese Taipei)
2 July 2025
20:30

Laos	0–7	Uzbekistan
	Report	Khabibullaeva 23'; Zoirova 34'; Kudratova 48', 90+3'; Shoyimova 81', 90+2'; Aminjonova 85'

Milliy Stadium, Tashkent
Referee: Bùi Thị Thu Trang (Vietnam)

5 July 2025
17:30

Laos	2–0	Sri Lanka
Anuradhini 72' (o.g.); Inthaphone 90+2'	Report

Milliy Stadium, Tashkent
Referee: Park Se-jin (South Korea)
5 July 2025
20:30

Uzbekistan	3–3	Nepal
Khabibullaeva 2'; Ghimire 11' (o.g.); Shoyimova 39' (pen.)	Report	Bhandari 24', 73'; Rana 71'
Penalties
Shoyimova (penalty scored); Zoirova (penalty scored); Khikmatova (penalty scored); Aminjonova (penalty scored)	4–2	(penalty missed) Bhandari; (penalty scored) Rana; (penalty scored) S. Magar; (penalty missed) A. Magar

Milliy Stadium, Tashkent
Referee: Asaka Koizumi (Japan)

=== Group G ===
- All matches were held in Cambodia.
- Times listed are UTC+7.

Pos	Team	Pld	W	D	L	GF	GA	GD	Pts	Qualification
1	Philippines	3	3	0	0	10	0	+10	9	Final tournament
2	Hong Kong	3	1	1	1	2	2	0	4	
3	Cambodia (H)	3	1	1	1	3	8	−5	4	
4	Saudi Arabia	3	0	0	3	1	6	−5	0	

Source: AFC
Rules for classification: Qualification tiebreakers
(H) Hosts
29 June 2025
16:00

Philippines	3–0	Saudi Arabia
Sawicki 16'; Serrano 55'; Pino 81'	Report

Olympic Stadium, Phnom Penh
Referee: Sunita Thongthawin (Thailand)
29 June 2025
19:00

Hong Kong	1–1	Cambodia
Leung Hong Kiu 31' (pen.)	Report	Sothan 82'

Olympic Stadium, Phnom Penh
Referee: Veronika Bernatskaia (Kyrgyzstan)

2 July 2025
16:00

Saudi Arabia	0–1	Hong Kong
	Report	Tsang Lai Mae 62'

Olympic Stadium, Phnom Penh
Referee: Nodira Mirzoeva (Tajikistan)
2 July 2025
19:00

Cambodia	0–6	Philippines
	Report	Pino 18'; Serrano 19', 36'; Nimol 40' (o.g.); Long 48'; C. McDaniel 56'

Olympic Stadium, Phnom Penh
Referee: Oh Hyeon-jeong (South Korea)

5 July 2025
16:00

Philippines	1–0	Hong Kong
C. McDaniel 4'	Report

Olympic Stadium, Phnom Penh
Referee: Lê Thị Ly (Vietnam)
5 July 2025
19:00

Cambodia	2–1	Saudi Arabia
Sovanmony 84'; Serysitha 90+5'	Report	Al-Angari 79'

Olympic Stadium, Phnom Penh
Referee: Veronika Bernatskaia (Kyrgyzstan)

=== Group H ===
- All matches were held in Tajikistan.
- Times listed are UTC+5.

Pos	Team	Pld	W	D	L	GF	GA	GD	Pts	Qualification
1	North Korea	3	3	0	0	26	0	+26	9	Final tournament
2	Malaysia	3	2	0	1	2	6	−4	6	
3	Palestine	3	1	0	2	3	11	−8	3	
4	Tajikistan (H)	3	0	0	3	0	14	−14	0	

Source: AFC
Rules for classification: Qualification tiebreakers
(H) Hosts
29 June 2025
19:00

Malaysia	1–0	Palestine
Farahiyah 86'	Report

Pamir Stadium, Dushanbe
Referee: Yang Shu-ting (Chinese Taipei)
29 June 2025
22:00

North Korea	10–0	Tajikistan
Kim Kyong-yong 9', 39', 41', 45+4' (pen.); Myong Yu-jong 23'; Hong Song-ok 26'; Ri Hak 28', 36'; Han Jin-hong 54'; Kim Song-gyong 62' (pen.)	Report

Pamir Stadium, Dushanbe
Referee: Rawdha Almansoori (United Arab Emirates)

2 July 2025
19:00

Palestine	0–10	North Korea
	Report	Kim Kyong-yong 13', 45+2'; Ri Hak 27'; Chae Un-yong 29'; Myong Yu-jong 31', 45+3', 62', 88' (pen.); Kord 58' (o.g.); Kim Song-gyong 90+4'

Pamir Stadium, Dushanbe
Referee: Roziyabonu Yusupova (Uzbekistan)
2 July 2025
22:00

Tajikistan	0–1	Malaysia
	Report	Henrietta 90+2'

Pamir Stadium, Dushanbe
Referee: Trần Thị Thanh (Vietnam)

5 July 2025
19:00

North Korea	6–0	Malaysia
Kim Hye-yong 39'; Myong Yu-jong 46'; Kim Kyong-yong 52', 55', 78'; Ri Hye-gyong 90+6'	Report

Pamir Stadium, Dushanbe
Referee: Rawdha Almansoori (United Arab Emirates)
5 July 2025
22:00

Palestine	3–0	Tajikistan
Halim 49'; Youssef 69', 74'	Report

Pamir Stadium, Dushanbe
Referee: Gulshoda Saidqulova (Uzbekistan)

== Qualified teams ==
The host country Australia qualified automatically, along with the top three teams from the 2022 AFC Women's Asian Cup.

The following teams qualified for the tournament:

Team	Method of qualification	Date of qualification	Finals appearance	Last appearance	FIFA Ranking (Note: FIFA Women's World Ranking at the time of qualification.)	Previous best performance
Australia	Hosts	15 May 2024	7th	2022	15	Champions (2010)
China	2022 champions	18 December 2024	16th	2022	17	Champions (1986, 1989, 1991, 1993, 1995, 1997, 1999, 2006, 2022)
South Korea	2022 runners-up	18 December 2024	14th	2022	21	Runners-up (2022)
Japan	2022 third place	18 December 2024	18th	2022	7	Champions (2014, 2018)
Bangladesh	Group C winners	2 July 2025	1st	—N/a	128	Debut
Philippines	Group G winners	5 July 2025	11th	2022	41	Semi-finals (2022)
Vietnam	Group E winners	5 July 2025	10th	2022	37	Sixth place (2014, 2022)
India	Group B winners	5 July 2025	10th	2022	70	Runners-up (1979, 1983)
Chinese Taipei	Group D winners	5 July 2025	15th	2022	42	Champions (1977, 1979, 1981)
North Korea	Group H winners	5 July 2025	11th	2010	9	Champions (2001, 2003, 2008)
Uzbekistan	Group F winners	5 July 2025	6th	2003	51	Group stage (1995, 1997, 1999, 2001, 2003)
Iran	Group A winners	19 July 2025	2nd	2022	68	Group stage (2022)

== Goalscorers ==
There were 267 goals scored in 56 matches, for an average of 4.77 goals per match.

9 goals

- (Nepal women's national football team) Sabitra Bhandari
- (North Korea women's national football team) Kim Kyong-yong

6 goals

- (North Korea women's national football team) Myong Yu-jong
- (Uzbekistan women's national football team) Nilufar Kudratova

5 goals

- (Bangladesh women's national football team) Ritu Porna Chakma
- (India women's national football team) Pyari Xaxa
- (Iran women's national football team) Fatemeh Shaban
- (Jordan women's national football team) Maysa Jbarah
- (Myanmar women's national football team) Win Win
- (Thailand women's national football team) Karnjanathat Phomsri
- (Uzbekistan women's national football team) Diyorakhon Khabibullaeva

4 goals

- (India women's national football team) Sangita Basfore
- (Thailand women's national football team) Saowalak Peng-ngam
- (Uzbekistan women's national football team) Maftuna Shoyimova
- (Vietnam women's national football team) Nguyễn Thị Vạn

3 goals

- (Bangladesh women's national football team) Shamsunnahar Jr.
- (Bangladesh women's national football team) Tohura Khatun
- (Chinese Taipei women's national football team) Su Yu-hsuan
- (Guam women's national football team) Rebecca Bartosh
- (India women's national football team) Manisha Kalyan
- (Iraq women's national football team) Nur Al-Jawahiri
- (Lebanon women's national football team) Christy Maalouf
- (Myanmar women's national football team) Khin Mo Mo Tun
- (Myanmar women's national football team) Shwe Yee Tun
- (Nepal women's national football team) Gita Rana
- (North Korea women's national football team) Ri Hak
- (Philippines women's national football team) Meryll Serrano
- (Thailand women's national football team) Pattaranan Aupachai
- (Thailand women's national football team) Wiranya Kwaenkasikarm
- (United Arab Emirates women's national football team) Salha Al-Zaabi
- (Uzbekistan women's national football team) Lyudmila Karachik
- (Vietnam women's national football team) Ngân Thị Vạn Sự
- (Vietnam women's national football team) Nguyễn Thị Bích Thùy
- (Vietnam women's national football team) Phạm Hải Yến

2 goals

- (Bhutan women's national football team) Pema Choden Tshering
- (Chinese Taipei women's national football team) He Jia-shiuan
- (Chinese Taipei women's national football team) Liu Yu-chiao
- (Chinese Taipei women's national football team) Pu Hsin-hui
- (India women's national football team) Soumya Guguloth
- (India women's national football team) Priyadharshini Selladurai
- (Iran women's national football team) Sara Didar
- (Iran women's national football team) Zahra Ghanbari
- (Iran women's national football team) Negin Zandi
- (Jordan women's national football team) Bana Al-Bitar
- (Myanmar women's national football team) May Htet Lu
- (Nepal women's national football team) Anita Basnet
- (North Korea women's national football team) Kim Song-gyong
- (Pakistan women's national football team) Mariam Mahmood
- (Palestine women's national football team) Nour Youssef
- (Philippines women's national football team) Chandler McDaniel
- (Philippines women's national football team) Alexa Pino
- (Thailand women's national football team) Thanchanok Cheunarom
- (Thailand women's national football team) Thawanrat Promthongmee

1 goal

- (Bahrain women's national football team) Hessa Al-Isa
- (Bahrain women's national football team) Leleya Sabkar
- (Bangladesh women's national football team) Munki Akhter
- (Bangladesh women's national football team) Monika Chakma
- (Bangladesh women's national football team) Kohati Kisku
- (Bangladesh women's national football team) Sapna Rani
- (Bhutan women's national football team) Yeshey Bidha
- (Bhutan women's national football team) Dorji Edon
- (Bhutan women's national football team) Deki Lhazom
- (Bhutan women's national football team) Sunita Rai
- (Cambodia women's national football team) Heng Sovanmony
- (Cambodia women's national football team) Vibol Serysitha
- (Cambodia women's national football team) Voeun Sothan
- (Chinese Taipei women's national football team) Chen Jin-wen
- (Chinese Taipei women's national football team) Hsu Yi-yun
- (Chinese Taipei women's national football team) Saki Matsunaga
- (Chinese Taipei women's national football team) Su Sin-yun
- (Hong Kong women's national football team) Leung Hong Kiu
- (Hong Kong women's national football team) Tsang Lai Mae
- (India women's national football team) Karthika Angamuthu
- (India women's national football team) Grace Dangmei
- (India women's national football team) Nirmala Devi Phanjoubam
- (India women's national football team) Rimpa Haldar
- (India women's national football team) Lynda Kom
- (India women's national football team) Malavika Prasad
- (India women's national football team) Nongmaithem Ratanbala Devi
- (India women's national football team) Anju Tamang
- (Indonesia women's national football team) Helsya Maeisyaroh
- (Indonesia women's national football team) Isa Warps
- (Iran women's national football team) Zahra Alizadeh
- (Iran women's national football team) Roujin Tamrian
- (Iran women's national football team) Mohaddesh Zolfi
- (Iraq women's national football team) Tbarek Al-Ghazawi
- (Iraq women's national football team) Hoda Khalaf
- (Jordan women's national football team) Farah Abu Tayeh
- (Jordan women's national football team) Celine Akroush
- (Jordan women's national football team) Enas Al-Jamaeem
- (Jordan women's national football team) Ayah Al-Majali
- (Jordan women's national football team) Mai Sweilem
- (Kyrgyzstan women's national football team) Alina Gaparova
- (Laos women's national football team) Saysomone Inthaphone
- (Lebanon women's national football team) Lili Iskandar
- (Lebanon women's national football team) Pilar Khoury
- (Malaysia women's national football team) Henrietta Justine
- (Malaysia women's national football team) Farahiyah Muhammad Ridzuan
- (Mongolia women's national football team) Ulziibayar Badamkhatan
- (Mongolia women's national football team) Munkhzul Bayanmukh
- (Myanmar women's national football team) San Thaw Thaw
- (Myanmar women's national football team) Win Theingi Tun
- (Nepal women's national football team) Rashmi Ghising
- (Nepal women's national football team) Saru Limbu
- (Nepal women's national football team) Rekha Poudel
- (Nepal women's national football team) Puja Rana
- (Nepal women's national football team) Nisha Thokar
- (North Korea women's national football team) Chae Un-yong
- (North Korea women's national football team) Han Jin-hong
- (North Korea women's national football team) Hong Song-ok
- (North Korea women's national football team) Kim Hye-yong
- (North Korea women's national football team) Ri Hye-gyong
- (Pakistan women's national football team) Suha Hirani
- (Pakistan women's national football team) Nadia Khan
- (Palestine women's national football team) Dalia Asad Halim
- (Philippines women's national football team) Hali Long
- (Philippines women's national football team) Jaclyn Sawicki
- (Saudi Arabia women's national football team) Moudi Abdulmohsen Al-Angari
- (Singapore women's national football team) Ardhra Ganeswaran
- (Thailand women's national football team) Panittha Jeeratanapavibul
- (Thailand women's national football team) Pichayatida Manowang
- (Thailand women's national football team) Chatchawan Rodthong
- (Thailand women's national football team) Ploychompoo Somnuek
- (Timor-Leste women's national football team) Maria Auxiliadora Da Conceição
- (Timor-Leste women's national football team) Vanessa Filomena Fernandes
- (Timor-Leste women's national football team) Dolores Verdiana Costa
- (Turkmenistan women's national football team) Laçyn Alymjanowa
- (Turkmenistan women's national football team) Mariýa Çaryýewa
- (United Arab Emirates women's national football team) Maitha Al-Hazmi
- (United Arab Emirates women's national football team) Fatima Al-Hosani
- (Uzbekistan women's national football team) Asalkhon Aminjonova
- (Uzbekistan women's national football team) Umida Zoirova
- (Vietnam women's national football team) Chương Thị Kiều
- (Vietnam women's national football team) Nguyễn Thị Mỹ Anh
- (Vietnam women's national football team) Ngọc Minh Chuyên
- (Vietnam women's national football team) Thái Thị Thảo

1 own goal

- (Bahrain women's national football team) Rawan Nabeel Al Ali (against Bangladesh)
- (Bhutan women's national football team) Kelzang Tshering Wangmo (against Singapore)
- (Cambodia women's national football team) Somrit Nimol (against Philippines)
- (Iran women's national football team) Fatemeh Amineh (against Jordan)
- (Laos women's national football team) Saysamone Inthaphone (against Nepal)
- (Palestine women's national football team) Sara Kord (against North Korea)
- (Sri Lanka women's national football team) Ashani Anuradhini (against Laos)
- (Timor-Leste women's national football team) Brigida Garcia da Costa (against Mongolia)

== See also ==
- 2027 AFC Asian Cup qualification
- 2026 AFC U-23 Asian Cup qualification
- 2026 AFC U-17 Asian Cup qualification
- 2026 AFC U-20 Women's Asian Cup qualification
- 2026 AFC U-17 Women's Asian Cup qualification
