= Hoda Khalaf =

Moroccan footballer (born 1997)

Hoda Khalaf هدى خلف (Arabic)
Personal information
- Full name: Hoda Hadi Abdelamir Khalaf
- Date of birth: 19 December 1997 (age 28)
- Place of birth: Sweden
- Position: Forward

Team information
- Current team: Sollentuna

Senior career*
Years	Team	Apps	(Gls)
2014	Sollentuna		
2015	Vasalunds		
2016	Bele Barkarby		
2017–2021	Sätra		
2019	→ Sollentuna (loan)		
2020	→ Rågsved (loan)		
2021	→ Rågsved (loan)		
2021–2024	Bollstanäs SK		
2024	Älvsjö AIK		
2025–	Sollentuna		

International career^{‡}
2021–2023	Morocco	2	(0)
2024–	Iraq	5	(1)
- * Club domestic league appearances and goals ‡ National team caps and goals as of 17:43, 26 June 2025 (UTC)

Hoda Hadi Abdelamir Khalaf (Arabic: هدى هدير عبد الأمير خلف; born 19 December 1997) is a footballer who plays as a forward for Sollentuna. Born in Sweden, she plays for the Iraq national team.

== Club career ==
Khalaf has played for Sollentuna FK, Vasalunds, Bele Barkarby FF, Sätra, Rågsveds IF, Bollstanäs SK and Älvsjö AIK in Sweden.

== International career ==
Khalaf made her senior debut for Morocco on 10 June 2021 as a 74th-minute substitution in a 3–0 friendly home win over Mali. In 2024, she changed her allegiance to compete for Iraq. On 26 June 2025, she netted her first goal for Iraq in a 5–2 victory over Mongolia during the 2026 AFC Women's Asian Cup qualification.

List of international goals scored.
No.	Date	Venue	Opponent	Score	Result	Competition
1.	26 June 2025	700th Anniversary Stadium, Chiang Mai, Thailand	Mongolia	4–2	5–2	2026 AFC Women's Asian Cup qualification

== See also ==
- List of Morocco women's international footballers
