= Aya Abed =

Palestinian footballer (born 1999)

Aya Abed آيَة عَابِد
Personal information
- Date of birth: 5 January 1999 (age 27)
- Place of birth: Bi'ina, Israel
- Position: Striker

Team information
- Current team: Hapoel Ihud Bnot I'billin

Youth career
- 2011–2016: Hapoel Bnot Bi'ina
- 2016–2018: Ihud Bnot Majd al-Krum

Senior career*
Years	Team	Apps	(Gls)
2018–2024	Hapoel Bnot Arraba	120	(67)
2024–	Hapoel Ihud Bnot I'billin		

International career^{‡}
2014–2015	Israel U17	5	(1)
2022–	Palestine	10	(2)
- * Club domestic league appearances and goals as of 28 May 2024 ‡ National team caps and goals as of 29 November 2024

Aya Abed (Arabic: آيَة عَابِد; Hebrew: איה עאבד; born 5 January 1999) is a professional footballer who plays as a striker for Liga Artzit club Hapoel Ihud Bnot I'billin. Born in Israel, she plays for the Palestine national team.

== Club career ==
Abed developed an interest in football at a young age and began playing at 12 with the Ba'na girls' team under coach Mohamed Titi. Following the merger of Ba'na and Majd al-Krum, she continued with the unified team. Abed remains focused on reaching the highest levels of football and aspires to play for a top club, such as Barcelona Femení.

Abed later joined Arraba, contributing to the team's promotion in 2019, and has been playing for them ever since.

== International career ==
Born in Shaghur, Israel, Abed holds dual Israeli and Palestinian nationality. She was eligible to play for both national teams and represented Israel at the under-17 level before choosing to play for Palestine. Abed, who also served as a referee in addition to being a player, was dismissed from her refereeing role after participating with Palestine in the 2024 WAFF Women's Championship.

=== Palestine ===
Abed started playing for the Palestinian national team at the 2022 WAFF Women's Championship where she scored her first international goal, the team's only goal in the tournament, in a 1–1 draw against Syria.

International goals

No.	Date	Venue	Opponent	Score	Result	Competition
1.	1 September 2022	Petra Stadium, Amman, Jordan	Syria	1–0	1–1	2022 WAFF Women's Championship
2.	20 February 2024	King Abdullah Sports City Reserve Stadium, Jeddah, Saudi Arabia	Iraq	3–0	3–0	2024 WAFF Women's Championship
