= Negin Zandi =

Iranian footballer (born 2004)

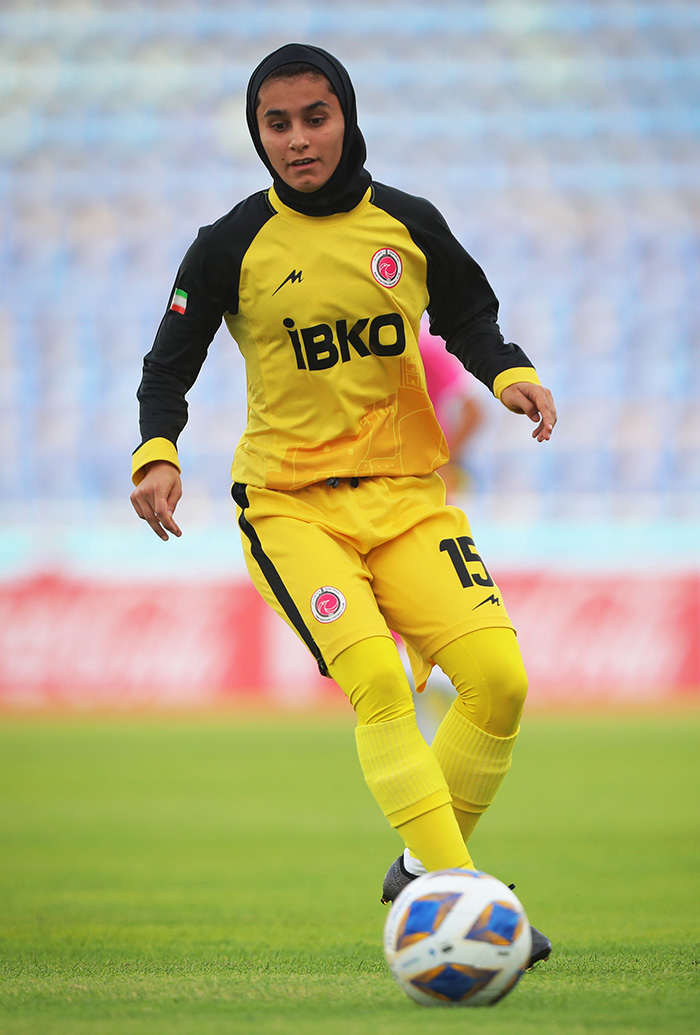
- Negin Zandi plays for Bam Khatoon F.C. in the AFC Women's Club Championship 2022

Personal information
- Full name: Negin Zandidarehgharibi
- Date of birth: 20 January 2004 (age 22)
- Place of birth: Izeh, Khuzestan, Iran
- Position: Forward

Team information
- Current team: Bam Khatoon FC
- Number: 72

Senior career*
Years	Team	Apps	(Gls)
- Bam Khatoon FC

International career^{‡}
2021	Iran	4	(1)
- * Club domestic league appearances and goals ‡ National team caps and goals as of 12 January 2022

Negin Zandi Dareh Gharibi (Persian: نگین زندی; born 20 January 2004), also known as Negin Zandi, is an Iranian footballer who plays as a forward for Kowsar Women Football League club Bam Khatoon FC and the Iran national team.

== International career ==
She has represented Iran internationally in four games and scored 1 goal.

== International goals ==
No.	Date	Venue	Opponent	Score	Result	Competition
1.	26 August 2021	Milliy Stadium, Tashkent, Uzbekistan	Uzbekistan	1–1	1–1	Friendly
2.	8 April 2023	Thuwunna Stadium, Yangon, Myanmar	Myanmar	1–0	1–1	2024 AFC Women's Olympic Qualifying Tournament
3.	10 June 2025	National Football Center Field 2, Tehran, Iran	Iraq	1–0	8–0	Friendly
4.	10 June 2025	National Football Center Field 2, Tehran, Iran	Iraq	2–0	8–0	Friendly
5.	12 June 2025	National Football Center Field 2, Tehran, Iran	Iraq	?–0	7–0	Friendly
6.	12 June 2025	National Football Center Field 2, Tehran, Iran	Iraq	?–0	7–0	Friendly
7.	13 July 2025	King Abdullah II Stadium, Amman, Jordan	Bhutan	4–1	7–1	2026 AFC Women's Asian Cup qualification
8.	19 July 2025	King Abdullah II Stadium, Amman, Jordan	Jordan	2–0	2–1	2026 AFC Women's Asian Cup qualification
