= Nur Al-Jawahiri =

Dutch-Iraqi footballer (born 2003)

Personal information
- Full name: Nur Salam Jawad Al-Jawahiri
- Date of birth: 23 July 2003 (age 23)
- Place of birth: Zoetermeer, Netherlands

Team information
- Current team: Sparta Rotterdam
- Number: 10

Youth career
- 2018–2020: BVV Barendrecht

Senior career*
Years	Team	Apps	(Gls)
2020–2023	Excelsior Rotterdam	17	(0)
- Sparta Rotterdam

International career^{‡}
2025–	Iraq	8	(5)
- * Club domestic league appearances and goals ‡ National team caps and goals as of 6 December 2025

Nur Salam Jawad Al-Jawahiri (Arabic: نُور سَلَام جَوَاد ٱلْجَوَاهِرِي; Born 23 July 2003) is an Iraqi professional footballer who plays as a forward for Vrouwen Eerste divisie club Sparta Rotterdam. Born in the Netherlands to Iraqi parents, she represents the Iraq national football team.

== Club career ==
Born in Zoetermeer and raised in Pijnacker, Al-Jawahiri began playing football at the age of six with local club DSVP. After an unbeaten season with the youth team, she was scouted by Excelsior Rotterdam at age 15. Then, at 16, she made her Eredivisie debut on 16 February 2020 in an away match against SC Heerenveen. She spent three years with Excelsior, mostly featuring for the reserves, before moving to Sparta Rotterdam in search of more regular playing time.

== International career ==
Al-Jawahiri was born in the Netherlands to Iraqi parents, making her eligible to represent either the Netherlands or Iraq at international level.

In February 2024, Al-Jawahiri got her first call-up to the Iraqi senior team for a preparatory training camp in Paris for the 2024 WAFF Women's Championship. However, an injury during the camp forced her to be withdrawn and miss the tournament. She earned a second call-up in June 2025 for the 2026 AFC Women's Asian Cup qualification. On 23 June 2025, she made her international debut against Timor-Leste. Three days later, on 26 June, Al-Jawahiri scored Iraq's first-ever competitive goal on the international stage against Mongolia and became the first Iraqi woman to score a hat-trick, leading the team to its historic first official win.

== Career statistics ==
=== International ===
As of match played 26 November 2025

Appearances and goals by national team and year
National team	Year	Apps	Goals
Iraq	2024	0	0
Iraq	2025	6	5
Total		6	5

Scores and results list Iraq's goal tally first, score column indicates score after each Al-Jawahiri goal.

List of international goals scored by Nur Al-Jawahiri
No.	Date	Venue	Opponent	Score	Result	Competition
1	26 June 2025	700th Anniversary Stadium, Chiang Mai, Thailand	Mongolia	1–1	5–2	2026 AFC Women's Asian Cup qualification
2	26 June 2025	700th Anniversary Stadium, Chiang Mai, Thailand	Mongolia	3–2	5–2	2026 AFC Women's Asian Cup qualification
3	26 June 2025	700th Anniversary Stadium, Chiang Mai, Thailand	Mongolia	5–2	5–2	2026 AFC Women's Asian Cup qualification
4	24 November 2025	Hall Stadium – King Abdullah Sports City, Jeddah, Saudi Arabia	Saudi Arabia	1–2	1–2	2025 WAFF Women's Championship
5	26 November 2025	Hall Stadium – King Abdullah Sports City, Jeddah, Saudi Arabia	United Arab Emirates	2–0	3–0	2025 WAFF Women's Championship
