= Lana Feras =

Jordanian footballer

Personal information
- Full name: Lana Waleed Issa Feras
- Date of birth: 1 June 1998 (age 28)
- Place of birth: Amman, Jordan
- Position: Defender

Team information
- Current team: Eastern Flames
- Number: 98

Senior career*
Years	Team	Apps	(Gls)
–2022	Amman SC		
2019–2020	→ Shabab Al-Ordon (loan)		
2022–2023	Etihad Club		
2023–2025	Al-Shabab		
2025–	Eastern Flames		

International career^{‡}
2014–2016	Jordan U19	4	(2)
2017–	Jordan	52	(4)
- * Club domestic league appearances and goals ‡ National team caps and goals as of 8 April 2025

Lana Waleed Issa Feras (Arabic: لانا فراس; born 1 June 1998) is a Jordanian footballer who plays as a defender for the Jordan women's national team.

== International goals ==
No.	Date	Venue	Opponent	Score	Result	Competition
1.	23 February 2024	King Abdullah Sports City, Jeddah, Saudi Arabia	Lebanon	2–0	2–0	2024 WAFF Women's Championship
2.	27 February 2024	Prince Abdullah Al-Faisal Sports City, Jeddah, Saudi Arabia	Palestine	2–0	5–0	2024 WAFF Women's Championship
3.	29 February 2024	Prince Abdullah Al-Faisal Sports City, Jeddah, Saudi Arabia	Nepal	1–1	2–2 (5–3 p)	2024 WAFF Women's Championship
4.	1 December 2024	Petra Stadium, Amman, Jordan	Iran	2–1	2–1	Friendly
5.	24 November 2025	Hall Stadium – King Abdullah Sports City, Jeddah, Saudi Arabia	Palestine	2–0	3–0	2025 WAFF Women's Championship
