= Miral Qassis =

Palestinian footballer (born 2006)

Personal information
- Full name: Miral Khadir Mikhail Qassis
- Date of birth: 22 July 2006 (age 20)
- Place of birth: Bethlehem, West Bank
- Position: Forward

Team information
- Current team: Zamalek SC
- Number: 11

Senior career*
Years	Team	Apps	(Gls)
–2024	Diyar Soccer Team		(45)
2024–	Zamalek	7	(1)

International career^{‡}
2019	Palestine U15	3	(1)
2023–	Palestine U20	3	(2)
2023–	Palestine	10	(2)
2022–	Palestine Futsal	3	(0)
- * Club domestic league appearances and goals as of 25 November 2024 ‡ National team caps and goals as of 29 November 2024

Miral Khadir Mikhail Qassis (Arabic: ميرال خضر ميكائيل قسيس; born 22 July 2006) is a Palestinian professional footballer who plays as a striker for Egyptian club Zamalek SC and the Palestine national team.

== Club career ==
In 2018, at the age of 12, Qassis led the Diyar Girls Team to win the Under-14 Girls Futsal Tournament organized by Palestine's Women's Football Committee.

In September 2024, it was announced that the newly established women's section of Zamalek SC had signed Qassis for its inaugural team. On 21 November 2024, she won the Kora Plus Best Player award for the eighth round of the Women's Premier League.

== International career ==
Qassis has represented Palestine in football at all age levels as well as in futsal.

=== Senior ===
In May 2023, she received her first call-up to the Palestine senior team for two friendly matches against Saudi Arabia. She scored her first international goal against the host team on 11 May 2023, leveling the score in a 1–1 draw. She was selected for the final squad for the 2024 WAFF Women's Championship, where she scored the winning goal in the match against Syria to send Palestine to the semifinals.

=== International goals ===
Scores and results list Palestine's goal tally first, score column indicates score after each Qassis goal.

No.	Date	Venue	Opponent	Score	Result	Competition
1.	11 May 2023	Prince Abdullah Al Faisal Stadium, Jeddah, Saudi Arabia	Saudi Arabia	1–1	1–1	Friendly
2.	22 February 2024	King Abdullah Sports City Reserve Stadium, Jeddah, Saudi Arabia	Syria	1–0	1–0	2024 WAFF Women's Championship
3.	26 November 2025	Hall Stadium – King Abdullah Sports City, Jeddah, Saudi Arabia	Lebanon	3–0	3–0	2025 WAFF Women's Championship
