= Nour Youssef =

Palestinian footballer (born 2005)

Personal information
- Date of birth: 18 July 2005 (age 21)
- Place of birth: Berlin, Germany
- Position: Forward

Youth career
- 2018–2019: SV Adler Berlin
- 2020–2022: 1. FC Union Berlin

Senior career*
Years	Team	Apps	(Gls)
2022–2024	1. FC Union Berlin	34	(16)
2024–2025	Viktoria Berlin	5	(0)

International career
2024–	Palestine	6	(3)
2025–	Palestine (futsal)	3	(3)
- * Club domestic league appearances and goals

Nour Youssef (Arabic: نُور يُوسُف; born 18 July 2005) is a footballer who plays as a forward. She last played for Regionalliga Nordost club Viktoria Berlin. Born in Germany, she plays for the Palestine national football team and the Palestine national futsal team.

== Early life ==
Youssef was born in Germany to a Palestinian father and a Kosovar-Albanian mother, and holds German, Palestinian, and Albanian nationalities.

== Club career ==
Youssef has played for the 1. FC Union Berlin youth team since 2020. In July 2022, at the age of 16, she was integrated into the senior team.

== International career ==
Youssef was first called up by coach Amer Khair to join the Palestione senior national team in February 2024, and was named for Palestine's final squad for the 2024 WAFF Women's Championship. She made her full international debut against Iraq on 20 February 2024, scoring a brace in the same match.

== Career statistics ==
=== Club ===
As of match played 21 March 2023

Appearances and goals by club, season and competition
Club	Season	League			DFB Pokal		Continental		Total	
Club	Season	Division	Apps	Goals	Apps	Goals	Apps	Goals	Apps	Goals
1. FC Union Berlin	2022–23	Frauen-Regionalliga	23	13	–		–		23	13
1. FC Union Berlin	2023–24	Frauen-Regionalliga	11	3	–		–		11	3
1. FC Union Berlin	Total		34	16	–		–		34	16
Career total			34	16	–		–		34	16

=== International ===
As of 29 May 2025

Appearances and goals by national team and year
National team	Year	Apps	Goals
Palestine	2024	6	3
Palestine	2025	1	1
Total		7	4

Scores and results list Palestine goal tally first, score column indicates score after each Youssef goal.

List of international goals scored by Nour Youssef
No.	Date	Venue	Opponent	Score	Result	Competition
1	20 February 2024	Jeddah, Saudi Arabia	Iraq	1–0	3–0	2024 WAFF Women's Championship
2	20 February 2024	Jeddah, Saudi Arabia	Iraq	2–0	3–0	2024 WAFF Women's Championship
–	15 May 2024	Dublin, Republic of Ireland	(Republic of Ireland) Bohemian	2–1	2–1	Non-FIFA Friendly
3	29 November 2024	Doha, Qatar	Saudi Arabia	1–0	1–0	Friendly
4	29 May 2025	Beirut, Lebanon	Lebanon	1–0	1–1	Friendly
5	5 July 2025	Dushanbe, Tajikistan	Tajikistan	2–0	3–0	2026 AFC Women's Asian Cup qualification
6	5 July 2025	Dushanbe, Tajikistan	Tajikistan	3–0	3–0	2026 AFC Women's Asian Cup qualification
7	2 December 2025	Jeddah, Saudi Arabia	Jordan	1–3	1–3	2025 WAFF Women's Championship
