= Farah Abu Tayeh =

Jordanian footballer

Personal information
- Full name: Farah Abu Tayeh
- Date of birth: 13 June 1998 (age 28)
- Place of birth: United States
- Height: 1.65 m (5 ft 5 in)
- Position: Forward

Team information
- Current team: Kifisia WFC

College career
Years	Team	Apps	(Gls)
2016–2019	Marshall Thundering Herd	35	(10)

Senior career*
Years	Team	Apps	(Gls)
2023–2025	Georgia Impact		
2025–	Kifisia	23	(2)

International career^{‡}
2024–	Jordan	5	(0)
- * Club domestic league appearances and goals ‡ National team caps and goals as of 4 June 2026

Farah Abu Tayeh (Arabic: فرح أبو تايه) is a footballer who plays as a forward for Greek A Division club Kifisia WFC. Born in United States, she represents the Jordan national team.

== Personal life ==
Raised in Williamsville, she has a twin sister, Marah Abu Tayeh, who also represents the Jordan national team alongside her.

== International goals ==
No.	Date	Venue	Opponent	Score	Result	Competition
1.	28 May 2025	King Abdullah II Stadium, Amman, Jordan	Indonesia	1–1	1–1	Friendly
2.	7 July 2025	King Abdullah II Stadium, Amman, Jordan	Lebanon	4–0	4–0	2026 AFC Women's Asian Cup qualification
3.	2 December 2025	Prince Abdullah Al-Faisal Sports City Stadium, Jeddah, Saudi Arabia	Palestine	3–0	3–1	2025 WAFF Women's Championship
