= Charlotte Phillips =

Palestinian footballer (born 2005)

Personal information
- Date of birth: 24 June 2005 (age 21)
- Place of birth: Markham, Ontario, Canada
- Height: 1.70 m (5 ft 7 in)
- Position: Goalkeeper

Team information
- Current team: York Lions
- Number: 20

College career
Years	Team	Apps	(Gls)
2023–	York Lions	13	(0)

International career^{‡}
2023	Palestine U20	2	(0)
2023–	Palestine	11	(0)
- ‡ National team caps and goals as of November 29, 2024

Charlotte Phillips (Arabic: شارلوت ماري أوديت فيليبس; born 24 June 2005) is a footballer who plays as a goalkeeper for U Sports team York Lions. Born in Canada, she represents Palestine at the international level.

== Early life ==
Phillips was born in Markham, Ontario, Canada to a Bahamian father and Palestinian mother. She is the granddaughter of George and Odette Dabit. George was a Palestinian forced to flee his home in Jaffa during the Nakba in 1948, and Odette was a Palestinian Christian who emigrated with him to Canada.

== College career ==
In January 2023, Phillips committed to the York University Women's Soccer team, the York Lions.

== International career ==
Phillips is a triple nationality holder with Bahamian, Palestinian and Canadian citizenship and was eligible to represent any of the three. In March 2023, she was included in the Palestine under-20 team for the 2024 AFC U-20 Women's Asian Cup qualification held in Al-Ram. Two months later, Phillips received her first call-up to the Palestinian senior team for two friendly matches against Saudi Arabia. In February 2024, she was selected for the final squad of the 2024 WAFF Women's Championship, where she helped Palestine reach the semi-finals, keeping two clean sheets against Iraq and Syria.
