= Rania Sansur =

Footballer (born 2006)

Personal information
- Full name: Rania Verena Sansur Osorio
- Date of birth: 24 April 2006 (age 20)
- Place of birth: Santiago, Chile
- Height: 1.62 m (5 ft 4 in)
- Positions: Midfielder; forward

Team information
- Current team: Palestino
- Number: 5

Youth career
- 2019–2024: Audax Italiano

Senior career*
Years	Team	Apps	(Gls)
2024	Audax Italiano	16	(0)
2025–	Palestino	10	(0)

International career^{‡}
2024	Palestine U18	4	(0)
2025–	Palestine U20	7	(0)
2025–	Palestine	7	(1)
- * Club domestic league appearances and goals as of 13 September 2025 ‡ National team caps and goals as of 26 November 2025

Rania Verena Sansur Osorio (Note: In official Palestinian documents, including her passport, her name is registered as Rina Boris S. Osorio.) (Arabic: رانيا فيرينا صنصور أوسوريو; born 24 April 2006) is a professional footballer who plays as a forward for Chilean club Palestino. Born in Chile, she plays for the Palestine national team.

== Early life ==
Sansur was born in Santiago, Chile, into a family of Palestinian descent. Her paternal grandparents originated from Beit Jala and Bethlehem, with her grandfather emigrating from Palestine to Peru before settling in Chile, where her father became the first generation born in the country. She grew up in an environment where Arab traditions were maintained through language, cuisine and family gatherings. Sansur developed an interest in football at the age of seven.

== Club career ==
In February 2025, Sansur signed for Santiago-based Palestino, becoming the club's first female player of Palestinian descent and the first Palestinian national team member to represent the team bearing the same name.

== International career ==
In November 2024, Sansur received her first call-up to the Palestine under-18 team for the 2024 WAFF U-18 Girls Championship, becoming one of the first two players based in Chile to be selected for a Palestinian national team at any age level. Four months later she got selected for the Palestine under-20 team for the 2025 WAFF U-20 Girls Championship, where she helped secure Palestine's first-ever WAFF title across all categories.

In late May 2025, Sansur got her first call-up to the Palestinian senior team for friendly matches against Lebanon. On 26 November 2025, during the 2025 WAFF Women's Championship, she scored her first international goal in Palestine's 3–0 win over Lebanon.

== Career statistics ==
=== International ===
Scores and results list Palestine's goal tally first; score column indicates score after each Sansur goal.

List of international goals scored by Rania Sansur
No.	Date	Venue	Opponent	Score	Result	Competition	Ref.
1	November 27, 2025	Jeddah, Saudi Arabia	Lebanon	2–0	3–0	2025 WAFF Women's Championship	
