= Marah Abu Tayeh =

Jordanian footballer

Personal information
- Full name: Marah Abu Tayeh
- Date of birth: 13 June 1998 (age 28)
- Place of birth: United States
- Height: 1.67 m (5 ft 6 in)
- Position: Midfielder

Team information
- Current team: Borussia Dortmund
- Number: 7

College career
Years	Team	Apps	(Gls)
2018–2019	Marshall Thundering Herd	35	(17)

Senior career*
Years	Team	Apps	(Gls)
2021–2023	FSV Gütersloh 2009	25	(1)
2023–	Borussia Dortmund		

International career^{‡}
2024–	Jordan	1	(0)
- * Club domestic league appearances and goals ‡ National team caps and goals as of 1 December 2024

Marah Abu Tayeh (Arabic: مرح أبو تايه) is a footballer who plays as a midfielder for Regionalliga club Borussia Dortmund. Born in United States, she represents the Jordan national team.

== Personal life ==
Raised in Williamsville, she has a twin sister, Farah Abu Tayeh, who also represents the Jordan national team alongside her.

== International goals ==
No.	Date	Venue	Opponent	Score	Result	Competition
1.	28 November 2025	Hall Stadium – King Abdullah Sports City, Jeddah, Saudi Arabia	Lebanon	5–0	5–0	2025 WAFF Women's Championship
2.	30 November 2025	Hall Stadium – King Abdullah Sports City, Jeddah, Saudi Arabia	Iraq	2–0	3–0	2025 WAFF Women's Championship
3.	3 June 2026	King Abdullah II Stadium, Amman, Jordan	Malaysia	1–0	4–3	Friendly
