= Mai Sweilem =

Jordanian footballer

Personal information
- Full name: Mai Salem Butros Sweilem
- Date of birth: 25 September 1995 (age 31)
- Place of birth: Amman, Jordan
- Position: Midfielder

Team information
- Current team: Al Shabab

Senior career*
Years	Team	Apps	(Gls)
2021–2022	Konak Belediyespor	20	(3)
2022–2023	Al Yamamah		
2023–	Al Shabab	7	(1)

International career^{‡}
2010–	Jordan	70	(14)
- * Club domestic league appearances and goals as of 22 May 2022 ‡ National team caps and goals as of 4 April 2025

Mai Salem Butros Sweilem (born 25 September 1995), known as Mai Sweilem (Arabic: مي سويلم), is a Jordanian footballer, who plays as a midfielder for the Saudi Women's Premier League club Al Shabab and the Jordan women's national team.

== Club career ==
In December 2021, Sweilem moved to Turkey to join the İzmir-based club Konak Belediyespor in the 2021–22 Women's Super League.

== International goals ==
No.	Date	Venue	Opponent	Score	Result	Competition
1.	10 April 2017	Pamir Stadium, Dushanbe, Tajikistan	Tajikistan	5–1	10–2	2018 AFC Women's Asian Cup qualification
2.	10 April 2017	Pamir Stadium, Dushanbe, Tajikistan	Tajikistan	6–1	10–2	2018 AFC Women's Asian Cup qualification
3.	2 February 2018	Petra Stadium, Amman, Jordan	Afghanistan	4–0	5–0	Friendly
4.	5 February 2018	Petra Stadium, Amman, Jordan	Afghanistan	5–0	6–0	Friendly
5.	5 February 2018	Petra Stadium, Amman, Jordan	Afghanistan	6–0	6–0	Friendly
6.	9 October 2022	Police Academy Stadium, Cairo, Egypt	Egypt	1–0	1–0	Friendly
7.	19 February 2024	King Abdullah Sports City Reserve Stadium, Jeddah, Saudi Arabia	Saudi Arabia	1–0	3–1	2024 WAFF Women's Championship
8.	13 July 2025	King Abdullah II Stadium, Amman, Jordan	Singapore	5–0	5–0	2026 AFC Women's Asian Cup qualification
9.	24 November 2025	Hall Stadium - King Abdullah Sports City, Jeddah, Saudi Arabia	Palestine	1–0	3–0	2025 WAFF Women's Championship
10.	28 November 2025	Hall Stadium - King Abdullah Sports City, Jeddah, Saudi Arabia	Lebanon	1–0	5–0	2025 WAFF Women's Championship
