= Enas Al-Jamaeen =

Jordanian footballer

Personal information
- Full name: Enas Faris Ahmad Al-Jamaeen
- Date of birth: 11 November 2003 (age 22)
- Place of birth: Dhiban, Jordan
- Position: Midfielder

Team information
- Current team: Fomget G.S.
- Number: 23

Senior career*
Years	Team	Apps	(Gls)
- Amman SC
2022	Fomget G.S.	2	(0)
2022	Amed S.F.K.	10	(0)

International career^{‡}
2015–2016	Jordan U14	5	(0)
2016–2018	Jordan U16	8	(6)
2018	Jordan U19	3	(1)
2021–	Jordan	40	(3)
- * Club domestic league appearances and goals as of 8 May 2022 ‡ National team caps and goals as of 8 April 2025

Enas Faris Ahmad Al-Jamaeen (Arabic: إيناس فارس أحمد الجماعين; born 11 November 2003), also known as Enas Al-Jamaeen, is a Jordanian footballer, who plays as a midfielder for the Turkish Women's Super League club Fomget G.S., and the Jordan women's national team.

== Early life ==
Enas Faris Ahmad Al-Jamaeen was born in Dhiban, Jordan on 11 November 2003.

== Club career ==
Al-Jamaeen played for Amman SC in her country, before she moved to Turkey end December 2021, and joined the Ankara-based club Fomget G.S. to play in the 2021–22 Turkish Women's Super League. After two games with Fomget, she transferred to the Diyarbakır-based club Amed S.F.K. At the end of the league season, she left Turkey.

== International career ==
Al-Jamaeen made her senior debut for Jordan on 7 April 2021 in a 0–1 friendly loss to Lithuania. She scored her first international goal against India on 19 March 2023 in a friendly match.

== International goals ==
Scores and results list Jordan's goal tally first.

No.	Date	Venue	Opponent	Score	Result	Competition
1.	19 March 2023	Petra Stadium, Amman, Jordan	India	2–0	2–1	Friendly
2.	27 February 2024	Prince Abdullah Al-Faisal Sports City, Jeddah, Saudi Arabia	Palestine	5–0	5–0	2024 WAFF Women's Championship
3.	1 December 2024	Petra Stadium, Amman, Jordan	Iran	1–0	2–1	Friendly
4.	13 July 2025	King Abdullah II Stadium, Amman, Jordan	Singapore	4–0	5–0	2026 AFC Women's Asian Cup qualification
