= Nadia Fadhil =

Iraqi footballer (born 1995)

Personal information
- Full name: Nadia Fadhil Abdulameer Al-Balahi
- Date of birth: 28 April 1995 (age 31)
- Place of birth: Iraq
- Position: Midfielder

Senior career*
Years	Team	Apps	(Gls)
- Al-Quwa Al-Jawiya

International career
- Iraq
- * Club domestic league appearances and goals

Nadia Fadhil (Arabic: نادية فاضل; born 28 April 1995) is an Iraqi professional women's footballer who plays as a midfielder for the Iraq women's national football team. She is also member of the Iraq women's national futsal team.

== Early life ==
Fadhil is a native of Wasit Governorate, Iraq, and attended the University of Baghdad.

== Career ==
Fadhil was the top scorer of the Iraq She played for Saudi Arabian side Al-Himma, helping the club achieve promotion.

== International goals ==
No.	Date	Venue	Opponent	Score	Result	Competition
1.	2 December 2025	Prince Abdullah Al-Faisal Sports City Stadium, Jeddah, Saudi Arabia	Saudi Arabia	2–2	2–2 (4–2 p)	2025 WAFF Women's Championship

== Style of play ==
Fadhil mainly operates as a midfielder or striker.

== Personal life ==
Fadhil has regarded Iraq international Hawar Mulla Mohammed as her football idol.
