= Ahlam-Laila Nasr =

Palestinian footballer (born 2004)

Personal information
- Full name: Ahlam-Laila Lolo Nasr
- Date of birth: 4 November 2004 (age 22)
- Place of birth: Arlöv, Sweden
- Position: Midfielder

Team information
- Current team: Al Ahly
- Number: 6

Youth career
- 2022: FC Rosengård

Senior career*
Years	Team	Apps	(Gls)
2023–2024	Ifö Bromölla IF	4	(0)
2024–	Al Ahly	44	(15)

International career^{‡}
2019	Sweden U18	0	(0)
2023–	Palestine	9	(4)
- * Club domestic league appearances and goals as of 17 February 2026 ‡ National team caps and goals as of 29 November 2024

Ahlam-Laila Lolo Nasr (Arabic: أَحْلَام لَيْلَى لُولُو نَصْر; born 4 November 2004) is a professional footballer who plays as a midfielder for Egyptian Women's Premier League club Al Ahly. Born in Sweden, she plays for the Palestine national team.

== Club career ==
In January 2023, she joined Elitettan side Ifö Bromölla IF from Rosengård.

In October 2024, the newly formed Al Ahly women's section announced the signing of Nasr on a free transfer.

== International career ==
Born in Sweden, Nasr represented her country of birth at the under-18 level in 2019 before switching allegiance to Palestine in 2023.

=== Senior career ===
In May 2023, Nasr received her first call-up to the Palestine senior team for two friendly matches against Saudi Arabia. In July 2023, during the Lebanon training camp, Nasr scored her first international goal against the host team in a 2–1 defeat on 21 July 2023.

=== International goals ===
No.	Date	Venue	Opponent	Score	Result	Competition
1.	21 July 2023	Tripoli Municipal Stadium, Tripoli, Lebanon	Lebanon	1–2	1–2	International Friendly
2.	1 June 2024	Al Ahli Stadium, Manama, Bahrain	Bahrain	1–0	1–0	International Friendly
3.	4 June 2024	Al Ahli Stadium, Manama, Bahrain	Bahrain	1–0	2–1	International Friendly
4.	1 June 2025	Fouad Chehab Stadium, Jounieh, Lebanon	Lebanon	1–1	1–2	International Friendly
