= Florencia Saavedra =

Chilean footballer (born 2005)

Florencia Saavedra فلورنسيا صابات
Personal information
- Full name: Florencia Victoria Saavedra Sabat
- Date of birth: 4 April 2005 (age 21)
- Place of birth: Santiago, Chile
- Height: 5 ft 5 in (1.65 m)
- Positions: Midfielder; forward

Team information
- Current team: McNeese Cowgirls
- Number: 10

Youth career
- 2017–2023: Universidad Católica

College career
Years	Team	Apps	(Gls)
2023-	McNeese Cowgirls	3	(2)

International career^{‡}
2023	Chile U20	0	(0)
2024–	Palestine	2	(0)
- ‡ National team caps and goals as of 24 December 2024

Florencia Victoria Saavedra Sabat (Arabic: فلورنسيا صابات; born 4 April 2005) is a Chilean-Palestinian professional footballer who plays as a midfielder for McNeese Cowgirls and the Palestine national team.

== Youth career ==
On 4 December 2023, Saavedra helped the Cruzados reach the final of the Femenino Gatorade, opening the score in the 12th minute.

In December 2023, Saavedra won the best player award of the under-19 category of Cruzados youth teams.

On 2023, Saavedra won 2 times the national Chilean championship, being in the starting eleven both times.

On 2024, Saavedra won the Chilean championship for the third time, with Universidad Católica.

== College career ==
On 9 November 2023, McNeese Cowgirls announced the signing of Saavedra for the 2024–25 academic year.

== International career ==
Born in Chile, Saavedra holds dual Chilean and Palestinian nationality and was eligible to represent either country.

In January 2023, She was called for La Roja under-20 team for a training camp in Quilín.

In November 2024, She got her first call-up to the Palestinian senior team for the two friendlies against Saudi Arabia. On 29 November 2024, she made her debut for the team in a 1–0 victory over Saudi Arabia, coming on as a substitute for Dima Al Ramhe in the 78th minute.

=== Career statistics ===
==== Caps ====
List of international caps for Palestine / Florencia Saavedra
#	Date	Venue	Opponent	Result	Minutes	Competition
1	29 November 2024	Aspire Academy Stadium, Doha	Saudi Arabia	1–0	13'	International Friendly
2	3 December 2024	Aspire Academy Stadium, Doha	Saudi Arabia	0–2	29'	International Friendly
3	29 May 2025	Champville Stadium, Beirut	Lebanon	1–1	17'	International Friendly
4	1 June 2025	Fouad Chehab Stadium, Jounieh	Lebanon	1–2	70'	International Friendly

== International goals ==
No.	Date	Venue	Opponent	Score	Result	Competition
3.	3 June 2026	Petra Stadium, Amman, Jordan	Malaysia	1–0	2–0	Friendly
