= Sara Kord =

Palestinian footballer (born 2005)

Sara Kord سَارَة زَكَرِيَّا إِسْمَاعِيل الْكُرْد
Personal information
- Full name: Sara Zakaria Ismail Kord
- Date of birth: 5 February 2005 (age 21)
- Place of birth: Jerusalem, Israel
- Position: Defender

Team information
- Current team: Al Ahly
- Number: 3

Senior career*
Years	Team	Apps	(Gls)
2021–2024	Hapoel Katamon Jerusalem		
2024–	Al Ahly	4	(0)

International career^{‡}
2023	Palestine U20	2	(0)
2023–	Palestine	10	(1)
- * Club domestic league appearances and goals ‡ National team caps and goals as of 29 November 2024

Sara Zakaria Ismail Kord (Arabic: سَارَة زَكَرِيَّا إِسْمَاعِيل الْكُرْد; Hebrew: סארה כורד; born 5 February 2005) is a professional footballer who plays as a defender for Egyptian Women's Premier League club Al Ahly. Born in Jerusalem, she holds dual Israeli and Palestinian citizenships and plays for the Palestine national team.

== Club career ==
Kord played for Ligat Nashim side Hapoel Katamon Jerusalem.

In September 2024, Al Ahly's newly formed women's team announced the signing of Kord.

== International career ==
In July 2023, she received her first call-up to the Palestine senior team for two friendly matches against Lebanon. On 4 June 2024, she scored her first international goal against Bahrain to secure a win for the Fedayeen in their second match.

=== International goals ===
No.	Date	Venue	Opponent	Score	Result	Competition
1.	4 June 2024	Al Ahli Stadium, Manama, Bahrain	Bahrain	2–1	2–1	Friendly
