= Palestine women's national football team =

Women's national association football team representing Palestine

Palestine
- Nickname(s): الفدائيات (The Fedayeen)
- Association: Palestinian Football Association
- Confederation: AFC (Asia)
- Sub-confederation: WAFF (West Asia)
- Head coach: Ahmed Sharf
- Captain: Sireen Ghattas
- FIFA code: PLE
| First colours | Second colours |

FIFA ranking
- Current: 127 ▲2 (20 October 2026)
- Highest: 84 (December 2013)
- Lowest: 136 (December 2023 – March 2024; March 2025)

First international
- Jordan 9–0 Palestine (Amman, Jordan, 23 September 2005)

Biggest win
- Qatar 0–18 Palestine (Manama, Bahrain, 20 October 2010)

Biggest defeat
- Jordan 10–0 Palestine (Abu Dhabi, United Arab Emirates; 26 February 2010); Jordan 10–0 Palestine (Amman, Jordan; 19 April 2014); Palestine 0–10 North Korea (Dushanbe, Tajikistan; 2 July 2025)

WAFF Championship
- Appearances: 7 (first in 2005)
- Best result: Runners-up (2014, 2025 )

The Palestine women's national football team (Arabic: المنتخب الفلسطيني لكرة القدم النسائي) represents Palestine in international women's football competitions. The team was established by Samar Araj in 2003 and is controlled by the Palestinian Football Association (PFA), the governing body for football in Palestine.

Palestine played their first match in 2005 against Jordan in a 9–0 defeat at the WAFF Women's Championship. Five years later, they entered their first AFC Women's Asian cup Qualification. Although Palestine didn't make it to the final tournament, they recorded their first international win during the qualification campaign with a 4–0 win against the Maldives.

Whilst the team has yet to qualify for any major international tournament, they participated in seven (out of eight) WAFF Women's Championship editions. Their best performance came in 2014 when they finished as runners-up, marking their highest achievement to date.

== History ==
On 15 May 2024 the Palestine women's national team played an unofficial friendly game against Irish club Bohemians in Dublin, Ireland, winning 2–1. The game marked the first time any senior Palestine national team played a game in Europe.

== Results and fixtures ==
The following is a list of match results in the last 12 months, as well as any future matches that have been scheduled.

Legend

Win Draw Lose Fixture

=== 2025 ===
| 24 November 2025 2025 WAFF Championship GS | Palestine | 0–3 | Jordan | Jeddah, Saudi Arabia |
| 16:45 UTC+3 | | Report | Sweilem 18'; Feras 39'; Al-Bitar 66' | Stadium: Hall Stadium – King Abdullah Sports City; Referee: Doumouh Al-Bakkar (Lebanon) |

| 26 November 2025 2025 WAFF Championship GS | Lebanon | 0–3 | Palestine | Jeddah, Saudi Arabia |
| 19:45 UTC+3 | | Report | Kord 11'; Sansur 23'; Qassis 56' | Stadium: Hall Stadium – King Abdullah Sports City; Referee: Alesar Baddour (Syria) |

| 30 November 2025 2025 WAFF Championship SF | Saudi Arabia | 0–0 (3–4 p) | Palestine | Jeddah, Saudi Arabia |
| 19:45 UTC+3 | | Report | | Stadium: Hall Stadium – King Abdullah Sports City; Attendance: 610; Referee: Said Al-Mezeini (Oman) |
| | Penalties |
| | Mukhayzin (penalty scored); Abdulrazak (penalty scored); Ibrahim (penalty missed); Tawfiq (penalty missed); Al-Omaysi (penalty scored) | | (penalty scored) Youssef; (penalty scored) Asad-Halim; (penalty missed) Osorio; (penalty scored) Sabat; (penalty scored) Nasr |

| 2 December 2025 2025 WAFF Championship F | Palestine | 1–3 | Jordan | Jeddah, Saudi Arabia |
| 19:45 | Youssef 85' | Report | Akroush 15'; Al-Majali 30' (pen.); F. Abu Tayeh 64' | Stadium: Prince Abdullah Al-Faisal Sports City Stadium; Referee: Said Al-Mezeini (Oman) |

=== 2026 ===
| 6 June 2026 Friendly | Malaysia | 0–2 | Palestine | Amman, Jordan |
| 18:00 UTC+2 | | | Saavedra 60'; Asad-Halim 62' | Stadium: Petra Stadium; Referee: Esraa Al-Mbaiden (Jordan) |

| 9 June 2026 Friendly | Jordan | 1–0 | Palestine | Amman, Jordan |
| 18:00 UTC+2 | Jbarah 46' (pen.) | Report | | Stadium: King Abdullah Stadium |

| 10 October 2026 Friendly | Lebanon | 1–1 | Palestine | Jounieh, Lebanon |
| 14:00 UTC+3 | Iskandar 79' | Report | Abu Asfar 4' | Stadium: Fouad Chehab Stadium; Referee: Doumouh Al Bakkar (Lebanon) |

| 13 October 2026 Friendly | Lebanon | 2–1 | Palestine | Jounieh, Lebanon |
| 14:00 UTC+3 | Salha 26'; Maalouf 33' | Report | Al Shaikh 86' | Stadium: Fouad Chehab Stadium; Referee: Karim Chehade (Lebanon) |

== Coaching staff ==
=== Current coaching staff ===
| Position | Name |
|---|---|
| Team manager | (Palestine) Dima Said |
| Head coach | (Palestine) Ahmed Sharf |
| Assistant coach | (Palestine) Ahmad Hammad |
| Goal Keeper coach | (Palestine) Saed Manasra |
| Physiotherapist | (Palestine) Sabreen Owda |

=== Historical ===
- (Palestine) Hani Al Majdoubah (2009–2013)
- (Palestine) Nasser Beitello (2014)
- (Palestine) Abdul Fattah Arar (2017)
- (Palestine) Ahmed Sharf (2018)
- (Palestine) Raed Al Khdour (2019)
- (Palestine) Simon Khair (2021)
- (Palestine) Nasser Beitello (2022–2025)
- (Palestine) Ahmed Sharf (2025–present)

== Players ==
=== Current squad ===
The following players were called up for the 2026 AFC Women's Asian Cup qualification matches against Uzbekistan and another opponent in June 2025.

Information correct as of 23 June 2025.

| No. | Pos. | Player | Date of birth (age) | Club |
|---|---|---|---|---|
| | GK | Charlotte Phillips | 24 June 2005 (age 21) | (Canadian Soccer Association) Vaughan SC |
| | GK | Mirave Marouf | 14 January 2006 (age 20) | (Jordan Football Association) Nashama Al-Mustaqbal |
| | GK | Guevara Alsheikh | | (United States Soccer Federation) Moraine Valley |
| | DF | Sara Kord | 5 February 2005 (age 21) | (Egyptian Football Association) Al Ahly |
| | DF | Sireen Ghattas (captain) | 29 May 2001 (age 25) | (Egyptian Football Association) Al Ahly |
| | DF | Pia Kassis | 26 September 2008 (age 18) | (Lebanese Football Association) Beirut Football Academy |
| | DF | Dalia Asad Halim | | (United States Soccer Federation) San Francisco Dons |
| | DF | Nagham Shebat | | (Turkish Football Federation) Çekmeköy BilgiDoğa |
| | DF | Rand Halawani | | (Jordan Football Association) Nashama Al-Mustaqbal |
| | MF | Sara Shakhsher | 26 April 2004 (age 22) | (Palestinian Football Association) Saryyet Ramallah |
| | MF | Nadine Elias | 31 May 1995 (age 31) | Arraba |
| | MF | Dima Al Ramhe | 23 November 2001 (age 24) | Tamra |
| | MF | Nadine Mohamed | 7 October 2003 (age 23) | (Egyptian Football Association) Al Ahly |
| | MF | Ahlam-Laila Nasr | 4 November 2004 (age 22) | (Egyptian Football Association) Al Ahly |
| | MF | Naomi Phillips | 3 February 2007 (age 19) | (Canadian Soccer Association) Alliance United |
| | MF | Dina Abdeen | 21 November 2006 (age 19) | (United States Soccer Federation) South County |
| | MF | Rania Sansur | 24 April 2006 (age 20) | (Football Federation of Chile) CD Palestino |
| | MF | Zjada Baydass | 23 March 2004 (age 22) | (United States Soccer Federation) Highline College |
| | MF | Emily Ibrahim | 30 July 2003 (age 23) | |
| | FW | Hala Sarrawi | 14 February 2003 (age 23) | (Palestinian Football Association) Ittihad Nablus |
| | FW | Miral Qassis | 22 July 2006 (age 20) | (Egyptian Football Association) FC Masar |
| | FW | Florencia Saavedra | 4 April 2005 (age 21) | (United States Soccer Federation) McNeese Cowgirls |
| | FW | Nour Youssef | 18 July 2005 (age 21) | (German Football Association) Viktoria Berlin |
| | FW | Narin Abu Asfar | 12 January 2008 (age 18) | (Swedish Football Association) Rosengård |
| | FW | Malak Barakat | 16 March 2006 (age 20) | (Jordan Football Association) Nashama Al-Mustaqbal |
| | FW | Fadwa El Husseiny | 2003 (age 22–23) | (Egyptian Football Association) ZED |

=== Recent call-ups ===
The following players have been called up to the squad in the past 12 months.

| Pos. | Player | Date of birth (age) | Caps | Goals | Club | Latest call-up |

=== Previous squads ===
WAFF Women's Championship

- 2022 WAFF Women's Championship

== Competitive record ==
=== FIFA Women's World Cup ===
FIFA Women's World Cup record
| Year | Result | Position | GP | W | D* | L | GF | GA | GD |
|---|---|---|---|---|---|---|---|---|---|
| (United States) 2003 | Did not enter | | | | | | | | |
| (China) 2007 | Did not enter | | | | | | | | |
| (Germany) 2011 | Did not qualify | | | | | | | | |
| (Canada) 2015 | Did not qualify | | | | | | | | |
| (France) 2019 | Did not qualify | | | | | | | | |
| (Australia) (New Zealand) 2023 | Did not qualify | | | | | | | | |
| (Brazil) 2027 | Did not qualify | | | | | | | | |
| (Costa Rica) (Jamaica) (Mexico) (United States) 2031 | To be determined | | | | | | | | |
| (United Kingdom) 2035 | To be determined | | | | | | | | |
| Total | 0/6 | – | – | – | – | – | – | – | – |

*Draws include knockout matches decided on penalty kicks.

=== Olympic Games ===
Summer Olympics record
| Year | Result | GP | W | D* | L | GS | GA | GD |
|---|---|---|---|---|---|---|---|---|
| (United States) 1996 | Did not enter | | | | | | | |
| (Australia) 2000 | Did not enter | | | | | | | |
| (Greece) 2004 | Did not enter | | | | | | | |
| (China) 2008 | Did not enter | | | | | | | |
| (United Kingdom) 2012 | Did not qualify | | | | | | | |
| (Brazil) 2016 | Did not qualify | | | | | | | |
| (Japan) 2020 | Did not qualify | | | | | | | |
| (France) 2024 | Withdrew | | | | | | | |
| (United States) 2028 | Did not qualify | | | | | | | |
| Total | 0/7 | | | | | | | |

*Draws include knockout matches decided on penalty kicks.

=== AFC Women's Asian Cup ===
AFC Women's Asian Cup record
| Year | Result | GP | W | D* | L | GF | GA | GD |
|---|---|---|---|---|---|---|---|---|
| (Thailand) 2003 | Did not enter | | | | | | | |
| (Australia) 2006 | Did not enter | | | | | | | |
| (Vietnam) 2008 | Did not enter | | | | | | | |
| (China) 2010 | Did not qualify | | | | | | | |
| (Vietnam) 2014 | Did not qualify | | | | | | | |
| (Jordan) 2018 | Did not qualify | | | | | | | |
| (India) 2022 | Did not qualify | | | | | | | |
| (Australia) 2026 | Did not qualify | | | | | | | |
| Total | 0/8 | – | – | – | – | – | – | – |

*Draws include knockout matches decided on penalty kicks.

=== WAFF Women's Championship ===
| Hosts / Year | Result | GP | W | D* | L | GS | GA | GD |
|---|---|---|---|---|---|---|---|---|
| (Jordan) 2005 | 5th place | 4 | 0 | 1 | 3 | 1 | 21 | −20 |
| (Jordan) 2007 | Did not enter | | | | | | | |
| (United Arab Emirates) 2010 | 4th place | 4 | 1 | 0 | 3 | 19 | 17 | +2 |
| (United Arab Emirates) 2011 | Group stage | 3 | 1 | 0 | 2 | 4 | 16 | −12 |
| (Jordan) 2014 | Runners-up | 3 | 2 | 0 | 1 | 8 | 10 | −2 |
| (Bahrain) 2019 | 5th place | 4 | 0 | 1 | 3 | 0 | 11 | −11 |
| (Jordan) 2022 | 4th place | 3 | 0 | 1 | 2 | 1 | 8 | −7 |
| (Saudi Arabia) 2024 | Semi-finalist | 4 | 2 | 0 | 2 | 4 | 9 | −5 |
| (Saudi Arabia) 2025 | Runners-up | 4 | 1 | 1 | 2 | 4 | 6 | −2 |
| Total | 8/9 | 29 | 7 | 4 | 18 | 41 | 98 | −57 |

*Draws include knockout matches decided on penalty kicks.

=== Arab Women's Championship ===
| Hosts / Year | Result | GP | W | D* | L | GS | GA | GD |
|---|---|---|---|---|---|---|---|---|
| (Egypt) 2006 | Group stage | 3 | 0 | 0 | 3 | 1 | 15 | −14 |
| (Egypt) 2021 | Group stage | 2 | 0 | 0 | 2 | 2 | 8 | −6 |

=== Arabia Cup ===
| Hosts / Year | Result | GP | W | D* | L | GS | GA | GD |
|---|---|---|---|---|---|---|---|---|
| (Bahrain) 2010 | 4th place | 5 | 2 | 0 | 3 | 24 | 14 | +10 |

== See also ==
- Sport in Palestine
- Football in the State of Palestine
- Palestine women's national under-20 football team
- Palestine men's national football team
