= Iraq women's national football team =

Women's national association football team representing Iraq

Iraq
- Nickname(s): لبوات الرافدين (Lionesses of Mesopotamia)
- Association: Iraq Football Association
- Confederation: AFC (Asia)
- Sub-confederation: WAFF (West Asia)
- Head coach: Abdul-Wahab Abu Al-Hail
- Top scorer: Nur Al-Jawahiri (5)
- FIFA code: IRQ
First colours	Second colours	Third colours

FIFA ranking
- Current: 166 (16 June 2026)
- Highest: 107 (December 2017 – March 2018)
- Lowest: 173 (December 2024 – June 2025)

First international
- Jordan 20–0 Iraq (Riffa, Bahrain; 19 October 2010)

Biggest win
- Iraq 5–2 Mongolia (Chiang Mai, Thailand; 26 June 2025); United Arab Emirates 0–3 Iraq (Jeddah, Saudi Arabia; 26 November 2025)

Biggest defeat
- Jordan 20–0 Iraq (Riffa, Bahrain; 19 October 2010)

WAFF Championship
- Appearances: 3 (first in 2011)
- Best result: 3rd place (2025)

The Iraq women's national football team is the female representative football team for Iraq.

== History ==
The Iraq women's team has its roots in futsal, a game with some similarities to football, played on an indoor court. Futsal has been more accessible to women in Iraq than football, and the Iraq Football Association has organized futsal tournaments with the intention to develop some of the players into football players.

The team played its first international match in 2010. Iraq's first participation in a women's major football tournament was the 2018 AFC Women's Asian Cup qualification.

== Results and fixtures ==
The following is a list of match results in the last 12 months, as well as any future matches that have been scheduled.

Legend

Win Draw Loss Void or postponed Fixture

=== 2025 ===
24 November 2025 2025 WAFF Championship GS	Iraq	1–2	Saudi Arabia	Jeddah, Saudi Arabia
19:45 UTC+3	Al-Jawahiri 90+7'	Report	Mukhayzin 41' (pen.); Abualsamh 90+5'	Stadium: Hall Stadium – King Abdullah Sports City; Referee: Esraa Al-Mbaiden (Jordan)

26 November 2025 2025 WAFF Championship GS	United Arab Emirates	0–3	Iraq	Jeddah, Saudi Arabia
16:45 UTC+3		Report	Omar 20'; Al-Jawahiri 47'; Salihi 90+5'	Stadium: Hall Stadium – King Abdullah Sports City; Referee: Yasmin Nairoukh (Palestine)

30 November 2025 2025 WAFF Championship SF	Jordan	3–0	Iraq	Jeddah, Saudi Arabia
16:45 UTC+3	Al-Majali 54'; Abu Tayeh 84'; Al-Btoush 90+1'	Report		Stadium: Hall Stadium – King Abdullah Sports City; Referee: Mohammed Al-Manii (Oman)

2 December 2025 2025 WAFF Championship 3rd	Saudi Arabia	2–2 (2–4 p)	Iraq	Jeddah, Saudi Arabia
16:45 UTC+3	Abdullah 17'; Abdulrazak 62'	Report	Salihi 41'; Al-Balahi 53'	Stadium: Al-Faisal Stadium; Referee: Mohammed Al-Manii (Oman)
	Penalties
	Mukhayzin (penalty missed); Abdulrazak (penalty scored); Hanafi (penalty missed); Tawfiq (penalty scored)		(penalty scored) Al-Ghazawi; (penalty scored) Al-Balahi; (penalty scored) Abuzer; (penalty scored) Al-Jawahiri

== Coaching staff ==
Position	Name
Head coach	(Iraq) Abdul-Wahab Abu Al-Hail
Assistant coaches	(Iraq) Naji Kadhem
Assistant coaches	(Iraq) Walid Dhahed
Goalkeeping coach	(Iraq) Abed Karim Souhail
Fitness coach	(Iraq)
Match analyst	(Iraq)
Physiotherapist	(Iraq)
Chief medical officer	(Iraq) Abdul Karim Al-Saffar
Team doctor	(Iraq)
Team manager	(Iraq)
Media coordinator	(Iraq) Mohammed Imad Zubair
Security coordinator	(Iraq) Omar Kadhim
Kitman	(Iraq) Haqi Ibrahim

=== Manager history ===
- (Iraq) Saleh Radhi (20??–2024)
- (Iraq) Abdul-Wahab Abu Al-Hail (2024–present)

== Players ==
=== Current squad ===
The following players were called up for the 2025 WAFF Women's Championship, held in Jeddah, Saudi Arabia between 24 November and 2 December 2025.

No.	Pos.	Player	Date of birth (age)	Club
1	GK	Khalat Al-Zebari	12 August 1996 (age 30)	
2	DF	Rozhin Abuzer		
3	DF	Shanga Khaledbaziani		
4	DF	Helen Tawfeeq		(Swedish Football Association) RIK Karlskoga
5	DF	Awaz Mohammed		
6		Laveen Thabit		
7	FW	Nur Al-Jawahiri	23 July 2003 (age 23)	(Royal Dutch Football Association) Sparta Rotterdam
8	MF	Tbarek Al-Ghazawi		
9		Mina Omar		(Norwegian Football Federation) Ranheim Kvinner
10	FW	Shokhan Salihi	10 April 2000 (age 26)	(Saudi Arabian Football Federation) Al-Nassr
11	MF	Przha Shawkat		
12		Roos Hami		
14	DF	Nadia Al-Balahi (Captain)	28 April 1995 (age 31)	
15	MF	Dyana Dawood	4 May 1999 (age 27)	(United States Soccer Federation) Next Level Soccer
16	MF	Tiba Al-Quraishi	13 January 1996 (age 30)	
17	MF	Rawan Khalid		
18		Aryam Al-Zuhairi		(Jordan Football Association) Nashama Al-Mustaqbal
19		Sara Anwer		
20		Zainab Al-Dawoodi		
21		Hanin Sahi		
22	GK	Salar Khalid		
23		Marwa Ihsan		

=== Recent call-ups ===
The following players have been called up to the Iraq squad in the past 12 months.

Pos.	Player	Date of birth (age)	Caps	Goals	Club	Latest call-up

== Records ==
*Active players in bold, statistics correct as of 19 September 2021.

=== Most capped players ===
#	Player	Year(s)	Caps

=== Top goalscorers ===
#	Player	Year(s)	Goals	Caps

== Competitive record ==
=== FIFA Women's World Cup ===
FIFA Women's World Cup record
Year	Result	Position	GP	W	D*	L	GF	GA	GD
(China) 1991 to (Canada) 2015	Did not enter								
(France) 2019	Did not qualify								
(Australia) (New Zealand) 2023	Withdrew								
(Brazil) 2027	Did not qualify								
(Costa Rica) (Jamaica) (Mexico) (United States) 2031	To be determined								
(United Kingdom) 2035	To be determined								
Total	0/12	-	-	-	-	-	-	-	-

*Draws include knockout matches decided on penalty kicks.

=== AFC Women's Asian Cup ===
AFC Women's Asian Cup record
Finals record									Qualification record					
Year	Result	Position	GP	W	D*	L	GF	GA	GP	W	D	L	GF	GA
(Hong Kong) 1975 to (Vietnam) 2014	Did not enter								Did not enter					
(Jordan) 2018	Did not qualify								5	0	0	5	0	22
(India) 2022	Withdrew								Withdrew					
(Australia) 2026	Did not qualify								3	1	1	1	5	9
(Uzbekistan) 2029
Total	0/20	0/0	0	0	0	0	0	0	7	1	1	6	5	31

*Draws include knockout matches decided on penalty kicks.

=== WAFF Women's Championship ===
WAFF Women's Championship record
Hosts / Year	Result	GP	W	D*	L	GS	GA	GD
(Jordan) 2005	Did not enter							
(Jordan) 2007	Did not enter							
(United Arab Emirates) 2010	Did not enter							
(United Arab Emirates) 2011	Group stage	3	0	0	3	0	19	−19
(Jordan) 2014	Did not enter							
(Bahrain) 2019	Did not enter							
(Jordan) 2022	Did not enter							
(Saudi Arabia) 2024	Group stage	3	0	0	3	0	11	−11
(Saudi Arabia) **2025**	**3rd place**	**4**	**1**	**1**	**2**	**6**	**7**	**−1**
Total	3/9	10	1	1	8	6	37	−31

*Draws include knockout matches decided on penalty kicks.

=== Arabia Women's Cup ===
Arabia Women's Cup record
Hosts / Year	Result	GP	W	D*	L	GS	GA	GD
(Bahrain) 2010	Group stage	3	0	0	3	0	44	−44

== Head-to-head record ==
Against	Played	Won	Drawn	Lost	GF	GA
Total	28	2	2	24	12	106

- Source: Worldfootball

== See also ==
- Iraq national football team
- Iraq national under-23 football team
- Iraq national under-20 football team
- Iraq national under-17 football team
- Iraq women's national under-20 football team
- Iraq women's national under-17 football team
