= 2014 AFC Women's Asian Cup squads =

List of players competing at the 18th edition of the AFC Women's Asian Cup

This article lists the squads for the 2014 AFC Women's Asian Cup, the 18th edition of the AFC Women's Asian Cup. The tournament is a quadrennial women's international football tournament for national teams in Asia organised by the Asian Football Confederation (AFC), and was held in Vietnam from 14 to 25 May 2014. In the tournament there were involved eight national teams. Each national team registered a final squad of 23 players, with the option of submitting a preliminary squad of 18–50 players. Following an amendment to regulations, the AFC permitted nations to register 25 players for the final squad.

The age listed for each player is on 14 May 2014, the first day of the tournament. The numbers of caps and goals listed for each player do not include any matches played after the start of tournament. The club listed is the club for which the player last played a competitive match prior to the tournament. The nationality for each club reflects the national association (not the league) to which the club is affiliated. A flag is included for coaches that are of a different nationality than their own national team.

== Group A ==
=== Australia ===
The 23-player squad was announced on 6 May. On 12 May, Emma Checker and Amy Harrison were added to the squad.

Head coach: Alen Stajcic

No.	Pos.	Player	Date of birth (age)	Caps	Goals	Club
1	GK	Brianna Davey	13 January 1995 (aged 19)	8	0	(Football Australia) Melbourne Victory
2	DF	Teigen Allen	12 February 1994 (aged 20)	27	0	(Football Australia) Western Sydney Wanderers
3	DF	Kim Carroll	2 September 1987 (aged 26)	51	2	(Football Australia) Brisbane Roar
4	DF	Clare Polkinghorne (captain)	1 February 1989 (aged 25)	66	3	(Football Australia) Brisbane Roar
5	DF	Laura Alleway	28 November 1989 (aged 24)	17	0	(Football Australia) Brisbane Roar
6	FW	Leena Khamis	19 June 1986 (aged 27)	19	5	(Football Australia) Sydney FC
7	FW	Hayley Raso	5 September 1994 (aged 19)	4	0	(Football Australia) Brisbane Roar
8	MF	Elise Kellond-Knight	10 August 1990 (aged 23)	36	0	(Football Australia) Brisbane Roar
9	FW	Caitlin Foord	11 November 1994 (aged 19)	15	1	(United States Soccer Federation) Sky Blue
10	MF	Emily van Egmond	12 July 1993 (aged 20)	21	4	(Football Australia) Western Sydney Wanderers
11	FW	Lisa De Vanna	14 November 1984 (aged 29)	84	31	(United States Soccer Federation) Boston Breakers
12	FW	Kate Gill	10 December 1984 (aged 29)	73	37	(Football Australia) Perth Glory
13	MF	Tameka Butt	16 June 1991 (aged 22)	34	6	(Football Australia) Brisbane Roar
14	DF	Alanna Kennedy	21 January 1995 (aged 19)	12	0	(Football Australia) Western Sydney Wanderers
15	MF	Nicola Bolger	3 March 1993 (aged 21)	1	0	(Football Australia) Sydney FC
16	DF	Stephanie Catley	26 January 1994 (aged 20)	16	1	(Football Australia) Melbourne Victory
17	MF	Teresa Polias	16 May 1990 (aged 23)	2	0	(Football Australia) Sydney FC
18	GK	Lydia Williams	13 May 1988 (aged 26)	34	0	(United States Soccer Federation) Western New York Flash
19	MF	Katrina Gorry	13 August 1992 (aged 21)	11	3	(Football Australia) Brisbane Roar
20	MF	Sam Kerr	10 September 1993 (aged 20)	27	3	(United States Soccer Federation) Western New York Flash
21	GK	Casey Dumont	25 January 1992 (aged 22)	0	0	(Football Australia) Sydney FC
22	MF	Ashleigh Sykes	15 December 1991 (aged 22)	5	2	(Football Australia) Canberra United
23	FW	Michelle Heyman	4 July 1988 (aged 25)	14	4	(Football Australia) Canberra United
24	DF	Emma Checker	11 March 1996 (aged 18)	1	0	(Football Australia) Melbourne Victory
25	MF	Amy Harrison	21 April 1996 (aged 18)	0	0	(Football Australia) Sydney FC

=== Japan ===
The 23-player squad was announced on 2 May. A day later, Michi Goto and Ami Sugita were added to the squad. On 8 May, Kana Osafune withdrew due to injury and was replaced by Yuria Obara.

Head coach: Norio Sasaki

No.	Pos.	Player	Date of birth (age)	Caps	Goals	Club
1	GK	Miho Fukumoto (captain)	2 October 1983 (aged 30)	71	0	(Japan Football Association) Okayama Yunogo Belle
2	DF	Saori Ariyoshi	1 November 1987 (aged 26)	18	0	(Japan Football Association) NTV Beleza
3	DF	Azusa Iwashimizu	14 October 1986 (aged 27)	100	8	(Japan Football Association) NTV Beleza
4	DF	Yuria Obara	4 September 1990 (aged 23)	0	0	(Japan Football Association) Albirex Niigata
5	DF	Megumi Kamionobe	15 March 1986 (aged 28)	25	2	(Japan Football Association) Albirex Niigata
6	MF	Mizuho Sakaguchi	15 October 1987 (aged 26)	72	18	(Japan Football Association) NTV Beleza
7	FW	Karina Maruyama	26 March 1983 (aged 31)	78	14	(Japan Football Association) Speranza Osaka
8	MF	Aya Miyama	28 January 1985 (aged 29)	132	32	(Japan Football Association) Okayama Yunogo Belle
9	MF	Nahomi Kawasumi	23 September 1985 (aged 28)	55	12	(United States Soccer Federation) Seattle Reign
10	MF	Homare Sawa	6 September 1978 (aged 35)	193	81	(Japan Football Association) INAC Kobe Leonessa
11	FW	Chinatsu Kira	5 July 1991 (aged 22)	1	0	(Japan Football Association) Urawa Reds
12	MF	Emi Nakajima	27 September 1990 (aged 23)	11	1	(Japan Football Association) INAC Kobe Leonessa
13	FW	Megumi Takase	10 November 1990 (aged 23)	40	6	(Japan Football Association) INAC Kobe Leonessa
14	MF	Nanase Kiryu	31 October 1989 (aged 24)	8	0	(United States Soccer Federation) Sky Blue
15	FW	Yuika Sugasawa	5 October 1990 (aged 23)	13	3	(Japan Football Association) JEF United
16	MF	Hikaru Naomoto	3 March 1994 (aged 20)	1	0	(Japan Football Association) Urawa Reds
17	FW	Yūki Ōgimi	15 July 1987 (aged 26)	107	48	(The Football Association) Chelsea
18	GK	Ayumi Kaihori	4 September 1986 (aged 27)	41	0	(Japan Football Association) INAC Kobe Leonessa
19	DF	Rumi Utsugi	5 December 1988 (aged 25)	67	5	(French Football Federation) Montpellier
20	MF	Yuri Kawamura	17 May 1989 (aged 24)	5	0	(Japan Football Association) Vegalta Sendai
21	GK	Erina Yamane	20 December 1990 (aged 23)	7	0	(Japan Football Association) JEF United
22	DF	Ruka Norimatsu	30 January 1996 (aged 18)	1	0	(Japan Football Association) Urawa Reds
23	DF	Shiho Kohata	12 November 1989 (aged 24)	0	0	(Japan Football Association) Urawa Reds
24	MF	Ami Sugita	14 March 1992 (aged 22)	0	0	(Japan Football Association) Iga
25	FW	Michi Goto	26 July 1990 (aged 23)	4	2	(Japan Football Association) Urawa Reds

=== Jordan ===
The 23-player squad was announced on 5 May 2014.

Head coach: (Japan) Masahiko Okiyama

No.	Pos.	Player	Date of birth (age)	Caps	Goals	Club
1	GK	Zina Al-Sadi	22 February 1994 (aged 20)			(Jordan Football Association) Shabab Al-Ordon
2	DF	Haya Khalil	12 September 1994 (aged 19)			
3	FW	Zean Bello	17 May 1997 (aged 16)			
4	MF	Luna Al-Masri	9 March 1994 (aged 20)			(Jordan Football Association) Shabab Al-Ordon
5	FW	Anfal Al-Sufy	14 October 1995 (aged 18)			
6	FW	Razan Al-Zagha	23 March 1995 (aged 19)			
7	DF	Yasmeen Khair	29 June 1987 (aged 26)			(Jordan Football Association) Shabab Al-Ordon
8	MF	Stephanie Al-Naber (captain)	12 July 1987 (aged 26)			(Jordan Football Association) Shabab Al-Ordon
9	FW	Abeer Al-Nahar	13 February 1991 (aged 23)			(Jordan Football Association) Amman SC
10	FW	Shatha Assahwneh	31 December 1992 (aged 21)			
11	FW	Maysa Jbarah	20 September 1989 (aged 24)			(Jordan Football Association) Amman SC
12	GK	Tareiza Al-Oudat	3 December 1992 (aged 21)			
13	DF	Ala'a Abu-Kasheh	23 April 1989 (aged 25)			(Jordan Football Association) Shabab Al-Ordon
14	DF	Enshirah Al-Hyasat	25 November 1991 (aged 22)			(Jordan Football Association) Amman SC
15	FW	Aida Al-Sufy	20 May 1994 (aged 19)			
16	MF	Shahnaz Jebreen	28 July 1992 (aged 21)			(Jordan Football Association) Amman SC
17	MF	Sama'a Khraisat	15 August 1991 (aged 22)			(Jordan Football Association) Shabab Al-Ordon
18	DF	Hebah Fakhereddin	19 November 1990 (aged 23)			
19	DF	Ayah Al-Majali	9 March 1992 (aged 22)			(Jordan Football Association) Shabab Al-Ordon
20	MF	Shorooq Shathli	6 January 1987 (aged 27)			(Jordan Football Association) Shabab Al-Ordon
21	GK	Sherin Al-Shalabe	3 June 1994 (aged 19)			(Jordan Football Association) Shabab Al-Ordon
22	FW	Maysam Abu-Khashabeh	18 May 1993 (aged 20)			
23	FW	Rima Yassen	1 August 1995 (aged 18)			

=== Vietnam ===
Head coach: (China) Chen Yunfa

No.	Pos.	Player	Date of birth (age)	Caps	Goals	Club
1	GK	Đặng Thị Kiều Trinh	19 December 1985 (aged 28)			(Vietnam Football Federation) Hồ Chí Minh City I W.F.C.
2	DF	Nguyễn Thị Xuyến	6 September 1987 (aged 26)			(Vietnam Football Federation) Hà Nội I W.F.C.
3	DF	Chương Thị Kiều	19 August 1995 (aged 18)			(Vietnam Football Federation) Hồ Chí Minh City I W.F.C.
4	DF	Nguyễn Thị Nga	9 May 1985 (aged 29)			(Vietnam Football Federation) Hà Nội I W.F.C.
5	DF	Bùi Thị Như	10 June 1990 (aged 23)			(Vietnam Football Federation) Phong Phú Hà Nam W.F.C.
6	MF	Phạm Hoàng Quỳnh	20 September 1992 (aged 21)			
7	MF	Nguyễn Thị Tuyết Dung	13 December 1993 (aged 20)			
8	FW	Nguyễn Thị Minh Nguyệt	16 November 1986 (aged 27)			
9	MF	Trần Thị Thùy Trang	8 August 1988 (aged 25)			
10	FW	Nguyễn Thị Hòa	27 July 1990 (aged 23)			
11	FW	Nguyễn Thị Nguyệt	5 November 1992 (aged 21)			
12	DF	Vũ Thị Nhung	9 July 1992 (aged 21)			
13	MF	Nguyễn Thị Muôn	7 October 1988 (aged 25)			
14	GK	Lê Thị Tuyết Mai	15 December 1985 (aged 28)			
15	DF	Nguyễn Thị Ngọc Ánh	23 February 1985 (aged 29)			
16	MF	Lê Thị Thương (captain)	23 December 1984 (aged 29)			
17	DF	Nguyễn Hải Hòa	22 December 1989 (aged 24)			
18	MF	Nguyễn Thị Liễu	12 September 1992 (aged 21)			
19	DF	Trần Thị Hồng Nhung	28 October 1992 (aged 21)			(Vietnam Football Federation) Phong Phú Hà Nam W.F.C.
20	DF	Nguyễn Thị Mai	14 June 1990 (aged 23)			
21	GK	Trần Thị Kim Thanh	18 September 1993 (aged 20)			(Vietnam Football Federation) Hồ Chí Minh City I W.F.C.
22	FW	Lê Thu Thanh Hương	21 September 1991 (aged 22)			(Vietnam Football Federation) Phong Phú Hà Nam W.F.C.
23	DF	Trần Thị Kim Hồng	26 January 1985 (aged 29)			(Vietnam Football Federation) Hồ Chí Minh City I W.F.C.

== Group B ==
=== China ===
Head coach: Hao Wei

No.	Pos.	Player	Date of birth (age)	Caps	Goals	Club
1	GK	Zhang Yue	30 September 1990 (aged 23)			
2	DF	Liu Shanshan	16 March 1992 (aged 22)			
3	DF	Wang Lingling	18 June 1988 (aged 25)			
4	DF	Li Jiayue	8 June 1990 (aged 23)			
5	DF	Wu Haiyan (captain)	26 February 1993 (aged 21)			
6	DF	Li Dongna	6 December 1988 (aged 25)			
7	MF	Xu Yanlu	16 September 1991 (aged 22)			
8	MF	Huang Yini	7 January 1993 (aged 21)			
9	FW	Lou Jiahui	26 May 1991 (aged 22)			
10	FW	Li Ying	7 January 1993 (aged 21)			
11	FW	Yang Li	31 January 1991 (aged 23)			
12	GK	Chi Xiaohui	9 February 1989 (aged 25)			
13	FW	Gao Qi	21 August 1991 (aged 22)			
14	FW	Gu Yasha	28 November 1990 (aged 23)			
15	MF	Li Xianglin	14 September 1989 (aged 24)			
16	MF	Wang Chen	24 October 1989 (aged 24)			
17	MF	Zhang Xin	23 May 1992 (aged 21)			
18	MF	Han Peng	20 December 1989 (aged 24)			
19	MF	Zhou Feifei	24 September 1987 (aged 26)			
20	MF	Zhang Rui	27 January 1989 (aged 25)			
21	MF	Wang Shanshan	27 January 1990 (aged 24)			
22	GK	Wang Yun	30 May 1989 (aged 24)			
23	MF	Ren Guixin	19 December 1988 (aged 25)			
24	FW	Zhao Rong	2 August 1991 (aged 22)			
25	FW	Ma Xiaoxu	5 June 1988 (aged 25)			

=== Myanmar ===
Head coach: Myat Myat Oo

No.	Pos.	Player	Date of birth (age)	Caps	Goals	Club
1	GK	Mya Phu Ngon	10 August 1989 (aged 24)			
2	DF	Khin Than Wai	2 November 1995 (aged 18)			
3	DF	Zin Mar Win	2 January 1990 (aged 24)			
4	DF	Moe Moe War (captain)	21 September 1984 (aged 29)			
5	DF	Phu Pwint Khaing	23 July 1989 (aged 24)			
6	DF	San San Maw	5 October 1980 (aged 33)			
7	MF	Than Than Htwe	24 July 1986 (aged 27)			
8	FW	Naw Ar Lo Wer Phaw	11 January 1988 (aged 26)			
9	FW	Yee Yee Oo	1 October 1990 (aged 23)			
10	FW	Khin Marlar Tun	21 May 1988 (aged 25)			
11	MF	Khin Moe Wai	16 December 1989 (aged 24)			
12	FW	Margret Marri	16 October 1986 (aged 27)			
13	FW	May Thu Kyaw	10 November 1995 (aged 18)			
14	DF	Aye Aye Moe	4 February 1995 (aged 19)			
15	FW	Nilar Win	19 March 1997 (aged 17)			
16	FW	Shwe Sin Aung	9 April 1990 (aged 24)			
17	DF	Myint Myint Aye	27 December 1988 (aged 25)			
18	MF	May Sabai Phoo	31 July 1996 (aged 17)			
19	DF	Zar Chi Oo	6 May 1988 (aged 26)			
20	GK	May Khin Ya Min	11 January 1986 (aged 28)			
21	FW	Yun Me Me Lwin	10 July 1997 (aged 16)			
22	MF	Nan Kyay Ngon	22 October 1987 (aged 26)			
23	MF	Win Theingi Tun	1 February 1995 (aged 19)			

=== South Korea ===
The 23-player squad was announced on 15 April.

Head coach: Yoon Deok-yeo

No.	Pos.	Player	Date of birth (age)	Caps	Goals	Club
1	GK	Jun Min-kyung	16 January 1985 (aged 29)	37	0	(Korea Football Association) Goyang Daekyo
2	DF	Seo Hyun-sook	6 January 1992 (aged 22)	9	0	(Korea Football Association) Goyang Daekyo
3	DF	Lee Eun-mi	18 August 1988 (aged 25)	57	12	(Korea Football Association) Goyang Daekyo
4	DF	Eo Hee-jin	21 March 1991 (aged 23)	1	0	(Korea Football Association) Seoul WFC
5	DF	Kim Do-yeon	7 December 1988 (aged 25)	40	0	(Korea Football Association) Incheon Hyundai Steel Red Angels
6	DF	Lim Seon-joo	27 November 1990 (aged 23)	28	1	(Korea Football Association) Incheon Hyundai Steel Red Angels
7	MF	Jeon Ga-eul	14 September 1988 (aged 25)	49	15	(Korea Football Association) Incheon Hyundai Steel Red Angels
8	MF	Cho So-hyun (captain)	24 June 1988 (aged 25)	59	3	(Korea Football Association) Incheon Hyundai Steel Red Angels
9	FW	Park Eun-sun	25 December 1986 (aged 27)	20	11	(Korea Football Association) Seoul WFC
10	FW	Ji So-yun	21 February 1991 (aged 23)	59	28	(The Football Association) Chelsea
11	MF	Kim Soo-yun	30 August 1989 (aged 24)	39	9	(Korea Football Association) Jeonbuk KSPO
12	FW	Yoo Young-a	15 April 1988 (aged 26)	40	17	(Korea Football Association) Incheon Hyundai Steel Red Angels
13	MF	Kwon Hah-nul	7 March 1988 (aged 26)	73	10	(Korea Football Association) Busan Sangmu
14	MF	Kim Na-rae	1 June 1990 (aged 23)	23	2	(Korea Football Association) Incheon Hyundai Steel Red Angels
15	MF	Park Hee-young	21 March 1991 (aged 23)	16	1	(Korea Football Association) Daejeon Sportstoto
16	MF	Lee Young-ju	22 April 1992 (aged 22)	0	0	(Korea Football Association) Busan Sangmu
17	FW	Yeo Min-ji	27 April 1993 (aged 21)	13	2	(Korea Football Association) Daejeon Sportstoto
18	GK	Kim Jung-mi	16 October 1984 (aged 29)	74	0	(Korea Football Association) Incheon Hyundai Steel Red Angels
19	DF	Song Su-ran	7 September 1990 (aged 23)	2	0	(Korea Football Association) Daejeon Sportstoto
20	DF	Kim Hye-ri	25 June 1990 (aged 23)	27	0	(Korea Football Association) Incheon Hyundai Steel Red Angels
21	GK	Min Yu-kyeong	9 June 1995 (aged 18)	0	0	(Korea Football Association) Hanyang University
22	MF	Lee So-dam	12 October 1994 (aged 19)	6	0	(Korea Football Association) Ulsan College
23	DF	Ahn Hye-in	14 August 1995 (aged 18)	4	0	(Korea Football Association) Uiduk University

=== Thailand ===
The 25-player squad was announced on 8 May.

Head coach: Nuengruethai Sathongwien

No.	Pos.	Player	Date of birth (age)	Caps	Goals	Club
1	GK	Waraporn Boonsing	16 February 1990 (aged 24)			(Football Association of Thailand) BG Bundit Asia
2	DF	Darut Changplook	3 February 1988 (aged 26)			(Football Association of Thailand) North Bangkok College
3	DF	Natthakarn Chinwong	15 March 1992 (aged 22)			(Football Association of Thailand) Khonkaen Sport School
4	DF	Duangnapa Sritala (captain)	4 February 1986 (aged 28)			(Football Association of Thailand) Bangkok-Thonburi
5	DF	Kwanruethai Kunupatham	19 October 1990 (aged 23)			(Football Association of Thailand) BG Bundit Asia
6	MF	Pikul Khueanpet	20 September 1988 (aged 25)			(Football Association of Thailand) BG Bundit Asia
7	MF	Silawan Intamee	22 January 1994 (aged 20)			(Football Association of Thailand) Chonburi Sriprathum
8	MF	Naphat Seesraum	11 May 1987 (aged 27)			(Japan Football Association) Speranza Osaka
9	DF	Warunee Phetwiset	13 December 1990 (aged 23)			(Football Association of Thailand) Chonburi Sriprathum
10	DF	Sunisa Srangthaisong	6 May 1988 (aged 26)			(Football Association of Thailand) BG Bundit Asia
11	MF	Ainon Phancha	27 January 1992 (aged 22)			(Football Association of Thailand) Chonburi Sriprathum
12	FW	Alisa Rukpinij	2 February 1995 (aged 19)			(Football Association of Thailand) Chonburi Sriprathum
13	MF	Orathai Srimanee	12 June 1988 (aged 25)			(Football Association of Thailand) BG Bundit Asia
14	MF	Supaporn Gaewbaen	4 March 1985 (aged 29)			(Football Association of Thailand) BG Bundit Asia
15	FW	Pajaree Thaoto	12 October 1992 (aged 21)			(Football Association of Thailand) BG Bundit Asia
16	DF	Khwanrudi Saengchan	16 May 1991 (aged 22)			(Football Association of Thailand) BG Bundit Asia
17	MF	Anootsara Maijarern	14 February 1986 (aged 28)			(Football Association of Thailand) Royal Thai Air Force
18	GK	Sukanya Chor Charoenying	24 November 1987 (aged 26)			(Football Association of Thailand) Royal Thai Air Force
19	FW	Taneekarn Dangda	15 December 1992 (aged 21)			(Football Association of Thailand) Bangkok-Thonburi
20	FW	Rattikan Thongsombut	7 July 1991 (aged 22)			(Football Association of Thailand) BG Bundit Asia
21	MF	Kanjana Sungngoen	21 September 1986 (aged 27)			(Japan Football Association) Speranza Osaka
22	GK	Yada Sengyong	10 September 1993 (aged 20)			(Football Association of Thailand) North Bangkok College
23	FW	Nisa Romyen	18 January 1990 (aged 24)			(Football Association of Thailand) North Bangkok College
24	MF	Jaruwan Chaiyarak	23 April 1990 (aged 24)			
25	MF	Dujdao Wahamongkon	14 April 1988 (aged 26)			
