= 2018 AFC Women's Asian Cup squads =

List of players competing at the 19th edition of the AFC Women's Asian Cup

This article lists the squads for the 2018 AFC Women's Asian Cup, the 19th edition of the AFC Women's Asian Cup. The tournament is a quadrennial women's international football tournament for national teams in Asia organised by the Asian Football Confederation (AFC), and was held in Jordan from 6 to 20 April 2018. In the tournament there were involved eight national teams. Each national team registered a final squad of 23 players, with the option of submitting a preliminary squad of 18–50 players. On 29 March 2018, the AFC announced the squads for teams of both the groups.

The age listed for each player is on 6 April 2018, the first day of the tournament. The numbers of caps and goals listed for each player do not include any matches played after the start of tournament. The club listed is the club for which the player last played a competitive match prior to the tournament. The nationality for each club reflects the national association (not the league) to which the club is affiliated. A flag is included for coaches that are of a different nationality than their own national team.

== Group A ==
=== China ===
Head coach: (Iceland) Sigurður Ragnar Eyjólfsson

No.	Pos.	Player	Date of birth (age)	Club
1	GK	Zhao Lina	18 September 1991 (aged 26)	(Chinese Football Association) Shanghai
2	DF	Liu Shanshan	16 March 1992 (aged 26)	(Chinese Football Association) Beijing
3	DF	Xue Jiao	30 January 1993 (aged 25)	(Chinese Football Association) Dalian
4	DF	Li Danyang	8 April 1990 (aged 27)	(Chinese Football Association) Dalian
5	DF	Wu Haiyan	26 February 1993 (aged 25)	(Chinese Football Association) Shandong
6	DF	Lin Yuping	28 February 1992 (aged 26)	(Chinese Football Association) Wuhan
7	MF	Wang Shuang	23 January 1995 (aged 23)	(Chinese Football Association) Wuhan
8	MF	Ma Jun	6 March 1989 (aged 29)	(Chinese Football Association) Jiangsu
9	MF	Tang Jiali	16 March 1995 (aged 23)	(Chinese Football Association) Jiangsu
10	MF	Li Ying	7 January 1993 (aged 25)	(Chinese Football Association) Shandong
11	FW	Wang Shanshan	27 January 1990 (aged 28)	(Chinese Football Association) Dalian
12	GK	Peng Shimeng	12 May 1998 (aged 19)	(Chinese Football Association) Jiangsu
13	MF	Lyu Yueyun	13 November 1995 (aged 22)	(Chinese Football Association) Wuhan
14	MF	Xu Yanlu	16 September 1991 (aged 26)	(Chinese Football Association) Jiangsu
15	MF	Song Duan	2 August 1995 (aged 22)	(Chinese Football Association) Dalian
16	MF	Yan Jinjin	10 September 1996 (aged 21)	(Chinese Football Association) Shanghai
17	FW	Gu Yasha	28 November 1990 (aged 27)	(Chinese Football Association) Beijing
18	MF	Han Peng	20 December 1989 (aged 28)	(Chinese Football Association) Changchun
19	MF	Tan Ruyin	17 July 1994 (aged 23)	(Chinese Football Association) Guangdong
20	MF	Zhang Rui	17 January 1989 (aged 29)	(Chinese Football Association) Changchun
21	MF	Xiao Yuyi	10 January 1996 (aged 22)	(Chinese Football Association) Shanghai
22	GK	Xu Huan	6 March 1999 (aged 19)	(Chinese Football Association) Beijing
23	MF	Ren Guixin	19 December 1988 (aged 29)	(Chinese Football Association) Changchun

=== Jordan ===
Head coach: (United States) Michael Dickey

No.	Pos.	Player	Date of birth (age)	Club
1	GK	Sherin Al-Shalabe	3 June 1994 (aged 23)	(Jordan Football Association) Shabab Al-Ordon
2	DF	Haya Khalil	12 September 1994 (aged 23)	(Jordan Football Association) Amman SC
3	DF	Tala Al Barghouthy	11 April 2002 (aged 15)	(Jordan Football Association) Amman SC
4	MF	Luna Al-Masri	9 March 1994 (aged 24)	(Jordan Football Association) Shabab Al-Ordon
5	FW	Anfal Al-Sufy	14 October 1995 (aged 22)	(Jordan Football Association) Al-Esteqlal
6	FW	Razan Al-Zagha	23 March 1995 (aged 23)	(Jordan Football Association) Amman SC
7	DF	Yasmeen Khair	27 June 1987 (aged 30)	(Jordan Football Association) Shabab Al-Ordon
8	MF	Stephanie Al-Naber	12 July 1987 (aged 30)	(Jordan Football Association) Shabab Al-Ordon
9	DF	Alia Abu El Hawa	11 January 1997 (aged 21)	(United States Soccer Federation) Virginia Tech Hokies
10	MF	Sarah Abu-Sabbah	27 October 1999 (aged 18)	(German Football Association) Bayer Leverkusen
11	FW	Maysa Jbarah	20 September 1989 (aged 28)	(Jordan Football Association) Amman SC
12	GK	Salma Ghazal	19 October 1998 (aged 19)	(United States Soccer Federation) Albion Hurricanes
13	FW	Lana Feras	1 June 1998 (aged 19)	(Jordan Football Association) Amman SC
14	FW	Hannah Al-Kousheh	21 January 1997 (aged 21)	(United States Soccer Federation) PSC Iowa
15	MF	Mai Sweilem	25 September 1995 (aged 22)	(Jordan Football Association) Amman SC
16	MF	Shahnaz Jebreen	28 July 1992 (aged 25)	(Jordan Football Association) Amman SC
17	MF	Rouzbahan Fraij	7 April 2000 (aged 17)	(Jordan Football Association) Shabab Al-Ordon
18	DF	Hebah Fakhereddin	19 November 1990 (aged 27)	(Jordan Football Association) Shabab Al-Ordon
19	DF	Ayah Al-Majali	9 March 1992 (aged 26)	(Jordan Football Association) Shabab Al-Ordon
20	MF	Shorooq Shathli	6 January 1987 (aged 31)	(Jordan Football Association) Shabab Al-Ordon
21	DF	Rand Abu-Hussein	1 March 1997 (aged 21)	(Jordan Football Association) Al-Esteqlal
22	GK	Malak Shannak	1 August 1998 (aged 19)	(Jordan Football Association) Amman SC
23	MF	Tasneem Abu-Rob	14 November 2000 (aged 17)	(Jordan Football Association) Shabab Al-Ordon

=== Philippines ===
Head coach: (France) Rabah Benlarbi

No.	Pos.	Player	Date of birth (age)	Club
1	GK	Inna Palacios	8 February 1994 (aged 24)	Unattached
2	DF	Claire Lim	24 October 1996 (aged 21)	Unattached
3	DF	Alesa Dolino	26 October 1992 (aged 25)	(Philippine Football Federation) OutKast
4	MF	Krystal de Ramos	16 March 1997 (aged 21)	Unattached
5	DF	Hali Long	21 January 1995 (aged 23)	Unattached
6	DF	Morgan Brown	20 October 1995 (aged 22)	Unattached
7	FW	Camille Rodriguez	27 December 1994 (aged 23)	(Philippine Football Federation) Hiraya
8	MF	Marisa Park	25 August 1991 (aged 26)	Unattached
9	FW	Jesse Shugg	2 May 1992 (aged 25)	Unattached
10	FW	Caitlyn Kreutz	28 January 1997 (aged 21)	Unattached
11	MF	Ryley Bugay	23 January 1996 (aged 22)	(United States Soccer Federation) Marquette Golden Eagles
12	GK	Kearra Bastes-Jones	29 May 2001 (aged 16)	(United States Soccer Federation) Crescenta Valley SC
13	FW	Leah Larot	26 August 1989 (aged 28)	Unattached
14	MF	Sara Castañeda	5 December 1996 (aged 21)	Unattached
15	DF	Alexa Diaz	19 September 1993 (aged 24)	Unattached
16	GK	Stacey Cavill	20 November 1994 (aged 23)	(Football Australia) Beckenham Angels
17	DF	Calah Simarago	9 October 1996 (aged 21)	(United States Soccer Federation) UC Santa Barbara Gauchos
18	MF	Tahnai Annis (captain)	20 June 1989 (aged 28)	Unattached
19	DF	Patrice Impelido	9 October 1987 (aged 30)	(Philippine Football Federation) Hiraya
20	MF	Quinley Quezada	7 April 1997 (aged 20)	(United States Soccer Federation) UC Riverside Highlanders
21	MF	Jessica Miclat	8 October 1998 (aged 19)	(United States Soccer Federation) UC Irvine Anteaters
22	DF	Chalise Baysa	30 December 1980 (aged 37)	(United States Soccer Federation) Olympic Soccer Academy
23	MF	Sarina Bolden	30 June 1996 (aged 21)	(United States Soccer Federation) Loyola Marymount Lions

=== Thailand ===
The squad was announced on 18 March.

Head coach: Nuengrutai Srathongvian

No.	Pos.	Player	Date of birth (age)	Club
1	GK	Waraporn Boonsing	16 February 1990 (aged 28)	(Football Association of Thailand) BG–CAS
2	DF	Kanjanaporn Saenkhun	18 July 1996 (aged 21)	(Football Association of Thailand) BG–CAS
3	DF	Natthakarn Chinwong	15 March 1992 (aged 26)	(Football Association of Thailand) Chonburi
4	DF	Duangnapa Sritala	4 February 1986 (aged 32)	(Football Association of Thailand) Royal Thai Airforce
5	DF	Ainon Phancha	26 January 1992 (aged 26)	(Football Association of Thailand) Chonburi
6	MF	Pikul Khueanpet	20 September 1988 (aged 29)	(Football Association of Thailand) BG–CAS
7	MF	Silawan Intamee	22 January 1994 (aged 24)	(Football Association of Thailand) Chonburi
8	FW	Suchawadee Nildhamrong	1 April 1997 (aged 21)	(United States Soccer Federation) California Golden Bears
9	DF	Warunee Phetwiset	13 December 1990 (aged 27)	(Football Association of Thailand) Chonburi
10	DF	Sunisa Srangthaisong	6 May 1988 (aged 29)	(Football Association of Thailand) BTU
11	FW	Alisa Rukpinij	2 February 1995 (aged 23)	(Football Association of Thailand) Chonburi
12	FW	Rattikan Thongsombut	7 July 1991 (aged 26)	(Football Association of Thailand) BG–CAS
13	MF	Orathai Srimanee	12 June 1988 (aged 29)	(Football Association of Thailand) BG–CAS
14	FW	Saowalak Pengngam	30 November 1996 (aged 21)	(Football Association of Thailand) Chonburi
15	MF	Nipawan Panyosuk	15 March 1995 (aged 23)	(Football Association of Thailand) Chonburi
16	MF	Khwanrudi Saengchan	16 May 1991 (aged 26)	(Football Association of Thailand) BG–CAS
17	FW	Taneekarn Dangda	15 December 1992 (aged 25)	(Football Association of Thailand) Chonburi
18	GK	Sukanya Chor Charoenying	24 November 1987 (aged 30)	(Football Association of Thailand) Chonburi
19	DF	Pitsamai Sornsai	19 January 1989 (aged 29)	(Football Association of Thailand) Chonburi
20	MF	Wilaiporn Boothduang	25 June 1987 (aged 30)	(Football Association of Thailand) Royal Thai Airforce
21	FW	Kanjana Sungngoen	21 September 1986 (aged 31)	(Football Association of Thailand) Chonburi
22	GK	Nattaruja Muthtanawech	21 August 1996 (aged 21)	(Football Association of Thailand) BG–CAS
23	FW	Kanyanat Chetthabutr	24 September 1999 (aged 18)	(Football Association of Thailand) Chonburi

== Group B ==
=== Australia ===
The squad was announced on 19 March.

Head coach: Alen Stajcic

No.	Pos.	Player	Date of birth (age)	Caps	Goals	Club
1	GK	Lydia Williams	13 May 1988 (aged 29)	65	0	(United States Soccer Federation) Seattle Reign
2	DF	Caitlin Cooper	12 February 1988 (aged 30)	9	2	(Football Australia) Sydney
3	MF	Aivi Luik	18 March 1985 (aged 33)	16	0	(Football Australia) Melbourne City
4	DF	Clare Polkinghorne (co-captain)	1 February 1989 (aged 29)	101	8	(Football Australia) Brisbane Roar
5	DF	Laura Alleway	28 November 1989 (aged 28)	52	2	(Football Australia) Melbourne Victory
6	MF	Chloe Logarzo	22 December 1994 (aged 23)	24	3	(Football Australia) Sydney
7	DF	Steph Catley	26 January 1994 (aged 24)	63	2	(United States Soccer Federation) Seattle Reign
8	DF	Elise Kellond-Knight	10 August 1990 (aged 27)	90	1	Unattached
9	MF	Alex Chidiac	15 January 1999 (aged 19)	7	0	(Football Australia) Adelaide United
10	MF	Emily van Egmond	12 July 1993 (aged 24)	69	14	(United States Soccer Federation) Orlando Pride
11	FW	Lisa De Vanna (co-captain)	14 November 1984 (aged 33)	132	43	(Football Australia) Sydney
12	GK	Casey Dumont	25 January 1992 (aged 26)	3	0	(Football Australia) Melbourne Victory
13	MF	Tameka Butt	16 June 1991 (aged 26)	64	9	(Norwegian Football Federation) Klepp
14	DF	Alanna Kennedy	21 January 1995 (aged 23)	63	3	(United States Soccer Federation) Orlando Pride
15	FW	Emily Gielnik	13 May 1992 (aged 25)	15	4	(Football Australia) Brisbane Roar
16	FW	Hayley Raso	5 September 1994 (aged 23)	22	1	(United States Soccer Federation) Portland Thorns
17	FW	Kyah Simon	25 June 1991 (aged 26)	78	22	(United States Soccer Federation) Houston Dash
18	GK	Mackenzie Arnold	25 February 1994 (aged 24)	17	0	(Norwegian Football Federation) Arna-Bjørnar
19	MF	Katrina Gorry	13 August 1992 (aged 25)	63	14	(United States Soccer Federation) Utah Royals
20	FW	Sam Kerr	10 September 1993 (aged 24)	61	21	(United States Soccer Federation) Chicago Red Stars
21	DF	Ellie Carpenter	28 April 2000 (aged 17)	16	1	(United States Soccer Federation) Portland Thorns
22	FW	Larissa Crummer	10 January 1996 (aged 22)	19	3	(Football Australia) Melbourne City
23	FW	Michelle Heyman	4 July 1988 (aged 29)	59	20	(Football Australia) Canberra United

=== Japan ===
The squad was announced on 19 March. On 2 April, Yu Nakasato withdrew due to injury and was replaced by Moeno Sakaguchi.

Head coach: Asako Takakura

No.	Pos.	Player	Date of birth (age)	Caps	Goals	Club
1	GK	Sakiko Ikeda	8 September 1992 (aged 25)	10	0	(Japan Football Association) Urawa Red Diamonds
2	DF	Rumi Utsugi	5 December 1988 (aged 29)	106	6	(United States Soccer Federation) Seattle Reign
3	DF	Aya Sameshima	16 June 1987 (aged 30)	88	4	(Japan Football Association) INAC Kobe Leonessa
4	DF	Saki Kumagai (captain)	17 October 1990 (aged 27)	93	0	(French Football Federation) Lyon
5	DF	Nana Ichise	4 August 1997 (aged 20)	9	0	(Japan Football Association) Vegalta Sendai
6	DF	Saori Ariyoshi	1 November 1987 (aged 30)	52	1	(Japan Football Association) NTV Beleza
7	MF	Emi Nakajima	27 September 1990 (aged 27)	50	10	(Japan Football Association) INAC Kobe Leonessa
8	FW	Mana Iwabuchi	18 March 1993 (aged 25)	47	13	(Japan Football Association) INAC Kobe Leonessa
9	FW	Nahomi Kawasumi	23 September 1985 (aged 32)	82	20	(United States Soccer Federation) Seattle Reign
10	MF	Mizuho Sakaguchi	15 October 1987 (aged 30)	119	28	(Japan Football Association) NTV Beleza
11	FW	Mina Tanaka	28 April 1994 (aged 23)	24	6	(Japan Football Association) NTV Beleza
12	MF	Hikaru Naomoto	3 March 1994 (aged 24)	16	0	(Japan Football Association) Urawa Red Diamonds
13	FW	Yuika Sugasawa	5 October 1990 (aged 27)	45	12	(Japan Football Association) Urawa Red Diamonds
14	MF	Yui Hasegawa	29 January 1997 (aged 21)	17	3	(Japan Football Association) NTV Beleza
15	MF	Moeno Sakaguchi	4 June 1992 (aged 25)	0	0	(Japan Football Association) Albirex Niigata
16	MF	Rin Sumida	12 January 1996 (aged 22)	10	0	(Japan Football Association) NTV Beleza
17	DF	Hikari Takagi	21 May 1993 (aged 24)	16	0	(Japan Football Association) Nojima Stella Kanagawa
18	GK	Ayaka Yamashita	29 September 1995 (aged 22)	13	0	(Japan Football Association) NTV Beleza
19	MF	Rika Masuya	14 September 1995 (aged 22)	18	3	(Japan Football Association) INAC Kobe Leonessa
20	FW	Kumi Yokoyama	10 September 1996 (aged 21)	27	11	(German Football Association) FFC Frankfurt
21	GK	Chika Hirao	31 December 1996 (aged 21)	0	0	(Japan Football Association) Albirex Niigata
22	DF	Risa Shimizu	15 June 1996 (aged 21)	4	0	(Japan Football Association) NTV Beleza
23	DF	Shiori Miyake	13 October 1995 (aged 22)	8	0	(Japan Football Association) INAC Kobe Leonessa

=== South Korea ===
The squad was announced on 9 March.

Head coach: Yoon Deok-yeo

No.	Pos.	Player	Date of birth (age)	Caps	Goals	Club
1	GK	Yoon Young-guel	28 October 1987 (aged 30)	5	0	(Korea Football Association) Gyeongju KHNP
2	DF	Park Cho-rong	20 February 1988 (aged 30)	4	0	(Korea Football Association) Hwacheon KSPO
3	DF	Kim Hye-yeong	26 February 1995 (aged 23)	9	1	(Korea Football Association) Gyeongju KHNP
4	DF	Kim Do-yeon	7 December 1988 (aged 29)	77	1	(Korea Football Association) Incheon Hyundai Steel
5	DF	Hong Hye-ji	25 August 1996 (aged 21)	10	1	(Korea Football Association) Changnyeong
6	DF	Lim Seon-joo	27 November 1990 (aged 27)	65	3	(Korea Football Association) Incheon Hyundai Steel
7	MF	Lee Min-a	8 November 1991 (aged 26)	41	8	(Japan Football Association) INAC Kobe Leonessa
8	MF	Cho So-hyun	24 June 1988 (aged 29)	108	17	(Norwegian Football Federation) Avaldsnes IL
9	FW	Jeon Ga-eul	14 September 1988 (aged 29)	87	35	(Korea Football Association) Hwacheon KSPO
10	FW	Ji So-yun	21 February 1991 (aged 27)	99	45	(The Football Association) Chelsea
11	FW	Jung Seol-bin	6 January 1990 (aged 28)	68	20	(Korea Football Association) Incheon Hyundai Steel
12	DF	Jang Sel-gi	31 May 1994 (aged 23)	38	8	(Korea Football Association) Incheon Hyundai Steel
13	MF	Lee Young-ju	22 April 1992 (aged 25)	22	2	(Korea Football Association) Incheon Hyundai Steel
14	FW	Choe Yu-ri	16 September 1994 (aged 23)	21	4	(Korea Football Association) Gumi Sportstoto
15	MF	Lee So-dam	12 October 1994 (aged 23)	43	4	(Korea Football Association) Incheon Hyundai Steel
16	FW	Han Chae-rin	2 September 1996 (aged 21)	8	3	(Korea Football Association) Incheon Hyundai Steel
17	FW	Lee Geum-min	7 April 1994 (aged 23)	33	11	(Korea Football Association) Gyeongju KHNP
18	GK	Kang Ga-ae	10 December 1990 (aged 27)	9	0	(Korea Football Association) Gumi Sportstoto
19	FW	Son Hwa-yeon	15 March 1997 (aged 21)	6	2	(Korea Football Association) Changnyeong
20	DF	Kim Hye-ri	25 June 1990 (aged 27)	69	1	(Korea Football Association) Incheon Hyundai Steel
21	GK	Jung Bo-ram	22 July 1991 (aged 26)	2	0	(Korea Football Association) Hwacheon KSPO
22	MF	Jang Chang	21 June 1996 (aged 21)	6	0	(Korea Football Association) Korea University
23	MF	Choi Ye-seul	24 December 1998 (aged 19)	1	0	(Japan Football Association) INAC Kobe Leonessa

=== Vietnam ===
The squad was announced on 22 March.

Head coach: Mai Đức Chung

No.	Pos.	Player	Date of birth (age)	Club
1	GK	Đặng Thị Kiều Trinh	19 December 1985 (aged 32)	(Vietnam Football Federation) Hồ Chí Minh City
2	DF	Nguyễn Thị Xuyến	6 September 1997 (aged 20)	(Vietnam Football Federation) Hà Nội
3	DF	Chương Thị Kiều	19 August 1995 (aged 22)	(Vietnam Football Federation) Hồ Chí Minh City
4	DF	Vũ Thị Thúy	8 August 1994 (aged 23)	(Vietnam Football Federation) Hà Nam
5	DF	Bùi Thị Như	16 June 1990 (aged 27)	(Vietnam Football Federation) Hà Nam
6	DF	Bùi Thúy An	5 October 1990 (aged 27)	(Vietnam Football Federation) Hà Nội
7	MF	Nguyễn Thị Tuyết Dung	13 December 1993 (aged 24)	(Vietnam Football Federation) Hà Nam
8	MF	Nguyễn Thị Liễu	18 September 1992 (aged 25)	(Vietnam Football Federation) Hà Nam
9	MF	Trần Thị Thùy Trang	8 August 1988 (aged 29)	(Vietnam Football Federation) Hồ Chí Minh City
10	MF	Thái Thị Thảo	12 February 1995 (aged 23)	(Vietnam Football Federation) Hà Nội
11	FW	Nguyễn Thị Thúy Hằng	19 November 1997 (aged 20)	(Vietnam Football Federation) Than Khoáng Sản
12	FW	Phạm Hải Yến	9 November 1994 (aged 23)	(Vietnam Football Federation) Hà Nội
13	FW	Nguyễn Thị Muôn	7 October 1988 (aged 29)	(Vietnam Football Federation) Hà Nội
14	GK	Trần Thị Kim Thanh	18 September 1993 (aged 24)	(Vietnam Football Federation) Hồ Chí Minh City
15	DF	Phạm Thị Tươi	26 June 1993 (aged 24)	(Vietnam Football Federation) Hà Nam
16	MF	Nguyễn Thị Bích Thùy	1 May 1994 (aged 23)	(Vietnam Football Federation) Hồ Chí Minh City
17	DF	Trần Thị Hồng Nhung	28 October 1992 (aged 25)	(Vietnam Football Federation) Hà Nam
18	MF	Nguyễn Thị Vạn	10 January 1997 (aged 21)	(Vietnam Football Federation) Than Khoáng Sản
19	FW	Huỳnh Như	28 November 1991 (aged 26)	(Vietnam Football Federation) Hồ Chí Minh City
20	MF	Trương Thị Phụng	11 March 1994 (aged 24)	(Vietnam Football Federation) Hồ Chí Minh City
21	MF	Trần Thị Phương Thảo	15 January 1993 (aged 25)	(Vietnam Football Federation) Hồ Chí Minh City
22	GK	Khổng Thị Hằng	10 October 1993 (aged 24)	(Vietnam Football Federation) Than Khoáng Sản
23	MF	Phạm Hoàng Quỳnh	20 September 1992 (aged 25)	(Vietnam Football Federation) Than Khoáng Sản

== Player representation ==
Statistics are per the beginning of the competition.

=== By club ===
Clubs with 4 or more players represented are listed.

Players	Club
12	(Thailand) Chonburi
9	(Jordan) Shabab Al-Ordon
8	(Jordan) Amman SC, (South Korea) Incheon Hyundai Steel, (Vietnam) Hồ Chí Minh City
7	(Japan) INAC Kobe Leonessa, (Japan) NTV Beleza, (Thailand) BG–CAS
6	(Vietnam) Hà Nam
5	(Vietnam) Hà Nội
4	(China) Dalian, (China) Jiangsu, (United States) Seattle Reign, (Vietnam) Than Khoáng Sản

=== By club nationality ===
Players	Clubs
23	China, Vietnam
22	Thailand, United States
21	Japan
19	Jordan, South Korea
12	Australia
3	Norway, Philippines
2	Germany
1	England, France

=== By club federation ===
Players	Federation
142	AFC
22	CONCACAF
7	UEFA

=== By representatives of domestic league ===
National squad	Players
China	23
Vietnam	23
Thailand	22
Japan	19
Jordan	19
South Korea	19
Australia	11
Philippines	3
