= List of Jordan women's international footballers =

This is a list of Jordan women's international footballers who have played for the Jordan women's national football team.

== Players ==
This list includes all players who have made at least one appearance for the national team.

Key
**Bold**	Played for the national team in the past year

Jordan women's national football team players
Player	Caps	Goals	Debut		Last or most recent match		Refs.
Player	Caps	Goals	Date	Opponent	Date	Opponent	Refs.
**Ayah Al-Majali**	155	9	3 November 2006	Malaysia	2 December 2025	Palestine	
**Maysa Jbarah**	151	144	18 September 2005	Bahrain	19 July 2025	Iran	
Shahnaz Jebreen	133	43	14 August 2007	Iran	15 November 2022	Turkey	
Stephanie Al-Naber	128	79	18 September 2005	Bahrain	9 April 2019	Vietnam	
Shorooq Shathli	109	1	18 September 2005	Bahrain	9 April 2019	Vietnam	
Yasmeen Khair	97	5	18 September 2005	Bahrain	12 April 2018	China	
**Mai Sweilem**	80	17	30 December 2010	Tunisia	2 December 2025	Palestine	
Luna Al-Masri	75	16	1 May 2009	Bahrain	25 September 2021	Iran	
**Rouzbahan Fraij**	69	4	9 February 2017	Algeria	19 July 2025	Iran	
**Tasneem Abu-Rob**	67	1	3 April 2013	Palestine	19 July 2025	Iran	
Enshirah Al-Hyasat	67	5	20 February 2010	Bahrain	25 September 2021	Iran	
**Lana Feras**	62	5	9 February 2017	Algeria	2 December 2025	Palestine	
Anfal Al-Sufy	60	9	3 April 2013	Palestine	11 April 2023	Iran	
Sama'a Khraisat	58	17	18 September 2005	Bahrain	15 March 2015	Uzbekistan	
**Rand Abu-Hussein**	57	0	24 November 2017	Japan	2 December 2025	Palestine	
Ala'a Abu Kasheh	55	2	18 September 2005	Bahrain	22 September 2014	China	
**Nour Zoqash**	55	0	9 February 2017	Algeria	19 July 2025	Iran	
**Shireen Al-Shalabi**	54	0	3 April 2013	Palestine	19 July 2025	Iran	
**Enas Al-Jamaeen**	50	4	7 April 2021	Lithuania	2 December 2025	Palestine	
Haya Khalil	47	1	3 April 2013	Palestine	23 February 2024	Lebanon	
**Bana Al-Bitar**	46	8	7 April 2021	Lithuania	2 December 2025	Palestine	
Abeer Al-Nahar	43	26	29 April 2009	Maldives	13 January 2019	Palestine	
Wa'ed Al-Rawashdeh	42	0	18 September 2005	Bahrain	15 September 2013	Vietnam	
Farah Al-Azab	41	18	18 September 2005	Bahrain	5 September 2013	Laos	
**Al-Anoud Al-Zabrey**	41	0	9 December 2017	Thailand	19 July 2025	Iran	
**Leen Al-Btoush**	38	2	16 June 2017	Algeria	28 November 2025	Lebanon	
Mis'da Al-Ramounieh	37	0	12 August 2007	Iran	5 September 2013	Laos	
Zina Al-Sadi	36	0	8 March 2011	Bahrain	14 September 2015	Myanmar	
Tasnim Isleem	29	0	27 February 2019	Northern Ireland	11 April 2023	Uzbekistan	
Hebah Fakhereddin	29	0	1 May 2009	Palestine	24 March 2018	Chinese Taipei	
Zaina Petro	28	2	25 April 2009	Kyrgyzstan	7 June 2013	Kuwait	
**Zaina Hazem**	26	0	3 March 2019	France B	19 July 2025	Iran	
Farah Al-Badarneh	25	1	12 August 2007	Iran	10 October 2011	Iran	
Ala'a Al-Qarini	23	0	18 September 2005	Bahrain	28 December 2010	Tunisia	
Sarah Abu-Sabbah	21	4	26 September 2017	Latvia	29 February 2024	Nepal	
Razan Al-Zagha	20	0	7 June 2013	Kuwait	23 February 2024	Lebanon	
**Malak Shannak**	20	0	16 June 2017	Algeria	20 February 2025	India	
Natasha Al-Naber	18	5	26 October 2019	Palestine	9 April 2019	Vietnam	
Lina Al-Saheb	18	0	10 June 2021	Tunisia	1 December 2024	Iran	
Salma Ghazal	17	0	27 July 2017	Croatia	10 April 2021	Armenia	
Mira Zakaria	15	2	18 September 2005	Bahrain	16 November 2010	South Korea	
**Yasmine Al-Ajrab**	15	0	15 November 2022	Turkey	24 November 2025	Palestine	
**Farah Abu Tayeh**	14	3	23 October 2024	Haiti	2 December 2025	Palestine	
**Rawned Kassap**	14	0	8 April 2022	India	2 December 2025	Palestine	
Hannah Al-Kousheh	12	2	7 April 2017	Iraq	12 April 2018	China	
**Roukayah Al Fararjeh**	12	2	23 October 2022	Haiti	2 December 2025	Palestine	
**Celine Akroush**	12	3	23 October 2022	Haiti	2 December 2025	Palestine	
**Taqi Al-Zabrey**	12	0	28 June 2022	Romania	2 December 2025	Palestine	
Ayah Aqleh	10	0	25 April 2009	Kyrgyzstan	28 February 2010	United Arab Emirates	
Jana Abu Ghosh	10	1	16 June 2017	Algeria	6 April 2019	Uzbekistan	
Ruba Adawi	10	0	3 November 2006	Malaysia	12 July 2009	Myanmar	
Raya Hina	10	7	8 November 2018	Maldives	3 April 2019	Hong Kong	
Qamar Saadeddin	9	0	18 September 2005	Bahrain	7 December 2006	Thailand	
Sawsan Al-Hasaseen	9	0	18 September 2005	Bahrain	7 December 2006	Thailand	
Nisreen Al-Khazaleh	8	0	23 September 2005	Palestine	7 December 2006	Thailand	
Tala Al-Barghouthy	8	1	12 December 2017	Thailand	21 February 2024	Guam	
Aida Al-Sufy	8	0	1 April 2013	Palestine	19 June 2017	Algeria	
Manar Fraij	7	3	3 November 2006	Malaysia	26 October 2009	Palestine	
**Tahreer Al-Qawasmeh**	7	0	4 September 2022	Palestine	2 December 2025	Palestine	
Tareiza Al-Oudat	6	0	1 April 2013	Palestine	15 September 2014	Chinese Taipei	
Noor Al Mashayek	5	0	4 September 2022	Palestine	27 February 2024	Palestine	
Lara Dihmis	5	2	5 June 2011	Uzbekistan	3 April 2013	Palestine	
Sharlot Abyad	4	0	12 March 2011	Palestine	7 October 2011	Iraq	
Luna Al-Momani	4	1	7 April 2017	Iraq	9 December 2017	Thailand	
Suha Al-Zogheir	4	0	3 November 2006	Malaysia	7 December 2006	Thailand	
**Ida Al-Tamimi**	4	1	24 November 2025	Palestine	2 December 2025	Palestine	
**Marah Abu Tayeh**	4	1	28 November 2024	Iran	2 December 2025	Palestine	
**Alia Hasan**	3	0	4 September 2022	Palestine	13 July 2025	Singapore	
Shatha As-Sahwneh	3	2	3 September 2013	Laos	17 April 2014	Qatar	
Maysam Abu Khashabeh	3	0	9 June 2013	Uzbekistan	31 August 2014	Egypt	
Abeer Al-Rantisi	3	0	1 April 2013	Palestine	7 June 2013	Kuwait	
Alia Abu El Hawa	3	0	6 April 2018	Philippines	12 April 2018	China	
**Jinan Al-Said**	3	0	24 November 2025	Palestine	2 December 2025	Palestine	
**Yasmeen Al-Zurikat**	2	0	3 June 2025	Bangladesh	16 July 2025	Bhutan	
Aziza Al-Hayek	2	0	14 May 2014	Vietnam	13 March 2015	Palestine	
Dina Al-Henawi	2	0	27 February 2019	Northern Ireland	5 March 2019	Turkmenistan	
Hana'a Abu Al-Rous	2	2	19 February 2005	Bahrain	25 September 2005	Bahrain	
Saja Madi	2	0	26 October 2009	Palestine	10 June 2011	Thailand	
Lama Al-Qudah	2	0	7 June 2011	Vietnam	10 June 2011	Thailand	
Jeeda Al-Naber	2	0	27 July 2017	Croatia	31 July 2017	Bosnia and Herzegovina	
Rand Al-Bustanji	2	0	10 April 2017	Tajikistan	31 July 2017	Bosnia and Herzegovina	
Sara Butai	2	0	29 April 2009	Maldives	26 October 2009	Palestine	
Lujain Al-Btoush	2	0	12 April 2021	Lebanon	22 March 2023	India	
Massa Ziyad	1	0	5 March 2019	Turkmenistan	5 March 2019	Turkmenistan	
Raneem Al-Daoud	1	0	4 September 2022	Palestine	4 September 2022	Palestine	
Zeina Matar	1	0	17 April 2014	Qatar	17 April 2014	Qatar	
Jana Al-Issawi	1	0	12 April 2021	Lebanon	12 April 2021	Lebanon	
Rania Jamhour	1	0	29 October 2024	Chinese Taipei	29 October 2024	Chinese Taipei	
Manal Manasra	1	0	26 October 2009	Palestine	26 October 2009	Palestine	
Yasmeen Shabsough	1	0	24 August 2015	Morocco	24 August 2015	Morocco	

== See also ==
- Jordan women's national football team
