= Football at the 2006 Asian Games – Women's team squads =

Below are the squads for the women's football tournament at the 2006 Asian Games, played in Doha, Qatar.

== Group A ==
=== China ===
Coach: Ma Liangxing

No.	Pos.	Player	Date of birth (age)	Club
1	GK	Han Wenxia	23 August 1976 (aged 30)	(Chinese Football Association) Dalian Shide
2	DF	Liu Huana	17 May 1981 (aged 25)	(Chinese Football Association) Shaanxi Yandong
3	DF	Li Jie	8 July 1979 (aged 27)	(Chinese Football Association) Beijing Zhaotai
4	MF	Weng Xinzhi	15 June 1988 (aged 18)	(Chinese Football Association) Jiangsu Huatai
5	DF	Pu Wei	20 August 1980 (aged 26)	(Chinese Football Association) Shanghai STV
6	DF	Yuan Fan	6 November 1986 (aged 20)	(Chinese Football Association) Shanghai STV
7	MF	Bi Yan	17 February 1984 (aged 22)	(Chinese Football Association) Dalian Shide
8	MF	Yue Min	23 September 1987 (aged 19)	(Chinese Football Association) Hebei Huayao
9	FW	Han Duan	15 June 1983 (aged 23)	(Chinese Football Association) Dalian Shide
10	FW	Ma Xiaoxu	5 June 1988 (aged 18)	(Chinese Football Association) Dalian Shide
12	MF	Zhang Tong	3 April 1984 (aged 22)	(Chinese Football Association) Beijing Zhaotai
13	MF	Wang Dandan	1 May 1985 (aged 21)	(Chinese Football Association) Beijing Zhaotai
14	DF	Wang Kun	20 October 1985 (aged 21)	(Chinese Football Association) Hebei Huayao
15	MF	Ren Liping	21 October 1978 (aged 28)	(Chinese Football Association) Beijing Zhaotai
16	DF	Liu Yali	9 February 1980 (aged 26)	(Chinese Football Association) Hebei Huayao
17	MF	Pan Lina	18 July 1977 (aged 29)	(Chinese Football Association) Shanghai STV
18	GK	Zhang Yanru	10 January 1987 (aged 19)	(Chinese Football Association) Jiangsu Huatai
19	MF	Qu Feifei	18 May 1982 (aged 24)	(Chinese Football Association) Bayi

=== Japan ===
Coach: Hiroshi Ohashi

No.	Pos.	Player	Date of birth (age)	Club
1	GK	Nozomi Yamago	16 February 1975 (aged 31)	(Japan Football Association) Urawa Red Diamonds
2	DF	Hiromi Isozaki	22 December 1975 (aged 30)	(Japan Football Association) Tasaki Perule
3	DF	Aya Shimokozuru	7 June 1982 (aged 24)	(Japan Football Association) Tasaki Perule
4	DF	Akiko Sudo	7 April 1984 (aged 22)	(Japan Football Association) Nippon TV Beleza
5	DF	Kyoko Yano	3 June 1984 (aged 22)	(Japan Football Association) Kanagawa University
6	MF	Tomoe Sakai	27 May 1978 (aged 28)	(Japan Football Association) Nippon TV Beleza
7	DF	Kozue Ando	9 July 1982 (aged 24)	(Japan Football Association) Urawa Red Diamonds
8	MF	Miyuki Yanagita	11 April 1981 (aged 25)	(Japan Football Association) Urawa Red Diamonds
9	FW	Eriko Arakawa	30 October 1979 (aged 27)	(Japan Football Association) Nippon TV Beleza
10	MF	Homare Sawa	6 September 1978 (aged 28)	(Japan Football Association) Nippon TV Beleza
12	GK	Miho Fukumoto	2 October 1983 (aged 23)	(Japan Football Association) Okayama Yunogo Belle
13	MF	Maiko Nakaoka	15 February 1985 (aged 21)	(Japan Football Association) Tasaki Perule
14	DF	Azusa Iwashimizu	14 October 1986 (aged 20)	(Japan Football Association) Nippon TV Beleza
16	FW	Karina Maruyama	26 March 1983 (aged 23)	(Japan Football Association) TEPCO Mareeze
18	MF	Aya Miyama	28 January 1985 (aged 21)	(Japan Football Association) Okayama Yunogo Belle
19	FW	Shinobu Ono	23 January 1984 (aged 22)	(Japan Football Association) Nippon TV Beleza
20	FW	Yuki Nagasato	15 July 1987 (aged 19)	(Japan Football Association) Nippon TV Beleza
29	MF	Mizuho Sakaguchi	15 October 1987 (aged 19)	(Japan Football Association) Tasaki Perule

=== Jordan ===
Coach: Issa Al-Turk

No.	Pos.	Player	Date of birth (age)	Club
1	GK	Qamar Saadeddin	25 May 1988 (aged 18)	(Jordan Football Association) Orthodox
2	DF	Farah Al-Badarneh	8 November 1987 (aged 19)	(Jordan Football Association) Orthodox
3	DF	Sawsan Al-Hasaseen	29 March 1988 (aged 18)	(Jordan Football Association) Shabab Al-Ordon
5	DF	Ruba Adawi	30 May 1984 (aged 22)	(Jordan Football Association) Amman
6	MF	Shahnaz Jebreen	28 July 1992 (aged 14)	(Jordan Football Association) Amman
7	MF	Yasmeen Khair	27 June 1987 (aged 19)	(Jordan Football Association) Shabab Al-Ordon
8	FW	Stephanie Al-Naber	12 July 1987 (aged 19)	(Jordan Football Association) Shabab Al-Ordon
9	MF	Abeer Al-Nahar	13 February 1991 (aged 15)	(Jordan Football Association) Amman
13	DF	Suha Al-Zogheir	16 May 1984 (aged 22)	(Jordan Football Association) Amman
14	MF	Enshirah Al-Hyasat	25 November 1991 (aged 15)	(Jordan Football Association) Amman
15	FW	Manar Fraij	29 April 1988 (aged 18)	(Jordan Football Association) Shabab Al-Ordon
16	DF	Lubna Salameh	21 April 1990 (aged 16)	(Jordan Football Association) Amman
18	MF	Nisrein Al-Mefleh	21 June 1986 (aged 20)	(Jordan Football Association) Orthodox
19	DF	Ayah Al-Majali	9 March 1990 (aged 16)	(Jordan Football Association) Shabab Al-Ordon
20	DF	Shorooq Shathli	6 January 1987 (aged 19)	(Jordan Football Association) Shabab Al-Ordon
21	DF	Abeer Rantisi	12 July 1987 (aged 19)	(Jordan Football Association) Orthodox
22	GK	Misda Ramounieh	26 May 1983 (aged 23)	(Jordan Football Association) Amman
23	DF	Ala Al-Qraini	25 October 1988 (aged 18)	(Jordan Football Association) Shabab Al-Ordon

=== Thailand ===
Coach: Chana Yodprang

No.	Pos.	Player	Date of birth (age)	Club
1	GK	Kanyawee Sudtavee	11 May 1986 (aged 20)	
2	DF	Darut Changplook	3 February 1988 (aged 18)	
3	DF	Phumphuang Ngoendi	6 January 1988 (aged 18)	
4	DF	Duangnapa Sritala	4 February 1986 (aged 20)	
5	DF	Benjawan Changauttha	21 November 1986 (aged 20)	
6	FW	Kitiya Thiangtham	30 June 1986 (aged 20)	
7	FW	Sukunya Peangthem	5 September 1988 (aged 18)	
8	MF	Junpen Seesraum	11 May 1987 (aged 19)	
9	MF	Wajee Kertsombun	2 April 1988 (aged 18)	
10	DF	Sunisa Srangthaisong	6 May 1988 (aged 18)	
11	MF	Suphonthip Wiphakonwit	20 September 1988 (aged 18)	
12	FW	Chidtawan Chawong	19 June 1989 (aged 17)	
13	FW	Pitsamai Sornsai	19 January 1989 (aged 17)	
14	DF	Anootsara Maijarern	14 February 1986 (aged 20)	
15	DF	Siriporn Mungkhala	22 January 1986 (aged 20)	
16	DF	Supaporn Gaewbaen	4 March 1985 (aged 21)	
20	GK	Waraporn Boonsing	16 February 1990 (aged 16)	

== Group B ==
=== Chinese Taipei ===
Coach: Chou Tai-ying

No.	Pos.	Player	Date of birth (age)	Club
1	GK	Huang Feng-chiu	20 September 1983 (aged 23)	(Chinese Taipei Football Association) NTNU Fei Yang
2	DF	Wang Chia-yu	24 September 1987 (aged 19)	(Chinese Taipei Football Association) Jinwen College
3	DF	Huang Yu-chen	11 May 1985 (aged 21)	(Chinese Taipei Football Association) NTNU Fei Yang
4	DF	Lee Hsueh-hua	17 January 1984 (aged 22)	(Chinese Taipei Football Association) NTCPE
5	MF	Chen Ya-huei	28 November 1986 (aged 20)	(Chinese Taipei Football Association) NTNU Fei Yang
6	DF	Yu Pei-wen	1 June 1983 (aged 23)	(Chinese Taipei Football Association) NTCPE
7	MF	Chuang Shu-mei	20 February 1986 (aged 20)	(Chinese Taipei Football Association) NTCPE
9	MF	Chiu Fu-yu	13 October 1984 (aged 22)	(Chinese Taipei Football Association) NTCPE
10	FW	Tseng Shu-o	6 September 1984 (aged 22)	(Chinese Taipei Football Association) NTNU Fei Yang
11	FW	Tsai Li-chen	14 October 1983 (aged 23)	(Chinese Taipei Football Association) Hsing Wu College
12	MF	Lu Yen-ling	12 January 1985 (aged 21)	(Chinese Taipei Football Association) NTNU Fei Yang
14	MF	Wang Hsiang-huei	28 September 1987 (aged 19)	(Chinese Taipei Football Association) NTNU Fei Yang
15	MF	Shih Li-hui	7 October 1985 (aged 21)	(Chinese Taipei Football Association) NTNU Fei Yang
16	DF	Lu Hui-mei	27 September 1984 (aged 22)	(Chinese Taipei Football Association) Jinwen College
17	MF	Hsieh I-ling	15 January 1988 (aged 18)	(Chinese Taipei Football Association) Hsing Wu College
18	GK	Chen Yi-ju	9 February 1981 (aged 25)	(Chinese Taipei Football Association) Hsing Wu College
20	DF	Lin Chiung-ying	2 November 1987 (aged 19)	(Chinese Taipei Football Association) NTNU Fei Yang
21	MF	Su Wan-ching	6 October 1986 (aged 20)	(Chinese Taipei Football Association) NTCPE

=== North Korea ===
Coach: Kim Kwang-min

No.	Pos.	Player	Date of birth (age)	Club
1	GK	Phi Un-hui	2 August 1985 (aged 21)	(DPR Korea Football Association) Amnokgang
2	DF	Jang Ok-gyong	29 January 1980 (aged 26)	(DPR Korea Football Association) Amnokgang
3	DF	Om Jong-ran	10 October 1985 (aged 21)	(DPR Korea Football Association) April 25
5	DF	Sonu Kyong-sun	28 September 1983 (aged 23)	(DPR Korea Football Association) April 25
6	DF	Song Jong-sun	11 March 1981 (aged 25)	(DPR Korea Football Association) Amnokgang
9	MF	Ri Un-suk	1 January 1986 (aged 20)	(DPR Korea Football Association) April 25
10	FW	Kim Yong-ae	7 March 1983 (aged 23)	(DPR Korea Football Association) April 25
11	MF	Ri Un-gyong	19 November 1980 (aged 26)	(DPR Korea Football Association) Wolmido
12	MF	Ho Sun-hui	5 March 1980 (aged 26)	(DPR Korea Football Association) Amnokgang
13	MF	Kim Hye-yong	25 August 1981 (aged 25)	(DPR Korea Football Association) April 25
14	MF	Kim Tan-sil	15 January 1985 (aged 21)	(DPR Korea Football Association) Amnokgang
16	DF	Kong Hye-ok	19 July 1983 (aged 23)	(DPR Korea Football Association) April 25
17	FW	Ri Kum-suk	16 August 1978 (aged 28)	(DPR Korea Football Association) April 25
19	FW	Jong Pok-sim	31 July 1985 (aged 21)	(DPR Korea Football Association) April 25
20	DF	Ri Un-hyang	15 May 1988 (aged 18)	(DPR Korea Football Association) Amnokgang
21	GK	Jon Myong-hui	7 August 1986 (aged 20)	(DPR Korea Football Association) Rimyongsu
22	MF	Kim Kyong-hwa	28 March 1986 (aged 20)	(DPR Korea Football Association) April 25
23	FW	Kil Son-hui	7 March 1986 (aged 20)	(DPR Korea Football Association) Rimyongsu

=== South Korea ===
Coach: An Jong-goan

No.	Pos.	Player	Date of birth (age)	Club
1	GK	Jun Min-kyung	16 January 1985 (aged 21)	(Korea Football Association) Daekyo Kangaroos
2	DF	Hwang Bo-ram	6 October 1987 (aged 19)	(Korea Football Association) Yeungjin College
3	DF	Yu Ji-eun	27 March 1983 (aged 23)	(Korea Football Association) Daekyo Kangaroos
4	FW	Park Hee-young	11 June 1985 (aged 21)	(Korea Football Association) Daekyo Kangaroos
5	DF	Hong Kyung-suk	14 October 1984 (aged 22)	(Korea Football Association) Seoul Metropolitan Government
6	DF	Lee Jin-hwa	10 October 1986 (aged 20)	(Japan Football Association) INAC Kobe Leonessa
7	MF	Kim Kyul-sil	13 April 1982 (aged 24)	(Korea Football Association) Hyundai Steel
8	MF	Park Eun-jung	4 November 1986 (aged 20)	(Korea Football Association) Yeoju College
9	FW	Kwon Hah-nul	7 March 1988 (aged 18)	(Korea Football Association) Wirye High School
10	FW	Kim Jin-hee	26 March 1981 (aged 25)	(Korea Football Association) Hyundai Steel
11	MF	Lee Ji-eun	16 December 1979 (aged 26)	(Korea Football Association) Hyundai Steel
12	DF	Park Myung-hwa	13 November 1981 (aged 25)	(Korea Football Association) Hyundai Steel
13	FW	Kim Ju-hee	1 March 1985 (aged 21)	(Korea Football Association) Hyundai Steel
14	MF	Jin Suk-hee	9 July 1978 (aged 28)	(Korea Football Association) Hyundai Steel
15	MF	Shin Sun-nam	30 May 1981 (aged 25)	(Korea Football Association) Hyundai Steel
16	MF	Jung Hae-in	6 January 1990 (aged 16)	(Korea Football Association) Wirye High School
17	MF	Ji So-yun	21 February 1991 (aged 15)	(Korea Football Association) Wirye High School
18	GK	Kim Jung-mi	16 October 1984 (aged 22)	(Korea Football Association) Hyundai Steel

=== Vietnam ===
Coach: Trần Ngọc Thái Tuấn

No.	Pos.	Player	Date of birth (age)	Club
1	GK	Đặng Thị Kiều Trinh	19 December 1985 (aged 20)	(Vietnam Football Federation) Thành Phố Hồ Chí Minh
2	DF	Bùi Thị Tuyết	23 October 1983 (aged 23)	(Vietnam Football Federation) Than Cửa Ông
6	MF	Nguyễn Thị Kim Tiến	21 September 1984 (aged 22)	(Vietnam Football Federation) Hà Nội
7	MF	Nguyễn Thị Lý	16 February 1982 (aged 24)	(Vietnam Football Federation) Hà Tây
8	DF	Đào Thị Miện	17 July 1981 (aged 25)	(Vietnam Football Federation) Hà Tây
9	FW	Đỗ Thị Hải Anh	18 October 1985 (aged 21)	(Vietnam Football Federation) Hà Nam
10	FW	Bùi Thị Tuyết Mai	16 November 1982 (aged 24)	(Vietnam Football Federation) Hà Nội
12	MF	Nguyễn Thị Hương	25 August 1983 (aged 23)	(Vietnam Football Federation) Hà Nam
14	MF	Đoàn Thị Kim Chi	29 April 1979 (aged 27)	(Vietnam Football Federation) Thành Phố Hồ Chí Minh
15	DF	Nguyễn Thị Ngọc Anh	23 February 1985 (aged 21)	(Vietnam Football Federation) Hà Nội
16	DF	Nguyễn Thị Khánh Thu	28 September 1985 (aged 21)	(Vietnam Football Federation) Hà Nam
18	MF	Nguyễn Thị Minh Nguyệt	16 November 1986 (aged 20)	(Vietnam Football Federation) Hà Tây
19	MF	Vũ Thị Huyền Linh	10 April 1987 (aged 19)	(Vietnam Football Federation) Hà Nội
20	FW	Lê Thị Hồng Nga	2 March 1987 (aged 19)	(Vietnam Football Federation) Thành Phố Hồ Chí Minh
21	MF	Văn Thị Thanh	27 August 1985 (aged 21)	(Vietnam Football Federation) Hà Nam
22	FW	Lê Thị Oanh	9 February 1984 (aged 22)	(Vietnam Football Federation) Hà Tây
23	MF	Trần Thị Kim Hồng	26 January 1985 (aged 21)	(Vietnam Football Federation) Thành Phố Hồ Chí Minh
24	GK	Lê Thị Tuyết Mai	15 February 1985 (aged 21)	(Vietnam Football Federation) Thành Phố Hồ Chí Minh
