= Morgan Brown =

Morgan Brown may refer to:

- Morgan Welles Brown (1800–1853), American judge
- Morgan Brown (actor) (1884–1961), American film actor
- Morgan Brown (footballer, born 1995), Filipino footballer
- Morgan Brown (footballer, born 1999), English footballer
