= 2020 AFC Women's Olympic Qualifying Tournament =

Tournament details
- Host countries: First round: Tajikistan (Group A); Thailand (Group B); Myanmar (Group C); Palestine (Group D); Second round: Myanmar (Group A); Uzbekistan (Group B); Qatar (Group C); Third round: South Korea (Group A); Australia (Group B)
- Dates: First round: 4–13 November 2018; Second round: 3–9 April 2019; Third round: 3–13 February 2020; Play-off round: 6–11 March 2020 and 8–13 April 2021
- Teams: 25 (from 1 confederation)

Tournament statistics
- Matches played: 56
- Goals scored: 255 (4.55 per match)
- Attendance: 52,896 (945 per match)
- Top scorer: (Chinese Taipei) Yu Hsiu-chin (10 goals)

The 2020 AFC Women's Olympic Qualifying Tournament was the 5th edition of the AFC Women's Olympic Qualifying Tournament, the quadrennial international football competition organised by the Asian Football Confederation (AFC) to determine which women's national teams from Asia qualify for the Olympic football tournament.

The top two teams of the tournament qualified for the 2020 Summer Olympics women's football tournament in Japan as the AFC representatives, together with Japan (which already qualified for the 2020 Summer Olympics as the host nation, and did not participate in the qualifying stage).

== Format ==
Of the 47 AFC member associations, a total of 25 AFC member national teams entered the qualifying stage. The format is as follows:

- First round: Excluding Japan, the five highest-ranked teams based on the June 2018 FIFA Women's World Rankings – which were Australia, North Korea, China PR, South Korea and Thailand – received byes to the third round. The next two highest-ranked teams – Vietnam and Uzbekistan – received byes to the second round. The remaining 18 teams were drawn into two groups of five teams and two groups of four teams, with the teams also seeded according to their FIFA Rankings. In each group, teams play each other once at a centralised venue. The group winners, runners-up and two best third placed advance to the second round.
- Second round: The twelve teams (two teams who entered this round and ten teams from the first round) are drawn into three groups of four teams. In each group, teams play each other once at a centralised venue. The group winners advanced to the third round.
- Third round: The eight teams (five teams who entered this round and the group winners from the second round) are drawn into two groups of four teams. In each group, teams play each other once at a centralised venue. The top two teams of each group advance to the play-off round.
- Play-off round: The group winners play against the runner-ups of the other third round group on a home-and-away basis. The two winners qualify for the Olympic Football Tournament.

=== Tiebreakers ===
Teams are ranked according to the following criteria (Regulations for the 2020 Olympic Football Tournaments, Article 19.2 and 19.3):

1. Points (3 points for a win, 1 point for a draw, 0 points for a loss)
2. Overall goal difference
3. Overall goals scored
4. Drawing of lots by the FIFA Organising Committee

Play-off ties are played on a home-and-away two-legged basis. If the aggregate score is tied after the second leg, the away goals rule is applied, and if still level, extra time is played. The away goals rule is again applied after extra time, and if still level, the penalty shoot-out is used to determine the winner (Regulations for the 2020 Olympic Football Tournaments, Article 19.6).

== Teams ==
The draw for the first round of the qualifiers was held on 2 August 2018 at the AFC House in Kuala Lumpur, Malaysia. All first round hosts were appointed after the draw.

Olympic hosts
**Japan** (6)

Teams entering third round
1. **Australia** (8)
2. North Korea (10)
3. South Korea (15)
4. **China** (17)
5. Thailand (28)

Teams entering second round
6. Vietnam (37)
7. Uzbekistan (41)

Teams entering first round
Pot 1	Pot 2	Pot 3	Pot 4	Pot 5 (unranked)
8. Chinese Taipei (42); 9. Myanmar (44) **(H)***; 10. Jordan (57); 11. Iran (58)	12. India (60); 13. Philippines (73); 14. Hong Kong (76); 15. Indonesia (77)	16. United Arab Emirates (88) **(W)**; 17. Palestine (96) **(H)***; 18. Singapore (101); 19. Nepal (102)	20. Tajikistan (110) **(H)***; 21. Bangladesh (112); 22. Maldives (119)	Lebanon; Macau **(N, W)**; Mongolia

Notes

- Teams in **bold** qualified for the Olympics.
- Numbers in parentheses indicate the June 2018 FIFA Women's World Rankings (otherwise unranked).
- (H): Qualification first round group hosts (* all chosen as group hosts after the draw, remaining group hosted at neutral venue)
- (N): Not a member of the International Olympic Committee, ineligible for Olympics
- (W): Withdrew after draw

Did not enter

- Afghanistan
- Bahrain
- Bhutan
- Brunei
- Cambodia
- Guam
- Iraq
- Kuwait
- Kyrgyzstan
- Laos
- Malaysia
- Northern Mariana Islands **(N)**
- Oman
- Pakistan
- Qatar
- Saudi Arabia
- Sri Lanka
- Syria
- Timor-Leste
- Turkmenistan
- Yemen

== First round ==
The first round was played between 4–13 November 2018.

Schedule
Matchday	Group A		Groups B, C, D	
Matchday	Dates	Matches	Dates	Matches
Matchday 1	4 November 2018	3 v 2, 5 v 4	8 November 2018	1 v 4, 2 v 3
Matchday 2	6 November 2018	4 v 1, 5 v 3	11 November 2018	4 v 2, 3 v 1
Matchday 3	8 November 2018	1 v 5, 2 v 4	13 November 2018	1 v 2, 3 v 4
Matchday 4	11 November 2018	2 v 5, 3 v 1	—	
Matchday 5	13 November 2018	4 v 3, 1 v 2	—	

=== Group A ===
- All matches were held in Tajikistan.
- Times listed are UTC+5.

Pos	Team	Pld	W	D	L	GF	GA	GD	Pts	Qualification
1	Chinese Taipei	4	4	0	0	33	0	+33	12	Second round
2	Philippines	4	3	0	1	17	7	+10	9	Second round
3	Tajikistan (H)	4	2	0	2	11	13	−2	6	
4	Mongolia	4	0	1	3	4	20	−16	1	
5	Singapore	4	0	1	3	2	27	−25	1	

Source: AFC
Rules for classification: Qualification tiebreakers
(H) Hosts
4 November 2018
13:00

Singapore	0–9	Philippines
	Report	Cadag 3', 5', 43'; Dolino 27'; Long 32', 59'; Navaja 52', 67'; Castañeda 57'

Hisor Central Stadium, Hisor
Attendance: 20
Referee: Fusako Kajiyama (Japan)
4 November 2018
16:00

Mongolia	1–4	Tajikistan
Orgodol 32'	Report	L. Khalimova 9'; G. Khalimova 53'; Fozilova 65' (pen.), 69'

Hisor Central Stadium, Hisor
Attendance: 50
Referee: Kate Jacewicz (Australia)

6 November 2018
13:00

Mongolia	2–2	Singapore
Bayarsaikhan 4'; Undral 38'	Report	Angeline Chua 68'; Raudhah 87'

Hisor Central Stadium, Hisor
Attendance: 50
Referee: Bùi Thị Thu Trang (Vietnam)
6 November 2018
16:00

Tajikistan	0–9	Chinese Taipei
	Report	Pao Hsin-hsuan 41', 44'; Yu Hsiu-chin 51', 55', 56'; Lee Hsiu-chin 66', 74'; Lin Hsin-hui 78', 82'

Hisor Central Stadium, Hisor
Attendance: 150
Referee: Pansa Chaisanit (Thailand)

8 November 2018
13:00

Chinese Taipei	9–0	Mongolia
Pao Hsin-hsuan 29'; Hsu Yi-yun 39'; Lee Hsiu-chin 40'; Yu Hsiu-chin 42' (pen.), 49', 52'; Chen Yen-ping 72', 86'; Lin Ya-han 90+2'	Report

Hisor Central Stadium, Hisor
Attendance: 30
Referee: Doumouh Al-Bakkar (Lebanon)
8 November 2018
16:00

Philippines	3–1	Tajikistan
Cadag 30'; Castañeda 50', 76' (pen.)	Report	G. Khalimova 24'

Hisor Central Stadium, Hisor
Attendance: 70
Referee: Fusako Kajiyama (Japan)

11 November 2018
13:00

Philippines	5–1	Mongolia
Cadag 8', 15', 85'; Rodriguez 60'; Inquig 81'	Report	Ulziibayar 45+2' (pen.)

Hisor Central Stadium, Hisor
Attendance: 30
Referee: Bùi Thị Thu Trang (Vietnam)
11 November 2018
16:00

Singapore	0–10	Chinese Taipei
	Report	Yu Hsiu-chin 18', 30', 40'; Pao Hsin-hsuan 28', 55', 68'; Lin Kai-ling 73'; Lin Hsin-hui 79'; Lin Ya-han 85'; Ho Hsuan-yi 86'

Hisor Central Stadium, Hisor
Attendance: 30
Referee: Doumouh Al-Bakkar (Lebanon)

13 November 2018
13:00

Chinese Taipei	5–0	Philippines
Lai Li-chin 41'; Lee Hsiu-chin 44', 65'; Yu Hsiu-chin 57'; Lin Hsin-hui 81'	Report

Hisor Central Stadium, Hisor
Attendance: 30
Referee: Pansa Chaisanit (Thailand)
13 November 2018
16:00

Tajikistan	6–0	Singapore
G. Khalimova 5', 12', 26', 38', 77'; Fozilova 47'	Report

Hisor Central Stadium, Hisor
Attendance: 50
Referee: Kate Jacewicz (Australia)

=== Group B ===
- All matches were held in Thailand (neutral venue host).
- Times listed are UTC+7.

Pos	Team	Pld	W	D	L	GF	GA	GD	Pts	Qualification
1	Iran	2	1	1	0	9	1	+8	4	Second round
2	Hong Kong	2	1	1	0	5	1	+4	4	Second round
3	Lebanon	2	0	0	2	0	12	−12	0	
4	United Arab Emirates	0	0	0	0	0	0	0	0	Withdrew
5	Macau	0	0	0	0	0	0	0	0	Withdrew

Source: AFC
Rules for classification: Qualification tiebreakers
8 November 2018
15:00

Iran	8–0	Lebanon
Chahkandi 9', 44'; Ghanbari 38', 54', 66'; Dabbaghi 57', 90+6'; Motevalli 90'	Report

Institute of Physical Education Stadium, Chonburi
Attendance: 30
Referee: Asaka Matsushita (Japan)

11 November 2018
15:00

Lebanon	0–4	Hong Kong
	Report	Cheung Wai Ki 52'; Wai Yuen Ting 55', 56'; Kwong Wing Yan 80'

Institute of Physical Education Stadium, Chonburi
Attendance: 104
Referee: Công Thị Dung (Vietnam)

13 November 2018
15:00

Iran	1–1	Hong Kong
Dabbaghi 47'	Report	Lee Wing Yan 16'

Institute of Physical Education Stadium, Chonburi
Attendance: 41
Referee: Edita Mirabidova (Uzbekistan)

=== Group C ===
- All matches were held in Myanmar.
- Times listed are UTC+6:30.

Pos	Team	Pld	W	D	L	GF	GA	GD	Pts	Qualification
1	Myanmar (H)	3	2	1	0	8	2	+6	7	Second round
2	India	3	1	1	1	9	4	+5	4	Second round
3	Nepal	3	0	3	0	3	3	0	3	Second round
4	Bangladesh	3	0	1	2	2	13	−11	1	

Source: AFC
Rules for classification: Qualification tiebreakers
(H) Hosts
8 November 2018
15:00

India	1–1	Nepal
Kamala 37'	Report	Thapa 11'

Thuwunna Stadium, Yangon
Attendance: 150
Referee: Lee Yi-chi (Chinese Taipei)
8 November 2018
18:00

Myanmar	5–0	Bangladesh
Win Theingi Tun 34', 44'; Khin Moe Wai 61'; Le Le Hlaing 84'; Yee Yee Oo 89'	Report

Thuwunna Stadium, Yangon
Attendance: 1,381
Referee: Mahsa Ghorbani (Iran)

11 November 2018
15:00

Bangladesh	1–7	India
Krishna 81'	Report	Kamala 16' (pen.), 53'; Bala 22', 23', 62', 75'; Sanju 73'

Thuwunna Stadium, Yangon
Attendance: 100
Referee: Mi Siyu (China)
11 November 2018
18:00

Nepal	1–1	Myanmar
Bhandari 3' (pen.)	Report	Khin Moe Wai 14'

Thuwunna Stadium, Yangon
Attendance: 1,601
Referee: Ri Hyang-ok (North Korea)

13 November 2018
15:00

Nepal	1–1	Bangladesh
Thapa 17'	Report	Akhi 90+3'

Thuwunna Stadium, Yangon
Attendance: 100
Referee: Lee Yi-chi (Chinese Taipei)
13 November 2018
18:00

Myanmar	2–1	India
Win Theingi Tun 3'; Nge Nge Htwe 83'	Report	Ratanbala 24'

Thuwunna Stadium, Yangon
Attendance: 1,698
Referee: Ri Hyang-ok (North Korea)

=== Group D ===
- All matches were held in Palestine.
- Times listed are UTC+2.

Pos	Team	Pld	W	D	L	GF	GA	GD	Pts	Qualification
1	Jordan	3	3	0	0	16	0	+16	9	Second round
2	Indonesia	3	1	1	1	4	5	−1	4	Second round
3	Palestine (H)	3	1	1	1	3	9	−6	4	Second round
4	Maldives	3	0	0	3	2	11	−9	0	

Source: AFC
Rules for classification: Qualification tiebreakers
(H) Hosts
8 November 2018
14:30

Jordan	6–0	Maldives
Al-Nahar 3'; Jebreen 13'; Al-Sufy 16', 90+2'; Al-Majali 73'; Hina 88'	Report

Faisal Al-Husseini International Stadium, Al-Ram
Attendance: 180
Referee: Thein Thein Aye (Myanmar)
8 November 2018
17:30

Indonesia	1–1	Palestine
Vivi 64'	Report	Sohgian 90+5'

Faisal Al-Husseini International Stadium, Al-Ram
Attendance: 100
Referee: Law Bik Chi (Hong Kong)

11 November 2018
14:30

Maldives	1–3	Indonesia
Zahir 73'	Report	Jasella 22'; Ade 49', 69'

Faisal Al-Husseini International Stadium, Al-Ram
Attendance: 100
Referee: Cha Min-ji (South Korea)
11 November 2018
17:30

Palestine	0–7	Jordan
	Report	S. Al-Naber 21'; Al-Sufy 26', 67', 81'; Jebreen 78'; Al-Nahar 83'; Abu-Rob 88'

Faisal Al-Husseini International Stadium, Al-Ram
Attendance: 190
Referee: Qin Liang (China)

13 November 2018
14:30

Jordan	3–0	Indonesia
Jebreen 16'; Al-Nahar 74'; Abu Ghosh 87'	Report

Faisal Al-Husseini International Stadium, Al-Ram
Attendance: 110
Referee: Thein Thein Aye (Myanmar)
13 November 2018
17:30

Palestine	2–1	Maldives
Sohgian 69' (pen.); Kanaaneh 74'	Report	Rifa 23'

Faisal Al-Husseini International Stadium, Al-Ram
Attendance: 150
Referee: Law Bik Chi (Hong Kong)

=== Ranking of third-placed teams ===
Due to groups having different number of teams after withdrawals, the results against the fourth-placed and fifth-placed teams in four-team and five-team groups were not considered for this ranking.

Pos	Grp	Team	Pld	W	D	L	GF	GA	GD	Pts	Qualification
1	C	Nepal	2	0	2	0	2	2	0	2	Second round
2	D	Palestine	2	0	1	1	1	8	−7	1	Second round
3	A	Tajikistan	2	0	0	2	1	12	−11	0	
4	B	Lebanon	2	0	0	2	0	12	−12	0	

Source: AFC
Rules for classification: 1) points; 2) goal difference; 3) goals scored; 4) disciplinary points; 5) drawing of lots.

== Second round ==
The draw for the second round of the qualifiers was held on 13 February 2019, 16:00 MYT (UTC+8), at the AFC House in Kuala Lumpur, Malaysia. For the second round, the twelve teams were drawn into three groups of four teams. The teams were seeded according to their latest FIFA Rankings. The three teams which originally indicated their intention to serve as qualification group hosts (Myanmar, Palestine and Uzbekistan) prior to the draw were drawn into separate groups.

Participation in qualification second round
Pot 1	Pot 2	Pot 3	Pot 4
1. Vietnam (35); 2. Chinese Taipei (40); 3. Myanmar (44) (H)	4. Jordan (52); 5. Iran (60); 6. India (62)	7. Philippines (74); 8. Hong Kong (77); 9. Indonesia (84)	10. Palestine (106) ~~(H)~~; 11. Nepal (108); 12. Uzbekistan (NR) (H)

Notes

- Numbers in parentheses indicate the December 2018 FIFA Women's World Rankings (NR: unranked).
- (H): Qualification second round group hosts (Palestine were chosen to serve as hosts prior to the draw, but were replaced after the draw, and group hosted at neutral venue)

The second round was played between 3–9 April 2019.

Schedule
Matchday	Dates	Matches
Matchday 1	3 April 2019	1 v 4, 2 v 3
Matchday 2	6 April 2019	4 v 2, 3 v 1
Matchday 3	9 April 2019	1 v 2, 3 v 4

=== Group A ===
- All matches were held in Myanmar.
- Times listed are UTC+6:30.

Pos	Team	Pld	W	D	L	GF	GA	GD	Pts	Qualification
1	Myanmar (H)	3	2	1	0	12	4	+8	7	Third round
2	India	3	2	1	0	8	4	+4	7	
3	Nepal	3	1	0	2	4	7	−3	3	
4	Indonesia	3	0	0	3	1	10	−9	0	

Source: AFC
Rules for classification: Qualification tiebreakers
(H) Hosts
3 April 2019
15:00

India	2–0	Indonesia
Dangmei 27', 68'	Report

Mandalarthiri Stadium, Mandalay
Attendance: 100
Referee: Kim Yu-jeong (South Korea)
3 April 2019
18:00

Myanmar	3–1	Nepal
Yee Yee Oo 24'; Win Theingi Tun 48' (pen.), 90+4'	Report	Thapa 45+2'

Mandalarthiri Stadium, Mandalay
Attendance: 1,582
Referee: Mahsa Ghorbani (Iran)

6 April 2019
15:00

Nepal	1–3	India
Thapa 7'	Report	Magar 6' (o.g.); Sandhiya 60'; Ashalata 79' (pen.)

Mandalarthiri Stadium, Mandalay
Attendance: 356
Referee: Law Bik Chi (Hong Kong)
6 April 2019
18:00

Indonesia	0–6	Myanmar
	Report	Khin Marlar Tun 2', 49'; Yee Yee Oo 19', 65', 74'; Win Theingi Tun 32'

Mandalarthiri Stadium, Mandalay
Attendance: 755
Referee: Cha Min-ji (South Korea)

9 April 2019
15:30

Myanmar	3–3	India
Win Theingi Tun 17', 23', 73'	Report	Sandhiya 10'; Sanju 32'; Ratanbala 64'

Mandalarthiri Stadium, Mandalay
Attendance: 851
Referee: Mahsa Ghorbani (Iran)
9 April 2019
15:30

Indonesia	1–2	Nepal
Baiq 47'	Report	Bhandari 36', 89'

Bahtoo Stadium, Mandalay
Attendance: 100
Referee: Cha Min-ji (South Korea)

=== Group B ===
- All matches were held in Uzbekistan.
- Times listed are UTC+5.

Pos	Team	Pld	W	D	L	GF	GA	GD	Pts	Qualification
1	Vietnam	3	3	0	0	6	2	+4	9	Third round
2	Uzbekistan (H)	3	2	0	1	8	3	+5	6	
3	Jordan	3	0	1	2	0	4	−4	1	
4	Hong Kong	3	0	1	2	2	7	−5	1	

Source: AFC
Rules for classification: Qualification tiebreakers
(H) Hosts
3 April 2019
15:00

Vietnam	2–1	Uzbekistan
Huỳnh Như 8'; Nguyễn Thị Tuyết Dung 57' (pen.)	Report	Kuchkarova 11'

Lokomotiv Stadium, Tashkent
Attendance: 306
Referee: Oh Hyeon-jeong (South Korea)
3 April 2019
15:00

Jordan	0–0	Hong Kong
	Report

Transportation Institute Stadium, Tashkent
Attendance: 50
Referee: Ranjita Devi Tekcham (India)

6 April 2019
15:00

Uzbekistan	2–0	Jordan
Kudratova 72', 90+2'	Report

Lokomotiv Stadium, Tashkent
Attendance: 220
Referee: Jon Sol-mi (North Korea)
6 April 2019
15:00

Hong Kong	1–2	Vietnam
Wai Yuen Ting 48'	Report	Sin Chung Yee 24' (o.g.); Huỳnh Như 40'

Transportation Institute Stadium, Tashkent
Attendance: 50
Referee: Doumouh Al-Bakkar (Lebanon)

9 April 2019
15:00

Vietnam	2–0	Jordan
Nguyễn Thị Vạn 65'; Huỳnh Như 67'	Report

Transportation Institute Stadium, Tashkent
Attendance: 30
Referee: Oh Hyeon-jeong (South Korea)
9 April 2019
15:00

Hong Kong	1–5	Uzbekistan
Cheung Wai Ki 58'	Report	Sarikova 31', 43', 81'; Karachik 57', 88'

Lokomotiv Stadium, Tashkent
Attendance: 145
Referee: Ranjita Devi Tekcham (India)

=== Group C ===
- All matches were held in Qatar (neutral venue host); matches were originally to be held in Palestine, but were moved as Iranian citizens were banned from entering Palestine territories by Iranian law.
- Times listed are UTC+3.

Pos	Team	Pld	W	D	L	GF	GA	GD	Pts	Qualification
1	Chinese Taipei	3	3	0	0	11	3	+8	9	Third round
2	Philippines	3	2	0	1	11	4	+7	6	
3	Iran	3	1	0	2	10	6	+4	3	
4	Palestine	3	0	0	3	0	19	−19	0	

Source: AFC
Rules for classification: Qualification tiebreakers
3 April 2019
17:00

Chinese Taipei	3–0	Palestine
Zhuo Li-ping 43'; Wang Hsiang-huei 56'; Ting Chi 68'	Report

Saoud bin Abdulrahman Stadium, Al Wakrah
Attendance: 22
Referee: Seinn Cho Aung (Myanmar)
3 April 2019
20:00

Iran	0–2	Philippines
	Report	Semacio 47'; Del Campo 52'

Grand Hamad Stadium, Doha
Attendance: 100
Referee: Công Thị Dung (Vietnam)

6 April 2019
17:00

Palestine	0–9	Iran
	Report	Chahkandi 4'; Dabbaghi 20', 22'; Hamoudi 37', 48'; Ghomi 56', 83'; Ghanbari 67', 82'

Saoud bin Abdulrahman Stadium, Al Wakrah
Attendance: 85
Referee: Asmita Manandhar (Nepal)
6 April 2019
20:00

Philippines	2–4	Chinese Taipei
Semacio 13'; Tomanon 32'	Report	Pao Hsin-hsuan 45' (pen.); Tomanon 48' (o.g.); Dolino 63' (o.g.); Ting Chi 87'

Grand Hamad Stadium, Doha
Attendance: 150
Referee: Edita Mirabidova (Uzbekistan)

9 April 2019
19:00

Chinese Taipei	4–1	Iran
Pao Hsin-hsuan 12', 47'; Chen Yen-ping 15'; Tseng Shu-o 36' (pen.)	Report	Ghanbari 62'

Grand Hamad Stadium, Doha
Attendance: 100
Referee: Edita Mirabidova (Uzbekistan)
9 April 2019
19:00

Philippines	7–0	Palestine
Semacio 17' (pen.); Del Campo 29'; Madarang 31', 60'; Impelido 62'; Castañeda 66', 70' (pen.)	Report

Saoud bin Abdulrahman Stadium, Al Wakrah
Attendance: 71
Referee: Asmita Manandhar (Nepal)

== Third round ==
The draw for the third round of the qualifiers was held on 18 October 2019, 16:00 MYT (UTC+8), at the AFC House in Kuala Lumpur, Malaysia. For the third round, the eight teams were drawn into two groups of four teams. The teams were seeded according to their latest FIFA Rankings. The two teams which originally indicated their intention to serve as qualification group hosts prior to the draw (China and South Korea) were drawn into separate groups (this was already ensured due to them being in the same pot).

Participation in qualification third round
Pot 1	Pot 2	Pot 3	Pot 4
1. Australia (8) (H)*; 2. ~~North Korea (9)~~ (W)	3. China (16) ~~(H)~~; 4. South Korea (20) (H)	5. Vietnam (34); 6. Thailand (39)	7. Chinese Taipei (40); 8. Myanmar (45)

Notes

- Numbers in parentheses indicate the September 2019 FIFA Women's World Rankings.
- (H): Qualification third round group hosts (* Australia replaced China as group hosts after the draw)
- (W): Withdrew after draw

The third round was scheduled to be played between 3–9 February 2020. However, the schedule of Group B was extended to 3–13 February 2020 due to a shift for the Group B hosts to Australia and the quarantine requirements of members of the China national team as a result of the COVID-19 pandemic.

Schedule
Matchday	Group A		Group B	
Matchday	Dates	Matches	Dates	Matches
Matchday 1	3 February 2020	3 v 1	3 February 2020	3 v 4
Matchday 2	6 February 2020	2 v 3	7 February 2020	1 v 4, 2 v 3
Matchday 3	9 February 2020	1 v 2	10 February 2020	4 v 2, 3 v 1
Matchday 4	—		13 February 2020	1 v 2

=== Group A ===
- All matches were held in South Korea.
- Times listed are UTC+9.
- North Korea were reported to have withdrawn from the competition for unknown reasons.

Pos	Team	Pld	W	D	L	GF	GA	GD	Pts	Qualification
1	South Korea (H)	2	2	0	0	10	0	+10	6	Play-off round
2	Vietnam	2	1	0	1	1	3	−2	3	Play-off round
3	Myanmar	2	0	0	2	0	8	−8	0	
4	North Korea	0	0	0	0	0	0	0	0	Withdrew

Source: AFC
Rules for classification: Qualification tiebreakers
(H) Hosts
3 February 2020
19:00

Myanmar	0–7	South Korea
	Live Report; Stats Report	Ji So-yun 6' (pen.), 52'; Lee So-dam 37'; Park Ye-eun 53', 71'; Yeo Min-ji 81', 89'

Jeju World Cup Stadium, Seogwipo
Attendance: 484
Referee: Kate Jacewicz (Australia)

6 February 2020
19:00

Vietnam	1–0	Myanmar
Ngân Thị Vạn Sự 62'	Live Report; Stats Report

Jeju World Cup Stadium, Seogwipo
Attendance: 158
Referee: Qin Liang (China)

9 February 2020
15:00

South Korea	3–0	Vietnam
Jang Sel-gi 23'; Choo Hyo-joo 53'; Ji So-yun 83'	Live Report; Stats Report

Jeju World Cup Stadium, Seogwipo
Attendance: 1,278
Referee: Edita Mirabidova (Uzbekistan)

=== Group B ===
- All matches were originally scheduled to be held in China, but were moved to Australia.
- On 22 January 2020, the AFC moved the third round qualifiers Group B from Wuhan to Nanjing, due to the COVID-19 pandemic in China which originated from Wuhan.
- On 26 January 2020, as the pandemic worsened in China, the Chinese Football Association withdrew their hosting rights, and all group matches were moved to Sydney in Australia.
- On 29 January 2020, after the announcement of the venues and kick-off times, and upon their arrival in Australia, the Chinese team and staff were subject to quarantine at a hotel in Brisbane for a term set to end on 5 February, after the first games were scheduled to be played on 3 February, as a result of the requirements of the Australian government in response to the COVID-19 pandemic in Australia. On 31 January 2020, Football Federation Australia published the amended match schedule which allowed China to play their first match after the quarantine had ended. Further changes to the schedule were announced on 2 and 5 February 2020.
- Times listed are UTC+11.

Pos	Team	Pld	W	D	L	GF	GA	GD	Pts	Qualification
1	Australia (H)	3	2	1	0	14	1	+13	7	Play-off round
2	China	3	2	1	0	12	2	+10	7	Play-off round
3	Chinese Taipei	3	1	0	2	1	12	−11	3	
4	Thailand	3	0	0	3	1	13	−12	0	

Source: AFC
Rules for classification: Qualification tiebreakers
(H) Hosts
3 February 2020
19:30

Thailand	0–1	Chinese Taipei
	Live Report; Stats Report	Ting Chi 19'

Campbelltown Stadium, Sydney
Attendance: 208
Referee: Yoshimi Yamashita (Japan)

7 February 2020
16:30

China	6–1	Thailand
Li Ying 6', 66'; Zhang Xin 11'; Wang Shanshan 41'; Tang Jiali 45', 51'	Live Report; Stats Report	Silawan 80'

Campbelltown Stadium, Sydney
Attendance: 616
Referee: Abirami Naidu (Singapore)
7 February 2020
19:30

Australia	7–0	Chinese Taipei
Foord 10', 24', 38'; Catley 31'; Raso 54'; Kerr 64'; Gorry 90+2'	Live Report; Stats Report

Campbelltown Stadium, Sydney
Attendance: 1,510
Referee: Oh Hyeon-jeong (South Korea)

10 February 2020
16:30

Chinese Taipei	0–5	China
	Live Report; Stats Report	Tang Jiali 5'; Wu Haiyan 25'; Wang Shanshan 26', 30'; Li Ying 34'

Campbelltown Stadium, Sydney
Attendance: 505
Referee: Mahsa Ghorbani (Iran)
10 February 2020
19:30

Thailand	0–6	Australia
	Live Report; Stats Report	Van Egmond 44', 45+4', 70'; Simon 67', 73'; Raso 71'

Campbelltown Stadium, Sydney
Attendance: 2,167
Referee: Yoshimi Yamashita (Japan)

13 February 2020
19:30

Australia	1–1	China
Van Egmond 90+2'	Live Report; Stats Report	Tang Jiali 86'

Bankwest Stadium, Sydney
Attendance: 5,660
Referee: Yoshimi Yamashita (Japan)

== Play-off round ==
The play-off round was scheduled for 6 March 2020 (first legs hosted by third round group winners) and 11 March 2020 (second legs hosted by third round group runners-up). However, only one of the two ties was played as scheduled.

Due to the COVID-19 pandemic in China, the home leg of China was moved to Campbelltown Stadium in Sydney, Australia instead of in China. The home leg of South Korea was originally scheduled to be played at Yongin Citizen Sports Park in Yongin, but had been cancelled due to the COVID-19 pandemic in South Korea. The Korea Football Association had urged that it must be played in South Korean territory even if the match is played behind closed doors, while the Chinese Football Association had urged that it must be switched to a neutral venue such as Australia due to the re-entry ban to Chinese nationals by the Australian Federal government. On 28 February 2020, the AFC announced both legs were rescheduled to 9 and 14 April 2020. On 9 March 2020, FIFA and AFC announced that play-off matches between South Korea and China were further postponed to 4 and 9 June 2020. On 27 May 2020, FIFA and AFC confirmed that play-off matches between South Korea and China would be postponed to 19 and 24 February 2021, as the Olympics had been postponed to July 2021. On 2 February 2021, FIFA and AFC announced that play-off matches between South Korea and China were further postponed to 8 and 13 April 2021. On 3 March 2021, FIFA and AFC confirmed the venues and time for the play-off matches between South Korea and China.

The two play-off round winners qualified for the 2020 Summer Olympics.

Team 1	Agg.	Team 2	1st leg	2nd leg
Australia	7–1	Vietnam	5–0	2–1
South Korea	3–4	China	1–2	2–2 (a.e.t.)

6 March 2020
18:30 UTC+11

Australia	5–0	Vietnam
Kerr 10', 80' (pen.); Logarzo 27'; Van Egmond 38'; Polkinghorne 67'	Live Report; Stats Report

McDonald Jones Stadium, Newcastle
Attendance: 14,014
Referee: Abirami Naidu (Singapore)
11 March 2020
18:00 UTC+7

Vietnam	1–2	Australia
Huỳnh Như 55'	Live Report; Stats Report	Kerr 15'; Raso 27'

Cẩm Phả Stadium, Cẩm Phả
Attendance: 54
Referee: Thein Thein Aye (Myanmar)

Australia won 7–1 on aggregate.

8 April 2021
16:00 UTC+9

South Korea	1–2	China
Kang Chae-rim 39'	Live Report; Stats Report	Zhang Xin 33'; Wang Shuang 73' (pen.)

Goyang Stadium, Goyang
Attendance: 1,091
Referee: Casey Reibelt (Australia)
13 April 2021
16:00 UTC+8

China	2–2 (a.e.t.)	South Korea
Yang Man 69'; Wang Shuang 104'	Live Report; Stats Report	Kang Chae-rim 31'; Li Mengwen 45' (o.g.)

Suzhou Olympic Sports Centre, Suzhou
Attendance: 13,533
Referee: Yoshimi Yamashita (Japan)

China won 4–3 on aggregate.

== Qualified teams ==
The following three teams from the AFC qualified for the 2020 Summer Olympic women's football tournament, including Japan which qualified as the hosts.

Team	Qualified on	Previous appearances in the Summer Olympics^{1}
Japan	7 September 2013	4 (1996, 2004, 2008, 2012)
Australia	11 March 2020	3 (2000^{2}, 2004^{2}, 2016)
China	13 April 2021	5 (1996, 2000, 2004, 2008, 2016)

^{1} Bold indicates champions for that year. Italic indicates hosts for that year.
^{2} Australia qualified as a member of the OFC in 2000 and 2004.

== Goalscorers ==
- First round: there were 128 goals scored in 25 matches, for an average of 5.12 goals per match.
- Second round: there were 73 goals scored in 18 matches, for an average of 4.06 goals per match.
- Third round: there were 39 goals scored in 9 matches, for an average of 4.33 goals per match.
- Play-off round: there were 15 goals scored in 4 matches, for an average of 3.75 goals per match.

In total, there were 255 goals scored in 56 matches, for an average of 4.55 goals per match.

10 goals

- (Chinese Taipei) Yu Hsiu-chin

9 goals

- (Chinese Taipei) Pao Hsin-hsuan
- (Myanmar) Win Theingi Tun

7 goals

- (Philippines) Shelah Mae Cadag
- (Tajikistan) Gulsunbi Khalimova

6 goals

- (Iran) Zahra Ghanbari

5 goals

- (Australia) Emily van Egmond
- (Chinese Taipei) Lee Hsiu-chin
- (Iran) Hajar Dabbaghi
- (Jordan) Anfal Al-Sufy
- (Myanmar) Yee Yee Oo
- (Philippines) Sara Castañeda

4 goals

- (Australia) Sam Kerr
- (China) Tang Jiali
- (Chinese Taipei) Lin Hsin-hui
- (India) Ngangom Bala Devi
- (Nepal) Niru Thapa
- (Vietnam) Huỳnh Như

3 goals

- (Australia) Caitlin Foord
- (Australia) Hayley Raso
- (China) Li Ying
- (China) Wang Shanshan
- (Chinese Taipei) Chen Yen-ping
- (Chinese Taipei) Ting Chi
- (Hong Kong) Wai Yuen Ting
- (India) Yumnam Kamala Devi
- (Iran) Samaneh Chahkandi
- (Jordan) Abeer Al-Nahar
- (Jordan) Shahnaz Jebreen
- (Nepal) Sabitra Bhandari
- (Philippines) Joyce Semacio
- (South Korea) Ji So-yun
- (Tajikistan) Madina Fozilova
- (Uzbekistan) Makhliyo Sarikova

2 goals

- (Australia) Kyah Simon
- (China) Wang Shuang
- (China) Zhang Xin
- (Chinese Taipei) Lin Ya-han
- (Hong Kong) Cheung Wai Ki
- (India) Nongmaithem Ratanbala Devi
- (India) Dangmei Grace
- (India) Sandhiya Ranganathan
- (India) Sanju Yadav
- (Indonesia) Ade Mustikiana Oktafiani
- (Iran) Sara Ghomi
- (Iran) Mona Hamoudi
- (Myanmar) Khin Marlar Tun
- (Myanmar) Khin Moe Wai
- (Palestine) Caroline Sohgian
- (Philippines) Alisha del Campo
- (Philippines) Hali Long
- (Philippines) Eva Madarang
- (Philippines) Irish Navaja
- (South Korea) Kang Chae-rim
- (South Korea) Park Ye-eun
- (South Korea) Yeo Min-ji
- (Uzbekistan) Lyudmila Karachik
- (Uzbekistan) Nilufar Kudratova

1 goal

- (Australia) Steph Catley
- (Australia) Katrina Gorry
- (Australia) Chloe Logarzo
- (Australia) Clare Polkinghorne
- (Bangladesh) Akhi Khatun
- (Bangladesh) Krishna Rani
- (China) Wu Haiyan
- (China) Yang Man
- (Chinese Taipei) Ho Hsuan-yi
- (Chinese Taipei) Hsu Yi-yun
- (Chinese Taipei) Lai Li-chin
- (Chinese Taipei) Lin Kai-ling
- (Chinese Taipei) Tseng Shu-o
- (Chinese Taipei) Wang Hsiang-huei
- (Chinese Taipei) Zhuo Li-ping
- (Hong Kong) Kwong Wing Yan
- (Hong Kong) Lee Wing Yan
- (India) Loitongbam Ashalata Devi
- (Indonesia) Baiq Amiatun
- (Indonesia) Vivi Oktavia Riski
- (Indonesia) Jasella Arifya Sari
- (Iran) Melika Motevalli
- (Jordan) Jana Abu Ghosh
- (Jordan) Tasneem Abu-Rob
- (Jordan) Ayah Al-Majali
- (Jordan) Stephanie Al-Naber
- (Jordan) Raya Hina
- (Maldives) Fadhuwa Zahir
- (Maldives) Mariyam Rifa
- (Mongolia) Namuun Bayarsaikhan
- (Mongolia) Tsasan-Okhin Orgodol
- (Mongolia) Undrakh Ulziibayar
- (Mongolia) Tuvshinjargal Undral
- (Myanmar) Le Le Hlaing
- (Myanmar) Nge Nge Htwe
- (Palestine) Saja Kanaaneh
- (Philippines) Alesa Dolino
- (Philippines) Patrice Impelido
- (Philippines) Kyla Inquig
- (Philippines) Camille Rodriguez
- (Philippines) Patricia Tomanon
- (Singapore) Raudhah Kamis
- (Singapore) Angeline Chua
- (South Korea) Choo Hyo-joo
- (South Korea) Jang Sel-gi
- (South Korea) Lee So-dam
- (Tajikistan) Laylo Khalimova
- (Thailand) Silawan Intamee
- (Uzbekistan) Ugiloy Kuchkarova
- (Vietnam) Ngân Thị Vạn Sự
- (Vietnam) Nguyễn Thị Tuyết Dung
- (Vietnam) Nguyễn Thị Vạn

1 own goal

- (China) Li Mengwen (against South Korea)
- (Hong Kong) Sin Chung Yee (against Vietnam)
- (Nepal) Punam Magar (against India)
- (Philippines) Alesa Dolino (against Chinese Taipei)
- (Philippines) Patricia Tomanon (against Chinese Taipei)
