= Yang Man =

Chinese footballer

Yang Man (Chinese: 杨曼, born 2 November 1995) is a Chinese footballer who participated in the 2016 Summer Olympics.

== International goals ==
No.	Date	Venue	Opponent	Score	Result	Competition
1.	5 June 2016	Changzhou Olympic Sports Centre, Changzhou, China	Thailand	3–0	3–0	Friendly
2.	3 December 2018	Guam Football Association National Training Center, Dededo, Guam	Hong Kong	3–0	6–0	2019 EAFF E-1 Football Championship
3.	13 April 2021	Suzhou Olympic Sports Centre, Suzhou, China	South Korea	1–2	2–2 (a.e.t.)	2020 AFC Women's Olympic Qualifying Tournament
