= Raudhah Kamis =

Singaporean footballer

Personal information
- Date of birth: 4 March 1999 (age 27)
- Place of birth: Singapore
- Position: Forward

Senior career*
Years	Team	Apps	(Gls)
- Tiong Bahru FC

International career
- Singapore
- * Club domestic league appearances and goals

Raudhah Kamis is a Singaporean footballer who plays as a forward for Hougang FC and the Singapore women's national team.

== International career ==
In 2017, Raudhah played for Singapore in the inaugural Women's Development Triangular tournament held in Singapore. In the first match against Bangladesh, she scored two goals and Singapore won the match 3–0.

Raudhah was called up by the national team for the 2022 FAS Tri-Nations Series.

== International goals ==
No.	Date	Venue	Opponent	Score	Result	Competition
1	16 February 2017	Jalan Besar Stadium, Jalan Besar, Singapore	Bangladesh	1–0	3–0	2017 Women's Development Triangular
2	16 February 2017	Jalan Besar Stadium, Jalan Besar, Singapore	Bangladesh	2–0	3–0	2017 Women's Development Triangular
3	6 November 2018	Hisor Central Stadium, Hisor, Tajikistan	Mongolia	2–2	2–2	2020 AFC Women's Olympic Qualifying Tournament
4.	23 November 2018	Jalan Besar Stadium, Jalan Besar, Singapore	Maldives	1–0	1–0	2018 Women's Development Triangular
