= Lin Hsin-hui =

Taiwanese footballer

Personal information
- Date of birth: 6 February 2002 (age 24)
- Place of birth: Taoyuan City, Taiwan
- Position: Forward

Team information
- Current team: Taipei Bravo
- Number: 14

Senior career*
Years	Team	Apps	(Gls)
	Taipei Bravo	0	(0)

International career^{‡}
2016	Chinese Taipei U14	5	(7)
2017	Chinese Taipei U16	5	(1)
2019	Chinese Taipei U19	3	(1)
2019–	Chinese Taipei	8	(4)
- * Club domestic league appearances and goals ‡ National team caps and goals as of 10 February 2020

Lin Hsin-hui (Chinese: 林欣卉; born 6 February 2002) is a Taiwanese footballer who plays as a forward for Taiwan Mulan Football League club Taipei Bravo and the Chinese Taipei women's national team.

== International goals ==
No.	Date	Venue	Opponent	Score	Result	Competition
1.	6 November 2018	Hisor Central Stadium, Hisor, Tajikistan	Tajikistan	8–0	9–0	2020 AFC Women's Olympic Qualifying Tournament
2.	6 November 2018	Hisor Central Stadium, Hisor, Tajikistan	Tajikistan	9–0	9–0	2020 AFC Women's Olympic Qualifying Tournament
3.	11 November 2018	Hisor Central Stadium, Hisor, Tajikistan	Singapore	8–0	10–0	2020 AFC Women's Olympic Qualifying Tournament
4.	13 November 2018	Hisor Central Stadium, Hisor, Tajikistan	Philippines	5–0	5–0	2020 AFC Women's Olympic Qualifying Tournament
5.	30 November 2023	Suoka Sports Training Base Pitch 1, Zhuhai, China	Macau	4–0	16–0	2024 EAFF E-1 Football Championship
6.	30 November 2023	Suoka Sports Training Base Pitch 1, Zhuhai, China	Macau	8–0	16–0	2024 EAFF E-1 Football Championship
7.	4 December 2023	Suoka Sports Training Base Pitch 1, Zhuhai, China	Guam	1–0	3–0	2024 EAFF E-1 Football Championship
