= Yousef Al-Naber =

Jordanian footballer

Personal information
- Full name: Yousef Mazen Al-Naber
- Date of birth: 8 August 1989 (age 37)
- Height: 1.71 m (5 ft 7 in)
- Position: Left winger

Team information
- Current team: Head Coach at Al Inglizia FC

Youth career
- 2004–2006: Shabab Al-Ordon

Senior career*
Years	Team	Apps	(Gls)
2006–2012	Shabab Al-Ordon		
2012–2014	Al-Faisaly		
2014	Shabab Al-Ordon		
2014–2015	Al-Ramtha		
2015	Al-Faisaly		
2015–2016	Shabab Al-Ordon		
2016–2017	Al-Faisaly		
2017–2020	Shabab Al-Ordon		
2020–2021	Al-Salt		
2022–2023	Shabab Al-Ordon		

International career^{‡}
2007–2008	Jordan U19		
2010–2011	Jordan U23		(1)
2016–2018	Jordan	4	(1)
- * Club domestic league appearances and goals ‡ National team caps and goals as of 15 November 2016

Yousef Mazen Al-Naber (Arabic: يوسف مازن النبر; born 8 August 1989) is a retired Jordanian footballer who currently coaches Inglizia FC.

== Personal life ==
Yousef is a Christian and has two sisters Stephanie and Natasha.

== Career statistics ==
=== International ===
As of 15 November 2016

Jordan national team
Year	Apps	Goals
2016	2	1
2017	1	0
2018	1	0
Total	4	1

U-23
#	Date	Venue	Opponent	Score	Result	Competition
1	February 15, 2011	Zarqa	Yemen	3-0	Win	U-23 Friendly

Senior
#	Date	Venue	Opponent	Score	Result	Competition
1	March 24, 2016	Amman	Bangladesh	8-0	Win	2018 FIFA World Cup qualification
