= Leah Larot =

Filipino footballer

Personal information
- Full name: Leah Janessa Hernandez Larot
- Date of birth: 26 August 1989 (age 37)
- Place of birth: San Jose, California, United States
- Position: Forward

College career
Years	Team	Apps	(Gls)
2007–2010	Sacramento State	78	(17)

Senior career*
Years	Team	Apps	(Gls)
2018	Fresno FC		

International career
2018–	Philippines	3	
- * Club domestic league appearances and goals

Leah Janessa Hernandez Larot (born 26 August 1989) is a footballer who played as a forward. Born in the United States, she represented the Philippines at international level. She was part of the team that competed in the 2018 AFC Women's Asian Cup.

== College career ==
Leah Larot played for the Sacramento State Hornets, the women's soccer team of her college, California State University, Sacramento. Entering her senior year, Larot has played 62 games for the Hornets, starting as a forward for 29 of those games. In her senior year, she was named as the Sacramento State Hornets' Best Female Athlete due to her role in helping her team win the Big Sky Conference for the second time in four years. She was also named as part of the First Team all-Big Sky Conference for that season.

== Club career ==
In 2018, Larot played for the now-defunct Fresno FC in the Women's Premier Soccer League's Coastal Conference.

== International career ==
Larot has played for the Philippine national team and is eligible to represent the country through her Filipino father. She was part of the squad that participated at the 2018 AFC Women's Asian Cup in Jordan.

She also has a younger sister, Raylene who has also played for Sacramento State and has received a call up to the Philippine national team.
