= Zar Chi Oo =

Burmese footballer

Personal information
- Date of birth: 6 May 1988 (age 38)
- Place of birth: Taungoo, Myanmar
- Position: Defender

International career^{‡}
Years	Team	Apps	(Gls)
2015	Myanmar	1+	(0+)
- ‡ National team caps and goals as of 10 May 2015.

Zar Chi Oo (born 6 May 1988) is a Burmese footballer who plays as a defender for the Myanmar women's national team.

== International career ==
Zar Chi Oo capped for Myanmar at senior level during the 2015 AFF Women's Championship.
