= Natasha Al-Naber =

Jordanian footballer

Personal information
- Full name: Natasha Mazen Yousef Al-Naber
- Date of birth: 15 March 1995 (age 31)
- Place of birth: Amman, Jordan
- Position: Midfielder

Team information
- Current team: Shabab Al-Ordon
- Number: 9

Senior career*
Years	Team	Apps	(Gls)
- Shabab Al-Ordon

International career^{‡}
	Jordan U14		(0)
	Jordan U16		(3)
2009–	Jordan	18	(5)
- * Club domestic league appearances and goals ‡ National team caps and goals as of 9 April 2019

Natasha Mazen Yousef Al-Naber (born 15 March 1995), known as Natasha Al-Naber (Arabic: نتاشا النبر), is a Jordanian footballer who plays as a midfielder for local Women's League club Shabab Al-Ordon and the Jordan women's national team. She is the sister of Stephanie Al-Naber and Yousef Al-Naber.
