= Misda Ramounieh =

Jordanian footballer

Mis'da Ramounieh مسعدة رمونية (Arabic)
Personal information
- Full name: Mis'da Mustafa Mohammad Ramounieh
- Date of birth: 25 May 1983 (age 43)
- Place of birth: United States
- Position: Goalkeeper

Senior career*
Years	Team	Apps	(Gls)
- Orthodox Club

International career^{‡}
2009	Jordan	6	(0)
- * Club domestic league appearances and goals ‡ National team caps and goals as of 12 July 2009

Mis'da Mustafa Mohammad Ramounieh (Arabic: مسعده مصطفى محمد رمونية, born 25 May 1983) is a Jordanian footballer who plays as a goalkeeper. She has captained both Jordanian side Orthodox Club and the Jordan women's national team.

== International career ==
Ramounieh was barred from competing at the 2012 AFC Women's Olympic Qualifying Tournament as she wears hijab.

== See also ==
- List of Jordan women's international footballers
