= Kearra Bastes-Jones =

Filipino footballer (born 2001)

Personal information
- Full name: Kearra Theryes Bastes Jones
- Date of birth: 29 May 2001 (age 25)
- Place of birth: Duarte, California, United States
- Height: 1.73 m (5 ft 8 in)
- Position: Goalkeeper

Youth career
- 2016–2019: Bishop Amat H.S.
- –: Crescenta Valley

College career
Years	Team	Apps	(Gls)
2019–	UC Santa Barbara		

International career^{‡}
2018–	Philippines	4	(0)
- ‡ National team caps and goals as of 16 April 2018

Kearra Theryes Bastes Jones (born 29 May 2001), known as Kearra Bastes-Jones, is a professional footballer who plays as a goalkeeper. Born in the United States, she represents the Philippines at international level.

Bastes-Jones attended Bishop Amat High School in La Puente, California and is part of her school's women's soccer team which competed in the Del Rey League of the CIF Southern Section. She was captain from 2017 to 2018. She was named into the San Gabriel Valley Tribune, Pasadena Star-News, Whittier Daily News Girls Soccer All-Area First Team.

In the club level, prior to entering college, she has played for Crescenta Valley SC.

Bastes-Jones is part of the Philippines women's national football team that participated at the 2018 AFC Women's Asian Cup She started in the Philippines' first match against host Jordan. The match ended in a 2–1 win.

Her mother, Hariett Bastes, traces her roots to Davao. Starting September 2019 she will play college soccer at UC Santa Barbara.
