= Tasneem Abu-Rob =

Jordanian footballer

Personal information
- Full name: Tasneem Yasin Abdel-Rahman Abu-Rob
- Date of birth: 14 November 2000 (age 25)
- Place of birth: Amman, Jordan
- Height: 1.70 m (5 ft 7 in)
- Position: Midfielder

Team information
- Current team: Shabab Al-Ordon
- Number: 11

Youth career
- Orthodox Club

Senior career*
Years	Team	Apps	(Gls)
- Shabab Al-Ordon

International career^{‡}
	Jordan U14		(6)
	Jordan U16		(2)
2016	Jordan U17	3	(0)
	Jordan U19		(1)
2013–	Jordan	64	(1)
- * Club domestic league appearances and goals ‡ National team caps and goals as of 20 February 2025

Tasneem Yasin Abdel-Rahman Abu-Rob (born 14 November 2000), known as Tasneem Abu-Rob (Arabic: تسنيم ابو الرب), is a Jordanian footballer who plays as a midfielder for local Women's League club Shabab Al-Ordon and the Jordan women's national team.

== International goals ==
Scores and results list Jordan's goal tally first.

No.	Date	Venue	Opponent	Score	Result	Competition
1.	11 November 2018	Faisal Al-Husseini International Stadium, Al-Ram, Palestine	Palestine	7–0	7–0	2020 AFC Women's Olympic Qualifying Tournament
