= Shabab Al-Ordon Club (women) =

Shabab Al-Ordon
- Full name: Shabab Al-Ordon Club
- Founded: 2003; 23 years ago
- President: Salim Khair
- Manager: Aziz El Khayati
- League: Jordan Women's Football League
Home colours	Away colours

Shabab Al-Ordon Club (Women) is a Jordanian professional women's football club from Amman representing Shabab Al-Ordon Club in the Jordan Women's Football League. The team was founded in 2003, and won the inaugural WAFF Women's Clubs Championship in 2019 with five wins in as many matches.

== Results ==
Season	Division	P	W	D	L	GF	GA	Pts	Pos
2005–06	Women's Premier League	5	5	0	0	70	0	15	1st
2006–07	Women's Premier League	unknown							1st
2007–08	Women's Premier League	unknown							1st
2008–09	Women's Premier League	12	11	0	1	127	1	33	1st
2009–10	Women's Premier League	unknown							1st
2010–11	Women's Premier League	9	7	0	2	125	7	21	2nd
2011–12	Women's Premier League	12	8	1	3	94	14	25	1st
2012–13	Women's Premier League	not held							
2013–14	Women's Premier League	unknown							1st
2014–15	Women's Premier League	unknown							2nd
2015–16	Women's Premier League	8	7	1	0	39	4	22	1st
2016–17	Women's Premier League	8	6	1	1	47	10	19	2nd

== Current squad ==
Note: Flags indicate national team as defined under FIFA eligibility rules; some limited exceptions apply. Players may hold more than one non-FIFA nationality.

No.	Pos.	Nation	Player
1	GK	JOR	Sherin Al-Shalabe
3	DF	JOR	Nour Zoqash
7	MF	JOR	Yasmeen Khair
8	FW	JOR	Stephanie Al-Naber
9	FW	JOR	Natasha Al-Naber
11	MF	JOR	Tasneem Abu-Rob
15	DF	JOR	Rand Abu-Hussein
17	MF	JOR	Rouzbahan Fraij
18	MF	JOR	Hebah Fakher Elddin
20	MF	JOR	Shorooq Shathli
77	FW	JOR	Raya Hina
—	GK	JOR	Ayat Habib
—	GK	JOR	Zaina Al-Sa'adi
—	DF	JOR	Alaa Al-Dabbas
—	DF	JOR	Haya Nofal
—	DF	JOR	Israa Ajarmeh
—	DF	JOR	Jaydah Al-Naber
—	DF	JOR	Noor Ayoub

No.	Pos.	Nation	Player
—	DF	JOR	Noof Hijazi
—	DF	JOR	Sara Al-Amer
—	DF	JOR	Sawsan Al-Hasasin
—	DF	JOR	Wa'ed Al-Rawashdeh
—	MF	JOR	Aseel Al-Barawi
—	MF	JOR	Baraa Al-Rashdan
—	MF	JOR	Dina Aqel
—	MF	JOR	Emma Couric
—	MF	JOR	Larissa Al-Dapouki
—	MF	JOR	Rand Khrisat
—	MF	JOR	Razan Al-Shamali
—	MF	JOR	Sama Khrisat
—	MF	JOR	Mira Issa
—	MF	JOR	Shatha Sahawneh
—	FW	JOR	Manar Fraij
—	FW	JOR	Luna Al-Momani
—	FW	JOR	Dina Al-Fayez
—	FW	JOR	Fatina Abu Al-Wafa
