= Abeer Rantisi =

Jordanian footballer

Personal information
- Date of birth: 12 July 1987 (age 39)
- Position: Defender

Senior career*
Years	Team	Apps	(Gls)
- Orthodox

International career
- Jordan
- * Club domestic league appearances and goals

Abeer Rantisi (born 12 July 1987) is a Jordanian former footballer who played as a midfielder for the Jordan women's national football team and was one of its original members. She competed with the team at the 2006 Asian Games. At the club level, she played for Orthodox in Jordan.

In 2014, Rantisi served as coach for the Asian Football Development Project, a non-profit that supports a number of football programs for refugees in the northern part of Jordan.

As of September 2015, Rantisi was the head of women's football for the Jordan Football Association.
