= Aida Al-Sufy =

Jordanian footballer

Aida Al-Sufy عايدة الصوفي (Arabic)
Personal information
- Full name: Aida Nayef Hammad Al-Sufy
- Date of birth: 20 May 1994 (age 32)
- Place of birth: Amman, Jordan
- Position: Forward

International career^{‡}
Years	Team	Apps	(Gls)
2012	Jordan U19	1+	(2)
2013–2015	Jordan	8	(0)
- ‡ National team caps and goals as of 20 September 2015.

Aida Nayef Hammad Al-Sufy (Arabic: عايدة نايف حماد الصوفي; born 20 May 1994) is a Jordanian footballer who plays as a forward. She has been a member of the Jordan women's national team.

== International career ==
Al-Sufy capped for Jordan at senior level during the 2014 AFC Women's Asian Cup qualification and the 2016 AFC Women's Olympic Qualifying Tournament.

== Personal life ==
Al-Sufy is Muslim.
