= Tareiza Al-Oudat =

Jordanian footballer

Personal information
- Full name: Tareiza Hakam Hani Al-Oudat
- Date of birth: 3 December 1992 (age 33)
- Place of birth: Amman, Jordan
- Position: Forward

Senior career*
Years	Team	Apps	(Gls)
- Amman

International career
2008–2010	Jordan U19	7	(0)
2013	Jordan	1	(0)
- * Club domestic league appearances and goals

Tareiza Hakam Hani Al-Oudat (Arabic: طريزة حكم هاني العودات; born 3 December 1992) is a Jordanian footballer who plays as a forward. She has been a member of the Jordan women's national team.

== Club career ==
Al-Oudat has played for Amman in Jordan.

== International career ==
Al-Oudat capped for Jordan at senior level during the 2014 AFC Women's Asian Cup qualification.

== Personal life ==
Al-Oudat is Christian.
