= Salma Ghazal =

American-born Jordanian footballer

Personal information
- Full name: Salma Mohanad Yousef Ghazal
- Date of birth: 19 October 1998 (age 28)
- Place of birth: Sugar Land, Texas
- Height: 1.78 m (5 ft 10 in)
- Position: Goalkeeper

Team information
- Current team: Houston Cougars
- Number: 1

College career
Years	Team	Apps	(Gls)
2018–2019	Texas Southern Tigers	18	(0)
2020–2021	Houston Cougars	9	(0)

Senior career*
Years	Team	Apps	(Gls)
2019	Texas Titans		

International career^{‡}
2018–	Jordan	4	(0)
- * Club domestic league appearances and goals as of 8 September 2019 ‡ National team caps and goals as of 9 April 2019

Salma Mohanad Yousef Ghazal (born 19 October 1998) is a footballer who plays as a goalkeeper for the Houston Cougars. Born in the United States, he plays for the Jordan women's national team. Ghazal began her collegiate soccer career at Texas Southern University, where she ranked second nationally in NCAA saves per game and earned Goalkeeper of the Week honors in the Southwestern Athletic Conference. She later transferred to the University of Houston, where she became a standout player, earning a place on the American Athletic Conference Honor Roll and recording a shutout in her debut season

== Early life ==
Ghazal was raised in Sugar Land, Texas.
