= Rand Abu-Hussein =

Jordanian footballer (born 1997)

Personal information
- Full name: Rand Iyad Jawdat Abu-Hussein
- Date of birth: 1 March 1997 (age 29)
- Place of birth: Amman, Jordan
- Position: Defender

Team information
- Current team: Shabab Al-Ordon
- Number: 15

Senior career*
Years	Team	Apps	(Gls)
- Shabab Al-Ordon

International career^{‡}
2017–	Jordan	50	(0)
- * Club domestic league appearances and goals ‡ National team caps and goals as of 8 April 2025

Rand Iyad Jawdat Abu-Hussein (born 1 March 1997), known as Rand Abu-Hussein (Arabic: رند ابو حسين), is a Jordanian footballer who plays as a defender for local Women's League club Shabab Al-Ordon and the Jordan women's national team.
