= Hebah Fakhereddin =

Jordanian footballer

Personal information
- Full name: Hebah Moh'd Helal Taher Fakher Elddin
- Date of birth: 19 November 1990 (age 35)
- Place of birth: Amman, Jordan
- Position: Defender

Team information
- Current team: Shabab Al-Ordon
- Number: 18

Senior career*
Years	Team	Apps	(Gls)
- Shabab Al-Ordon

International career^{‡}
- Jordan U19
2009–2018	Jordan	29	(0)
- * Club domestic league appearances and goals ‡ National team caps and goals as of 12 April 2018

Hebah Moh'd Helal Taher Fakher Elddin (born 19 November 1990), known as Hebah Fakher Elddin (Arabic: هبة فخر الدين), is a Jordanian footballer who plays as a defender for local Women's League club Shabab Al-Ordon. She has been a member of the Jordan women's national team.
