= Sherin Al-Shalabe =

Jordanian footballer

Personal information
- Full name: Sherin Rai'd Kheiraldeen Al-Shalabe
- Date of birth: 3 June 1994 (age 32)
- Place of birth: Amman, Jordan
- Position: Goalkeeper

Team information
- Current team: Shabab Al-Ordon
- Number: 1

Senior career*
Years	Team	Apps	(Gls)
- Shabab Al-Ordon

International career^{‡}
2017–	Jordan	48	(0)
- * Club domestic league appearances and goals ‡ National team caps and goals as of 8 April 2025

Sherin Rai'd Kheiraldeen Al-Shalabe (born 3 June 1994) is a Jordanian footballer who plays as a goalkeeper for local Women's League club Shabab Al-Ordon and the Jordan women's national team.
