= Stephanie Al-Naber =

Jordanian footballer (born 1988)

Personal information
- Full name: Stephanie Mazen Yousef Al-Naber
- Date of birth: 27 October 1988 (age 38)
- Place of birth: Amman, Jordan
- Height: 1.62 m (5 ft 4 in)
- Position: Midfielder

Team information
- Current team: Shabab Al-Ordon
- Number: 8

Youth career
- 1999-2004: Orthodox
- 2004: Shabab Al-Ordon

Senior career*
| Years | Team | Apps | (Gls) |
| 2004– | Shabab Al-Ordon | | |
| 2009–2010 | → Fortuna Hjørring (loan) | | |
| 2014 | → Sadaka (loan) | | |

International career^{‡}
| 2005–2019 | Jordan | 128 | (79) |
- * Club domestic league appearances and goals ‡ National team caps and goals as of 20 April 2021

Stephanie Mazen Yousef Al-Naber (Arabic: ستيفاني مازن يوسف النبر; born 27 October 1988) is a Jordanian footballer who plays as a midfielder for Jordan Women's Football League club Shabab Al-Ordon.

== Club career ==
Al-Naber learned to play football in the street with her family. She later played on her school's team and began her career with Shabab Al-Ordon, one of the first Jordanian clubs in the country to start a women's team.

Al-Naber later became the first Jordanian woman to play football in leagues abroad. She played for clubs in Denmark, the United Arab Emirates, and Lebanon.

== International career ==
Al-Naber has been a main-stay of the Jordan women's national team since its inception in 2005.

She helped the national team win the West Asian Football Federation Women's Championship in 2005, 2007, and 2014 as well as the 2010 Arabia Women's Cup. Al-Naber was part of the Jordan national squads that played in the 2006, 2010, and 2014 Asian Games.

She was also part of the squad that participated in the 2014 AFC Women's Asian Cup qualifiers helping Jordan qualify for the continental tournament for the first time.

== Personal life ==
As of January 2017, Al-Naber's father is a director at Shabab Al-Ordon. Both her siblings, Yousef and Natasha, are footballers.

== International goals ==
| No. | Date | Venue | Opponent | Score | Result | Competition |
|---|---|---|---|---|---|---|
| 1. | 25 April 2009 | KLFA Stadium, Kuala Lumpur, Malaysia | Kyrgyzstan | 2–0 | 7–1 | 2010 AFC Women's Asian Cup qualification |
| 2. | 25 April 2009 | KLFA Stadium, Kuala Lumpur, Malaysia | Kyrgyzstan | 6–0 | 7–1 | 2010 AFC Women's Asian Cup qualification |
| 3. | 29 April 2009 | KLFA Stadium, Kuala Lumpur, Malaysia | Maldives | 5–0 | 9–0 | 2010 AFC Women's Asian Cup qualification |
| 4. | 29 April 2009 | KLFA Stadium, Kuala Lumpur, Malaysia | Maldives | 6–0 | 9–0 | 2010 AFC Women's Asian Cup qualification |
| 5. | 29 April 2009 | KLFA Stadium, Kuala Lumpur, Malaysia | Maldives | 8–0 | 9–0 | 2010 AFC Women's Asian Cup qualification |
| 6. | 29 April 2009 | KLFA Stadium, Kuala Lumpur, Malaysia | Maldives | 9–0 | 9–0 | 2010 AFC Women's Asian Cup qualification |
| 7. | 1 May 2009 | KLFA Stadium, Kuala Lumpur, Malaysia | Palestine | 1–0 | 5–0 | 2010 AFC Women's Asian Cup qualification |
| 8. | 1 May 2009 | KLFA Stadium, Kuala Lumpur, Malaysia | Palestine | 5–0 | 5–0 | 2010 AFC Women's Asian Cup qualification |
| 9. | 3 May 2009 | KLFA Stadium, Kuala Lumpur, Malaysia | Uzbekistan | 1–1 | 2–2 | 2010 AFC Women's Asian Cup qualification |
| 10. | 12 March 2011 | Prince Mohammed Stadium, Zarqa, Jordan | Palestine | 2–0 | 6–0 | 2012 Summer Olympics qualification |
| 11. | 3 October 2011 | Zayed Sports City Stadium, Abu Dhabi, UAE | Palestine | 1–1 | 8–1 | 2011 WAFF Women's Championship |
| 12. | 7 October 2011 | Zayed Sports City Stadium, Abu Dhabi, UAE | Iraq | 1–0 | 4–0 | 2011 WAFF Women's Championship |
| 13. | 5 June 2013 | Amman International Stadium, Amman, Jordan | Lebanon | 2–0 | 5–0 | 2014 AFC Women's Asian Cup qualification |
| 14. | 5 June 2013 | Amman International Stadium, Amman, Jordan | Lebanon | 3–0 | 5–0 | 2014 AFC Women's Asian Cup qualification |
| 15. | 7 June 2013 | Amman International Stadium, Amman, Jordan | Kuwait | 3–0 | 21–0 | 2014 AFC Women's Asian Cup qualification |
| 16. | 7 June 2013 | Amman International Stadium, Amman, Jordan | Kuwait | 9–0 | 21–0 | 2014 AFC Women's Asian Cup qualification |
| 17. | 7 June 2013 | Amman International Stadium, Amman, Jordan | Kuwait | 10–0 | 21–0 | 2014 AFC Women's Asian Cup qualification |
| 18. | 7 June 2013 | Amman International Stadium, Amman, Jordan | Kuwait | 17–0 | 21–0 | 2014 AFC Women's Asian Cup qualification |
| 19. | 9 June 2013 | Amman International Stadium, Amman, Jordan | Uzbekistan | 3–0 | 4–0 | 2014 AFC Women's Asian Cup qualification |
| 20. | 9 September 2013 | Thuwunna Stadium, Yangon, Myanmar | Malaysia | 1–0 | 1–0 | 2013 AFF Women's Championship |
| 21. | 15 April 2014 | Petra Stadium, Amman, Jordan | Bahrain | 2–0 | 3–0 | 2014 WAFF Women's Championship |
| 22. | 15 April 2014 | Petra Stadium, Amman, Jordan | Bahrain | 3–0 | 3–0 | 2014 WAFF Women's Championship |
| 23. | 19 April 2014 | Petra Stadium, Amman, Jordan | Palestine | 9–0 | 10–0 | 2014 WAFF Women's Championship |
| 24. | 16 May 2014 | Thống Nhất Stadium, Hồ Chí Minh City, Vietnam | Australia | 1–3 | 1–3 | 2014 AFC Women's Asian Cup |
| 25. | 15 September 2014 | Incheon Namdong Asiad Rugby Field, Incheon, South Korea | Chinese Taipei | 1–2 | 2–2 | 2014 Asian Games |
| 26. | 13 March 2015 | Petra Stadium, Amman, Jordan | Palestine | 3–0 | 6–0 | 2016 AFC Women's Olympic Qualifying Tournament |
| 27. | 13 March 2015 | Petra Stadium, Amman, Jordan | Palestine | 5–0 | 6–0 | 2016 AFC Women's Olympic Qualifying Tournament |
| 28. | 15 March 2015 | Petra Stadium, Amman, Jordan | Uzbekistan | 1–0 | 2–0 | 2016 AFC Women's Olympic Qualifying Tournament |
| 29. | 3 April 2017 | Pamir Stadium, Dushanbe, Tajikistan | Bahrain | 5–0 | 6–0 | 2018 AFC Women's Asian Cup qualification |
| 30. | 5 April 2017 | Pamir Stadium, Dushanbe, Tajikistan | United Arab Emirates | 3–0 | 6–0 | 2018 AFC Women's Asian Cup qualification |
| 31. | 5 April 2017 | Pamir Stadium, Dushanbe, Tajikistan | United Arab Emirates | 5–0 | 6–0 | 2018 AFC Women's Asian Cup qualification |
| 32. | 7 April 2017 | Pamir Stadium, Dushanbe, Tajikistan | Iraq | 3–0 | 10–0 | 2018 AFC Women's Asian Cup qualification |
| 33. | 7 April 2017 | Pamir Stadium, Dushanbe, Tajikistan | Iraq | 5–0 | 10–0 | 2018 AFC Women's Asian Cup qualification |
| 34. | 7 April 2017 | Pamir Stadium, Dushanbe, Tajikistan | Iraq | 9–0 | 10–0 | 2018 AFC Women's Asian Cup qualification |
| 35. | 10 April 2017 | Pamir Stadium, Dushanbe, Tajikistan | Tajikistan | 1–0 | 10–2 | 2018 AFC Women's Asian Cup qualification |
| 36. | 10 April 2017 | Pamir Stadium, Dushanbe, Tajikistan | Tajikistan | 8–1 | 10–2 | 2018 AFC Women's Asian Cup qualification |
| 37. | 12 April 2017 | Pamir Stadium, Dushanbe, Tajikistan | Philippines | 5–0 | 5–1 | 2018 AFC Women's Asian Cup qualification |
| 38. | 11 November 2018 | Faisal Al-Husseini International Stadium, Al-Ram, Palestine | Palestine | 1–0 | 7–0 | 2020 AFC Women's Olympic Qualifying Tournament |
| 39. | 15 January 2019 | Al-Muharraq Stadium, Muharraq, Bahrain | Bahrain | 1–0 | 1–0 | 2019 WAFF Women's Championship |
