= Shorooq Shathli =

Jordanian footballer (born 1987)

Personal information
- Full name: Shorooq Khalil Moh'd Shathli
- Date of birth: 6 January 1987 (age 39)
- Place of birth: Amman, Jordan
- Position: Midfielder

Team information
- Current team: Shabab Al-Ordon
- Number: 20

Senior career*
Years	Team	Apps	(Gls)
- Shabab Al-Ordon

International career^{‡}
2005–2019	Jordan	109	(1)
- * Club domestic league appearances and goals ‡ National team caps and goals as of 9 April 2019

Shorooq Khalil Moh'd Shathli (born 6 January 1987), known as Shorooq Shathli (Arabic: شروق الشاذلي), is a Jordanian footballer who plays as a midfielder for local Women's League club Shabab Al-Ordon.
