= 2026 AFC U-20 Women's Asian Cup qualification =

Tournament details
- Host countries: Bhutan (Group A); Vietnam (Group B); Tajikistan (Group C); Myanmar (Group D); China (Group E); Malaysia (Group F); Uzbekistan (Group G); Laos (Group H)
- Dates: 6–10 August 2025
- Teams: 33 (from 1 confederation)
- Venues: 8 (in 8 host cities)

Tournament statistics
- Matches played: 48
- Goals scored: 249 (5.19 per match)
- Top scorer(s): (North Korea) Ho Kyong (8 goals)

The 2026 AFC U-20 Women's Asian Cup qualification was a women's under-20 football competition that determined the participating teams in the 2026 AFC U-20 Women's Asian Cup final tournament.

A total of 12 teams qualified to play in the final tournament, with the host country qualifying automatically. The qualifying round was held between 6 and 10 August 2025.

== Draw ==
The draw was held on 28 April 2025, 15:00 MYT at the AFC House in Kuala Lumpur, Malaysia.

Of the 47 AFC member associations, a total of 33 teams entered the competition. Unlike the previous edition, there was no automatic qualification for the final tournament by their position from the last tournament; all teams excluding the host participated in qualification. The 33 teams were divided into eight groups, seven groups of four teams and one group of five. The teams were seeded based on a points system derived from their final rankings across the previous three editions of the Finals.

Thailand automatically qualified for the final tournament as hosts.

Teams entering qualifying round
	Pot 1	Pot 2	Pot 3	Pot 4	Pot 5 (unranked)
Host pot	**China** **(H)**; **Vietnam** **(H)**; **Uzbekistan** **(H)**; Myanmar **(H)**		Malaysia **(H)**; Bhutan **(H)**; Laos **(H)**	Tajikistan **(H)**	
Remaining teams	**North Korea**; **Japan**; **Australia**; **South Korea**	**Chinese Taipei**; Iran; Lebanon; Nepal; **India**; **Jordan**; Kyrgyzstan; **Bangladesh**	Hong Kong; Cambodia; Palestine; Northern Mariana Islands; Indonesia	Guam; Turkmenistan; Mongolia **(W)**; Singapore	Bahrain; Saudi Arabia; Syria; Timor-Leste

Notes

- Teams in **bold** qualified for the final tournament.

Did not enter

- Afghanistan
- Brunei
- Iraq
- Kuwait
- Macau
- Maldives
- Oman
- Pakistan
- Philippines
- Qatar
- Sri Lanka
- United Arab Emirates
- Yemen

== Format ==
=== Tiebreakers ===
Teams were ranked according to points (3 points for a win, 1 point for a draw, 0 points for a loss), and if tied on points, the following tiebreaking criteria were applied, in the order given, to determine the rankings (Regulations Article 7.2):

1. Points in head-to-head matches among tied teams;
2. Goal difference in head-to-head matches among tied teams;
3. Goals scored in head-to-head matches among tied teams;
4. If two or more teams are tied, and after applying all head-to-head criteria above, a subset of teams are still tied, all head-to-head criteria above are reapplied exclusively to this subset of teams;
5. Goal difference in all group matches;
6. Goals scored in all group matches;
7. Penalty shoot-out if only two teams are tied and they meet in the last round of the group;
8. Disciplinary points (yellow card = 1 point, red card as a result of two yellow cards = 3 points, direct red card = 3 points, yellow card followed by direct red card = 4 points);
9. Drawing of lots.

== Groups ==
=== Group A ===
- All matches were held in Bhutan.
- Times listed are UTC+6.

Pos	Team	Pld	W	D	L	GF	GA	GD	Pts	Qualification
1	North Korea	3	3	0	0	36	0	+36	9	Final tournament
2	Nepal	3	1	1	1	2	12	−10	4	
3	Saudi Arabia	3	1	0	2	2	17	−15	3	
4	Bhutan (H)	3	0	1	2	2	13	−11	1	
5	Mongolia	0	0	0	0	0	0	0	0	Withdrew

Source: AFC
Rules for classification: Qualification tiebreakers
(H) Hosts
6 August 2025
14:00

North Korea	15–0	Saudi Arabia
Choe Rim-jong 2'; Pak Ok-i 6', 23', 81'; Kang Ryu-mi 17', 42', 48'; Ri Su-jong 29', 31'; Ro Un-hyang 40', 45+1'; Ri Ye-gyong 54'; So Ryu-gyong 51'; Choe Chong-gum 58', 68'	Report

Changlimithang Stadium, Thimphu
Referee: Azusa Sugino (Japan)
6 August 2025
18:00

Nepal	1–1	Bhutan
Senu Pariyar 1'	Report	Keld. Wangmo 18'

Changlimithang Stadium, Thimphu
Referee: Lê Thị Ly (Vietnam)

8 August 2025
14:00

Saudi Arabia	0–1	Nepal
	Report	Sukriya Miya 89'

Changlimithang Stadium, Thimphu
Referee: Azusa Sugino (Japan)
8 August 2025
18:00

Bhutan	0–10	North Korea
	Report	Choe Yon-a 3'; Ro Un-hyang 11'; Pak Ok-i 21'; Kang Ryu-mi 31'; Ho Kyong 34', 61', 66'; Jon II-chong 49', 58'; So Ryu-gyong 55'

Changlimithang Stadium, Thimphu
Referee: Yang Shu-ting (Chinese Taipei)

10 August 2025
14:00

North Korea	11–0	Nepal
Ho Kyong 2', 12', 24', 37', 41'; Pak Ok-i 50'; Choe Chong-gum 53', 90+1', 90+5'; Jong Pok-yong 88'; Pak Son-gyong 90+7'	Report

Changlimithang Stadium, Thimphu
Referee: Yang Shu-ting (Chinese Taipei)
10 August 2025
18:00

Bhutan	1–2	Saudi Arabia
Lhamo 29'	Report	Abualsamh 52'; Al-Shnaifi 61'

Changlimithang Stadium, Thimphu
Referee: Supiree Testhomya (Thailand)

=== Group B ===
- All matches were held in Vietnam.
- Times listed are UTC+7.

Pos	Team	Pld	W	D	L	GF	GA	GD	Pts	Qualification
1	Vietnam (H)	3	3	0	0	14	0	+14	9	Final tournament
2	Hong Kong	3	2	0	1	5	8	−3	6	
3	Kyrgyzstan	3	1	0	2	2	5	−3	3	
4	Singapore	3	0	0	3	1	9	−8	0	

Source: AFC
Rules for classification: Qualification tiebreakers
(H) Hosts
6 August 2025
16:00

Kyrgyzstan	1–2	Hong Kong
Gaparova 68'	Report	Wei Lan 52'; Leung Hong Kiu 90'

Vietnam Youth Football Training Center, Hanoi
Referee: Ranjita Devi Teckham (India)
6 August 2025
19:00

Vietnam	5–0	Singapore
Nguyễn Vĩnh Thục Nghi 15'; Y Za Lương 48'; Nguyễn Ngô Thảo Nguyên 50'; Nguyễn Thị Thương 86'; Cà Thị Phượng 88'	Report

Vietnam Youth Football Training Center, Hanoi
Referee: Yu Hong (China)

8 August 2025
16:00

Singapore	0–1	Kyrgyzstan
	Report	Gaparova 25'

Vietnam Youth Football Training Center, Hanoi
Referee: Choki Om (Bhutan)
8 August 2025
19:00

Hong Kong	0–6	Vietnam
	Report	Trương Thị Hoài Trinh 15', 34'; Ngân Thị Thanh Hiếu 46'; Nguyễn Thị Thùy Linh 65'; Lưu Hoàng Vân 67'; Đỗ Thị Thúy Nga 89'

Vietnam Youth Football Training Center, Hanoi
Referee: Kim Yu-jeong (South Korea)

10 August 2025
16:00

Hong Kong	3–1	Singapore
Leung Hong Kiu 26', 47'; Ko Pak Ling 62'	Report	Tsz Cheng 24' (o.g.)

Vietnam Youth Football Training Center, Hanoi
Referee: Yu Hong (China)
10 August 2025
19:00

Vietnam	3–0	Kyrgyzstan
Lưu Hoàng Vân 3'; Đào Khánh Vy 28'; Y Za Lương 74'	Report

Vietnam Youth Football Training Center, Hanoi
Referee: Kim Yu-jeong (South Korea)

=== Group C ===
- All matches were held in Tajikistan.
- Times listed are UTC+5.

Pos	Team	Pld	W	D	L	GF	GA	GD	Pts	Qualification
1	Australia	3	3	0	0	20	0	+20	9	Final tournament
2	Chinese Taipei	3	2	0	1	7	3	+4	6	Final tournament
3	Palestine	3	1	0	2	2	7	−5	3	
4	Tajikistan (H)	3	0	0	3	0	19	−19	0	

Source: AFC
Rules for classification: Qualification tiebreakers
(H) Hosts
6 August 2025
19:00

Chinese Taipei	4–0	Palestine
Kao Hsin 38'; Fu Chih-ling 50', 62', 75'	Report

Pamir Stadium, Dushanbe
Referee: Haneen Murad (Jordan)
6 August 2025
22:00

Australia	14–0	Tajikistan
Halmarick 3', 20', 42'; Younis 7'; Breier 22'; Caspers 28'; Ochildieva 31' (o.g.); Fuller 48'; Prakash 50' (pen.), 72'; Saveska 58', 82', 90+4'; Luchtmeijer 89'	Report

Pamir Stadium, Dushanbe
Referee: Dong Fangyu (China)

8 August 2025
19:00

Palestine	0–3	Australia
	Report	Trimis 8'; Luchtmeijer 68'; Lobo 80'

Pamir Stadium, Dushanbe
Referee: Haruna Kanematsu (Japan)
8 August 2025
22:00

Tajikistan	0–3	Chinese Taipei
	Report	Kao Hsin 6', 29'; Li Chun-mei 61'

Pamir Stadium, Dushanbe
Referee: Cha Min-ji (South Korea)

10 August 2025
19:00

Australia	3–0	Chinese Taipei
Lin Szu-ying 37' (o.g.); Halmarick 64', 76'	Report

Pamir Stadium, Dushanbe
Referee: Dong Fangyu (China)
10 August 2025
22:00

Palestine	2–0	Tajikistan
Abuasfar 36', 76'	Report

Pamir Stadium, Dushanbe
Referee: Mahnaz Zokaee (Iran)

=== Group D ===
- All matches were held in Myanmar.
- Times listed are UTC+6:30.

Pos	Team	Pld	W	D	L	GF	GA	GD	Pts	Qualification
1	India	3	2	1	0	8	0	+8	7	Final tournament
2	Indonesia	3	1	2	0	6	2	+4	5	
3	Myanmar (H)	3	1	1	1	8	4	+4	4	
4	Turkmenistan	3	0	0	3	1	17	−16	0	

Source: AFC
Rules for classification: Qualification tiebreakers
(H) Hosts
6 August 2025
16:00

Myanmar	6–1	Turkmenistan
Ei Thet Phyo 14', 28', 54'; Daisy Aung 25', 43'; Yin Loon Eain 65'	Report	Babaýewa 6'

Thuwunna Stadium, Yangon
Referee: Park Se-jin (South Korea)
6 August 2025
19:00

India	0–0	Indonesia
	Report

Thuwunna Stadium, Yangon
Referee: Nurul Ain Izatty Zainal (Malaysia)

8 August 2025
16:00

Indonesia	2–2	Myanmar
Ajeng 69'; Jezlyn 72'	Report	Yin Loon Eain 39'; Naing Naing Win 53'

Thuwunna Stadium, Yangon
Referee: Asaka Koizumi (Japan)
8 August 2025
19:00

Turkmenistan	0–7	India
	Report	Shubhangi 7', 42'; Sibani 14'; Toijam 35'; Sulanjana 38', 90+6'; Pooja 65'

Thuwunna Stadium, Yangon
Referee: Sunita Thongthawin (Thailand)

10 August 2025
16:00

Myanmar	0–1	India
	Report	Pooja 27'

Thuwunna Stadium, Yangon
Referee: Nurul Ain Izatty Zainal (Malaysia)
10 August 2025
19:00

Indonesia	4–0	Turkmenistan
Yumanda 10'; Shifana 27'; Ajeng 39'; Aulia 90+1'	Report

Thuwunna Stadium, Yangon
Referee: Doumouh Al Bakkar (Lebanon)

=== Group E ===
- All matches were held in China.
- Times listed are UTC+8.

Pos	Team	Pld	W	D	L	GF	GA	GD	Pts	Qualification
1	China (H)	3	3	0	0	21	0	+21	9	Final tournament
2	Lebanon	3	2	0	1	3	9	−6	6	
3	Syria	3	0	1	2	1	8	−7	1	
4	Cambodia	3	0	1	2	0	8	−8	1	

Source: AFC
Rules for classification: Qualification tiebreakers
(H) Hosts
6 August 2025
15:30

Lebanon	1–0	Cambodia
Hasno 63'	Report

Helan Mountain Stadium, Yinchuan
Referee: Jon Sol-mi (North Korea)
6 August 2025
19:35

China	6–0	Syria
Lu Jiayu 11', 30'; Zheng Lu 40'; Zhang Yiqian 45+3'; Xiao Yafei 53'; Li Ke 63'	Report

Helan Mountain Stadium, Yinchuan
Attendance: 10,379
Referee: Esraa Almbaiden (Jordan)

8 August 2025
15:30

Syria	1–2	Lebanon
Baddour 57'	Report	Hasno 19'; Ismail 64' (o.g.)

Helan Mountain Stadium, Yinchuan
Referee: Hyon Un-mi (North Korea)
8 August 2025
19:35

Cambodia	0–7	China
	Report	Lu Jiayu 7', 14'; Wang Aifang 54'; Zheng Lu 60'; Zhang Yiqian 61', 76'; Xiao Yafei 90+3'

Helan Mountain Stadium, Yinchuan
Attendance: 14,429
Referee: Oh Hyeon-jeong (South Korea)

10 August 2025
15:30

Cambodia	0–0	Syria
	Report

Helan Mountain Stadium, Yinchuan
Referee: Pak Un-jong (North Korea)
10 August 2025
19:35

China	8–0	Lebanon
Zheng Lu 7'; Liu Ling 17'; Zhang Yiqian 25'; Lu Jiayu 28', 38', 69'; Xiao Yafei 40'; Wang Aifang 75'	Report

Helan Mountain Stadium, Yinchuan
Attendance: 20,391
Referee: Khin Nyein Chan (Myanmar)

=== Group F ===
- All matches were held in Malaysia.
- Times listed are UTC+8.

Pos	Team	Pld	W	D	L	GF	GA	GD	Pts	Qualification
1	Japan	3	3	0	0	32	0	+32	9	Final tournament
2	Iran	3	2	0	1	5	11	−6	6	
3	Malaysia (H)	3	1	0	2	2	19	−17	3	
4	Guam	3	0	0	3	0	9	−9	0	

Source: AFC
Rules for classification: Qualification tiebreakers
(H) Hosts
6 August 2025
16:45

Japan	5–0	Guam
Nezu 6'; Fujisaki 10', 84'; Tsuge 44'; Tsuda 74'	Report

Kuala Lumpur Stadium, Kuala Lumpur
Referee: Mu Mingxin (China)
6 August 2025
20:45

Iran	3–0	Malaysia
Maryam 14', 28'; Asal 90+3'	Report

Kuala Lumpur Stadium, Kuala Lumpur
Referee: Veronika Bernatskaia (Kyrgyzstan)

8 August 2025
16:45

Guam	0–2	Iran
	Report	Maryam 14'; Parnia 59'

Kuala Lumpur Stadium, Kuala Lumpur
Referee: Alesar Baddour (Syria)
8 August 2025
20:45

Malaysia	0–16	Japan
	Report	Tsuda 6', 24', 31', 61'; Itamura 15', 18', 35'; Furuta 45+3', 46', 90+3'; Kojima 53', 59', 88'; Tsuge 63'; Kurimoto 68', 77'

Kuala Lumpur Stadium, Kuala Lumpur
Referee: Pansa Chaisanit (Thailand)

10 August 2025
16:45

Japan	11–0	Iran
Yokoyama 12'; Furuta 18'; Itamura 24', 43', 50'; Fujisaki 34', 52', 57'; Tsuda 62'; Takahashi 74', 90+1'	Report

Kuala Lumpur Stadium, Kuala Lumpur
Referee: Veronika Bernatskaia (Kyrgyzstan)
10 August 2025
20:45

Malaysia	2–0	Guam
Kaseh 64', 86'	Report

Kuala Lumpur Stadium, Kuala Lumpur
Referee: Mu Mingxin (China)

=== Group G ===
- All matches were held in Uzbekistan.
- Times listed are UTC+5.

Pos	Team	Pld	W	D	L	GF	GA	GD	Pts	Qualification
1	Uzbekistan (H)	3	2	1	0	19	3	+16	7	Final tournament
2	Jordan	3	2	1	0	15	4	+11	7	Final tournament
3	Northern Mariana Islands	3	1	0	2	4	14	−10	3	
4	Bahrain	3	0	0	3	0	17	−17	0	

Source: AFC
Rules for classification: Qualification tiebreakers
(H) Hosts
6 August 2025
17:30

Jordan	6–1	Northern Mariana Islands
Batayneh 2'; Al-Titi 45+1', 57', 59'; Abu Ali 82', 87'	Report	Elayda 74'

Do'stlik Stadium, Tashkent
Referee: Bùi Thị Thu Trang (Vietnam)
6 August 2025
20:30

Uzbekistan	8–0	Bahrain
Shodieva 3', 35'; Bakhtiyarova 23'; Mamatkulova 29'; Saydabbosova 55'; Al-Doseri 64' (o.g.); Al-Saffar 77' (o.g.); Dekanbaeva 78'	Report

Do'stlik Stadium, Tashkent
Referee: Isabella Blaess (Australia)

8 August 2025
17:30

Bahrain	0–6	Jordan
	Report	Batayneh 7', 90'; Al-Khawaja 24'; Al-Titi 27'; Ma'touq 74'; Al-Zurikat 81'

Do'stlik Stadium, Tashkent
Referee: Law Bik Chi (Hong Kong)
8 August 2025
20:30

Northern Mariana Islands	0–8	Uzbekistan
	Report	Nurmuhammadova 5', 73'; Egamberdieva 7', 54'; Aminjonova 28'; Dekanbaeva 37'; Bakhtiyarova 55'; Mamatkulova 80'

Do'stlik Stadium, Tashkent
Referee: Keomany Phengmeuangkhoun (Laos)

10 August 2025
17:30

Northern Mariana Islands	3–0	Bahrain
Chavez 22', 90+3'; Manahane 84'	Report

Do'stlik Stadium, Tashkent
Referee: Bùi Thị Thu Trang (Vietnam)
10 August 2025
20:30

Uzbekistan	3–3	Jordan
Bakhtiyarova 45+3'; Aminjonova 76'; Egamberdieva 84'	Report	Al-Zurikat 44'; Al-Khawaja 61'; Abu Hazeem 85'

Do'stlik Stadium, Tashkent
Referee: Isabella Blaess (Australia)

=== Group H ===
- All matches were held in Laos.
- Times listed are UTC+7.

Pos	Team	Pld	W	D	L	GF	GA	GD	Pts	Qualification
1	South Korea	3	3	0	0	16	1	+15	9	Final tournament
2	Bangladesh	3	2	0	1	12	7	+5	6	Final tournament
3	Laos (H)	3	1	0	2	3	4	−1	3	
4	Timor-Leste	3	0	0	3	0	19	−19	0	

Source: AFC
Rules for classification: Qualification tiebreakers
(H) Hosts
6 August 2025
16:00

South Korea	9–0	Timor-Leste
Kim Ye-eun 15', 20', 37'; Jin Hye-rin 45+3'; Lee Ha-eun 50', 89'; Bae Yoon-kyung 88'; Cho Hye-young 90+1'; Choi Ju-hong 90+3'	Report

New Laos National Stadium, Vientiane
Referee: Trần Thị Thanh (Vietnam)
6 August 2025
19:30

Bangladesh	3–1	Laos
Sagorika 36', 90+2'; Munki 59'	Report	Keo-onsy 87'

New Laos National Stadium, Vientiane
Referee: Fatemeh Nasiri (Iran)

8 August 2025
16:00

Timor-Leste	0–8	Bangladesh
	Report	Sikha 20'; Shanti 33'; Sagorika 36', 73'; Trishna 45+4', 57', 82'; Munki 90+6'

New Laos National Stadium, Vientiane
Referee: Roziyabonu Yusupova (Uzbekistan)
8 August 2025
19:00

Laos	0–1	South Korea
	Report	Kim Ye-eun 84'

New Laos National Stadium, Vientiane
Referee: Anjana Rai (Nepal)

10 August 2025
16:00

South Korea	6–1	Bangladesh
Lee Ha-eun 19', 87' (pen.), 90'; Cho Hye-young 48', 60'; Jin Hye-rin 90+6'	Report	Rani 15'

New Laos National Stadium, Vientiane
Referee: Anjana Rai (Nepal)
10 August 2025
19:00

Laos	2–0	Timor-Leste
Keo-onsy 17'; Khonesavanh 44'	Report

New Laos National Stadium, Vientiane
Referee: Wang Chieh (Chinese Taipei)

== Ranking of second-placed teams ==
Pos	Grp	Team	Pld	W	D	L	GF	GA	GD	Pts	Qualification
1	G	Jordan	3	2	1	0	15	4	+11	7	Final tournament
2	H	Bangladesh	3	2	0	1	12	7	+5	6	Final tournament
3	C	Chinese Taipei	3	2	0	1	7	3	+4	6	Final tournament
4	B	Hong Kong	3	2	0	1	5	8	−3	6	
5	F	Iran	3	2	0	1	5	11	−6	6	
6	E	Lebanon	3	2	0	1	3	9	−6	6	
7	D	Indonesia	3	1	2	0	6	2	+4	5	
8	A	Nepal	3	1	1	1	2	12	−10	4	

Source: AFC
Rules for classification: Qualification tiebreakers

== Qualified teams ==
The following 12 teams qualified for the final tournament.

Team	Method of qualification	Date of qualification	App.	Last	Previous best performance	Previous appearances in AFC U-20 Women's Asian Cup
Thailand	Hosts	14 April 2025	8th	2019	Fourth place (2004)	7 (2002, 2004, 2007, 2009, 2015, 2017, 2019)
North Korea	Group A winners	10 August 2025	12th	2024	**Champions** (2007, 2024)	11 (2002, 2004, 2006, **2007**, 2009, 2011, 2013, 2015, 2017, 2019, **2024**)
Vietnam	Group B winners	10 August 2025	7th	2024	Quarter-finalists (2004)	6 (2004, 2009, 2011, 2017, 2019, 2024)
Australia	Group C winners	10 August 2025	10th	2024	Third place (2006, 2024)	9 (2006, 2007, 2009, 2011, 2013, 2015, 2017, 2019, 2024)
India	Group D winners	10 August 2025	4th	2006	Quarter-finalists (2004)	3 (2002, 2004, 2006)
China	Group E winners	10 August 2025	12th	2024	**Champions** (2006)	11 (2002, 2004, **2006**, 2007, 2009, 2011, 2013, 2015, 2017, 2019, 2024)
Japan	Group F winners	10 August 2025	12th	2024	**Champions** (2002, 2009, 2011, 2015, 2017, 2019)	11 (**2002**, 2004, 2006, 2007, **2009**, **2011**, 2013, **2015**, **2017**, **2019**, 2024)
Uzbekistan	Group G winners	10 August 2025	6th	2024	Group stage (2002, 2004, 2015, 2017, 2024)	5 (2002, 2004, 2015, 2017, 2024)
South Korea	Group H winners	10 August 2025	12th	2024	**Champions** (2004, 2013)	11 (2002, **2004**, 2006, 2007, 2009, 2011, **2013**, 2015, 2017, 2019, 2024)
Jordan	Best runners-up	10 August 2025	2nd	2006	Group stage (2006)	1 (2006)
Bangladesh	2nd best runners-up	10 August 2025	1st	—N/a	—N/a	Debut
Chinese Taipei	3rd best runners-up	10 August 2025	6th	2024	Runners-up (2002)	5 (2002, 2004, 2007, 2009, 2024)

Key

Bold indicates champions for that year. Italic indicates hosts for that year.

== See also ==
- 2026 AFC Women's Asian Cup qualification
- 2026 AFC U-17 Women's Asian Cup qualification
- 2026 AFC U-17 Asian Cup qualification
- 2026 AFC U-23 Asian Cup qualification
