= 2024 AFC U-20 Women's Asian Cup qualification =

Tournament details
- Host countries: First round: Laos (Group A); Palestine (Group B); Kyrgyzstan (Group C); Jordan (Group D); Thailand (Group E); Vietnam (Group F); Cambodia (Group G); Bangladesh (Group H); Second round: Vietnam (Group A); Myanmar (Group B)
- Dates: First round: 6–12 March 2023; Second round: 3–10 June 2023
- Teams: 31 (Note: Final tournament hosts Uzbekistan are also included in the qualifiers, but all their games will count as friendlies.) (from 1 confederation)

Tournament statistics
- Matches played: 48
- Goals scored: 220 (4.58 per match)
- Attendance: 45,763 (953 per match)
- Top scorer(s): (Chinese Taipei) He Jia-shiuan (13 goals)

The 2024 AFC U-20 Women's Asian Cup qualification is a women's under-20 football competition that will determine the participating teams in the 2024 AFC U-20 Women's Asian Cup final tournament. Players born on or after 1 January 2004 are eligible to participate.

A total of eight teams will qualify to play in the final tournament. The host country and the top three teams of the previous tournament in 2019 will qualify automatically, while the other four teams will be decided by qualification. There will be two rounds of qualification matches, with the first round scheduled to be played between 4 and 12 March 2023, and the second round scheduled to be played between 3 and 11 June 2023.

== Draw ==
Of the 47 AFC member associations, a total of 31 teams entered the competition, with Japan, North Korea and South Korea automatically qualified for the final tournament by their position as the top three teams of the 2019 AFC U-19 Women's Championship qualification and thus not participating in qualification. The draw for the first round of the qualifiers was held on 3 November 2022, 14:00 MYT (UTC+8), at the AFC House in Kuala Lumpur, Malaysia.

The 31 teams were allocated to seven groups of four teams and one group of three teams, with teams seeded according to their performance in the 2019 AFC U-19 Women's Championship final tournament and qualification (overall ranking shown in parentheses; NR stands for non-ranked teams). A further restriction was also applied, with the eight teams serving as qualification group hosts drawn into separate groups.

Bye to final tournament and not participating in qualification
1. **Japan** (1)
2. **North Korea** (2)
3. **South Korea** (3)

Teams entering qualifying round
	Pot 1	Pot 2	Pot 3	Pot 4
Host Pot	Vietnam (6) **(H)**; Thailand (7) **(H)**	Kyrgyzstan (12) **(H)**; Jordan (14) **(H)**; Laos (16) **(H)**; Bangladesh (19) **(H)**		Cambodia (NR) **(H)**; Palestine (NR) **(H)**
Remaining Teams	Australia (4); China (5); Myanmar (8); Iran (9); Nepal (10); Lebanon (11)	Chinese Taipei (13); India (15); Malaysia (17); United Arab Emirates (18) **(W)**	Mongolia (20); Singapore (21); Hong Kong (22); Guam (23); Tajikistan (24); Pakistan (25) **(W)**	Bhutan (NR); Indonesia (NR); Iraq (NR) **(W)**; Northern Mariana Islands (Note: Due to pot 3 containing the six lowest-ranked teams and pot 4 containing the remaining nine unranked teams, two teams from pot 4 were randomly drawn as pot 3 teams: Northern Mariana Islands and Turkmenistan.) (NR); Philippines (NR); Turkmenistan (NR); **Uzbekistan** (NR) **(Q)**

Notes

- Teams in **bold** automatically qualified for the final tournament.
- Teams in italics advanced to second round.
- (H): Qualification first round group hosts
- (Q): Final tournament hosts, automatically qualified, but will participate in the Qualifiers. All of their matches in the Qualifiers will be deemed as friendlies.
- (W): Withdrew after the draw

Did not enter

- Afghanistan
- Bahrain
- Brunei
- Kuwait
- Macau
- Maldives
- Oman
- Qatar
- Saudi Arabia
- Sri Lanka
- Syria
- Timor-Leste
- Yemen

== Player eligibility ==
Players born between 1 January 2004 and 31 December 2008 are eligible to compete in the tournament.

== Format ==
In each group, teams play each other once at a centralised venue.

- In the first round, the eight group winners advance to the second round. However, the final tournament hosts Uzbekistan do not advance to the second round. Their matches will also not be taken into account when calculating the group ranking.
- In the second round, the two group winners and the two group runners-up qualify for the final tournament to join the four automatically qualified teams.

=== Tiebreakers ===
Teams are ranked according to points (3 points for a win, 1 point for a draw, 0 points for a loss), and if tied on points, the following tiebreaking criteria are applied, in the order given, to determine the rankings (Regulations Article 7.3):

1. Points in head-to-head matches among tied teams;
2. Goal difference in head-to-head matches among tied teams;
3. Goals scored in head-to-head matches among tied teams;
4. If more than two teams are tied, and after applying all head-to-head criteria above, a subset of teams are still tied, all head-to-head criteria above are reapplied exclusively to this subset of teams;
5. Goal difference in all group matches;
6. Goals scored in all group matches;
7. Penalty shoot-out if only two teams are tied and they met in the last round of the group;
8. Disciplinary points (yellow card = 1 point, red card as a result of two yellow cards = 3 points, direct red card = 3 points, yellow card followed by direct red card = 4 points);
9. Drawing of lots.

== First round ==
The first round was played from 6 to 12 March 2023.

=== Group A ===
- All matches were held in Laos.
- Times listed are UTC+7.

Pos	Team	Pld	W	D	L	GF	GA	GD	Pts	Qualification
1	China	3	3	0	0	20	0	+20	9	Second round
2	Philippines	3	1	1	1	3	8	−5	4	
3	Hong Kong	3	0	2	1	4	10	−6	2	
4	Laos (H)	3	0	1	2	2	11	−9	1	

Source: AFC
Rules for classification: Qualification tiebreakers
(H) Hosts
8 March 2023
16:00

China	6–0	Philippines
Huo Yuexin 9', 36'; Zou Mengyao 22'; Lu Jiayu 69'; Ouyang Yuhuan 74'; Qiao Ruiqi 82'	Report

National Stadium KM16, Vientiane
Attendance: 453
Referee: Choki Om (Bhutan)
8 March 2023
19:30

Laos	2–2	Hong Kong
Chaikham 5'; Sisa 87'	Report	Chan Tsz Shan 13'; Luk 81' (pen.)

National Stadium KM16, Vientiane
Attendance: 563
Referee: Plong Pich Akara (Cambodia)

10 March 2023
16:00

Hong Kong	0–6	China
	Report	Ouyang Yuhuan 29', 55', 90'; Lu Jiayu 36'; Huo Yuexin 68'; Qiao Ruiqi 82'

National Stadium KM16, Vientiane
Attendance: 210
Referee: Rebecca Durcau (Australia)
10 March 2023
19:30

Philippines	1–0	Laos
Yap 42'	Report

National Stadium KM16, Vientiane
Attendance: 415
Referee: Mahsa Ghorbani (Iran)

12 March 2023
16:00

Hong Kong	2–2	Philippines
Lee 24'; Anke Leung 45+1'	Report	Dizon 11'; Pasion 54'

National Stadium KM16, Vientiane
Attendance: 252
Referee: Azusa Sugino (Japan)
12 March 2023
19:30

China	8–0	Laos
Thippakone 1' (o.g.); Ouyang Yuhuan 1'; Yin Lihong 8'; Huo Yuexin 9', 36', 61', 67', 68'	Report

National Stadium KM16, Vientiane
Attendance: 638
Referee: Plong Pich Akara (Cambodia)

=== Group B ===
- All matches were held in Palestine.
- Times listed are UTC+2.

Pos	Team	Pld	W	D	L	GF	GA	GD	Pts	Qualification
1	Nepal	2	2	0	0	12	0	+12	6	Second round
2	Palestine (H)	2	1	0	1	3	7	−4	3	
3	Northern Mariana Islands	2	0	0	2	1	9	−8	0	
4	United Arab Emirates	0	0	0	0	0	0	0	0	Withdrew

Source: AFC
Rules for classification: Qualification tiebreakers
(H) Hosts
8 March 2023
15:00

Palestine	0–6	Nepal
	Report	Shahi 22' (pen.), 68', 75', 85'; G. Rai 30', 81'

Faisal Al-Husseini International Stadium, Al-Ram
Attendance: 180
Referee: Asaka Koizumi (Japan)

10 March 2023
15:00

Northern Mariana Islands	1–3	Palestine
K. Chavez 87'	Report	Qassis 50', 90+6'; El Zamamiri 61'

Faisal Al-Husseini International Stadium, Al-Ram
Attendance: 150
Referee: Supiree Testhomya (Thailand)

12 March 2023
15:00

Nepal	6–0	Northern Mariana Islands
Shahi 5', 19'; Bajracharya 6'; Sw. Hamal 30'; P. Rai 45'; Rana 90+3'	Report

Faisal Al-Husseini International Stadium, Al-Ram
Attendance: 90
Referee: Cha Min-ji (South Korea)

=== Group C ===
- All matches were held in Kyrgyzstan.
- Times listed are UTC+6.

Pos	Team	Pld	W	D	L	GF	GA	GD	Pts	Qualification
1	Australia	2	2	0	0	20	0	+20	6	Second round
2	Kyrgyzstan (H)	2	1	0	1	2	7	−5	3	
3	Guam	2	0	0	2	0	15	−15	0	
4	Iraq	0	0	0	0	0	0	0	0	Withdrew

Source: AFC
Rules for classification: Qualification tiebreakers
(H) Hosts
6 March 2023
20:00

Guam	0–13	Australia
	Report	Murray 5', 40'; Hollman 17', 37'; Johnson 28'; Kenney 45' (o.g.); Apostolakis 63'; Dos Santos 65'; Cicco 70', 90+3'; Grove 74'; Galic 79'; Murphy 85'

Dolen Omurzakov Stadium, Bishkek
Attendance: 10
Referee: Park Se-jin (South Korea)

8 March 2023
20:00

Kyrgyzstan	2–0	Guam
Akmatbekova 23'; Rysbekova 24'	Report

Dolen Omurzakov Stadium, Bishkek
Attendance: 300
Referee: Doumouh Al Bakkar (Lebanon)

10 March 2023
20:00

Australia	7–0	Kyrgyzstan
Dos Santos 4'; Murphy 21', 49'; Murray 24'; Murzakulova 34' (o.g.); O'Grady 37'; Briedis 90+8'	Report

Dolen Omurzakov Stadium, Bishkek
Attendance: 512
Referee: Sunita Thongthawin (Thailand)

=== Group D ===
- All matches were held in Jordan.
- Times listed are UTC+3.

Pos	Team	Pld	W	D	L	GF	GA	GD	Pts	Qualification
1	Lebanon	3	2	1	0	13	2	+11	7	Second round
2	Jordan (H)	3	2	1	0	5	1	+4	7	
3	Bhutan	3	1	0	2	6	7	−1	3	
4	Mongolia	3	0	0	3	1	15	−14	0	

Source: AFC
Rules for classification: Qualification tiebreakers
(H) Hosts
8 March 2023
15:00

Lebanon	6–2	Bhutan
Arabi 29'; Raed 39'; Fayad 43'; Maalouf 49'; Atallah 59' (pen.); Hamzi 85'	Report	Choeki 56'; Lhazom 61' (pen.)

Petra Stadium, Amman
Attendance: 25
Referee: Abirami Naidu (Singapore)
8 March 2023
19:00

Jordan	4–1	Mongolia
Batayneh 16'; Salameh 26', 30'; Owaisat 84'	Report	Enkhbold 73'

Petra Stadium, Amman
Attendance: 200
Referee: Yu Hong (China)

10 March 2023
15:00

Mongolia	0–7	Lebanon
	Report	Saade 2', 51'; Maalouf 9', 19', 23', 29'; Fayad 17'

Petra Stadium, Amman
Attendance: 50
Referee: Jhesa Kaatz (Philippines)
10 March 2023
19:00

Bhutan	0–1	Jordan
	Report	Hazem 23'

Petra Stadium, Amman
Attendance: 250
Referee: Thein Thein Aye (Myanmar)

12 March 2023
15:00

Mongolia	0–4	Bhutan
	Report	Lhazom 27', 45+1', 52', 70'

Petra Stadium, Amman
Attendance: 25
Referee: Nodira Mirzoeva (Tajikistan)
12 March 2023
19:00

Lebanon	0–0	Jordan
	Report

Petra Stadium, Amman
Attendance: 800
Referee: Yu Hong (China)

=== Group E ===
- All matches were held in Thailand.
- Times listed are UTC+7.
- Uzbekistan will compete in the qualifiers, but their matches will not be taken into account when calculating the group ranking.

Pos	Team	Pld	W	D	L	GF	GA	GD	Pts	Qualification
1	Chinese Taipei	2	2	0	0	17	0	+17	6	Second round
2	Thailand (H)	2	1	0	1	5	3	+2	3	
3	Tajikistan	2	0	0	2	0	19	−19	0	

Source: AFC
Rules for classification: Qualification tiebreakers
(H) Hosts
8 March 2023
16:30

Chinese Taipei	14–0	Tajikistan
He Jia-shiuan 2', 17', 20', 34', 40', 68', 69', 72', 74', 90+1'; Li Yi-wen 18', 31'; Liu Yu-chiao 33'; Lin Jing-xuan 56'	Report

Buriram City Stadium, Buriram
Attendance: 0
Referee: Kanika Barman (India)
8 March 2023
20:30

Thailand	2–0	Uzbekistan
Jidapha 56'; Jeena 83'	Report

Buriram City Stadium, Buriram
Attendance: 200
Referee: Lê Thị Lý (Vietnam)

10 March 2023
16:30

Uzbekistan	0–3	Chinese Taipei
	Report	Yang Hsiao-chuan 3'; Li Yi-wen 67'; Lin Jing-xuan 79'

Buriram City Stadium, Buriram
Attendance: 33
Referee: Khuloud Al Zaabi (United Arab Emirates)
10 March 2023
20:30

Tajikistan	0–5	Thailand
	Report	Jeena 5'; Supansa 44', 45+3'; Anaphon 62'; Saranya 67'

Buriram City Stadium, Buriram
Attendance: 150
Referee: Dong Fangyu (China)

12 March 2023
16:30

Tajikistan	0–4	Uzbekistan
	Report	Saydabbosova 20'; Oraniyazova 50', 90+3'; Rahmatullayeva 90+1'

Buriram City Stadium, Buriram
Attendance: 15
Referee: Bùi Thị Thu Trang (Vietnam)
12 March 2023
20:30

Thailand	0–3	Chinese Taipei
	Report	Chou Chieh-ni 6'; Liu Yu-chiao 48'; Parichat 50' (o.g.)

Buriram City Stadium, Buriram
Attendance: 300
Referee: Lê Thị Lý (Vietnam)

=== Group F ===
- All matches were held in Vietnam.
- Times listed are UTC+7.

Pos	Team	Pld	W	D	L	GF	GA	GD	Pts	Qualification
1	Vietnam (H)	3	2	1	0	15	1	+14	7	Second round
2	India	3	2	1	0	14	1	+13	7	
3	Indonesia	3	1	0	2	4	9	−5	3	
4	Singapore	3	0	0	3	0	22	−22	0	

Source: AFC
Rules for classification: Qualification tiebreakers
(H) Hosts
7 March 2023
15:00

India	7–0	Singapore
Narzary 7', 12'; S. Kumari 10'; A. Kumari 16', 31'; Oraon 24'; Dsouza 89'	Report

Việt Trì Stadium, Việt Trì
Attendance: 3,568
Referee: Mahnaz Zokaee (Iran)
7 March 2023
18:00

Vietnam	3–0	Indonesia
Lưu Hoàng Vân 2'; Hoàng Thị Ngọc Ánh 8'; Vũ Thị Hoa 37' (pen.)	Report

Việt Trì Stadium, Việt Trì
Attendance: 6,888
Referee: Kim Yu-jeong (South Korea)

9 March 2023
15:00

Indonesia	0–6	India
	Report	Neha 4', 22'; Dsouza 45'; Narzary 56'; S. Kumari 74', 90+1'

Việt Trì Stadium, Việt Trì
Attendance: 6,238
Referee: Anjana Rai (Nepal)
9 March 2023
18:00

Singapore	0–11	Vietnam
	Report	Ngọc Minh Chuyên 2', 55', 69', 90'; Tạ Thị Thuỷ 11', 14'; Erwan 26' (o.g.); Nguyễn Thị Hải Yến 47', 64'; Trần Nhật Lan 54'; Lưu Hoàng Vân 87'

Việt Trì Stadium, Việt Trì
Attendance: 6,789
Referee: Veronika Bernatskaya (Kyrgyzstan)

11 March 2023
15:00

Singapore	0–4	Indonesia
	Report	Helsya 11'; Marsela 37', 79'; Madjar 67'

Việt Trì Stadium, Việt Trì
Attendance: 2,288
Referee: Wang Chieh (Chinese Taipei)
11 March 2023
18:00

Vietnam	1–1	India
Trần Nhật Lan 45+2'	Report	B. Devi 12'

Việt Trì Stadium, Việt Trì
Attendance: 7,289
Referee: Kim Yu-jeong (South Korea)

=== Group G ===
- All matches were held in Cambodia.
- Times listed are UTC+7.

Pos	Team	Pld	W	D	L	GF	GA	GD	Pts	Qualification
1	Myanmar	2	2	0	0	5	1	+4	6	Second round
2	Cambodia (H)	2	1	0	1	1	2	−1	3	
3	Malaysia	2	0	0	2	1	4	−3	0	
4	Pakistan	0	0	0	0	0	0	0	0	Withdrew

Source: AFC
Rules for classification: Qualification tiebreakers
(H) Hosts
8 March 2023
16:00

Cambodia	0–2	Myanmar
	Report	Sandar Lin 50'; Nimol 64' (o.g.)

RSN Stadium, Phnom Penh
Attendance: 485
Referee: Yang Shu-ting (Chinese Taipei)

10 March 2023
16:00

Malaysia	0–1	Cambodia
	Report	Kimhong 90+3'

RSN Stadium, Phnom Penh
Attendance: 285
Referee: Saltanat Noroozi (Iran)

12 March 2023
16:00

Myanmar	3–1	Malaysia
Wai Hin Phyo 19', 86'; Yin Loon Eain 80'	Report	Hanim 58'

RSN Stadium, Phnom Penh
Attendance: 53
Referee: Edita Mirabidova (Uzbekistan)

=== Group H ===
- All matches were held in Bangladesh.
- Times listed are UTC+6.

Pos	Team	Pld	W	D	L	GF	GA	GD	Pts	Qualification
1	Iran	2	2	0	0	8	1	+7	6	Second round
2	Bangladesh (H)	2	1	0	1	4	1	+3	3	
3	Turkmenistan	2	0	0	2	1	11	−10	0	

Source: AFC
Rules for classification: Qualification tiebreakers
(H) Hosts
8 March 2023
17:00

Turkmenistan	1–7	Iran
Mingazowa 76'	Report	Zolfi 28', 42'; Jafari 37'; Foroozandeh 45+2', 67' (pen.), 90+1'; Rahimia 48'

Bir Sherestha Shipahi Mostafa Stadium, Dhaka
Attendance: 428
Referee: Công Thị Dung (Vietnam)

10 March 2023
17:00

Bangladesh	4–0	Turkmenistan
Ak. Khatun 45+2', 71'; Sa. Rani 80', 81'	Report

Bir Sherestha Shipahi Mostafa Stadium, Dhaka
Attendance: 3,442
Referee: Alesar Baddour (Syria)

12 March 2023
17:00

Iran	1–0	Bangladesh
Zandi 85'	Report

Bir Sherestha Shipahi Mostafa Stadium, Dhaka
Attendance: 2,369
Referee: Haruna Kanematsu (Japan)

== Second round ==
The draw for the second round of the qualifiers was held on 23 March 2023. The two group hosts were determined after the draw.

The eight teams were drawn into two groups of four teams, seeded according to their performance in the 2019 AFC U-19 Women's Championship final tournament and qualification.

Participating in qualification second round
Pot 1	Pot 2	Pot 3	Pot 4
1. **Australia** (4); 2. **China** (5)	3. **Vietnam** (6) **(H)**; 4. Myanmar (8) **(H)**	5. Iran (9); 6. Nepal (10)	7. Lebanon (11); 8. **Chinese Taipei** (13)

Notes

- Teams in **bold** qualified for the final tournament.
- (H): Qualification second round group hosts

The second round was played between 3 and 10 June 2023.

=== Group A ===
- All matches were held in Vietnam.
- Times listed are UTC+7:00.

Pos	Team	Pld	W	D	L	GF	GA	GD	Pts	Qualification
1	Australia	3	3	0	0	10	0	+10	**9**	Final tournament
2	Vietnam (H)	3	2	0	1	6	4	+2	**6**	Final tournament
3	Iran	3	1	0	2	4	7	−3	**3**	
4	Lebanon	3	0	0	3	1	10	−9	**0**	

Source: Global Sports Archive
Rules for classification: Qualification tiebreakers
(H) Hosts
3 June 2023
16:00

Australia	5–0	Lebanon
Johnson 10'; Ferris 16'; Dos Santos 80'; Saveska 90+1'; Cicco 90+3'	Report

Việt Trì Stadium, Việt Trì
Referee: Yu Hong (China)
3 June 2023
19:00

Vietnam	3–2	Iran
Hoàng Thị Ngọc Ánh 10'; Ngọc Minh Chuyên 37'; Lê Thị Trang 64'	Report	Nguyễn Thị Như Quỳnh 9' (o.g.); Foroozandeh 89' (pen.)

Việt Trì Stadium, Việt Trì
Referee: Veronika Bernatskaia (Kyrgyzstan)

5 June 2023
16:00

Iran	0–3	Australia
	Report	Johnson 28', 29'; Lobo 64'

Việt Trì Stadium, Việt Trì
Referee: Pansa Chaisant (Thailand)
5 June 2023
19:00

Lebanon	0–3	Vietnam
	Report	Ngọc Minh Chuyên 45+4', 80'; Lê Thị Bảo Trâm 76'

Việt Trì Stadium, Việt Trì
Referee: Ranjita Devi Tekcham (India)

7 June 2023
16:00

Iran	2–1	Lebanon
Foroozandeh 82', 90+4'	Report	Maalouf 45'

Việt Trì Stadium, Việt Trì
Referee: Pansa Chaisant (Thailand)
7 June 2023
19:00

Australia	2–0	Vietnam
Murphy 50', 55'	Report

Việt Trì Stadium, Việt Trì
Referee: Yang Shu-ting (Chinese Taipei)

=== Group B ===
- All matches were held in Myanmar.
- Times listed are UTC+6:30.

Pos	Team	Pld	W	D	L	GF	GA	GD	Pts	Qualification
1	China	3	3	0	0	11	0	+11	**9**	Final tournament
2	Chinese Taipei	3	1	1	1	6	2	+4	**4**	Final tournament
3	Myanmar (H)	3	1	1	1	6	6	0	**4**	
4	Nepal	3	0	0	3	0	15	−15	**0**	

Source: Global Sports Archive
Rules for classification: Qualification tiebreakers
(H) Hosts
6 June 2023
15:30

China	1–0	Chinese Taipei
Lu Jiayu 65'	Report

Thuwunna Stadium, Yangon
Referee: Haruna Kanematsu (Japan)
6 June 2023
18:30

Myanmar	5–0	Nepal
Zin Moe Pyae 22'; Yin Loon Eain 44', 46', 90'; Yoon Wadi Hlaing 70'	Report

Thuwunna Stadium, Yangon
Referee: Cha Min-ji (South Korea)

8 June 2023
15:30

Nepal	0–5	China
	Report	Ouyang Yuhuan 16'; Huo Yuexin 26'; Yin Lihong 45+4'; Lu Jiayu 45+6'; Yu Jiaqi 88'

Thuwunna Stadium, Yangon
Referee: Plong Pich Akara (Cambodia)
8 June 2023
18:30

Chinese Taipei	1–1	Myanmar
He Jia-shiuan 28'	Report	Zin Moe Pyae 26'

Thuwunna Stadium, Yangon
Referee: Azusa Sugino (Japan)

10 June 2023
15:30

Nepal	0–5	Chinese Taipei
	Report	Liu Yu-chiao 10'; Lai Yu-chi 20'; Shih Yi-ching 37'; He Jia-shiuan 41', 45+1'

Thuwunna Stadium, Yangon
Referee: Cha Min-ji (South Korea)
10 June 2023
18:30

China	5–0	Myanmar
Lu Jiayu 9'; Jiang Chenjing 36'; Huo Yuexin 41'; Zhao Xinyue 70', 75'	Report

Thuwunna Stadium, Yangon
Referee: Lê Thị Lý (Vietnam)

== Qualified teams ==
The following eight teams qualified for the final tournament.

Team	Qualified as	Qualified on	Previous appearances in AFC U-20 Women's Asian Cup^{1}
Uzbekistan	Hosts	5 July 2021	4 (2002, 2004, 2015, 2017)
Japan	2019 champions	5 July 2021	10 (**2002**, 2004, 2006, 2007, **2009**, **2011**, 2013, **2015**, **2017**, **2019**)
North Korea	2019 runners-up	5 July 2021	10 (2002, 2004, 2006, **2007**, 2009, 2011, 2013, 2015, 2017, 2019)
South Korea	2019 third place	5 July 2021	10 (2002, **2004**, 2006, 2007, 2009, 2011, **2013**, 2015, 2017, 2019)
Australia	Second round Group A winners	5 June 2023	8 (2006, 2007, 2009, 2011, 2013, 2015, 2017, 2019)
Vietnam	Second round Group A runners-up	5 June 2023	5 (2004, 2009, 2011, 2017, 2019)
China	Second round Group B winners	8 June 2023	10 (2002, 2004, **2006**, 2007, 2009, 2011, 2013, 2015, 2017, 2019)
Chinese Taipei	Second round Group B runners-up	10 June 2023	4 (2002, 2004, 2007, 2009)

^{1} Bold indicates champions for that year. Italic indicates hosts for that year.

== Goalscorers ==
There were 220 goals scored in 48 matches, for an average of 4.58 goals per match.

13 goals

- (Chinese Taipei) He Jia-shiuan

10 goals

- (China) Huo Yuexin

7 goals

- (Vietnam) Ngọc Minh Chuyên

6 goals

- (China) Ouyang Yuhuan
- (Iran) Hasti Foroozandeh
- (Lebanon) Christy Maalouf
- (Nepal) Dipa Shahi

5 goals

- (Australia) Alana Murphy
- (Bhutan) Deki Lhazom
- (China) Lu Jiayu

4 goals

- (Australia) Kahli Johnson
- (Myanmar) Yin Loon Eain

3 goals

- (Australia) Claudia Cicco
- (Australia) Jynaya Dos Santos
- (Australia) Emilia Murray
- (Chinese Taipei) Li Yi-wen
- (Chinese Taipei) Liu Yu-chiao
- (India) Apurna Narzary
- (India) Sumati Kumari

2 goals

- (Australia) Shay Hollman
- (Bangladesh) Aklima Khatun
- (Bangladesh) Sapna Rani
- (China) Qiao Ruiqi
- (China) Yin Lihong
- (China) Zhao Xinyue
- (Chinese Taipei) Lin Jing-xuan
- (India) Kajol Dsouza
- (India) Anita Kumari
- (India) Neha
- (Indonesia) Marsela Yuliana
- (Iran) Mohaddeseh Zolfi
- (Jordan) Rania Salameh
- (Lebanon) Sophie Fayad
- (Lebanon) Angelina Saade
- (Myanmar) Wai Hin Phyo
- (Myanmar) Zin Moe Pyae
- (Nepal) Garima Rai
- (Palestine) Miral Qassis
- (Thailand) Jeena Thongpan
- (Thailand) Supansa Trisutho
- (Uzbekistan) Leyla Oraniyazova
- (Vietnam) Hoàng Thị Ngọc Ánh
- (Vietnam) Lưu Hoàng Vân
- (Vietnam) Nguyễn Thị Hải Yến
- (Vietnam) Tạ Thị Thủy
- (Vietnam) Trần Nhật Lan

1 goal

- (Australia) Alexia Apostolakis
- (Australia) Ava Briedis
- (Australia) Gemma Ferris
- (Australia) Daniela Galic
- (Australia) Sasha Grove
- (Australia) Maya Lobo
- (Australia) Ella O'Grady
- (Australia) Sienna Saveska
- (Bhutan) Pema Choeki
- (Cambodia) Tun Kimhong
- (China) Jiang Chenjing
- (China) Yu Jiaqi
- (China) Zou Mengyao
- (Chinese Taipei) Chou Chieh-ni
- (Chinese Taipei) Lai Yu-chi
- (Chinese Taipei) Shih Yi-ching
- (Chinese Taipei) Yang Hsiao-chuan
- (Hong Kong) Chan Tsz Shan
- (Hong Kong) Alexis Lee
- (Hong Kong) Anke Leung
- (Hong Kong) Sean Luk
- (India) Babina Devi
- (India) Astam Oraon
- (Indonesia) Liza Madjar
- (Indonesia) Helsya Maeisyaroh
- (Iran) Rahil Jafari
- (Iran) Kimia Rahimia
- (Iran) Negin Zandi
- (Jordan) Arwa Batayneh
- (Jordan) Zaina Hazem
- (Jordan) Maya Owaisat
- (Kyrgyzstan) Adelia Akmatbekova
- (Kyrgyzstan) Medina Rysbekova
- (Laos) Sisa At Amphaylath
- (Laos) Chaikham
- (Lebanon) Zahwa Arabi
- (Lebanon) Julie Atallah
- (Lebanon) Hoda Hamzi
- (Lebanon) Waed Raed
- (Malaysia) Nurfarisya Hanim
- (Mongolia) Ankhtuya Enkhbold
- (Myanmar) Sandar Lin
- (Myanmar) Yoon Wadi Hlaing
- (Nepal) Sarah Bajracharya
- (Nepal) Saraswati Hamal
- (Nepal) Preeti Rai
- (Nepal) Jenifer Rana
- (Northern Mariana Islands) Kaithlyn Chavez
- (Palestine) Saba El Zamamiri
- (Philippines) Robyn Dizon
- (Philippines) Isabella Pasion
- (Philippines) Kylie Yap
- (Thailand) Anaphon Amanpong
- (Thailand) Jidapha Damri
- (Thailand) Saranya Lamee
- (Turkmenistan) Kamila Mingazowa
- (Uzbekistan) Sevinch Rahmatullayeva
- (Uzbekistan) Rukhshona Saydabbosova
- (Vietnam) Lê Thị Bảo Trâm
- (Vietnam) Lê Thị Trang
- (Vietnam) Vũ Thị Hoa

1 own goal

- (Cambodia) Somrit Nimol (against Myanmar)
- (Guam) Samantha Kenney (against Australia)
- (Kyrgyzstan) Nursuluu Murzakulova (against Australia)
- (Laos) Thippakone Syvonglath (against China)
- (Singapore) Siti Nurerwadah Erwan (against Vietnam)
- (Thailand) Parichat Thongrong (against Chinese Taipei)
- (Vietnam) Nguyễn Thị Như Quỳnh (against Iran)

== Overall ranking ==
The overall rankings for teams eliminated from the qualification will be used for seeding in the next tournament's qualifiers and final tournament. The results against the fourth-placed in four-team groups are not considered for this ranking.

Rnk	Grp	Team	Pld	W	D	L	GF	GA	GD	Pts
1	B	Myanmar	3	1	1	1	6	6	0	4
2	A	Iran	3	1	0	2	4	7	−3	3
3	A	Lebanon	3	0	0	3	1	10	−9	0
4	B	Nepal	3	0	0	3	0	15	−15	0
5	F	India	2	1	1	0	7	1	+6	4
6	D	Jordan	2	1	1	0	1	0	+1	4
7	H	Bangladesh	2	1	0	1	4	1	+3	3
8	E	Thailand	2	1	0	1	5	3	+2	3
9	G	Cambodia	2	1	0	1	1	2	−1	3
10	B	Palestine	2	1	0	1	3	7	−4	3
11	C	Kyrgyzstan	2	1	0	1	2	7	−5	3
12	A	Philippines	2	0	1	1	2	8	−6	1
13	A	Hong Kong	2	0	1	1	2	8	−6	1
14	G	Malaysia	2	0	0	2	1	4	−3	0
15	D	Bhutan	2	0	0	2	2	7	−5	0
16	B	Northern Mariana Islands	2	0	0	2	1	9	−8	0
17	F	Indonesia	2	0	0	2	0	9	−9	0
18	H	Turkmenistan	2	0	0	2	1	11	−10	0
19	C	Guam	2	0	0	2	0	15	−15	0
20	E	Tajikistan	2	0	0	2	0	19	−19	0
21	A	Laos	3	0	1	2	2	11	−9	1
22	D	Mongolia	3	0	0	3	1	15	−14	0
23	F	Singapore	3	0	0	3	0	22	−22	0

Updated to match(es) played on unknown. Source: AFC
Rules for classification: Qualification tiebreakers

== See also ==
- 2024 AFC U-17 Women's Asian Cup qualification
- 2024 AFC Women's Olympic Qualifying Tournament
