= 2022 AFC U-20 Women's Asian Cup =

Tournament details
- Host country: Uzbekistan
- Dates: Cancelled (originally 4–17 April 2022)
- Teams: 8 (from 1 confederation)

The 2022 AFC U-20 Women's Asian Cup was originally to be held as the 11th edition of the AFC U-20 Women's Asian Cup (including previous editions of the AFC U-19 Women's Championship), the biennial international youth football championship organised by the Asian Football Confederation (AFC) for the women's under-20 national teams of Asia, before being cancelled due to the COVID-19 pandemic.

Starting from the 2022 edition, the AFC agreed to the proposal for switching the tournament from under-19 to under-20. Moreover, the tournament was also rebranded from the "AFC U-19 Women's Championship" to the "AFC U-20 Women's Asian Cup". It was scheduled to be held in Uzbekistan between 4–17 April 2022. A total of eight teams were to compete in the tournament.

The AFC announced the cancellation of the tournament on 5 July 2021, leaving the hosting rights for the 2024 AFC U-20 Women's Asian Cup with Uzbekistan.

The top three teams of the tournament were to qualify for the 2021 FIFA U-20 Women's World Cup in Costa Rica as the AFC representatives. These same three teams - Japan, South Korea and North Korea - qualified for the 2022 FIFA U-20 Women's World Cup. However, the AFC subsequently announced that Australia would replace North Korea as one of the AFC's representatives.

== Qualification ==
The host country and the top three teams of the previous tournament in 2019 qualified automatically, while the other four teams would have been decided by qualification. There were to be two rounds of qualification matches, with the first round scheduled to be played between 14 and 22 August 2021, and the second round also scheduled to be played between 3–7 November 2021.

=== Qualified teams ===
The following teams qualified for the tournament.

Team	Qualified as	Appearance	Previous best performance
Uzbekistan	Hosts	5th	Group stage (2002, 2004, 2015, 2017)
Japan	2019 champions	11th	Champions (2002, 2009, 2011, 2015, 2017, 2019)
North Korea	2019 runners-up	11th	Champions (2007)
South Korea	2019 third place	11th	Champions (2004, 2013)

== Qualified teams for FIFA U-20 Women's World Cup ==
Japan, North Korea, and South Korea, the top three teams of the 2019 edition, originally qualified for the 2022 FIFA U-20 Women's World Cup.

On 16 March 2022, the AFC announced that Australia would replace North Korea as the AFC's representatives at the FIFA U-20 Women's World Cup.

Team	Qualified on	Previous appearances in FIFA U-20 Women's World Cup^{1}
Japan	6 November 2019	6 (2002, 2008, 2010, 2012, 2016, **2018**)
South Korea	9 November 2019	5 (2004, 2010, 2012, 2014, 2016)
Australia	16 March 2022	3 (2002, 2004, 2006)

^{1} Bold indicates champions for that year. Italic indicates hosts for that year.
