= 2026 AFC U-20 Women's Asian Cup =

ฟุตบอลหญิงชิงแชมป์เอเชีย รุ่นอายุไม่เกิน 20 ปี 2026

Tournament details
- Host country: Thailand
- Dates: 1–18 April 2026
- Teams: 12 (from 1 confederation)
- Venues: 3 (in 2 host cities)

Final positions
- Champions: Japan (7th title)
- Runners-up: North Korea
- Third place: China; South Korea

Tournament statistics
- Matches played: 25
- Goals scored: 93 (3.72 per match)
- Attendance: 3,490 (140 per match)
- Top scorer: (North Korea) Pak Ok-i (7 goals)
- Best player: (Japan) Noa Fukushima
- Best goalkeeper: (North Korea) Pak Ju-gyong
- Fair play award: Japan

The 2026 AFC U-20 Women's Asian Cup was the 12th edition of the AFC U-20 Women's Asian Cup (including previous editions of the AFC U-20 Women's Championship and AFC U-19 Women's Championship), the biennial international youth football championship organised by the Asian Football Confederation (AFC) for the women's under-20 national teams of Asia.

The tournament was held in Thailand from 1 to 18 April 2026. For the first time, the tournament was contested by twelve teams and there will be no third place playoff. The top four teams of the tournament would qualify for the 2026 FIFA U-20 Women's World Cup in Poland as the AFC representatives. North Korea were the defending champions, having won their second title in 2024. They were beaten in the final by Japan for their record-extending seventh title.

== Qualification ==
The host country qualified automatically. Eleven teams were decided by a single round of qualifying taking place between 2–10 August 2025.

=== Qualified teams ===
The following teams qualified for the tournament.

Team	Qualified as	Date of qualification	App.	Last	Previous best performance
Thailand	Hosts	14 April 2025	8th	2019	Fourth place (2004)
North Korea	Group A winners	10 August 2025	12th	2024	Champions (2007, 2024)
Vietnam	Group B winners	10 August 2025	7th	2024	Quarter-finalists (2004)
Australia	Group C winners	10 August 2025	10th	2024	Third place (2006, 2024)
India	Group D winners	10 August 2025	4th	2006	Quarter-finalists (2004)
China	Group E winners	10 August 2025	12th	2024	Champions (2006)
Japan	Group F winners	10 August 2025	12th	2024	Champions (2002, 2009, 2011, 2015, 2017, 2019)
Uzbekistan	Group G winners	10 August 2025	6th	2024	Group stage (2002, 2004, 2015, 2017, 2024)
South Korea	Group H winners	10 August 2025	12th	2024	Champions (2004, 2013)
Jordan	Best runners-up	10 August 2025	2nd	2006	Group stage (2006)
Bangladesh	2nd best runners-up	10 August 2025	1st	Debut	
Chinese Taipei	3rd best runners-up	10 August 2025	6th	2024	Runners-up (2002)

== Draw ==
The draw was held on 10 November 2025 at the AFC House in Kuala Lumpur, Malaysia. The twelve teams were drawn into three groups of four teams. The teams were seeded according to a points system derived from their final rankings across the previous three editions, with the hosts Thailand automatically seeded and assigned to Position A1 in the draw.

Pot 1	Pot 2	Pot 3	Pot 4
1. Thailand (hosts); 2. North Korea; 3. Japan	4. Australia; 5. South Korea; 6. China	7. Chinese Taipei; 8. Vietnam; 9. Uzbekistan	10. Jordan; 11. India; 12. Bangladesh

== Venues ==
The competition was played in three venues across two provinces.

Pathum Thani		Nonthaburi
Thammasat Stadium	Pathum Thani Stadium	Nonthaburi Province Stadium
Capacity: 25,000	Capacity: 15,114	Capacity: 10,000
2026 AFC U-20 Women's Asian Cup is located in Thailand

== Squads ==
Players born between 1 January 2006 and 31 December 2010 are eligible to compete in the tournament. Each team has to register a squad of minimum 18 players and maximum 23 players, at least three of whom must be goalkeepers (regulation articles 21.2 and 26.3).

== Match officials ==
The following match officials were appointed for the tournament.

Referees

- (Chinese Football Association) Mu Mingxin
- (Chinese Taipei Football Association) Yang Shu-ting
- (All India Football Federation) Ranjita Devi Tekcham
- (Japan Football Association) Azusa Sugino
- (Korea Football Association) Cha Min-ji
- (Jordan Football Association) Esra'a Al-Mbaidin
- (Lao Football Federation) Keomany Phengmeuangkhoun
- (Football Association of Malaysia) Nurul Ain Izatty Zainal
- (Myanmar Football Federation) Khin Nyein Chan
- (DPR Korea Football Association) Pak Un Jong
- (Syrian Football Association) Alissar Baddour
- (United Arab Emirates Football Association) Rawdha Al-Mansoori
- (Uzbekistan Football Association) Gulshoda Saidqulova
- (Vietnam Football Federation) Bùi Thị Thu Trang

Assistant referees

- (Bhutan Football Federation) Tshering Choden
- (Chinese Football Association) Wen Lili
- (Chinese Football Association) Wu Qiaoli
- (Japan Football Association) Saki Nakamoto
- (Japan Football Association) Miu Sone
- (Jordan Football Association) Islam Al-Abadi
- (Football Association of Malaysia) Munirah Ha Ali
- (Mongolian Football Federation) Battsetseg Unurjargal
- (Myanmar Football Federation) May Thet Phyu
- (Philippine Football Federation) Merlo Albano
- (Korea Football Association) Yoon Eun-hee
- (Football Federation of Sri Lanka) Malika Hathlahawatta Muhandiramalage
- (Football Association of Thailand) Suwida Wongkraisorn
- (Tajikistan Football Federation) Dilshoda Rahmanova
- (Vietnam Football Federation) Nguyễn Thị Hằng Nga

== Group stage ==
The top two teams of each group and the two best third-placed teams qualified for the quarter-finals.

Tiebreakers

Teams were ranked according to points (3 points for a win, 1 point for a draw, 0 points for a loss), and if tied on points, the following tiebreaking criteria are applied, in the order given, to determine the rankings (Regulations Article 9.3):

1. Points in head-to-head matches among tied teams;
2. Goal difference in head-to-head matches among tied teams;
3. Goals scored in head-to-head matches among tied teams;
4. If more than two teams are tied, and after applying all head-to-head criteria above, a subset of teams are still tied, all head-to-head criteria above are reapplied exclusively to this subset of teams;
5. Goal difference in all group matches;
6. Goals scored in all group matches;
7. Penalty shoot-out if only two teams are tied and they met in the last round of the group;
8. Disciplinary points (yellow card = 1 point, red card as a result of two yellow cards = 3 points, direct red card = 3 points, yellow card followed by direct red card = 4 points);
9. Drawing of lots.

All times are local, ICT (UTC+7).

=== Group A ===
Pos	Team	Pld	W	D	L	GF	GA	GD	Pts	Qualification
1	China	3	3	0	0	6	0	+6	9	Knockout stage
2	Thailand (H)	3	2	0	1	7	4	+3	6	Knockout stage
3	Vietnam	3	1	0	2	2	7	−5	3	Knockout stage
4	Bangladesh	3	0	0	3	2	6	−4	0	

Source: AFC
Rules for classification: Qualification tiebreakers
(H) Hosts
1 April 2026
16:00

China	3–0	Vietnam
Zheng Lu 39', 44'; Zeng Yujia 77'	Report

Nonthaburi Province Stadium, Nonthaburi
Attendance: 51
Referee: Alissar Baddour (Syria)
1 April 2026
20:00

Thailand	3–2	Bangladesh
Kurisara 69' (pen.); Rinyaphat 76' (pen.); Pichayatida 79'	Report	Sagorika 36', 50'

Thammasat Stadium, Pathum Thani
Attendance: 271
Referee: Azusa Sugino (Japan)

4 April 2026
16:00

Bangladesh	0–2	China
	Report	Yu Xingyue 47'; Wang Aifang 82'

Nonthaburi Province Stadium, Nonthaburi
Attendance: 110
Referee: Rawdha Al-Mansoori (United Arab Emirates)
4 April 2026
20:00

Vietnam	1–4	Thailand
Nguyễn Thị Thùy Linh 51'	Report	Kurisara 11', 41'; Rinyaphat 21', 90+3'

Thammasat Stadium, Pathum Thani
Attendance: 418
Referee: Pak Un Jong (North Korea)

7 April 2026
20:00

Thailand	0–1	China
	Report	Xiao Yafei 29'

Thammasat Stadium, Pathum Thani
Attendance: 444
Referee: Cha Min-ji (South Korea)
7 April 2026
20:00

Vietnam	1–0	Bangladesh
Nguyễn Thị Thùy Linh 49'	Report

Nonthaburi Province Stadium, Nonthaburi
Attendance: 36
Referee: Yang Shu-ting (Chinese Taipei)

=== Group B ===
Pos	Team	Pld	W	D	L	GF	GA	GD	Pts	Qualification
1	North Korea	3	3	0	0	19	0	+19	9	Knockout stage
2	South Korea	3	2	0	1	4	6	−2	6	Knockout stage
3	Uzbekistan	3	1	0	2	4	8	−4	3	Knockout stage
4	Jordan	3	0	0	3	1	14	−13	0	

Source: AFC
Rules for classification: Qualification tiebreakers
2 April 2026
16:00

South Korea	2–0	Uzbekistan
Jin Hye-rin 43'; Cho Hye-young 72' (pen.)	Report

Nonthaburi Province Stadium, Nonthaburi
Attendance: 18
Referee: Mu Mingxin (China)
2 April 2026
20:00

North Korea	8–0	Jordan
Ri Su-jong 1'; Kang Ryu-mi 4', 21', 71'; Choe Yon-a 41'; Pak Il-sim 45'; Pak Ok-i 48'; Ri Kuk-hyang 49'	Report

Pathum Thani Stadium, Pathum Thani
Attendance: 110
Referee: Keomany Phengmeuangkhoun (Laos)

5 April 2026
16:00

Jordan	1–2	South Korea
Al Zurikat 51'	Report	Jin Hye-rin 41'; Lee Ha-eun 43'

Nonthaburi Province Stadium, Nonthaburi
Attendance: 35
Referee: Ranjita Devi Teckham (India)
5 April 2026
20:00

Uzbekistan	0–6	North Korea
	Report	Jon Il-chong 9'; Jong Pok-yong 20'; Pak Ok-i 25', 42', 90+2'; So Ryu-gyong 60'

Pathum Thani Stadium, Pathum Thani
Attendance: 82
Referee: Nurul Ain Izatty Zainal (Malaysia)

8 April 2026
20:00

Uzbekistan	4–0	Jordan
Shodieva 22'; Dekanbaeva 26'; Turgunova 44', 85'	Report

Thammasat Stadium, Pathum Thani
Attendance: 17
Referee: Ranjita Devi Teckham (India)
8 April 2026
20:00

North Korea	5–0	South Korea
Kang Ryu-mi 37'; Pak Ok-i 45', 45+1'; Pak Il-sim 48'; Ho Kyong 51'	Report

Pathum Thani Stadium, Pathum Thani
Attendance: 46
Referee: Mu Mingxin (China)

=== Group C ===
Pos	Team	Pld	W	D	L	GF	GA	GD	Pts	Qualification
1	Japan	3	3	0	0	13	2	+11	9	Knockout stage
2	Australia	3	2	0	1	12	5	+7	6	Knockout stage
3	India	3	1	0	2	3	12	−9	3	
4	Chinese Taipei	3	0	0	3	1	10	−9	0	

Source: AFC
Rules for classification: Qualification tiebreakers
2 April 2026
16:00

Australia	5–0	Chinese Taipei
Halmarick 24', 50'; Fuller 44'; Trimis 53', 61'	Report

Pathum Thani Stadium, Pathum Thani
Attendance: 75
Referee: Gulshoda Saidqulova (Uzbekistan)
2 April 2026
20:00

Japan	6–0	India
Chanu 12' (o.g.); Kimura 54'; Fukushima 57'; Tago 75'; Matsunaga 81'; Y. Honda 87'	Report

Thammasat Stadium, Pathum Thani
Attendance: 47
Referee: Khin Nyein Chan (Myanmar)

5 April 2026
16:00

India	0–5	Australia
	Report	Halmarick 38' (pen.), 39', 48'; Butrus 54'; Brown 90+4'

Pathum Thani Stadium, Pathum Thani
Attendance: 66
Referee: Esra'a Al-Mbaidin (Jordan)
5 April 2026
20:00

Chinese Taipei	0–2	Japan
	Report	Suzuki 1'; Y. Honda 27'

Thammasat Stadium, Pathum Thani
Attendance: 112
Referee: Cha Min-ji (South Korea)

8 April 2026
16:00

Japan	5–2	Australia
Fukushima 45+3', 54'; Tago 65'; Kimura 81', 84'	Report	Prakash 39'; Brown 86'

Nonthaburi Province Stadium, Nonthaburi
Attendance: 199
Referee: Rawdha Al-Mansoori (United Arab Emirates)
8 April 2026
16:00

Chinese Taipei	1–3	India
Kao Hsin 90+3'	Report	Khumukcham 26'; Nongmeikapam 32', 87' (pen.)

Pathum Thani Stadium, Pathum Thani
Attendance: 30
Referee: Bùi Thị Thu Trang (Vietnam)

=== Ranking of third-placed teams ===
Pos	Grp	Team	Pld	W	D	L	GF	GA	GD	Pts	Qualification
1	B	Uzbekistan	3	1	0	2	4	8	−4	3	Knockout stage
2	A	Vietnam	3	1	0	2	2	7	−5	3	Knockout stage
3	C	India	3	1	0	2	3	12	−9	3	

Source: AFC
Rules for classification: Qualification tiebreakers

== Knockout stage ==
In the knockout stage, extra time and a penalty shoot-out were used to decide the winner if necessary.

=== Bracket ===
Quarter-finals
11 April – Pathum Thani (TS)
China	2
Uzbekistan	1
11 April – Pathum Thani (PTS)
Japan	4
Vietnam	0
12 April – Pathum Thani (PTS)
North Korea	3
Australia	0
12 April – Pathum Thani (TS)
Thailand	1
South Korea (a.e.t.)	2

Semi-finals
15 April – Pathum Thani (TS)
China	0
Japan	2
15 April – Pathum Thani (PTS)
North Korea	3
South Korea	0

Final
18 April – Pathum Thani (TS)
Japan	1
North Korea	0

=== Quarter-finals ===
The winners qualified for the 2026 FIFA U-20 Women's World Cup.

11 April 2026
16:00

Japan	4–0	Vietnam
Itamura 18', 61'; Tago 45+1'; Fukushima 45+2'	Report

Pathum Thani Stadium, Pathum Thani
Attendance: 86
Referee: Alissar Baddour (Syria)

11 April 2026
20:00

China	2–1	Uzbekistan
Zeng Yujia 29'; Yu Jiaqi 42'	Report	Egamberdieva 69'

Thammasat Stadium, Pathum Thani
Attendance: 89
Referee: Pak Un Jong (North Korea)

12 April 2026
16:00

North Korea	3–0	Australia
Pak Ok-i 3'; Sullivan 74' (o.g.); Ro Un-hyang 90'	Report

Pathum Thani Stadium, Pathum Thani
Attendance: 137
Referee: Gulshoda Saidqulova (Uzbekistan)

12 April 2026
20:00

Thailand	1–2 (a.e.t.)	South Korea
Casteen 72'	Report	Nam Seung-eun 16'; Park Ju-ha 106'

Thammasat Stadium, Pathum Thani
Attendance: 574
Referee: Azusa Sugino (Japan)

=== Semi-finals ===
15 April 2026
16:00

North Korea	3–0	South Korea
Pak Il-sim 24'; Kang Ryu-mi 34'; Choe Yon-a 84'	Report

Pathum Thani Stadium, Pathum Thani
Attendance: 65
Referee: Nurul Ain Izatty Zainal (Malaysia)

15 April 2026
20:00

China	0–2	Japan
	Report	Itamura 5'; Fukushima 24'

Thammasat Stadium, Pathum Thani
Attendance: 177
Referee: Khin Nyein Chan (Myanmar)

=== Final ===
18 April 2026
18:00

Japan	1–0	North Korea
Sano 56'	Report

Thammasat Stadium, Pathum Thani
Attendance: 195
Referee: Mu Mingxin (China)

== Goalscorers ==
There were 93 goals scored in 25 matches, for an average of 3.72 goals per match.

7 goals

- (North Korea) Pak Ok-i

5 goals

- (Australia) Skye Halmarick
- (Japan) Noa Fukushima
- (North Korea) Kang Ryu-mi

3 goals

- (Japan) Mao Itamura
- (Japan) Miki Kimura
- (Japan) Natsumi Tago
- (North Korea) Pak Il-sim
- (Thailand) Kurisara Limpawanich
- (Thailand) Rinyaphat Moondong

2 goals

- (Australia) Daisy Brown
- (Australia) Peta Trimis
- (Bangladesh) Mst Sagorika
- (China) Zeng Yujia
- (China) Zheng Lu
- (India) Sibani Nongmeikapam
- (Japan) Yura Honda
- (North Korea) Choe Yon-a
- (South Korea) Jin Hye-rin
- (Uzbekistan) Oydinoy Turgunova
- (Vietnam) Nguyễn Thị Thùy Linh

1 goal

- (Australia) Danella Butrus
- (Australia) Tiana Fuller
- (Australia) Avaani Prakash
- (China) Wang Aifang
- (China) Xiao Yafei
- (China) Yu Jiaqi
- (China) Yu Xingyue
- (Chinese Taipei) Kao Hsin
- (India) Bhumika Khumukcham
- (Jordan) Yasmeen Al Zurikat
- (Japan) Miyu Matsunaga
- (Japan) Momoka Sano
- (Japan) Haruko Suzuki
- (North Korea) Ho Kyong
- (North Korea) Jon Il-chong
- (North Korea) Jong Pok-yong
- (North Korea) Ri Kuk-hyang
- (North Korea) Ri Su-jong
- (North Korea) Ro Un-hyang
- (North Korea) So Ryu-gyong
- (South Korea) Cho Hye-young
- (South Korea) Lee Ha-eun I
- (South Korea) Nam Seung-eun
- (South Korea) Park Ju-ha
- (Thailand) Madison Casteen
- (Thailand) Pichayatida Manowang
- (Uzbekistan) Shahnoza Dekanbaeva
- (Uzbekistan) Mehribon Egamberdieva
- (Uzbekistan) Etibor Shodieva

1 own goal

- (Australia) Rubi Sullivan (against North Korea)
- (India) Thoibisana Chanu Toijam (against Japan)

== Qualified teams for the FIFA U-20 Women's World Cup ==
The following four teams from AFC qualified for the 2026 FIFA U-20 Women's World Cup in Poland.

Team	Qualified on	Previous appearances in FIFA U-20 Women's World Cup
Japan	11 April 2026	8 (2002, 2008, 2010, 2012, 2016, **2018**, 2022, 2024)
China	11 April 2026	6 (2004, 2006, 2008, 2012, 2014, 2018)
North Korea	12 April 2026	8 (**2006**, 2008, 2010, 2012, 2014, **2016**, 2018, **2024**)
South Korea	12 April 2026	7 (2004, 2010, 2012, 2014, 2016, 2022, 2024)

^{1} Bold indicates champions for that year. Italic indicates hosts for that year.

== See also ==
- 2026 AFC Women's Asian Cup
- 2026 AFC U-17 Women's Asian Cup
