= Guam women's national under-20 football team =

Guamanian women's football team

Guam Women's U-20
- Nickname: Masakåda
- Association: Guam Football Association
- Confederation: AFC (Asia)
- Sub-confederation: EAFF (East Asia)
- Head coach: (United States) Maggie Phillips
- Captain: Hannah Cruz
- FIFA code: GUM
First colors	Second colors

First international
- Japan 15–0 Guam (Goa, India; 19 April 2002)

Biggest win
- Guam 12–0 Maldives (Bishkek, Kyrgyzstan; 20 October 2018)

Biggest defeat
- Japan 15–0 Guam (Goa, India; 19 April 2002)

FIFA U-20 Women's World Cup
- Appearances: DNQ

AFC U-20 Women's Asian Cup
- Appearances: 2 (first in 2002)
- Best result: Group stage (2002, 2004)

The Guam women's national under-20 football team is the age of at U-20 female team which representative football team for Guam. The plays AFC U-20 Women's Asian Cup. The team has noy yet qualified FIFA U-20 Women's World Cup.

== History ==
The Guam women's national under-20 football team have played their debut match versus Japan on 19 April 2002 at Goa, India which they lost by 0–15 goals. They team has played first two edition of AFC U-20 Women's Asian Cup but result of the edition did not qualify.

== Current squad ==
The following squad were named for 2019 AFC U-19 Women's Championship qualification

No.	Pos.	Player	Date of birth (age)	Caps	Goals	Club
1	GK	Angelyn Sobrevilla	3 May 2003	0	0	(Guam Football Association)
2	DF	Abigail Salas	9 January 2002	0	0	(Guam Football Association)
3	DF	Celine Doronila	28 October 2003	0	0	(Guam Football Association)
4	DF	Isabella Bass	8 February 2003	0	0	(Guam Football Association)
5	DF	Richelle Ragadio	23 September 2003	0	0	(Guam Football Association)
6	DF	Sabrina Kenney	2 August 2003	0	0	(Guam Football Association)
7	MF	Isa Whalen	7 November 2002	0	0	(Guam Football Association)
8	MF	Shyann Roberto	13 September 2003	0	0	(Guam Football Association)
10	MF	Hannah Cruz	4 January 2003	0	0	(Guam Football Association)
12	FW	Lauren Phillips	6 December 2003	0	0	(Guam Football Association)
13	DF	Samantha Kenney	30 June 2003	0	0	(Guam Football Association)
14	DF	Ysabella Vasquez	20 February 2003	0	0	(Guam Football Association)
15	DF	Thea Baker	26 October 2003	0	0	(Guam Football Association)
16	DF	Aurianna Morellano	7 August 2003	0	0	(Guam Football Association)
17	DF	Ava Ramos	30 July 2003	0	0	(Guam Football Association)
18	MF	Rylee Guzman	12 January 2002	0	0	(Guam Football Association)
19	FW	Jinae Teria	28 September 2003	0	0	(Guam Football Association)
20	GK	Kiarra Hutcherson	6 December 2004	0	0	(Guam Football Association)
22	GK	Aeryn Anulao	26 January 2004	0	0	(Guam Football Association)

== Fixtures and results ==
legend

Win Draw Loss Fixture

== Competitive record ==
=== FIFA U-20 Women's World Cup ===
FIFA U-20 Women's World Cup record
Host	Result	Position	Pld	W	D	L	GF	GA
(Canada) 2002	Did not qualify							
(Thailand) 2004	Did not qualify							
(Russia) 2006	Did not qualify							
(Chile) 2008	Did not qualify							
(Germany) 2010	Did not qualify							
(Japan) 2012	Did not qualify							
(Canada) 2014	Did not qualify							
(Papua New Guinea) 2016	Did not qualify							
(France) 2018	Did not qualify							
(Costa Rica) 2022	Did not qualify							
(Colombia) 2024	Did not qualify							
(Poland) 2026	Did not qualify							
Total	0/12	0 Titles	0	0	0	0	0	0

*Draws include knock-out matches decided on penalty kicks.

=== AFC U-20 Women's Asian Cup ===
AFC U-20 Women's Asian Cup record
Host	Result	Position	Pld	W	D	L	GF	GA
(India) 2002	Group stage	12th	3	3	0	3	0	34
(China) 2004	Group stage	13th	3	0	0	3	0	20
(Malaysia) 2006	Did not qualify							
(China) 2007	Did not qualify							
(China) 2009	Did not qualify							
(Vietnam) 2011	Did not qualify							
(China) 2013	Did not qualify							
(China) 2015	Did not qualify							
(China) 2017	Did not qualify							
(Thailand) 2019	Did not qualify							
(Uzbekistan) ~~2022~~	Cancelled							
(Uzbekistan) 2024	Did not qualify							
(Thailand) 2026	Did not qualify							
Total	2/11	0 Titles	6	0	0	6	0	54

=== AFC U-20 Women's Asian Cup qualification ===
AFC U-20 Women's Asian Cup qualification record
Hosts / Year	Result	GP	W	D	L	GS	GA
(India) 2002	No qualifying tournament was play, directly qualified.						
(China) 2004	No qualifying tournament was play, directly qualified.						
(Malaysia) 2006	Did Not Participate						
(China) 2007	DNQ	3	0	0	3	3	8
(China) 2009	Did Not Participate						
(Vietnam) 2011	Did Not Participate						
(China) 2013	Did Not Participate						
(China) 2015	Did Not Participate						
(China) 2017	Did Not Participate						
(Thailand) 2019	DNQ	4	0	0	4	14	15
(Uzbekistan) ~~2022~~	Cancelled						
(Uzbekistan) 2024	To be determined						
Total	4/10	7	0	0	7	17	18
