= Chinese Taipei women's national under-20 football team =

National association football team

Chinese Taipei
- Association: Chinese Taipei Football Association (Chinese: 中華民國足球協會)
- Confederation: AFC (Asia)
- Sub-confederation: EAFF (East Asia)
- FIFA code: TPE
First colours	Second colours

First international
- Chinese Taipei 15–0 Hong Kong (Margao, India; 20 April 2002)

Biggest win
- Singapore 0–18 Chinese Taipei (Margao, India; 24 April 2002)

Biggest defeat
- United States 6–0 Chinese Taipei (Victoria, Canada; 21 August 2002); South Korea 6–0 Chinese Taipei (Chongqing, China; 5 October 2007); Chinese Taipei 0–6 South Korea (Tashkent, Uzbekistan; 6 March 2024)

FIFA U-20 Women's World Cup
- Appearances: 1 (first in 2002)
- Best result: Group stage (2002)

AFC U-20 Women's Asian Cup
- Appearances: 5 (first in 2002)
- Best result: (silver) Runners-up (2002)

The Chinese Taipei women's national under-20 football team is the national women's youth team representing Taiwan in international football competitions at the under-20 age category. The team is controlled by the Chinese Taipei Football Association (CTFA) and competes in youth tournaments organized by both the Asian Football Confederation and FIFA.

== History ==
Chinese Taipei made its debut at the inaugural AFC U-19 Women's Championship in 2002, finishing as runners-up to secure qualification for the first-ever FIFA U-20 Women's World Cup held in Canada. Alongside Japan, they became one of the first Asian teams to qualify for the tournament. In the 2004 edition, the team reached the quarter-finals, marking another strong regional showing. However, in 2006, Chinese Taipei failed to qualify after falling to Japan in the qualifying stage.

Despite returning to the final tournaments in the subsequent two editions, their performances declined. In both campaigns, the team finished bottom of their group without earning a point, struggling against regional rivals from East and Southeast Asia.

From 2009 onwards, Chinese Taipei failed to qualify for the final tournament for the next 15 years, marking a prolonged absence from the continental stage. They made their return in 2024, where they recorded a group stage exit, earning a victory against the host nation but suffering defeats to Australia and Korea Republic.

== Coaching staff ==
As of 6 August 2025

Position	Name
Head coach	(Taiwan) Hsieh Chih-chun
Assistant Coach(s)	(Taiwan) Chu Liang-yi; (Taiwan) Huang Po-wei; (Taiwan) Chung I-hsuan; (Taiwan) Liu Ju-hsin
Physiotherapist	(Taiwan) Yeh Ting-hui
Athletic Trainer	(Taiwan) Huang Tzu-yi
Team Manager	(Taiwan) Wang Yun-Hsun

== Players ==
=== Current squad ===
The following players were called up for the 2026 AFC U-20 Women's Asian Cup qualification, held in Tajikistan between 6 and 8 August 2025.

No.	Pos.	Player	Date of birth (age)	Club
1	GK	Jian Yu Jie		(Chinese Taipei Football Association) Fu Jen Catholic University
18	GK	Wang Ruo-ping	7 March 2006 (age 20)	(Chinese Taipei Football Association) CTBC Business School
23	GK	Peng Pei-qing		(Chinese Taipei Football Association) Hsing Wu High School
2	DF	Chian Wei-tong		(Chinese Taipei Football Association) CTBC Business School
3	DF	Li Chun-mei	3 August 2006 (age 20)	(Chinese Taipei Football Association) Hsing Wu University
8	DF	Li Yi-syuan		(Chinese Taipei Football Association) National Taiwan University of Sport
19	DF	Lin Szu-ying		(Chinese Taipei Football Association) Taichung Municipal Hui-Wen HS
20	DF	Lin Pin-hsin		(Chinese Taipei Football Association) Hsing Wu High School
22	DF	Chen Yi-fei		(Chinese Taipei Football Association) Hsing Wu High School
5	MF	Ma Ho-ya	2 May 2007 (age 19)	(Chinese Taipei Football Association) Hsing Wu High School
6	MF	Chang Meng-hsuan	7 November 2008 (age 17)	(Chinese Taipei Football Association) Hsing Wu High School
7	MF	Wu Ya-yu		(United States Soccer Federation) New Mexico State Aggies
10	MF	Kao Hsin	6 April 2007 (age 19)	(Chinese Taipei Football Association) Hsing Wu High School
11	MF	Liao Jie-ning		(Japan Football Association) Yamagatameisei High School
16	MF	Deng Jen-chi		(Chinese Taipei Football Association) Hsing Wu High School
21	MF	黄怡萍		(Chinese Taipei Football Association) Hsing Wu High School
4	FW	Lo Yu-hsiu		(Chinese Taipei Football Association) Taichung Municipal Hui-Wen HS
9	FW	Chuan Tzu-yu	4 November 2008 (age 17)	(Chinese Taipei Football Association) Hsing Wu High School
12	FW	Li Pei-yao		(Chinese Taipei Football Association) Hsing Wu High School
13	FW	Fu Chih-ling		(Chinese Taipei Football Association) Hsing Wu High School
14	FW	Huang Hui-shan		(Chinese Taipei Football Association) Taichung Municipal Hui-Wen HS
15	FW	Li Yong-shan		(Chinese Taipei Football Association) Taichung Municipal Hui-Wen HS
17	FW	Lin Yu-hui	26 April 2006 (age 20)	(Chinese Taipei Football Association) National Taiwan University of Sport

== Competitive record ==
=== FIFA U-20 Women's World Cup ===
FIFA U-20 Women's World Cup record
Host nation(s) and year	Round	Pos	Pld	W	D	L	GF	GA	Squad
(Canada) 2002	Group stage	12th	3	0	0	3	1	15	Squad
(Thailand) 2004	Did not qualify								
(Russia) 2006	Did not qualify								
(Chile) 2008	Did not qualify								
(Germany) 2010	Did not qualify								
(Japan) 2012	Did not qualify								
(Canada) 2014	Did not qualify								
(Papua New Guinea) 2016	Did not qualify								
(France) 2018	Did not qualify								
(Costa Rica) 2022	Did not qualify								
(Colombia) 2024	Did not qualify								
(Poland) 2026	Did not qualify								
Total	–	1/12	3	0	0	3	1	15	–

=== AFC U-20 Women's Asian Cup ===
AFC U-20 Women's Asian Cup record										Qualification record						
Host nation(s) and year	Round	Pos	Pld	W	D	L	GF	GA	Squad	Outcome	Pld	W	D	L	GF	GA
(India) 2002	Runners-up	2nd place, silver medalist(s)	5	2	2	1	35	3	Squad							
(China) 2004	Quarter-finals	6th	4	3	0	1	17	3	Squad							
(Malaysia) 2006	Did not qualify									2nd of 3	2	1	0	1	4	4
(China) 2007	Group stage	8th	3	0	0	3	0	13	Squad	1st of 4	3	3	0	0	14	0
(China) 2009	Group stage	8th	3	0	0	3	0	11	Squad	3rd of 5	4	2	0	2	10	6
(Vietnam) 2011	Did not qualify									3rd of 5	4	2	0	2	8	8
(China) 2013	Did not qualify									2nd of 4, 3rd of 4	6	3	1	2	16	7
(China) 2015	Did not qualify									3rd of 3	2	0	1	1	1	2
(China) 2017	Did not qualify									2nd of 4	3	2	0	1	8	3
(Thailand) 2019	Did not qualify									2nd of 4	3	2	0	1	9	4
(Uzbekistan) 2024	Group stage	6th	3	1	0	2	2	9	Squad	1st of 3, 2nd of 4	5	3	1	1	23	2
(Thailand) 2026	Group stage	11th	3	0	0	3	1	10	Squad	2nd of 4	3	2	0	1	7	3
Total:6/12	Runners-up	2nd	21	6	2	13	55	49	—	Total	35	20	3	12	100	39

== See also ==
- Chinese Taipei women's national football team
- Chinese Taipei women's national futsal team
- Chinese Taipei women's under-17 football team
