= Zhong Jinyu =

Chinese footballer

Personal information
- Date of birth: 5 April 1983 (age 43)
- Place of birth: Wuhua, Guangdong

International career
Years	Team	Apps	(Gls)
2004	China		

Zhong Jinyu (simplified Chinese: 钟金玉; traditional Chinese: 鐘金玉; pinyin: Zhōng Jīnyù; born April 5, 1983, in Wuhua, Guangdong) is a female Chinese football (soccer) player who competed at the 2004 Summer Olympics.

In 2004, she was a squad member of the Chinese team which finished ninth in the women's tournament.
