= 2024 AFC U-20 Women's Asian Cup =

AFC U-20 ayollar Osiyo kubogi 2024

Tournament details
- Host country: Uzbekistan
- Dates: 3–16 March 2024
- Teams: 8 (from 1 confederation)
- Venue: 2 (in 1 host city)

Final positions
- Champions: North Korea (2nd title)
- Runners-up: Japan
- Third place: Australia
- Fourth place: South Korea

Tournament statistics
- Matches played: 16
- Goals scored: 70 (4.38 per match)
- Attendance: 902 (56 per match)
- Top scorer(s): (Japan) Maya Hijikata (4 goals)
- Best player: (North Korea) Chae Un-yong
- Best goalkeeper: (North Korea) Chae Un-gyong
- Fair play award: Japan

The 2024 AFC U-20 Women's Asian Cup was the 11th edition of the AFC U-20 Women's Asian Cup (including previous editions of the AFC U-20 Women's Championship and AFC U-19 Women's Championship), the biennial international youth football championship organised by the Asian Football Confederation (AFC) for the women's under-20 national teams of Asia.

It was held in Uzbekistan between 3–16 March 2024. A total of eight teams competed in the tournament, with he top four teams of the tournament qualifying for the 2024 FIFA U-20 Women's World Cup in Colombia as the AFC representatives.

Japan were the defending champions. They were beaten 1–2 in the final by North Korea.

== Qualification ==
The host country and the top three teams of the previous tournament in 2019 qualified automatically, while the other four teams were decided by qualification. There were two rounds of qualification matches, with the first round played between 4–12 March 2023, and the second round played between 3–11 June 2023.

=== Qualified teams ===
The following teams qualified for the tournament.

Team	Qualified as	Appearance	Previous best performance
Uzbekistan	Hosts	5th	Group stage (2002, 2004, 2015, 2017)
Japan	2019 champions	11th	Champions (2002, 2009, 2011, 2015, 2017, 2019)
North Korea	2019 runners-up	11th	Champions (2007)
South Korea	2019 third place	11th	Champions (2004, 2013)
Australia	Second round Group A winners	9th	Third place (2006)
Vietnam	Second round Group A runners-up	6th	Quarter-finalists (2004)
China	Second round Group B winners	11th	Champions (2006)
Chinese Taipei	Second round Group B runners-up	5th	Runners-up (2002)

== Venues ==
The matches were played at two venues at Tashkent.

Tashkent
JAR Stadium	Do'stlik Stadium
Capacity: 8,500	Capacity: 10,000
2024 AFC U-20 Women's Asian Cup is located in Uzbekistan

== Draw ==
The draw was held on 15 December 2023 at the AFC House in Kuala Lumpur, Malaysia.

The eight teams were drawn into two groups of four teams. The teams were seeded according to their performance in the 2019 AFC U-19 Women's Championship final tournament and qualification, with the hosts Uzbekistan automatically seeded and assigned to Position A1 in the draw.

Pot 1	Pot 2	Pot 3	Pot 4
1. Uzbekistan (hosts); 2. Japan	3. North Korea; 4. South Korea	5. Australia; 6. China	7. Vietnam; 8. Chinese Taipei

== Squads ==
Players born between 1 January 2004 and 31 December 2008 were eligible to compete in the tournament. Each team had to register a squad of minimum 18 players and maximum 23 players, minimum three of whom must be goalkeepers (regulation articles 21.2 and 26.3).

== Group stage ==
All times are local, UZT (UTC+5).

Tiebreakers

Teams were ranked according to points (3 points for a win, 1 point for a draw, 0 points for a loss), and if tied on points, the following tie-breaking criteria are applied, in the order given, to determine the rankings:

1. Points in head-to-head matches among tied teams;
2. Goal difference in head-to-head matches among tied teams;
3. Goals scored in head-to-head matches among tied teams;
4. If more than two teams are tied, and after applying all head-to-head criteria above, a subset of teams are still tied, all head-to-head criteria above are reapplied exclusively to this subset of teams;
5. Goal difference in all group matches;
6. Goals scored in all group matches;
7. Penalty shoot-out if only two teams were tied and they met in the last round of the group;
8. Disciplinary points (yellow card = 1 point, red card as a result of two yellow cards = 3 points, direct red card = 3 points, yellow card followed by direct red card = 4 points);
9. Drawing of lots.

=== Group A ===
Pos	Team	Pld	W	D	L	GF	GA	GD	Pts	Qualification
1	Australia	3	3	0	0	7	1	+6	9	Knockout stage and 2024 FIFA U-20 Women's World Cup
2	South Korea	3	2	0	1	20	2	+18	6	Knockout stage and 2024 FIFA U-20 Women's World Cup
3	Chinese Taipei	3	1	0	2	2	9	−7	3	
4	Uzbekistan (H)	3	0	0	3	0	17	−17	0	

Source: AFC
Rules for classification: Group stage tiebreakers
(H) Hosts
3 March 2024
13:00

South Korea	1–2	Australia
Jeon Yu-gyeong 25'	Report	Trimis 73'; Chinnama 90'

Do'stlik Stadium, Tashkent
Attendance: 40
Referee: Asaka Koizumi (Japan)
3 March 2024
16:00

Uzbekistan	0–2	Chinese Taipei
	Report	He Jia-chuan 50'; Chen Yu-chin 90+1'

JAR Stadium, Tashkent
Attendance: 150
Referee: Lê Thị Ly (Vietnam)

6 March 2024
13:00

Chinese Taipei	0–6	South Korea
	Report	Jeon Yu-gyeong 28', 36'; Kim Shin-ji 54'; Bae Ye-bin 64'; Won Chae-eun 65', 79'

Do'stlik Stadium, Tashkent
Attendance: 55
Referee: Ranjita Devi Tekcham (India)
6 March 2024
16:00

Australia	2–0	Uzbekistan
Galić 5'; Trimis 38'	Report

JAR Stadium, Tashkent
Attendance: 80
Referee: Dong Fangyu (China)

9 March 2024
13:00

Uzbekistan	0–13	South Korea
	Report	Hong Chae-bin 8', 22', 34'; Yang Eun-seo 10', 49', 66'; Kim Ji-hyeon 20'; Hwang Da-yeong 45+2', 61'; Nam Seung-eun 70'; Kang Eun-young 74'; Eom Min-kyoung 83'; Jeon Yu-gyeong 89'

JAR Stadium, Tashkent
Attendance: 60
Referee: Dong Fangyu (China)
9 March 2024
13:00

Australia	3–0	Chinese Taipei
Nash 20'; Kruger 40'; Cicco 82'	Report

Do'stlik Stadium, Tashkent
Attendance: 42
Referee: Mahnaz Zokaee (Iran)

=== Group B ===
Pos	Team	Pld	W	D	L	GF	GA	GD	Pts	Qualification
1	North Korea	3	2	1	0	8	1	+7	7	Knockout stage and 2024 FIFA U-20 Women's World Cup
2	Japan	3	2	0	1	12	1	+11	6	Knockout stage and 2024 FIFA U-20 Women's World Cup
3	China	3	1	1	1	7	4	+3	4	
4	Vietnam	3	0	0	3	1	22	−21	0	

Source: AFC
Rules for classification: Group stage tiebreakers
4 March 2024
13:00

North Korea	1–1	China
Kim Song-gyong 84'	Report	Huo Yuexin 88'

Do'stlik Stadium, Tashkent
Attendance: 120
Referee: Pansa Chaisanit (Thailand)
4 March 2024
16:00

Japan	10–0	Vietnam
Matsukubo 11', 31', 44'; Hijikata 57', 64'; Tsujisawa 67'; Sasaki 70'; Sasai 73'; Yoneda 83'; Shirasawa 84'	Report

JAR Stadium, Tashkent
Attendance: 60
Referee: Kim Yu-jeong (South Korea)

7 March 2024
13:00

Vietnam	0–6	North Korea
	Report	Chae Un-yong 3'; Min Kyong-jin 5'; Pak Mi-ryong 14', 32'; Lê Thị Bảo Trâm 36' (o.g.); Hyon Ji-hyang 52'

Do'stlik Stadium, Tashkent
Attendance: 44
Referee: Sunita Thongthawin (Thailand)
7 March 2024
16:00

China	0–2	Japan
	Report	Hijikata 26'; Amano 88'

JAR Stadium, Tashkent
Attendance: 85
Referee: Kim Yu-jeong (South Korea)

10 March 2024
13:00

Japan	0–1	North Korea
	Report	Chae Un-yong 22'

JAR Stadium, Tashkent
Attendance: 70
Referee: Choki Om (Bhutan)
10 March 2024
13:00

China	6–1	Vietnam
Yu Jiaqi 11', 80'; Lu Jiayu 15', 76'; Xia Lejiao 17'; Huo Yuexin 82'	Report	Ngọc Minh Chuyên 74'

Do'stlik Stadium, Tashkent
Attendance: 65
Referee: Park Se-jin (South Korea)

== Knockout stage ==
In the knockout stage, extra time (excluding the third place match) and a penalty shoot-out are used to decide the winner if necessary.

All four teams that reached the knockout stage qualified for the 2024 FIFA U-20 Women's World Cup.

Semi-finals
13 March
Australia	1
Japan	5
13 March
North Korea	3
South Korea	0

Final
16 March
Japan	1
North Korea	2
Third place match
16 March
Australia	1
South Korea	0

=== Semi-finals ===
13 March 2024
16:00

Australia	1–5	Japan
Trimis 13'	Report	Yoneda 3'; Shiragaki 63'; Hijikata 83'; Sasai 88'; Chinnama 89' (o.g.)

JAR Stadium, Tashkent
Attendance: 88
Referee: Dong Fangyu (China)

13 March 2024
13:00

North Korea	3–0	South Korea
Choe Il-son 45'; Jong Kum 51'; Hwang Yu-yong 78'	Report

Do'stlik Stadium, Tashkent
Attendance: 78
Referee: Lê Thị Ly (Vietnam)

=== Third place match ===
16 March 2024
13:00

Australia	1–0	South Korea
Gooch 78'	Report

JAR Stadium, Tashkent
Referee: Asaka Koizumi (Japan)

=== Final ===
16 March 2024
18:00

Japan	1–2	North Korea
Tsujisawa 20'	Report	Jon Ryong-yong 44', 86'

JAR Stadium, Tashkent
Referee: Dong Fangyu (China)

== Goalscorers ==
There were 70 goals scored in 16 matches, for an average of 4.38 goals per match.

4 goals

- (Japan) Maya Hijikata
- (South Korea) Jeon Yu-gyeong

3 goals

- (Australia) Peta Trimis
- (Japan) Manaka Matsukubo
- (South Korea) Hong Chae-bin
- (South Korea) Yang Eun-seo

2 goals

- (China) Huo Yuexin
- (China) Yu Jiaqi
- (China) Lu Jiayu
- (Japan) Hiromi Yoneda
- (Japan) Chinari Sasai
- (Japan) Ai Tsujisawa
- (North Korea) Chae Un-yong
- (North Korea) Pak Mi-ryong
- (North Korea) Jon Ryong-jong
- (South Korea) Won Chae-eun
- (South Korea) Hwang Da-yeong

1 goal

- (Australia) Naomi Chinnama
- (Australia) Claudia Cicco
- (Australia) Daniela Galić
- (Australia) Jessika Nash
- (Australia) Zara Kruger
- (Australia) Lara Gooch
- (China) Xia Lejiao
- (Chinese Taipei) Chen Yu-chin
- (Chinese Taipei) He Jia-chuan
- (Japan) Rio Sasaki
- (Japan) Chinari Sasai
- (Japan) Yuri Shirisawa
- (Japan) Hiromi Yoneda
- (Japan) Suzu Amano
- (Japan) Uno Shiragaki
- (North Korea) Kim Song-gyong
- (North Korea) Hyon Ji-hyang
- (North Korea) Min Kyong-jin
- (North Korea) Choe Il-son
- (North Korea) Jong Kum
- (North Korea) Hwang Yu-yong
- (South Korea) Bae Ye-bin
- (South Korea) Kim Shin-ji
- (South Korea) Nam Seung-eun
- (South Korea) Kang Eun-young
- (South Korea) Eom Min-kyoung
- (South Korea) Kim Ji-hyeon
- (Vietnam) Ngọc Minh Chuyên

1 own goal

- (Australia) Naomi Chinnama (against Japan)
- (Vietnam) Lê Thị Bảo Trâm (against North Korea)

== Qualified teams for FIFA U-20 Women's World Cup ==
The following four teams from AFC qualified for the 2024 FIFA U-20 Women's World Cup in Colombia.

Team	Qualified on	Previous appearances in FIFA U-20 Women's World Cup^{1}
Japan	7 March 2024	7 (2002, 2008, 2010, 2012, 2016, **2018**, 2022)
Australia	9 March 2024	4 (2002, 2004, 2006, 2022)
South Korea	9 March 2024	6 (2004, 2010, 2012, 2014, 2016, 2022)
North Korea	10 March 2024	7 (**2006**, 2008, 2010, 2012, 2014, **2016**, 2018)

^{1} Bold indicates champions for that year. Italic indicates hosts for that year.

== See also ==
- 2024 AFC U-17 Women's Asian Cup
