= Thailand women's national under-20 football team =

Thailand U-20
- Association: FA Thailand
- Confederation: AFC (Asia)
- Sub-confederation: AFF (South-East Asia)
- Head coach: Nuengrutai Srathongvian
- FIFA code: THA
First colours	Second colours	Third colours

FIFA U-20 Women's World Cup
- Appearances: 1 (first in 2004)
- Best result: Group Stage (2004)

AFC U-20 Women's Asian Cup
- Appearances: 7 (first in 2002)
- Best result: Fourth Place (2004)

Thailand women's national under-20 football team participated at the 2004 FIFA U-19 Women's World Championship.

== Coaching staff ==
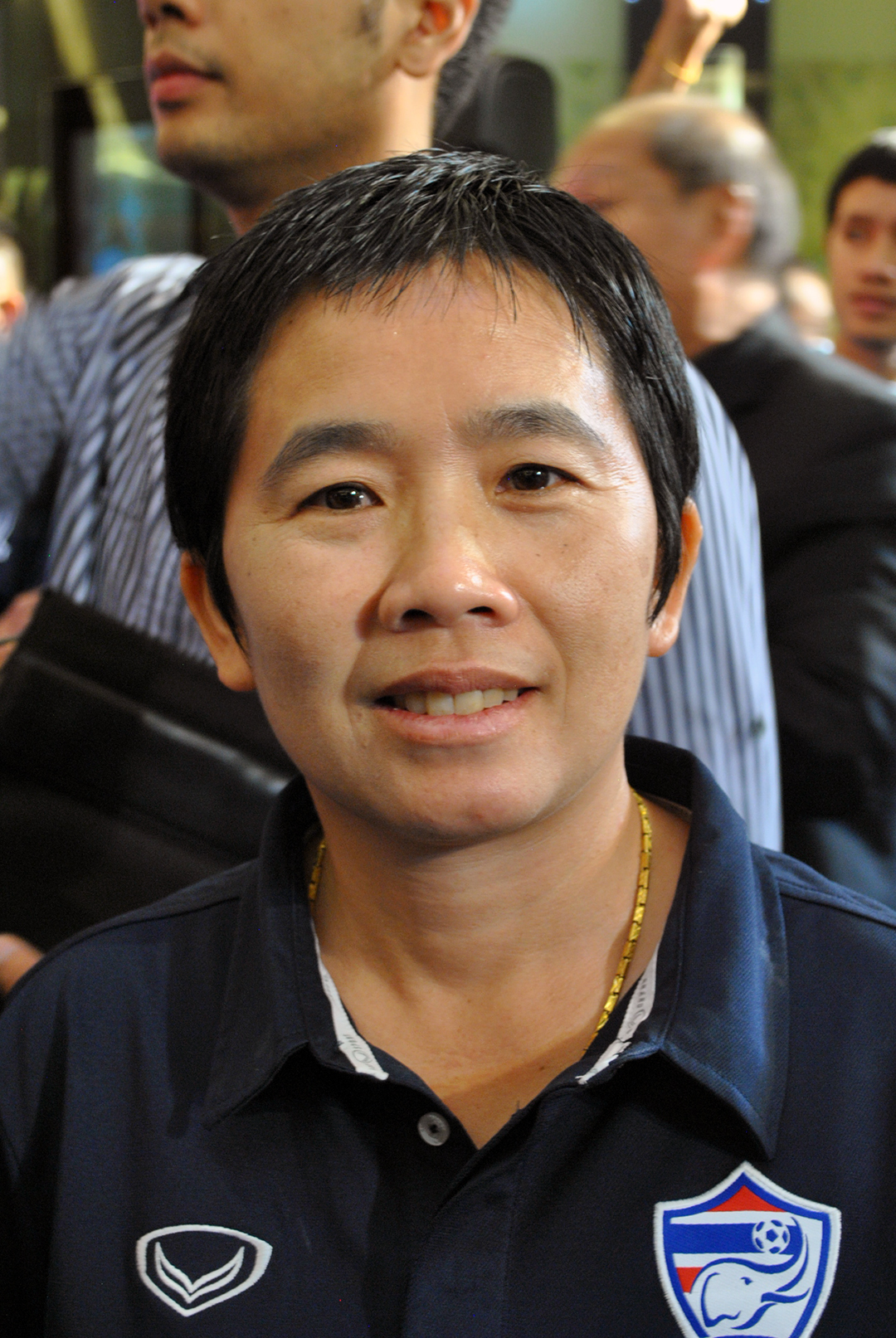
Nuengruethai Sathongwien, the current head coach of Thailand women's under-20 team.

== Competitive record ==
=== FIFA U-20 Women's World Cup ===
FIFA U-20 Women's World Cup record
Year	Round	GP	W	D	L	GF	GA
(Canada) 2002	Did not Qualify						
(Thailand) 2004	Group Stage	3	0	0	3	0	18
(Russia) 2006 to (Poland) 2026	Did not Qualify						
Total	Best: Group Stage	3	0	0	3	0	18

=== AFC U-20 Women's Asian Cup ===
AFC U-20 Women's Asian Cup record
Year	Round	GP	W	D	L	GF	GA
(India) 2002	Group Stage	3	1	0	2	2	12
(China) 2004	Fourth Place	6	3	0	3	14	15
(Malaysia) 2006	did not qualify						
(China) 2007	Group Stage	3	1	0	2	3	5
(China) 2009	Group Stage	3	0	0	3	1	11
(Vietnam) 2011	did not qualify						
(China) 2013	did not qualify						
(China) 2015	Group Stage	3	1	0	2	7	9
(China) 2017	Group Stage	3	0	1	2	2	13
(Thailand) 2019	Group Stage	3	0	0	3	2	8
(Uzbekistan) 2024	did not qualify						
(Thailand) 2026	Quarter-finals	4	2	0	2	8	6
Total:8/12	Best: Fourth Place	27	8	1	18	38	77

=== AFF U-19 Women's Championship/ASEAN U-19 Women's Championship ===
ASEAN U-19 Women's Championship record
Year	Result	Matches	Wins	Draws	Losses	GF	GA	Coach
(Thailand) 2014	Champions	5	4	1	0	36	1	Nuengrutai Srathongvian
(Indonesia) 2022	Third place	6	4	0	2	15	2	Miyo Okamoto
(Indonesia) 2023	Champions	4	4	0	0	16	2	Sawin Jaraspetcharanan
(Vietnam) 2025	Champions	5	5	0	0	25	4	Nuengrutai Srathongvian
Total	4/4	20	17	1	2	92	9	

=== AFF Women's Championship ===
AFF Women's Championship record
Year	Result	Pld	W	D	L	GF	GA
(Vietnam) 2004	Group Stage	3	1	1	1	12	1
Total	1/1	3	1	1	1	12	1

== Head-to-head record ==
The following table shows Thailand's head-to-head record in the FIFA U-20 Women's World Cup.

Opponent	Pld	W	D	L	GF	GA	GD	Win %
Australia	1	0	0	1	0	5	−5	0.00
Canada	1	0	0	1	0	7	−7	0.00
Germany	1	0	0	1	0	6	−6	0.00
Total	3	0	0	3	0	18	−18	0.00

== See also ==
- Thailand women's national football team
- Thailand women's national under-17 football team
