= Jiang Shuai =

Chinese footballer

Jiang Shuai (born June 7, 1982, in Qingdao, Shandong) is a female Chinese football player who competed for the national team in the 2008 Summer Olympics. Her position is that of defender.

== Major performances ==
- 2002 Asian Youth Championship - 3rd
- 2005 World University Games - 2nd
- 2005 National Games - 4th
- 2007 CFA Cup - 1st
- 2008 Asian Cup - 2nd
