= China women's national under-20 football team =

China U-20
- Association: Chinese Football Association
- Confederation: AFC (Asia)
- Head coach: (England) Colin Bell
- FIFA code: CHN
First colours	Second colours

FIFA U-20 Women's World Cup
- Appearances: 7 (first in 2004)
- Best result: Runners-up (2004, 2006)

AFC U-20 Women's Asian Cup
- Appearances: 12 (first in 2002)
- Best result: Champions (2006)

The China women's national under-20 football team represents the People's Republic of China in international football competitions in the FIFA U-20 Women's World Cup and the AFC U-20 Women's Asian Cup, as well as any other under-20 women's international football tournaments. It is governed by the Chinese Football Association.

== Honours ==
- FIFA U-20 Women's World Cup

Runners-up (2): 2004, 2006

- AFC U-20 Women's Asian Cup

Winners (1): 2006
Runners-up (1): 2004
Third-places (5): 2002, 2007, 2011, 2013, 2017

== Competition history ==
=== FIFA U-20 Women's World Cup ===
Year	Result	GP	W	D	L	GS	GA
(Canada) 2002	Did not qualify						
(Thailand) 2004	Runners-up	6	4	0	2	9	6
(Russia) 2006	Runners-up	6	4	1	1	10	6
(Chile) 2008	Group stage	3	1	1	1	2	2
(Germany) 2010	Did not qualify						
(Japan) 2012	Group stage	3	1	1	1	2	5
(Canada) 2014	Group stage	3	0	2	1	6	9
(Papua New Guinea) 2016	Did not qualify						
(France) 2018	Group stage	3	1	1	1	3	4
(Costa Rica) 2022	Did not qualify						
(Colombia) 2024	Did not qualify						
(Poland) 2026	Round of 16	4	1	2	1	7	4
Total:7/12	Runners-up	28	12	8	8	39	36

=== AFC U-20 Women's Asian Cup ===
AFC U-20 Women's Asian Cup								Qualification					
Hosts / Year	Result	M	W	D	L	GF	GA	M	W	D	L	GF	GA
(India) 2002	Third Place	5	3	0	2	37	2	no qualification					
(China) 2004	Runners-up	6	3	1	2	17	6	no qualification					
(Malaysia) 2006	Champions	5	3	1	1	33	2	automatically qualified					
(China) 2007	Third Place	5	3	1	1	10	5	automatically qualified					
(China) 2009	Fourth Place	5	2	1	2	5	4	automatically qualified					
(Vietnam) 2011	Third Place	5	2	2	1	7	8	automatically qualified					
(China) 2013	Third Place	5	2	2	1	14	6	automatically qualified					
(China) 2015	Fourth Place	5	2	0	3	13	10	automatically qualified					
(China) 2017	Third Place	5	3	0	2	7	7	automatically qualified					
(Thailand) 2019	Group stage	3	1	0	2	7	5	automatically qualified					
(Uzbekistan) 2024	Group stage	3	1	1	1	7	4	6	6	0	0	31	0
(Thailand) 2026	Semi-finals	5	4	0	1	8	3	3	3	0	0	21	0
Total	12/12	56	29	9	19	165	62	9	9	0	0	52	0

== Recent matches ==
=== 2026 ===
In preparation for the 2026 U-20 World Cup in Poland, they played a friendly game in Germany against SG Andernach's Reserve Team (2. Team) on Wednesday 6 May 2026 at 6.30pm (german time), losing 4-1 to the 3rd-Division side on their Tour through the country.

Goals: 1-0 Joelina Martini (7.) 2-0 Joelina Martini (9.) 2-1 Nr. 10 China (32.) 3-1 Hannah Marie Happ (41.) 4-1 Leonie Krump (82.)

== Head-to-head record ==
The following table shows China's head-to-head record in the FIFA U-20 Women's World Cup.

Opponent	Pld	W	D	L	GF	GA	GD	Win %
Argentina	1	0	1	0	0	0	+0	0.00
Brazil	3	1	1	1	4	3	+1	33.33
Canada	2	2	0	0	4	1	+3	100.00
Finland	1	1	0	0	2	1	+1	100.00
France	1	0	0	1	0	2	−2	0.00
Germany	4	0	1	3	5	13	−8	0.00
Ghana	1	1	0	0	1	0	+1	100.00
Haiti	1	1	0	0	2	1	+1	100.00
Italy	2	1	1	0	3	2	+1	50.00
New Caledonia	1	1	0	0	5	0	+5	100.00
Nigeria	4	2	2	0	5	1	+4	50.00
North Korea	1	0	0	1	0	5	−5	0.00
Russia	1	1	0	0	4	0	+4	100.00
Spain	1	0	0	1	1	3	−2	0.00
United States	4	1	2	1	3	4	−1	25.00
Total	28	12	8	8	39	36	+3	42.86
