= 2019 AFC U-19 Women's Championship =

ฟุตบอลหญิงชิงชนะเลิศแห่งเอเชีย รุ่นอายุไม่เกิน 19 ปี 2019

Tournament details
- Host country: Thailand
- Dates: 27 October – 9 November
- Teams: 8 (from 1 confederation)
- Venue: 2 (in 1 host city)

Final positions
- Champions: Japan (6th title)
- Runners-up: North Korea
- Third place: South Korea
- Fourth place: Australia

Tournament statistics
- Matches played: 16
- Goals scored: 64 (4 per match)
- Attendance: 2,282 (143 per match)
- Top scorer: (South Korea) Kang Ji-woo (7 goals)
- Best player: (Japan) Oto Kanno
- Fair play award: Japan

The 2019 AFC U-19 Women's Championship was the 10th edition of the AFC U-19 Women's Championship, the biennial international youth football championship organised by the Asian Football Confederation (AFC) for the women's under-19 national teams of Asia. The tournament was held in Thailand between 27 October and 9 November 2019, with a total of eight teams competing.

The top three teams of the tournament would have qualified for the 2021 FIFA U-20 Women's World Cup (originally 2020 but postponed due to COVID-19 pandemic) in Costa Rica as the AFC representatives. However, FIFA announced on 17 November 2020 that this edition of the World Cup would be cancelled.

This edition was the last to be played as an under-19 tournament, as the AFC had agreed to the proposal for switching the tournament from under-19 to under-20 starting from 2022.

Japan are the defending champions.

== Qualification ==
Four teams qualified directly for the final tournament: the hosts and the top three of 2017. The other four spots were determined by the qualifying stage.

A total of 27 teams entered the qualifying stage. Due to the increased number of teams, two qualification rounds were scheduled for the first time. The first round was scheduled for 20–28 October 2018, and the second round was scheduled for 22–30 April 2019.

=== Qualified teams ===
The following teams qualified for the tournament.

Team	Qualified as	Appearance	Previous best performance
Thailand	Hosts	7th	Fourth place (2004)
Japan	2017 champions	10th	Champions (2002, 2009, 2011, 2015, 2017)
North Korea	2017 runners-up	10th	Champions (2007)
China	2017 third place	10th	Champions (2006)
Australia	Second round Group A winners	8th	Third place (2006)
Myanmar	Second round Group A runners-up	4th	Group stage (2002, 2007, 2013)
South Korea	Second round Group B winners	10th	Champions (2004, 2013)
Vietnam	Second round Group B runners-up	5th	Quarter-finals (2004)

== Venues ==
The matches were played at two venues, both at the Mueang Chonburi District in Chonburi Province.

- Chonburi Stadium
- IPE Chonburi Stadium

Chonburi
Chonburi Stadium	IPE Chonburi Stadium
Capacity: 8,680	Capacity: 11,000
2019 AFC U-19 Women's Championship is located in Thailand

== Draw ==
The draw was held on 23 May 2019, 16:30 ICT (UTC+7), at the Oakwood Hotel in Chonburi, Thailand. The eight teams were drawn into two groups of four teams. The teams were seeded according to their performance in the 2017 AFC U-19 Women's Championship final tournament and qualification, with the hosts Thailand automatically seeded and assigned to Position A1 in the draw.

Pot 1	Pot 2	Pot 3	Pot 4
1. Thailand (hosts); 2. Japan	3. North Korea; 4. China	5. Australia; 6. South Korea	7. Vietnam; 8. Myanmar

== Squads ==
Players born between 1 January 2000 and 31 December 2004 were eligible to compete in the tournament. Each team had to register a squad of minimum 18 players and maximum 23 players, minimum three of whom must be goalkeepers (Regulations Articles 24.1 and 24.2).

== Group stage ==
The top two teams of each group advanced to the semi-finals.

Tiebreakers

Teams were ranked according to points (3 points for a win, 1 point for a draw, 0 points for a loss), and if tied on points, the following tiebreaking criteria are applied, in the order given, to determine the rankings (Regulations Article 9.3):

1. Points in head-to-head matches among tied teams;
2. Goal difference in head-to-head matches among tied teams;
3. Goals scored in head-to-head matches among tied teams;
4. If more than two teams are tied, and after applying all head-to-head criteria above, a subset of teams are still tied, all head-to-head criteria above are reapplied exclusively to this subset of teams;
5. Goal difference in all group matches;
6. Goals scored in all group matches;
7. Penalty shoot-out if only two teams are tied and they met in the last round of the group;
8. Disciplinary points (yellow card = 1 point, red card as a result of two yellow cards = 3 points, direct red card = 3 points, yellow card followed by direct red card = 4 points);
9. Drawing of lots.

All times are local, ICT (UTC+7).

=== Group A ===
Pos	Team	Pld	W	D	L	GF	GA	GD	Pts	Qualification
1	North Korea	3	3	0	0	11	2	+9	9	Knockout stage
2	Australia	3	2	0	1	5	6	−1	6	Knockout stage
3	Vietnam	3	1	0	2	2	4	−2	3	
4	Thailand (H)	3	0	0	3	2	8	−6	0	

Source: AFC
Rules for classification: Group stage tiebreakers
(H) Hosts
27 October 2019
16:00

North Korea	5–1	Australia
Kim Hyang 19'; Yun Ji-hwa 30'; Ri Kum-hyang 74'; Pak Il-gyong 83'; Kim Yun-ok 88'	Report	Cooney-Cross 16'

IPE Chonburi Stadium, Chonburi
Attendance: 170
Referee: Edita Mirabidova (Uzbekistan)
27 October 2019
19:00

Thailand	0–2	Vietnam
	Report	Nguyễn Thị Tuyết Ngân 58' (pen.); Ngân Thị Vạn Sự 90+2'

Chonburi Stadium, Chonburi
Attendance: 200
Referee: Oh Hyeon-jeong (South Korea)

30 October 2019
16:00

Vietnam	0–3	North Korea
	Report	Yun Ji-hwa 47'; Kim Kyong-yong 61'; Ryu Sol-song 70'

IPE Chonburi Stadium, Chonburi
Attendance: 50
Referee: Fusako Kajiyama (Japan)
30 October 2019
19:00

Australia	3–1	Thailand
M. Fowler 17', 41'; Nevin 56'	Report	Pattaranan 63'

Chonburi Stadium, Chonburi
Attendance: 280
Referee: Mahsa Ghorbani (Iran)

2 November 2019
16:00

Thailand	1–3	North Korea
Nutwadee 59'	Report	Kim Kyong-yong 5'; Ri Chong-gyong 27'; Ri Su-gyong 47'

Chonburi Stadium, Chonburi
Attendance: 200
Referee: Mahsa Ghorbani (Iran)
2 November 2019
16:00

Australia	1–0	Vietnam
M. Fowler 84'	Report

IPE Chonburi Stadium, Chonburi
Attendance: 90
Referee: Oh Hyeon-jeong (South Korea)

=== Group B ===
Pos	Team	Pld	W	D	L	GF	GA	GD	Pts	Qualification
1	Japan	3	3	0	0	9	1	+8	9	Knockout stage
2	South Korea	3	2	0	1	3	3	0	6	Knockout stage
3	China	3	1	0	2	7	5	+2	3	
4	Myanmar	3	0	0	3	1	11	−10	0	

Source: AFC
Rules for classification: Group stage tiebreakers
28 October 2019
16:00

Japan	5–0	Myanmar
Yamamoto 36', 49'; Osawa 39'; Hirosawa 66'; Itō 67'	Report

IPE Chonburi Stadium, Chonburi
Attendance: 120
Referee: Pansa Chaisanit (Thailand)
28 October 2019
19:00

China	1–2	South Korea
Han Xuan 34'	Report	Kang Ji-woo 1', 72'

Chonburi Stadium, Chonburi
Attendance: 100
Referee: Abirami Naidu (Singapore)

31 October 2019
16:00

Myanmar	1–5	China
San Thaw Thaw 73'	Report	Yao Mengjia 5'; Yang Qian 52', 62'; Wang Linlin 70' (pen.); Han Xuan 90+1'

IPE Chonburi Stadium, Chonburi
Attendance: 80
Referee: Pak Un-jong (North Korea)
31 October 2019
19:00

South Korea	0–2	Japan
	Report	Kanno 16'; Yamamoto 84'

Chonburi Stadium, Chonburi
Attendance: 150
Referee: Ranjita Devi Tekcham (India)

3 November 2019
16:00

Japan	2–1	China
Kato 10'; Morita 70'	Report	Sun Pingwei 72'

Chonburi Stadium, Chonburi
Attendance: 200
Referee: Edita Mirabidova (Uzbekistan)
3 November 2019
16:00

South Korea	1–0	Myanmar
Lee Jeong-min 79'	Report

IPE Chonburi Stadium, Chonburi
Attendance: 72
Referee: Abirami Naidu (Singapore)

== Knockout stage ==
In the knockout stage, extra time and penalty shoot-out were used to decide the winner if necessary, except for the third place match where there was no extra time and penalty shoot-out was used to decide the winner if necessary (Regulations Articles 12.1, 12.2 and 12.3).

=== Bracket ===
Semi-finals
6 November – Chonburi
North Korea	3
South Korea	1
6 November – Chonburi
Japan	7
Australia	0

Final
9 November – Chonburi
North Korea	1
Japan	2
Third place match
9 November – Chonburi
South Korea	9
Australia	1

=== Semi-finals ===
Winners qualified for 2021 FIFA U-20 Women's World Cup.

6 November 2019
16:00

North Korea	3–1	South Korea
Kim Kyong-yong 3', 9'; Pak Il-gyong 53'	Report	Kang Ji-woo 59' (pen.)

Chonburi Stadium, Chonburi
Attendance: 100
Referee: Abirami Naidu (Singapore)

6 November 2019
20:00

Japan	7–0	Australia
Kanno 21' (pen.); Osawa 23', 48'; Yamamoto 50'; Itō 52'; Hirosawa 80', 86'	Report

Chonburi Stadium, Chonburi
Attendance: 120
Referee: Ranjita Devi Tekcham (India)

=== Third place match ===
Winner qualified for 2021 FIFA U-20 Women's World Cup.

9 November 2019
16:00

South Korea	9–1	Australia
Noh Jin-young 14'; Choo Hyo-joo 24', 88'; Kang Ji-woo 36', 75', 84', 90' (pen.); Hyun Seul-gi 39'; Cho Mi-jin 90+2'	Report	M. Fowler 81'

Chonburi Stadium, Chonburi
Attendance: 150
Referee: Pansa Chaisanit (Thailand)

=== Final ===
9 November 2019
20:00

North Korea	1–2	Japan
Kim Yun-ok 82' (pen.)	Report	Yamamoto 47'; Takahashi 72'

Chonburi Stadium, Chonburi
Attendance: 200
Referee: Edita Mirabidova (Uzbekistan)

== Winners ==
Winner 2019 AFC U-19 Women's Championship

Japan
Sixth title

== Awards ==
The following awards were given at the conclusion of the tournament:

Top Goalscorer	Most Valuable Player	Fair Play award
(South Korea) Kang Ji-woo	(Japan) Oto Kanno	Japan

== Qualified teams for FIFA U-20 Women's World Cup ==
Japan, North Korea, and South Korea would have qualified for the 2021 FIFA U-20 Women's World Cup before the tournament was cancelled.

All three teams originally qualified for the 2022 FIFA U-20 Women's World Cup. On 16 March 2022, the AFC announced that Australia would replace North Korea as the AFC’s representatives at the FIFA U-20 Women's World Cup.

Team	Qualified on	Previous appearances in FIFA U-20 Women's World Cup^{1}
Japan	6 November 2019	6 (2002, 2008, 2010, 2012, 2016, **2018**)
South Korea	9 November 2019	5 (2004, 2010, 2012, 2014, 2016)
Australia	16 March 2022	3 (2002, 2004, 2006)

^{1} Bold indicates champions for that year. Italic indicates hosts for that year.

== Goalscorers ==
There were 64 goals scored in 16 matches, for an average of 4 goals per match.

7 goals

- (South Korea) Kang Ji-woo

5 goals

- (Japan) Yuzuki Yamamoto

4 goals

- (Australia) Mary Fowler
- (North Korea) Kim Kyong-yong

3 goals

- (Japan) Maho Hirosawa
- (Japan) Haruka Osawa

2 goals

- (China) Han Xuan
- (China) Yang Qian
- (Japan) Sara Itō
- (Japan) Oto Kanno
- (North Korea) Kim Yun-ok
- (North Korea) Pak Il-gyong
- (North Korea) Yun Ji-hwa
- (South Korea) Choo Hyo-joo

1 goal

- (Australia) Kyra Cooney-Cross
- (Australia) Courtney Nevin
- (China) Sun Pingwei
- (China) Wang Linlin
- (China) Yao Mengjia
- (Japan) Momo Kato
- (Japan) Misaki Morita
- (Japan) Hana Takahashi
- (Myanmar) San Thaw Thaw
- (North Korea) Kim Hyang
- (North Korea) Ri Chong-gyong
- (North Korea) Ri Kum-hyang
- (North Korea) Ri Su-gyong
- (North Korea) Ryu Sol-song
- (South Korea) Cho Mi-jin
- (South Korea) Hyun Seul-gi
- (South Korea) Lee Jeong-min
- (South Korea) Noh Jin-young
- (Thailand) Pattaranan Aupachai
- (Thailand) Nutwadee Pram-nak
- (Vietnam) Ngân Thị Vạn Sự
- (Vietnam) Nguyễn Thị Tuyết Ngân
