= 2002 AFC U-19 Women's Championship =

Tournament details
- Host country: India
- Dates: 19–28 April
- Teams: 12 (from 1 confederation)
- Venue(s): 2 (in 2 host cities)

Final positions
- Champions: Japan (1st title)
- Runners-up: Chinese Taipei
- Third place: China
- Fourth place: North Korea

Tournament statistics
- Matches played: 22
- Goals scored: 161 (7.32 per match)
- Best player(s): (Chinese Taipei) Tseng Shu-o

The 2002 AFC U-19 Women's Championship was the first edition of the AFC U-19 Women's Championship. It was held from 19 to 28 April 2002 in Goa, India. Two finalists are qualified 2002 FIFA U-19 Women's World Championship.

== Group stage ==
=== Group A ===
Pos	Team	Pld	W	D	L	GF	GA	GD	Pts	Qualification
1	Japan	3	3	0	0	31	0	+31	9	Knockout stage
2	South Korea	3	2	0	1	17	7	+10	6	
3	India (H)	3	1	0	2	6	13	−7	3	
4	Guam	3	0	0	3	0	34	−34	0	

Updated to match(es) played on 18 October 2017. Source:
Rules for classification: Group stage tiebreakers
(H) Hosts
19 April 2002

South Korea	4–0	India

Fatorda Stadium, Margao

19 April 2002

Japan	15–0	Guam

Fatorda Stadium, Margao

21 April 2002

Japan	7–0	South Korea

Fatorda Stadium, Margao

21 April 2002

Guam	0–6	India

Fatorda Stadium, Margao

23 April 2002

Japan	9–0	India

Fatorda Stadium, Margao

23 April 2002

Guam	0–13	South Korea

Fatorda Stadium, Margao

=== Group B ===
Pos	Team	Pld	W	D	L	GF	GA	GD	Pts	Qualification
1	Chinese Taipei	3	2	1	0	33	0	+33	7	Knockout stage
2	China	3	2	1	0	32	0	+32	7	Knockout stage
3	Singapore	3	1	0	2	2	34	−32	3	
4	Hong Kong	3	0	0	3	1	34	−33	0	

Updated to match(es) played on 18 October 2017. Source:
Rules for classification: Group stage tiebreakers
20 April 2002

China	15–0	Singapore
Bi Yan 2', ?', ?', ?', 20', 44'; Han Duan 35', 42', 70'; Zhang Ying ?', ?'; Zhong Jinyu ?'; Wang Dandan ?'; Zhang Na ?'; Wu Miaomiao ?'

Fatorda Stadium, Margao

20 April 2002

Chinese Taipei	15–0	Hong Kong
Lu Yen-ling ?', ?', ?', ?'; Tseng Shu-o ?', ?', ?'; Yu Hsing-chang ?', ?', ?'; Chang Hui-chih ?', ?'; Yu Wen ?'; Lan Mei-fen ?'; Tsai Li-chen ?'

Fatorda Stadium, Margao

22 April 2002

China	0–0	Chinese Taipei

Fatorda Stadium, Margao

22 April 2002

Singapore	2–1	Hong Kong
Nursayaima 53'; Huraizah 67'		Fung Kam Mui 28'

Fatorda Stadium, Margao

24 April 2002

China	17–0	Hong Kong
Li Dongling 1', 45'; Li Nan 22', 54', 73', 83', 85'; Wu Miaomiao 29', 82'; Zhang Ying 40'; Lu Yan 51'; Wang Dandan 56', 57', 71'; Hou Lijia 70', 87'; Ge yang 76'

Fatorda Stadium, Margao

24 April 2002

Singapore	0–18	Chinese Taipei
		Tsai Li-chen ?', ?', ?', ?'; Tseng Shu-o ?', ?', ?', ?'; Cheng Yu-hsing ?', ?', ?'; Chang Hu-chih ?', ?'; Yu Wen ?'; Lan Mei-fen ?'; Wu Shin-jun ?'; Huang Yu-chen ?'; Lu Yen-ling ?'

Fatorda Stadium, Margao

=== Group C ===
Pos	Team	Pld	W	D	L	GF	GA	GD	Pts	Qualification
1	North Korea	3	3	0	0	18	0	+18	9	Knockout stage
2	Myanmar	3	2	0	1	7	8	−1	6	
3	Thailand	3	1	0	2	2	12	−10	3	
4	Uzbekistan	3	0	0	3	1	8	−7	0	

Updated to match(es) played on 18 October 2017. Source:
Rules for classification: Group stage tiebreakers
20 April 2002

North Korea	10–0	Thailand

Tilak Maidan, Vasco da Gama

20 April 2002

Uzbekistan	1–5	Myanmar

Tilak Maidan, Vasco da Gama

22 April 2002

North Korea	1–0	Uzbekistan

Tilak Maidan, Vasco da Gama

22 April 2002

Thailand	0–2	Myanmar

Tilak Maidan, Vasco da Gama

24 April 2002

North Korea	7–0	Myanmar

Tilak Maidan, Vasco da Gama

24 April 2002

Thailand	2–0	Uzbekistan

Tilak Maidan, Vasco da Gama

=== Ranking of second-placed teams ===
Grp	Team	Pld	W	D	L	GF	GA	GD	Pts
B	China	3	2	1	0	32	0	+32	7
A	South Korea	3	2	0	1	17	7	+10	6
C	Myanmar	3	2	0	1	7	8	−1	6

== Knockout stage ==
=== Semi-finals ===
Winners qualify for 2002 FIFA U-19 Women's World Championship.

26 April 2002

Japan	1–1 (a.e.t.)	China
Kitamoto 5'		Han Duan 90'
Penalties
	3–0

Fatorda Stadium, Margao

26 April 2002

Chinese Taipei	1 – 1 (a.e.t.)	North Korea
Chang Hui-chih 38'		Ri Hwang-ok 31'
Penalties
	4–3

Fatorda Stadium, Margao

=== Third place match ===
28 April 2002

China	4–1	North Korea
Han Duan 4', 90'; Jiang Shuai 15'; Kam Kum-sil 19' (o.g.)		Jong Chol-ok 17'

Fatorda Stadium, Margao

=== Final ===
28 April 2002

Japan	2–1	Chinese Taipei

Fatorda Stadium, Margao

== Winners ==
2002 AFC U-19 Women's Championship

Japan
First title
