= 2015 AFC U-19 Women's Championship =

2015亚足联U19女子锦标赛

Tournament details
- Host country: China
- Dates: 18–29 August
- Teams: 8 (from 1 confederation)
- Venues: 2 (in 1 host city)

Final positions
- Champions: Japan (4th title)
- Runners-up: North Korea
- Third place: South Korea
- Fourth place: China

Tournament statistics
- Matches played: 16
- Goals scored: 73 (4.56 per match)
- Attendance: 4,675 (292 per match)
- Top scorer: (North Korea) Ri Un-sim (6 goals)
- Best player: (Japan) Rikako Kobayashi
- Fair play award: Japan

The 2015 AFC U-19 Women's Championship was the 8th edition of the AFC U-19 Women's Championship, the biennial international youth football championship organised by the Asian Football Confederation (AFC) for the women's under-19 national teams of Asia. The tournament was held in China between 18–29 August 2015. A total of eight teams played in the tournament.

Same as previous editions, the tournament acted as the AFC qualifiers for the FIFA U-20 Women's World Cup. The top three teams of the tournament qualified for the 2016 FIFA U-20 Women's World Cup in Papua New Guinea as the AFC representatives.

Japan won their fourth title with a final victory over North Korea on penalties. Both finalists and third-placed South Korea qualified for the World Cup.

== Qualification ==
The draw for the qualifiers was held on 17 June 2014. Four teams qualified directly for the final tournament by their 2013 performance, while the other entrants competed in the qualifying stage for the remaining four spots.

=== Qualified teams ===
The following eight teams qualified for the final tournament.

Team	Qualified as	Appearance	Previous best performance
South Korea	2013 AFC U-19 Women's Championship champions	8th	Champions (2004, 2013)
North Korea	2013 AFC U-19 Women's Championship runners-up	8th	Champions (2007)
China	2013 AFC U-19 Women's Championship third place / Hosts	8th	Champions (2006)
Japan	2013 AFC U-19 Women's Championship fourth place	8th	Champions (2002, 2009, 2011)
Uzbekistan	Qualifying Group A winners	3rd	Group stage (2002, 2004)
Iran	Qualifying Group B winners	1st	Debut
Australia	Qualifying Group C winners	6th	Third place (2006)
Thailand	Qualifying Group D winners	5th	Fourth place (2004)

== Venues ==
Nanjing hosted the tournament, with two venues: Jiangning Sports Center and Jiangsu Training Base Stadium.

Nanjing
Jiangning Sports Center	Jiangsu Training Base Stadium
Capacity: 30,000	Capacity: 3,000
2015 AFC U-19 Women's Championship is located in China

== Draw ==
The draw for the final tournament was held on 13 May 2015 at the AFC House in Kuala Lumpur. The eight teams were drawn into two groups of four teams. The teams were seeded according to their performance in the previous edition in 2013.

Pot 1	Pot 2	Pot 3	Pot 4
China (hosts); South Korea	Japan; North Korea	Australia; Thailand	Iran; Uzbekistan

== Squads ==
Players born between 1 January 1996 and 31 December 2000 were eligible to compete in the tournament. Each team can register a maximum of 23 players (minimum three of whom must be goalkeepers).

== Group stage ==
The top two teams of each group advanced to the semi-finals.

Tiebreakers

The teams were ranked according to points (3 points for a win, 1 point for a draw, 0 points for a loss). If tied on points, tiebreakers were applied in the following order:

1. Greater number of points obtained in the group matches between the teams concerned;
2. Goal difference resulting from the group matches between the teams concerned;
3. Greater number of goals scored in the group matches between the teams concerned;
4. Goal difference in all the group matches;
5. Greater number of goals scored in all the group matches;
6. Penalty shoot-out if only two teams are involved and they are both on the field of play;
7. Fewer score calculated according to the number of yellow and red cards received in the group matches (1 point for a single yellow card, 3 points for a red card as a consequence of two yellow cards, 3 points for a direct red card, 4 points for a yellow card followed by a direct red card);
8. Drawing of lots.

All times were local, CST (UTC+8).

=== Group A ===
Pos	Team	Pld	W	D	L	GF	GA	GD	Pts	Qualification
1	Japan	3	3	0	0	11	2	+9	9	Knockout stage
2	China (H)	3	2	0	1	13	4	+9	6	Knockout stage
3	Australia	3	1	0	2	3	4	−1	3	
4	Uzbekistan	3	0	0	3	0	17	−17	0	

Source: AFC
Rules for classification: Group stage tiebreakers
(H) Hosts
18 August 2015
16:00

Japan	2–0	Australia
Kobayashi 10', 28'	Report

Jiangsu Training Base Stadium, Nanjing
Attendance: 200
Referee: Ri Hyang-ok (North Korea)
18 August 2015
19:00

China	9–0	Uzbekistan
Shi Tianlun 14' (pen.); Xiao Yuyi 20', 41', 58'; Yan Jinjin 31', 32', 51'; Zhang Zhu 66'; Tojiddinova 79' (o.g.)	Report

Jiangning Sports Center, Nanjing
Attendance: 500
Referee: Mai Hoàng Trang (Vietnam)

20 August 2015
16:00

Uzbekistan	0–6	Japan
	Report	Sonoda 5', 77'; Seike 25', 35', 47'; Hasegawa 36'

Jiangsu Training Base Stadium, Nanjing
Attendance: 100
Referee: Maria Rebello (India)
20 August 2015
19:00

Australia	1–2	China
Harrison 67'	Report	Qin Manman 38'; Liu Yan 55'

Jiangning Sports Center, Nanjing
Attendance: 450
Referee: Rita Gani (Malaysia)

22 August 2015
16:00

China	2–3	Japan
Shi Tianlun 71' (pen.); Pan Jiahui 84'	Report	Kobayashi 22'; Nishida 64'; Kitagawa 75'

Jiangning Sports Center, Nanjing
Attendance: 600
Referee: Ri Hyang-ok (North Korea)
22 August 2015
16:00

Australia	2–0	Uzbekistan
Kirby 36'; O'Brien 90+3'	Report

Jiangsu Training Base Stadium, Nanjing
Attendance: 100
Referee: Maria Rebello (India)

=== Group B ===
Pos	Team	Pld	W	D	L	GF	GA	GD	Pts	Qualification
1	North Korea	3	3	0	0	15	0	+15	9	Knockout stage
2	South Korea	3	2	0	1	16	1	+15	6	Knockout stage
3	Thailand	3	1	0	2	7	9	−2	3	
4	Iran	3	0	0	3	1	29	−28	0	

Source: AFC
Rules for classification: Group stage tiebreakers
19 August 2015
16:00

South Korea	13–0	Iran
Hwang Hye-soo 11', 24'; Choi Hee-jeong 15', 36'; Namgung Ye-ji 37', 59'; Son Hwa-yeon 52', 78'; Wie Jae-eun 60', 72', 81'; Park Ye-eun 65'; Song Ji-yoon 90'	Report

Jiangsu Training Base Stadium, Nanjing
Attendance: 150
Referee: Sachiko Yamagishi (Japan)
19 August 2015
19:00

North Korea	5–0	Thailand
Jon So-yon 38' (pen.); Ri Kyong-hyang 47'; Ri Un-sim 63', 66', 88'	Report

Jiangning Sports Center, Nanjing
Attendance: 400
Referee: Qin Liang (China)

21 August 2015
16:00

Thailand	0–3	South Korea
	Report	Jang Chang 52', 71'; Namgung Ye-ji 75' (pen.)

Jiangsu Training Base Stadium, Nanjing
Attendance: 150
Referee: Kate Jacewicz (Australia)
21 August 2015
19:00

Iran	0–9	North Korea
	Report	Ri Un-sim 27', 63'; Jon So-yon 33'; Wi Jong-sim 36'; Kim Phyong-hwa 39'; Ri Kyong-hyang 48'; Ri Hui-jong 86'; Kim So-hyang 88'; Choe Un-hwa 90+4'

Jiangning Sports Center, Nanjing
Attendance: 300
Referee: Mai Hoàng Trang (Vietnam)

23 August 2015
16:00

South Korea	0–1	North Korea
	Report	Ri Hyang-sim 62'

Jiangning Sports Center, Nanjing
Attendance: 100
Referee: Rita Gani (Malaysia)
23 August 2015
16:00

Thailand	7–1	Iran
Saowalak 3', 11', 53', 68'; Jenjira 81', 84', 89'	Report	Zohrabi Nia 59'

Jiangsu Training Base Stadium, Nanjing
Attendance: 75
Referee: Qin Liang (China)

== Knockout stage ==
In the knockout stage, extra time and penalty shoot-out were used to decide the winner if necessary.

=== Bracket ===
Semi-finals
26 August – Nanjing
Japan	1
South Korea	0
26 August – Nanjing
North Korea	2
China	0

Final
29 August – Nanjing
Japan (p)	0 (4)
North Korea	0 (2)
Third place
29 August – Nanjing
South Korea	4
China	0

=== Semi-finals ===
Winners qualified for 2016 FIFA U-20 Women's World Cup.

26 August 2015
16:30

Japan	1–0	South Korea
Kobayashi 82'	Report

Jiangning Sports Center, Nanjing
Attendance: 200
Referee: Kate Jacewicz (Australia)

26 August 2015
20:00

North Korea	2–0	China
Ri Un-sim 29'; Ri Kyong-hyang 61'	Report

Jiangning Sports Center, Nanjing
Attendance: 500
Referee: Rita Gani (Malaysia)

=== Third place match ===
Winner qualified for 2016 FIFA U-20 Women's World Cup.

29 August 2015
16:30

South Korea	4–0	China
Wang Ying 50' (o.g.); Son Hwa-yeon 59', 67'; Jang Chang 69'	Report

Jiangning Sports Center, Nanjing
Attendance: 350
Referee: Sachiko Yamagishi (Japan)

=== Final ===
29 August 2015
20:00

Japan	0–0 (a.e.t.)	North Korea
	Report
Penalties
Nishida (penalty scored); Kobayashi (penalty scored); Kitagawa (penalty scored); Miura (penalty scored)	4–2	(penalty scored) Jon So-yon; (penalty scored) Ri Un-sim; (penalty missed) Jo Ryon-hwa; (penalty missed) Wi Jong-sim

Jiangning Sports Center, Nanjing
Attendance: 500
Referee: Qin Liang (China)

== Winners ==
2015 AFC U-19 Women's Championship winners

Japan
Fourth title

== Qualified teams for FIFA U-20 Women's World Cup ==
The following three teams from AFC qualified for the FIFA U-20 Women's World Cup.

Team	Qualified on	Previous appearances in tournament^{1}
Japan	26 August 2015	4 (2002, 2008, 2010, 2012)
North Korea	26 August 2015	5 (**2006**, 2008, 2010, 2012, 2014)
South Korea	29 August 2015	4 (2004, 2010, 2012, 2014)

^{1} Bold indicates champion for that year. Italic indicates host for that year.

== Awards ==
The following awards were given at the conclusion of the tournament.

Most Valuable Player	Top Scorer	Fair Play Award
(Japan) Rikako Kobayashi	(North Korea) Ri Un-sim	Japan

== Goalscorers ==
6 goals

- (North Korea) Ri Un-sim

4 goals

- (Japan) Rikako Kobayashi
- (South Korea) Son Hwa-yeon
- (Thailand) Saowalak Pengngam

3 goals

- (China) Xiao Yuyi
- (China) Yan Jinjin
- (Japan) Kiko Seike
- (North Korea) Ri Kyong-hyang
- (South Korea) Namgung Ye-ji
- (South Korea) Jang Chang
- (South Korea) Wie Jae-eun
- (Thailand) Jenjira Bubpha

2 goals

- (China) Shi Tianlun
- (Japan) Mizuki Sonoda
- (North Korea) Jon So-yon
- (South Korea) Choi Hee-jeong
- (South Korea) Hwang Hye-soo

1 goal

- (Australia) Amy Harrison
- (Australia) Ayesha Kirby
- (Australia) Chloe O'Brien
- (China) Liu Yan
- (China) Pan Jiahui
- (China) Qin Manman
- (China) Zhang Zhu
- (Iran) Sara Zohrabi
- (Japan) Yui Hasegawa
- (Japan) Hikaru Kitagawa
- (Japan) Meika Nishida
- (North Korea) Choe Un-hwa
- (North Korea) Kim Phyong-hwa
- (North Korea) Kim So-hyang
- (North Korea) Ri Hui-jong
- (North Korea) Ri Hyang-sim
- (North Korea) Wi Jong-sim
- (South Korea) Park Ye-eun
- (South Korea) Song Ji-yoon

Own goal

- (China) Wang Ying (playing against South Korea)
- (Uzbekistan) Shokhida Tojiddinova (playing against China PR)

Source: the-afc.com
