= 2004 AFC U-19 Women's Championship =

AFC U-19 Women's Championship

Tournament details
- Host country: China
- Dates: 25 May – 6 June
- Teams: 15 (from 1 confederation)
- Venues: 2 (in 2 host cities)

Final positions
- Champions: South Korea (1st title)
- Runners-up: China
- Third place: North Korea
- Fourth place: Thailand

Tournament statistics
- Matches played: 29
- Goals scored: 185 (6.38 per match)

The 2004 AFC U-19 Women's Championship was the second edition of the AFC U-19 Women's Championship. It was held from 25 May to 6 June 2004 in China.

== Venues ==
Suzhou	Wuxi
Suzhou Sports Center	Wuxi Sports Center
Capacity: 35,000	Capacity: 28,000
2004 AFC U-19 Women's Championship is located in China

== Group stage ==
=== Group A ===
Team	Pld	W	D	L	GF	GA	GD	Pts
Japan	2	2	0	0	28	0	+28	6
Vietnam	2	1	0	1	17	4	+13	3
Malaysia	2	0	0	2	0	41	−41	0

- Group A originally also included Myanmar, but they withdrew before the tournament began.

Vietnam	17–0	Malaysia

Suzhou Sports Center, Suzhou

Vietnam	0–4	Japan

Suzhou Sports Center, Suzhou

Japan	24–0	Malaysia

Suzhou Sports Center, Suzhou

=== Group B ===
Team	Pld	W	D	L	GF	GA	GD	Pts
Chinese Taipei	3	3	0	0	17	0	+17	9
India	3	2	0	1	3	4	−1	6
Hong Kong	3	1	0	2	3	11	−8	3
Singapore	3	0	0	3	0	8	−8	0

Chinese Taipei	5–0	Singapore

Wuxi Sports Center, Wuxi

India	2–1	Hong Kong

Wuxi Sports Center, Wuxi

Singapore	0–1	India

Wuxi Sports Center, Wuxi

Hong Kong	0–9	Chinese Taipei

Wuxi Sports Center, Wuxi

Chinese Taipei	3–0	India

Wuxi Sports Center, Wuxi

Singapore	0–2	Hong Kong

Wuxi Sports Center, Wuxi

=== Group C ===
Team	Pld	W	D	L	GF	GA	GD	Pts
South Korea	3	3	0	0	13	2	+11	9
China	3	2	0	1	15	2	+13	6
Philippines	3	1	0	2	4	8	−4	3
Guam	3	0	0	3	0	20	−20	0

South Korea	2–1	China

Suzhou Sports Center, Suzhou

Philippines	3–0	Guam

Suzhou Sports Center, Suzhou

South Korea	9–0	Guam

Suzhou Sports Center, Suzhou

Philippines	0–6	China

Suzhou Sports Center, Suzhou

China	8–0	Guam

Suzhou Sports Center, Suzhou

South Korea	2–1	Philippines

Suzhou Sports Center, Suzhou

=== Group D ===
Team	Pld	W	D	L	GF	GA	GD	Pts
North Korea	3	3	0	0	36	0	+36	9
Thailand	3	2	0	1	11	5	+6	6
Uzbekistan	3	1	0	2	4	19	−15	3
Nepal	3	0	0	3	2	29	−27	0

North Korea	19–0	Nepal

Wuxi Sports Center, Wuxi

Thailand	5–0	Uzbekistan

Wuxi Sports Center, Wuxi

Nepal	1–6	Thailand

Wuxi Sports Center, Wuxi

Uzbekistan	0–13	North Korea

Wuxi Sports Center, Wuxi

North Korea	4–0	Thailand

Wuxi Sports Center, Wuxi

Uzbekistan	4–1	Nepal

Wuxi Sports Center, Wuxi

== Knockout stage ==
=== Quarter-finals ===
Japan	0–1	China

Suzhou Sports Center, Suzhou

Chinese Taipei	0–3	Thailand

Wuxi Sports Center, Wuxi

Vietnam	1–5	South Korea

Suzhou Sports Center, Suzhou

India	0–10	North Korea

Wuxi Sports Center, Wuxi

=== Semi-finals ===
Winners qualify for 2004 FIFA U-19 Women's World Championship.

China	1–1	North Korea
Penalties
	6–5

Suzhou Sports Center, Suzhou

Thailand	0–3	South Korea

Wuxi Sports Center, Wuxi

=== Third place match ===
North Korea	4–0	Thailand

Suzhou Sports Center, Suzhou

=== Final ===
China	0–3	South Korea

Suzhou Sports Center, Suzhou

== Winners ==
2004 AFC U-19 Women's Championship

South Korea
First title
