= 2026 WAFF U-20 Girls Championship =

Women's national youth association football tournament

بطولة اتحاد غرب آسيا السادسة للشابات الأردن ٢٠٢٦

Tournament details
- Host country: Jordan
- City: Aqaba
- Dates: 26 November – 4 December
- Teams: 6 (from 1 sub-confederation)
- Venue: 1 (in 1 host city)

The 2026 WAFF U-20 Girls Championship (Arabic: بطولة اتحاد غرب آسيا السادسة للشابات) will be the 6th edition of the WAFF Youth Girls Championship, the international women's football youth championship of Western Asia organized by the West Asian Football Federation (WAFF) for the women's under-20 national teams. It will held in Aqaba, Jordan, from 26 November to 2 December 2026.

Palestine enter the tournament as the defending champions, having secured their first title in the last edition.

== Participation ==
=== Participating teams ===
Six of the 12 WAFF member associations registered teams for the competition, two of which had participated in the 2025 edition.

Country	App.	Previous best performance
Iraq	2nd	Group stage (2019)
Jordan	6th	Champions (2018, 2024)
Lebanon	5th	Champions (2019, 2022)
Palestine	5th	Champions (2025)
Saudi Arabia	2nd	Fourth place (2024)
United Arab Emirates	2nd	Fifth place (2019)

=== Draw ===
The tournament draw to determine the positions of the participating teams was held on 21 October 2026.

The draw resulted in the following positions:

Pos	Team
A1	Jordan
A2	Iraq
A3	United Arab Emirates

Pos	Team
B1	Palestine
B2	Saudi Arabia
B3	Lebanon

=== Squads ===
Players born between 1 January 2007 and 31 December 2011 were eligible to compete in the tournament.

== Group stage ==
All times are local, AST (UTC+3).

=== Group A ===
Pos	Team	Pld	W	D	L	GF	GA	GD	Pts	Qualification
1	Jordan	0	0	0	0	0	0	0	0	Semi-final
2	Iraq	0	0	0	0	0	0	0	0	Semi-final
3	United Arab Emirates	0	0	0	0	0	0	0	0	

Updated to match(es) played on 21 October 2026. Source: WAFF
Rules for classification: 1) Points; 2) head-to-head matches; 3) Goal difference; 4) Number of goals scored.
26 November 2026
20:00

Jordan	v	United Arab Emirates

Aqaba Stadium, Aqaba

28 November 2026
17:00

Iraq	v	United Arab Emirates

Aqaba Stadium, Aqaba

30 November 2026
20:00

Jordan	v	Iraq

Aqaba Stadium, Aqaba

=== Group B ===
Pos	Team	Pld	W	D	L	GF	GA	GD	Pts	Qualification
1	Palestine	0	0	0	0	0	0	0	0	Semi-final
2	Saudi Arabia	0	0	0	0	0	0	0	0	Semi-final
3	Lebanon	0	0	0	0	0	0	0	0	

Updated to match(es) played on 21 October 2026. Source: WAFF
Rules for classification: 1) Points; 2) head-to-head matches; 3) Goal difference; 4) Number of goals scored.
26 November 2026
17:00

Palestine	v	Lebanon

Aqaba Stadium, Aqaba

28 November 2026
20:00

Saudi Arabia	v	Lebanon

Aqaba Stadium, Aqaba

30 November 2026
20:00

Palestine	v	Saudi Arabia

Aqaba Stadium, Aqaba

== Knockout stage ==
=== Semi-finals ===
2 December 2026
17:00

Winner of Group A	Match 7	Runner-up of Group B

Aqaba Stadium, Aqaba

2 December 2026
20:00

Winner of Group B	Match 8	Runner-up of Group A

Aqaba Stadium, Aqaba

=== Third-place ===
4 December 2026
17:00

Loser of Match 7	v	Loser of Match 8

Aqaba Stadium, Aqaba

=== Final ===
4 December 2026
20:00

Winner of Match 7	v	Winner of Match 8

Aqaba Stadium, Aqaba
