= 2019 AFC U-19 Women's Championship qualification =

Tournament details
- Host countries: First round: Lebanon (Group A); Thailand (Group B); Kyrgyzstan (Group C); Tajikistan (Group D); Vietnam (Group E); Myanmar (Group F); Second round: Myanmar (Group A); Vietnam (Group B)
- Dates: First round: 20–28 October 2018; Second round: 26–30 April 2019
- Teams: 27 (from 1 confederation)

Tournament statistics
- Matches played: 49
- Goals scored: 300 (6.12 per match)
- Attendance: 17,049 (348 per match)
- Top scorer(s): (Uzbekistan) Shahnoza Kurbonova (Vietnam) Nguyễn Thị Tuyết Ngân (10 goals each)

The 2019 AFC U-19 Women's Championship qualification is a women's under-19 football competition which decides the participating teams of the 2019 AFC U-19 Women's Championship.

A total of eight teams qualify to play in the final tournament held in Thailand, four of which are decided by qualification.

== Teams ==
Of the 47 AFC member associations, a total of 30 teams entered the competition, with Japan, North Korea, and China PR, automatically qualified for the final tournament by their position as the top three teams of the 2017 AFC U-19 Women's Championship and thus not participating in qualification. The final tournament hosts Thailand, despite having automatically qualified for the final tournament, entered to participate in qualification. As a result, a total of 27 teams entered qualification. Due to the increased number of teams, two qualification rounds were scheduled for the first time.

The draw for the first round of the qualifiers was held on 30 May 2018, 16:00 MYT (UTC+8), at the AFC House in Kuala Lumpur, Malaysia. For the first round, the 27 teams were drawn into six groups: three groups of five teams and three groups of four teams. The teams were seeded according to their performance in the 2017 AFC U-19 Women's Championship final tournament and qualification. The following restrictions were also applied:

- The four teams which indicated their intention to serve as qualification group hosts prior to the draw were drawn into separate groups.

Qualified Teams: Top 3 of the 2017 edition
1. **Japan**
2. **North Korea**
3. **China**

Participating in qualification first round
Pot 1	Pot 2	Pot 3	Pot 4 (unranked)
4. Australia; 5. South Korea; 6. Uzbekistan; 7. **Thailand** **(H, Q)**; 8. Vietnam **(H)***; 9. Myanmar **(H)**	10. Chinese Taipei; 11. Jordan; 12. Iran; 13. India; 14. Hong Kong; 15. Kyrgyzstan **(H)**	16. Northern Mariana Islands **(W)**; 17. Tajikistan **(H)**; 18. Palestine **(W)**	Afghanistan **(W)**; Bangladesh; Guam; Laos; Lebanon **(H)***; Malaysia; Maldives; Mongolia; Nepal; Pakistan; Singapore; United Arab Emirates

Notes

- Teams in **bold** automatically qualified for the final tournament.
- Teams in italics advanced to second round.
- (H): Qualification first round group hosts (* Lebanon and Vietnam chosen as group hosts after the draw)
- (Q): Automatically qualified for final tournament as host regardless of first round qualification results, and did not advance to second round
- (W): Withdrew after draw

Did not enter

- Bahrain
- Bhutan
- Brunei
- Cambodia
- Indonesia
- Iraq
- Kuwait
- Macau
- Oman
- Philippines
- Qatar
- Saudi Arabia
- Sri Lanka
- Syria
- Timor-Leste
- Turkmenistan
- Yemen

=== Re-draw ===
Due to the withdrawal of Afghanistan and Northern Mariana Islands after the draw, there were only three teams left in Group E, but still five teams in Groups B and C. As a result, AFC decided to hold a re-draw for the qualification first round to maintain the balance of number of teams across all groups (one group of five teams and five groups of four teams). The re-draw was held at the AFC House on 30 August 2018. In the re-draw, unranked teams from Group B (Pakistan, Nepal, Singapore) and Group C (United Arab Emirates, Guam, Maldives) were placed in a pot and the first ball drawn would be moved to Group E. Singapore was drawn and as a result moved from Group B to Group E.

== Player eligibility ==
Players born between 1 January 2000 and 31 December 2004 are eligible to compete in the tournament.

== Format ==
In each group, teams play each other once at a centralised venue.

- In the first round, the six group winners and the two best runners-up advance to the second round. However, the final tournament hosts Thailand do not advance to the second round. If they win their group, the runner-up of their group advances to the second round, or if they are among the two best runners-up, the third best runner-up advances to the second round.
- In the second round, the two group winners and the two group runners-up qualify for the final tournament to join the four automatically qualified teams.

=== Tiebreakers ===
Teams are ranked according to points (3 points for a win, 1 point for a draw, 0 points for a loss), and if tied on points, the following tiebreaking criteria are applied, in the order given, to determine the rankings (Regulations Article 9.3):

1. Points in head-to-head matches among tied teams;
2. Goal difference in head-to-head matches among tied teams;
3. Goals scored in head-to-head matches among tied teams;
4. If more than two teams are tied, and after applying all head-to-head criteria above, a subset of teams are still tied, all head-to-head criteria above are reapplied exclusively to this subset of teams;
5. Goal difference in all group matches;
6. Goals scored in all group matches;
7. Penalty shoot-out if only two teams are tied and they met in the last round of the group;
8. Disciplinary points (yellow card = 1 point, red card as a result of two yellow cards = 3 points, direct red card = 3 points, yellow card followed by direct red card = 4 points);
9. Drawing of lots.

== First round ==
The first round was played between 20 and 28 October 2018.

=== Group A ===
- All matches were held in Lebanon.
- Times listed are UTC+3 on 24 and 26 October, UTC+2 on 28 October 2018.

Pos	Team	Pld	W	D	L	GF	GA	GD	Pts	Qualification
1	Australia	3	3	0	0	23	0	+23	9	Second round
2	Lebanon (H)	3	2	0	1	10	2	+8	6	Second round
3	Mongolia	3	1	0	2	1	22	−21	3	
4	Hong Kong	3	0	0	3	0	10	−10	0	
5	Afghanistan	0	0	0	0	0	0	0	0	Withdrew

Source: AFC
Rules for classification: Qualification tiebreakers
(H) Hosts
24 October 2018
11:30

Australia	18–0	Mongolia
Ibini-Isei 6', 11', 70', 77', 89'; Temuulen 19' (o.g.); Cooney-Cross 28', 32', 59'; Sayer 38'; Lowe 50'; Colvill 62', 64', 72', 75'; Ray 69', 86'; Rasamee 85'	Report

Jounieh Municipal Stadium, Jounieh
Attendance: 40
Referee: Thein Thein Aye (Myanmar)
24 October 2018
15:30

Hong Kong	0–6	Lebanon
	Report	Bou Rada 3', 35', 42', 71'; Awad 64'; Iskandar 88'

Jounieh Municipal Stadium, Jounieh
Attendance: 170
Referee: Anna Sidorova (Uzbekistan)

26 October 2018
11:30

Mongolia	1–0	Hong Kong
Enkhmargad 11'	Report

Jounieh Municipal Stadium, Jounieh
Attendance: 10
Referee: Ranjita Devi Tekcham (India)
26 October 2018
15:30

Lebanon	0–2	Australia
	Report	Cooney-Cross 24'; Sayer 47'

Jounieh Municipal Stadium, Jounieh
Attendance: 215
Referee: Anna Sidorova (Uzbekistan)

28 October 2018
11:30

Australia	3–0	Hong Kong
Sayer 14' (pen.), 40'; Colvill 62'	Report

Jounieh Municipal Stadium, Jounieh
Attendance: 31
Referee: Cha Min-ji (South Korea)
28 October 2018
15:30

Lebanon	4–0	Mongolia
Awad 34', 61'; Ghanime 55'; Tamim 89'	Report

Jounieh Municipal Stadium, Jounieh
Attendance: 423
Referee: Thein Thein Aye (Myanmar)

=== Group B ===
- All matches were held in Thailand.
- Times listed are UTC+7.

Pos	Team	Pld	W	D	L	GF	GA	GD	Pts	Qualification
1	Thailand (Note: Thailand, as final tournament hosts, automatically qualified regardless of first round qualification results, and did not advance to the second round.) (H)	3	2	0	1	21	1	+20	6 (Note: Head-to-head results: Thailand 3–0 Nepal, Nepal 2–0 India, Thailand 0–1 India. Head-to-head standings: Thailand: 3 pts, +2 GD, 3 GF; Nepal: 3 pts, −1 GD, 2 GF; India: 3 pts, −1 GD, 1 GF)	
2	Nepal	3	2	0	1	11	3	+8	6	Second round
3	India	3	2	0	1	19	2	+17	6	
4	Pakistan	3	0	0	3	0	45	−45	0	
5	Singapore	0	0	0	0	0	0	0	0	Re-drew to Group E

Source: AFC
Rules for classification: Qualification tiebreakers
(H) Hosts
Notes:
24 October 2018
16:00

India	18–0	Pakistan
Kalyan 2', 25', 47'; Roy 9', 15', 46'; Em. Fayyaz 26' (o.g.); D. Devi 28'; A. Devi 31', 59'; P. Devi 45+1'; Tudu 45+2' (pen.); Rani 52', 54', 75', 90', 90+2'; Guguloth 77'	Report

Chonburi Stadium, Chonburi
Attendance: 70
Referee: Rebecca Durcau (Australia)
24 October 2018
19:30

Thailand	3–0	Nepal
Pattaranan 9'; Tipkritta 17' (pen.); Siriwipa 90+1'	Report

Chonburi Stadium, Chonburi
Attendance: 214
Referee: Oh Hyeon-jeong (South Korea)

26 October 2018
16:00

Nepal	2–0	India
Poudel 59', 88'	Report

Chonburi Stadium, Chonburi
Attendance: 50
Referee: Yu Hong (China)
26 October 2018
19:30

Pakistan	0–18	Thailand
	Report	Siriwipa 7', 59', 76'; Em. Fayyaz 19' (o.g.); Anupha 24', 30', 53', 62', 89', 90', 90+1'; Pariyapat 25', 38', 43'; Ploychompoo 36', 42'; Chatchawan 70' (pen.); Phonchita 87'

Chonburi Stadium, Chonburi
Attendance: 245
Referee: Law Bik Chi (Hong Kong)

28 October 2018
16:00

Pakistan	0–9	Nepal
	Report	Yonjan 2'; Lawati 32'; Jimba 37'; Rana 48', 54'; Thokar 57', 74' (pen.), 85' (pen.); Limbu 89'

Chonburi Stadium, Chonburi
Attendance: 50
Referee: Oh Hyeon-jeong (South Korea)
28 October 2018
19:30

Thailand	0–1	India
	Report	Hauhnar 36'

Chonburi Stadium, Chonburi
Attendance: 252
Referee: Rebecca Durcau (Australia)

=== Group C ===
- All matches were held in Kyrgyzstan.
- Times listed are UTC+6.

Pos	Team	Pld	W	D	L	GF	GA	GD	Pts	Qualification
1	Uzbekistan	4	4	0	0	34	2	+32	12	Second round
2	Kyrgyzstan (H)	4	3	0	1	18	6	+12	9	
3	United Arab Emirates	4	2	0	2	22	5	+17	6	
4	Guam	4	1	0	3	14	15	−1	3	
5	Maldives	4	0	0	4	0	60	−60	0	

Source: AFC
Rules for classification: Qualification tiebreakers
(H) Hosts
20 October 2018
12:00

Maldives	0–12	Guam
	Report	Cruz 6', 84', 87'; Bass 13'; Phillips 42', 46', 51'; Sb. Kenney 48'; Whalen 60'; Ibrahim 63' (o.g.); Guzman 90+2'; Vasquez 90+3'

Dolen Omurzakov Stadium, Bishkek
Attendance: 50
Referee: Pansa Chaisanit (Thailand)
20 October 2018
16:00

United Arab Emirates	1–2	Kyrgyzstan
Al-Zarkan 59'	Report	Dalinger 67'; Yrysbek Kyzy 74'

Dolen Omurzakov Stadium, Bishkek
Attendance: 200
Referee: Abirami Naidu (Singapore)

22 October 2018
12:00

Guam	0–8	Uzbekistan
	Report	Allamurodova 3', 23'; Kurbonova 19', 45+2', 56'; Rashidova 62'; Zaynitdinova 90+1'; Tasheva 90+3'

Dolen Omurzakov Stadium, Bishkek
Attendance: 30
Referee: Asaka Matsushita (Japan)
22 October 2018
16:00

Maldives	0–19	United Arab Emirates
	Report	Al-Hammadi 4', 60', 87'; S. Rashid 12', 54', 61', 73'; Al-Zarkan 17' (pen.), 37', 74'; Al-Mesmari 21', 34'; Khaled 27'; Al-Mheiri 39', 43', 65', 76'; Al-Mazrouei 80' (pen.); Saeed 90+3'

Dolen Omurzakov Stadium, Bishkek
Attendance: 50
Referee: Casey Reibelt (Australia)

24 October 2018
12:00

Uzbekistan	20–0	Maldives
Ergasheva 2', 23'; Kurbonova 6'; Shodieva 14', 42', 59', 64', 71'; Rashidova 41', 45+6' (pen.); Amanova 45+3', 90+1'; G. Saidova 46', 51'; Giyasova 48', 73'; Erkinova 69'; Tasheva 74'; Mardieva 81'; Nazarkulova 88'	Report

Dolen Omurzakov Stadium, Bishkek
Attendance: 20
Referee: Pak Un-jong (North Korea)
24 October 2018
16:00

Kyrgyzstan	6–2	Guam
Zarodina 7', 11', 19', 50'; Duishobaeva 40'; Yrysbek Kyzy 88'	Report	Phillips 36'; Roberto 45+2' (pen.)

Dolen Omurzakov Stadium, Bishkek
Attendance: 350
Referee: Pansa Chaisanit (Thailand)

26 October 2018
12:00

United Arab Emirates	1–3	Uzbekistan
Khaled 8'	Report	Rashidova 5'; Kurbonova 28', 49'

Dolen Omurzakov Stadium, Bishkek
Attendance: 30
Referee: Pak Un-jong (North Korea)
26 October 2018
16:00

Kyrgyzstan	9–0	Maldives
Ibraimova 13', 90+1'; Alymzhanova 29', 71' (pen.), 74'; Akylbekova 32'; Askar Kyzy 39', 54'; Kanatbek Kyzy 78'	Report

Dolen Omurzakov Stadium, Bishkek
Attendance: 100
Referee: Asaka Matsushita (Japan)

28 October 2018
12:00

Guam	0–1	United Arab Emirates
	Report	Al-Zarkan 80'

Dolen Omurzakov Stadium, Bishkek
Attendance: 30
Referee: Abirami Naidu (Singapore)
28 October 2018
16:00

Uzbekistan	3–1	Kyrgyzstan
Kurbonova 14' (pen.); Rashidova 73'; Smirnova 90+2'	Report	Yrysbek Kyzy 45+1'

Dolen Omurzakov Stadium, Bishkek
Attendance: 400
Referee: Casey Reibelt (Australia)

=== Group D ===
- All matches were held in Tajikistan.
- Times listed are UTC+5.

Pos	Team	Pld	W	D	L	GF	GA	GD	Pts	Qualification
1	South Korea	3	3	0	0	14	0	+14	9	Second round
2	Chinese Taipei	3	2	0	1	9	4	+5	6	
3	Bangladesh	3	1	0	2	5	10	−5	3	
4	Tajikistan (H)	3	0	0	3	1	15	−14	0	

Source: AFC
Rules for classification: Qualification tiebreakers
(H) Hosts
24 October 2018
14:00

South Korea	7–0	Bangladesh
Choo Hyo-joo 8'; Kang Ji-woo 17'; Mun Jin-seo 21'; Jung Min-young 68'; Park Mid-eum 70'; Kim Seo-yeon 80'; Kim Eun-soul 90' (pen.)	Report

Hisor Central Stadium, Hisor
Attendance: 100
Referee: Mahsa Ghorbani (Iran)
24 October 2018
17:00

Chinese Taipei	7–0	Tajikistan
Su Yu-hsuan 27', 34', 54', 90'; Lan Yu-chieh 39', 46', 74'	Report

Hisor Central Stadium, Hisor
Attendance: 100
Referee: Kate Jacewicz (Australia)

26 October 2018
14:00

Bangladesh	0–2	Chinese Taipei
	Report	Lin Hsin-hui 44'; Chen Hsiu-wen 51'

Hisor Central Stadium, Hisor
Attendance: 100
Referee: Doumouh Al-Bakkar (Lebanon)
26 October 2018
17:00

Tajikistan	0–3	South Korea
	Report	Jeong Yu-jin 16'; Lee Yu-jin 17'; Jo Min-ah 82'

Hisor Central Stadium, Hisor
Attendance: 100
Referee: Công Thi Dựng (Vietnam)

28 October 2018
14:00

South Korea	4–0	Chinese Taipei
Kim Eun-soul 7'; Kang Ji-woo 25' (pen.), 34'; Jung Min-young 57'	Report

Hisor Central Stadium, Hisor
Attendance: 80
Referee: Kate Jacewicz (Australia)
28 October 2018
17:00

Tajikistan	1–5	Bangladesh
Khalimova 44'	Report	Rani 7'; M. Chakma 26', 42', 74'; Shamsunnahar 60'

Hisor Central Stadium, Hisor
Attendance: 150
Referee: Mahsa Ghorbani (Iran)

=== Group E ===
- All matches were held in Vietnam.
- Times listed are UTC+7.

Pos	Team	Pld	W	D	L	GF	GA	GD	Pts	Qualification
1	Vietnam (H)	3	3	0	0	17	1	+16	9	Second round
2	Jordan	3	2	0	1	10	5	+5	6	
3	Malaysia	3	0	1	2	2	4	−2	1	
4	Singapore	3	0	1	2	0	19	−19	1	
5	Northern Mariana Islands	0	0	0	0	0	0	0	0	Withdrew, replaced by Singapore

Source: AFC
Rules for classification: Qualification tiebreakers
(H) Hosts
24 October 2018
15:00

Jordan	8–0	Singapore
Al-Btoush 23', 40', 41', 51'; Fraij 32'; Rob 52'; Al-Barghouthy 89'; Al-Jamaeen 90+3'	Report

Vietnam YFTC Field no. 3, Hanoi
Attendance: 107
Referee: Edita Mirabidova (Uzbekistan)
24 October 2018
18:00

Vietnam	2–1	Malaysia
Nguyễn Thị Tuyết Ngân 60'; Nguyễn Thị Hòa 69'	Report	Waitie 36'

Vietnam YFTC Field no. 3, Hanoi
Attendance: 180
Referee: Saltanat Noroozi (Iran)

26 October 2018
15:00

Malaysia	1–2	Jordan
Faiqah 11'	Report	Soboh 25'; Rob 73' (pen.)

Vietnam YFTC Field no. 3, Hanoi
Attendance: 100
Referee: Lee Yi-chi (Chinese Taipei)
26 October 2018
18:00

Singapore	0–11	Vietnam
	Report	Nguyễn Thị Tuyết Ngân 10', 21', 69'; Trần Thị Thu Xuân 14', 83', 89'; Cù Thị Huỳnh Như 30', 42', 45+2' (pen.), 51'; Vũ Thị Hòa 60'

Vietnam YFTC Field no. 3, Hanoi
Attendance: 157
Referee: Ri Hyang-ok (North Korea)

28 October 2018
15:00

Singapore	0–0	Malaysia
	Report

Vietnam YFTC Field no. 3, Hanoi
Attendance: 56
Referee: Saltanat Noroozi (Iran)
28 October 2018
18:00

Vietnam	4–0	Jordan
Nguyễn Thị Tuyết Ngân 4', 7', 25'; Ngân Thị Vạn Sự 81'	Report

Vietnam YFTC Field no. 3, Hanoi
Attendance: 250
Referee: Edita Mirabidova (Uzbekistan)

=== Group F ===
- All matches were held in Myanmar.
- Times listed are UTC+6:30.

Pos	Team	Pld	W	D	L	GF	GA	GD	Pts	Qualification
1	Iran	2	1	0	1	4	2	+2	3	Second round
2	Myanmar (H)	2	1	0	1	4	4	0	3	Second round
3	Laos	2	1	0	1	5	7	−2	3	
4	Palestine	0	0	0	0	0	0	0	0	Withdrew

Source: AFC
Rules for classification: Qualification tiebreakers
(H) Hosts
24 October 2018
15:00

Iran	4–1	Laos
Ghasemi 38', 46', 90'; Raietparvar 75'	Report	Phimpha 84'

Thuwunna Stadium, Yangon
Attendance: 130
Referee: Bùi Thị Thu Trang (Vietnam)

26 October 2018
18:00

Laos	4–3	Myanmar
Aphatsala 29', 84'; Pe 57', 81'	Report	San Thaw Thaw 9', 77', 90'

Thuwunna Stadium, Yangon
Attendance: 240
Referee: Chang Xinxin (China)

28 October 2018
18:00

Myanmar	1–0	Iran
Hnin Mya Thazin 66'	Report

Thuwunna Stadium, Yangon
Attendance: 320
Referee: Fusako Kajiyama (Japan)

=== Ranking of second-placed teams ===
Due to groups having different number of teams after withdrawals, the results against the fourth-placed and fifth-placed teams in four-team and five-team groups are not considered for this ranking.

Pos	Grp	Team	Pld	W	D	L	GF	GA	GD	Pts	Qualification
1	A	Lebanon	2	1	0	1	4	2	+2	3	Second round
2	F	Myanmar	2	1	0	1	4	4	0	3	Second round
3	C	Kyrgyzstan	2	1	0	1	3	4	−1	3	
4	B	Nepal (Note: Nepal advanced to the second round as the Group B runners-up as Thailand were the Group B winners, who as final tournament hosts, automatically qualified regardless of first round qualification results, and did not advance to the second round.)	2	1	0	1	2	3	−1	3	Second round
5	D	Chinese Taipei	2	1	0	1	2	4	−2	3	
6	E	Jordan	2	1	0	1	2	5	−3	3	

Source: AFC
Rules for classification: 1) points; 2) goal difference; 3) goals scored; 4) disciplinary points; 5) drawing of lots.

== Second round ==
The draw for the second round of the qualifiers was held on 13 February 2019, 15:00 MYT (UTC+8), at the AFC House in Kuala Lumpur, Malaysia. For the second round, the eight teams were drawn into two groups of four teams. The teams were seeded according to their performance in the 2017 AFC U-19 Women's Championship final tournament and qualification. The following restrictions were also applied:

- The two teams which indicated their intention to serve as qualification group hosts prior to the draw were drawn into separate groups.

Participating in qualification second round
Pot 1	Pot 2	Pot 3	Pot 4 (unranked)
1. **Australia**; 2. **South Korea**	3. Uzbekistan; 4. **Vietnam** **(H)**	5. **Myanmar** **(H)**; 6. Iran	Lebanon; Nepal

Notes

- Teams in **bold** qualified for the final tournament.
- (H): Qualification second round group hosts

The second round was played between 26 and 30 April 2019.

=== Group A ===
- All matches were held in Myanmar.
- Times listed are UTC+6:30.

Pos	Team	Pld	W	D	L	GF	GA	GD	Pts	Qualification
1	Australia	3	3	0	0	18	3	+15	**9**	Final tournament
2	Myanmar (H)	3	2	0	1	4	4	0	**6**	Final tournament
3	Uzbekistan	3	1	0	2	5	5	0	**3**	
4	Nepal	3	0	0	3	2	17	−15	**0**	

Source: AFC
Rules for classification: Qualification tiebreakers
(H) Hosts
26 April 2019
16:00

Australia	11–1	Nepal
Fowler 4', 7' (pen.), 15', 34', 54'; Rasamee 12'; Barbieri 36'; Lowe 67'; Cooney-Cross 78'; Riley 85'; Evans 87'	Report	Yonjan 45+2'

Mandalarthiri Stadium, Mandalay
Attendance: 153
Referee: Mi Siyu (China)
26 April 2019
19:00

Uzbekistan	0–1	Myanmar
	Report	San Thaw Thaw 41'

Mandalarthiri Stadium, Mandalay
Attendance: 1,253
Referee: Fusako Kajiyama (Japan)

28 April 2019
16:00

Nepal	0–4	Uzbekistan
	Report	Kurbonova 21', 67'; Rashidova 74'; Khojieva 78'

Mandalarthiri Stadium, Mandalay
Attendance: 105
Referee: Chang Xinxin (China)
28 April 2019
19:00

Myanmar	1–3	Australia
Myat Noe Khin 68'	Report	Ibini-Isei 45+1'; Fowler 47'; Blissett 84'

Mandalarthiri Stadium, Mandalay
Attendance: 3,275
Referee: Saltanat Noroozi (Iran)

30 April 2019
16:00

Australia	4–1	Uzbekistan
Cooney-Cross 41'; Ibini-Isei 49'; Fowler 52'; Blissett 87'	Report	Kurbonova 78'

Mandalarthiri Stadium, Mandalay
Attendance: 128
Referee: Chang Xinxin (China)
30 April 2019
19:00

Myanmar	2–1	Nepal
San Thaw Thaw 47'; May Phu Ko 65'	Report	Raut 39' (pen.)

Mandalarthiri Stadium, Mandalay
Attendance: 5,735
Referee: Saltanat Noroozi (Iran)

=== Group B ===
- All matches were held in Vietnam.
- Times listed are UTC+7.

Pos	Team	Pld	W	D	L	GF	GA	GD	Pts	Qualification
1	South Korea	3	3	0	0	13	1	+12	**9**	Final tournament
2	Vietnam (H)	3	1	1	1	6	4	+2	**4 (Note: Disciplinary points: Vietnam −3, Iran −4.)**	Final tournament
3	Iran	3	1	1	1	6	4	+2	**4**	
4	Lebanon	3	0	0	3	2	18	−16	**0**	

Source: AFC
Rules for classification: Qualification tiebreakers
(H) Hosts
Notes:
26 April 2019
16:00

South Korea	9–0	Lebanon
Kang Ji-woo 10', 40', 53', 79'; Choo Hyo-joo 14'; Jung Min-young 31'; Kim Eun-soul 40'; Kim Soo-jin 64'; Jeong Yu-jin 85'	Report

Vietnam YFTC Field no. 3, Hanoi
Attendance: 150
Referee: Lee Yi-chi (Chinese Taipei)
26 April 2019
19:00

Vietnam	1–1	Iran
Ngân Thị Vạn Sự 13'	Report	Khodabakhshi 54'

Vietnam YFTC Field no. 3, Hanoi
Attendance: 255
Referee: Rebecca Durcau (Australia)

28 April 2019
16:00

Iran	0–2	South Korea
	Report	Jo Min-ah 28'; Park Hye-jeong 85'

Vietnam YFTC Field no. 3, Hanoi
Attendance: 50
Referee: Choki Om (Bhutan)
28 April 2019
19:00

Lebanon	1–4	Vietnam
Bou Rada 67'	Report	Nguyễn Thị Tuyết Ngân 15', 86'; Phạm Thị Lan Anh 27'; Ngô Thị Hồng Nhung 90'

Vietnam YFTC Field no. 3, Hanoi
Attendance: 265
Referee: Thein Thein Aye (Myanmar)

30 April 2019
16:00

Iran	5–1	Lebanon
Raietparvar 15', 47' (pen.); Zandi 32', 60'; Masoumi 70'	Report	El Tayar 1'

Vietnam YFTC Field no. 3, Hanoi
Attendance: 115
Referee: Choki Om (Bhutan)
30 April 2019
19:00

South Korea	2–1	Vietnam
Kim Soo-jin 40', 83'	Report	Nguyễn Thị Tuyết Ngân 71'

Vietnam YFTC Field no. 3, Hanoi
Attendance: 365
Referee: Thein Thein Aye (Myanmar)

== Qualified teams ==
The following eight teams qualified for the final tournament.

Team	Qualified as	Qualified on	Previous appearances in AFC U-19 Women's Championship^{1}
Thailand	Hosts	20 April 2018	6 (2002, 2004, 2007, 2009, 2015, 2017)
Japan	2017 champions	30 May 2018	9 (**2002**, 2004, 2006, 2007, **2009**, **2011**, 2013, **2015**, **2017**)
North Korea	2017 runners-up	30 May 2018	9 (2002, 2004, 2006, **2007**, 2009, 2011, 2013, 2015, 2017)
China	2017 third place	30 May 2018	9 (2002, 2004, **2006**, 2007, 2009, 2011, 2013, 2015, 2017)
Australia	Second round Group A winners	30 April 2019	7 (2006, 2007, 2009, 2011, 2013, 2015, 2017)
Myanmar	Second round Group A runners-up	30 April 2019	3 (2002, 2007, 2013)
South Korea	Second round Group B winners	28 April 2019	9 (2002, **2004**, 2006, 2007, 2009, 2011, **2013**, 2015, 2017)
Vietnam	Second round Group B runners-up	30 April 2019	4 (2004, 2009, 2011, 2017)

^{1} Bold indicates champions for that year. Italic indicates hosts for that year.

== Goalscorers ==
- First round: there were 244 goals scored in 37 matches, for an average of 6.59 goals per match.
- Second round: there were 56 goals scored in 12 matches, for an average of 4.67 goals per match.

In total, there were 310 goals scored in 49 matches, for an average of 6.33 goals per match.

10 goals

- (Uzbekistan) Shahnoza Kurbonova
- (Vietnam) Nguyễn Thị Tuyết Ngân

7 goals

- (Australia) Mary Fowler
- (Australia) Princess Ibini-Isei
- (South Korea) Kang Ji-woo
- (Thailand) Anupha Noinueai

6 goals

- (Australia) Kyra Cooney-Cross
- (Uzbekistan) Tojinisokhon Rashidova

5 goals

- (Australia) Aoife Colvill
- (India) Renu Rani
- (Lebanon) Yara Bou Rada
- (Myanmar) San Thaw Thaw
- (United Arab Emirates) Shahd Al-Zarkan
- (Uzbekistan) Laylo Shodieva

4 goals

- (Australia) Amy Sayer
- (Chinese Taipei) Su Yu-hsuan
- (Guam) Lauren Phillips
- (Jordan) Leen Al-Btoush
- (Kyrgyzstan) Anna Zarodina
- (Thailand) Siriwipa Jantarak
- (United Arab Emirates) Layla Al-Mheiri
- (United Arab Emirates) Salha Rashid
- (Vietnam) Cù Thị Huỳnh Như

3 goals

- (Bangladesh) Monika Chakma
- (Chinese Taipei) Lan Yu-chieh
- (Guam) Hannah Cruz
- (India) Manisha Kalyan
- (India) Devneta Roy
- (Iran) Fatemeh Ghasemi
- (Iran) Vida Raietparvar
- (Kyrgyzstan) Takhmina Alymzhanova
- (Kyrgyzstan) Kenzhebubu Yrysbek Kyzy
- (Lebanon) Samira Awad
- (Nepal) Nisha Thokar
- (South Korea) Jung Min-young
- (South Korea) Kim Eun-soul
- (South Korea) Kim Soo-jin
- (Thailand) Pariyapat Kakkaew
- (United Arab Emirates) Rawan Al-Hammadi
- (Vietnam) Trần Thị Thu Xuân

2 goals

- (Australia) Chelsea Blissett
- (Australia) Rachel Lowe
- (Australia) Rasamee Phonsongkham
- (Australia) Taylor Ray
- (India) Ashem Roja Devi
- (Iran) Negin Zandi
- (Jordan) Tasneem Abu Rob
- (Kyrgyzstan) Shakhnoza Ibraimova
- (Kyrgyzstan) Aiturgan Askar Kyzy
- (Laos) Aphatsala Chanhthavongxay
- (Laos) Pe
- (Nepal) Rekha Poudel
- (Nepal) Puja Rana
- (Nepal) Manjali Kumari Yonjan
- (South Korea) Choo Hyo-joo
- (South Korea) Jeong Yu-jin
- (South Korea) Jo Min-ah
- (Thailand) Ploychompoo Somnuek
- (United Arab Emirates) Mouza Al-Mesmari
- (United Arab Emirates) Alanoud Khaled
- (Uzbekistan) Sugdiyona Allamurodova
- (Uzbekistan) Sabina Amanova
- (Uzbekistan) Nozimakhon Ergasheva
- (Uzbekistan) Munisa Giyasova
- (Uzbekistan) Gulzoda Saidova
- (Uzbekistan) Laylo Tasheva
- (Vietnam) Ngân Thị Vạn Sự

1 goal

- (Australia) MelindaJ Barbieri
- (Australia) Indiah-Paige Riley
- (Australia) Shadeene Evans
- (Bangladesh) Krishna Rani Sarkar
- (Bangladesh) Shamsunnahar
- (Chinese Taipei) Chen Hsiu-wen
- (Chinese Taipei) Lin Hsin-hui
- (Guam) Isabella Bass
- (Guam) Rylee Guzman
- (Guam) Sabrina Kenney
- (Guam) Shyann Roberto
- (Guam) Ysabella Vasquez
- (Guam) Isa Whalen
- (India) Daya Devi
- (India) Yumlembam Pakpi Devi
- (India) Soumya Guguloth
- (India) Grace Hauhnar
- (India) Jabamani Tudu
- (Iran) Zahra Khodabakhshi
- (Iran) Zahra Masoumi
- (Jordan) Tala Al-Barghouthy
- (Jordan) Enas Al-Jamaeen
- (Jordan) Rouzbahan Fraij
- (Jordan) Deanna Soboh
- (Kyrgyzstan) Alina Akylbekova
- (Kyrgyzstan) Viktoriia Dalinger
- (Kyrgyzstan) Adinai Duishobaeva
- (Kyrgyzstan) Altynai Kanatbek Kyzy
- (Laos) Phimpha Thongsavang
- (Lebanon) Farah El Tayar
- (Lebanon) Melanie Ghanime
- (Lebanon) Layla Iskandar
- (Lebanon) Hanin Tamim
- (Malaysia) Faiqah Safira
- (Malaysia) Waitie Taming
- (Mongolia) Enkhbaatar Enkhmargad
- (Myanmar) Hnin Mya Thazin
- (Myanmar) May Phu Ko
- (Myanmar) Myat Noe Khin
- (Nepal) Alisa Jimba
- (Nepal) Samjhana Lawati
- (Nepal) Sara Limbu
- (Nepal) Manisha Raut
- (South Korea) Kim Seo-yeon
- (South Korea) Lee Yu-jin
- (South Korea) Mun Jin-seo
- (South Korea) Park Hye-jeong
- (South Korea) Park Mid-eum
- (Tajikistan) Gulsunbi Khalimova
- (Thailand) Pattaranan Aupachai
- (Thailand) Tipkritta Onsamai
- (Thailand) Chatchawan Rodthong
- (Thailand) Phonchita Thaenprathum
- (United Arab Emirates) Sendya Al-Mazrouei
- (United Arab Emirates) Shaikha Saeed
- (Uzbekistan) Diyora Erkinova
- (Uzbekistan) Ozoda Khojieva
- (Uzbekistan) Mukhlisa Mardieva
- (Uzbekistan) Makhliyo Nazarkulova
- (Uzbekistan) Arina Smirnova
- (Uzbekistan) Shakhrizoda Zaynitdinova
- (Vietnam) Ngô Thị Hồng Nhung
- (Vietnam) Nguyễn Thị Hòa
- (Vietnam) Phạm Thị Lan Anh
- (Vietnam) Vũ Thị Hòa

1 own goal

- (Maldives) Aishath Sana Ibrahim (against Guam)
- (Mongolia) Gantumur Temuulen (against Australia)

2 own goals

- (Pakistan) Eman Fayyaz (against India, Thailand)
