= 2017 AFC U-19 Women's Championship qualification =

Tournament details
- Host countries: China (Group A); Tajikistan (Group B); Myanmar (Group C); Vietnam (Group D)
- Dates: 27 October – 24 December 2016
- Teams: 18 (from 1 confederation)
- Venue(s): 4 (in 4 host cities)

Tournament statistics
- Matches played: 18
- Goals scored: 93 (5.17 per match)
- Attendance: 6,813 (379 per match)
- Top scorer(s): (Australia) Remy Siemsen (10 goals)

The 2017 AFC U-19 Women's Championship qualification was a women's under-19 football competition which decided the participating teams of the 2017 AFC U-19 Women's Championship.

A total of 18 teams entered the qualification tournament, which decided four of the eight participating teams in the final tournament held in China.

== Draw ==
Of the 47 AFC member associations, a total of 22 teams entered the competition, with Japan, North Korea, South Korea and the host nation China PR automatically qualified for the final tournament by their position as the top four teams of the 2015 AFC U-19 Women's Championship and thus did not participate in the qualifying competition.

The draw for the qualifiers was held on 19 May 2016, 16:00 MYT (UTC+8), at the AFC House in Kuala Lumpur, Malaysia. The 18 teams were drawn into four groups: two groups of five teams and two groups of four teams.

The teams were seeded according to their performance in the previous season in 2015 AFC U-19 Women's Championship final tournament and qualification. The following restrictions were also applied:

- The three teams which indicated their intention to serve as qualification group hosts prior to the draw were drawn into separate groups.

Automatically qualified for final tournament and not participating in qualification
1. **Japan**; 2. **North Korea**; 3. **South Korea**; 4. **China**
Participating in qualification
Pot 1	Pot 2	Pot 3	Pot 4	Pot 5 (unranked)
5. **Australia**; 6. **Thailand** **(H)**; 7. **Uzbekistan**; 8. Iran	9. **Vietnam** **(H)**; 10. Jordan; 11. Myanmar; 12. Chinese Taipei	13. Palestine; 14. India; 15. Hong Kong; 16. Lebanon **(W)**	17. Singapore **(W)**	Kyrgyzstan; Northern Mariana Islands; Pakistan **(W)**; Philippines **(W)**; Tajikistan **(H)**

Notes

- Teams in **bold** qualified for the final tournament.
- (H): Qualification group hosts (remaining group hosted at neutral venue)
- (W): Withdrew after draw

Did not enter

- Afghanistan
- Bahrain
- Bangladesh
- Bhutan
- Brunei
- Cambodia
- Guam
- Indonesia
- Iraq
- Kuwait (suspended)
- Laos
- Macau
- Malaysia
- Maldives
- Mongolia
- Nepal
- Oman
- Qatar
- Saudi Arabia
- Sri Lanka
- Syria
- Timor-Leste
- Turkmenistan
- United Arab Emirates
- Yemen

== Player eligibility ==
Players born between 1 January 1998 and 31 December 2001 were eligible to compete in the 2017 AFC U-19 Women's Championship.

== Format ==
In each group, teams played each other once at a centralised venue. The four group winners qualified for the final tournament.

=== Tiebreakers ===
Teams were ranked according to points (3 points for a win, 1 point for a draw, 0 points for a loss), and if tied on points, the following tiebreaking criteria were applied, in the order given, to determine the rankings (Regulations Article 11.5):

1. Points in head-to-head matches among tied teams;
2. Goal difference in head-to-head matches among tied teams;
3. Goals scored in head-to-head matches among tied teams;
4. If more than two teams are tied, and after applying all head-to-head criteria above, a subset of teams are still tied, all head-to-head criteria above are reapplied exclusively to this subset of teams;
5. Goal difference in all group matches;
6. Goals scored in all group matches;
7. Penalty shoot-out if only two teams are tied and they met in the last round of the group;
8. Disciplinary points (yellow card = 1 point, red card as a result of two yellow cards = 3 points, direct red card = 3 points, yellow card followed by direct red card = 4 points);
9. Drawing of lots.

== Groups ==
The matches were scheduled for 27 October – 6 November 2016. Group C was postponed to 20–24 December 2016 due to the death of King Bhumibol Adulyadej.

=== Group A ===
- All matches were held in China (neutral venue host).
- Times listed were UTC+8.

Pos	Team	Pld	W	D	L	GF	GA	GD	Pts	Qualification
1	Australia	2	2	0	0	23	1	+22	6	Final tournament
2	Jordan	2	1	0	1	5	7	−2	3	
3	Northern Mariana Islands	2	0	0	2	0	20	−20	0	
4	Lebanon	0	0	0	0	0	0	0	0	Withdrew
5	Singapore	0	0	0	0	0	0	0	0	Withdrew

Source: AFC
Rules for classification: Qualification tiebreakers
2 November 2016
16:00

Northern Mariana Islands	0–16	Australia
	Report	Vine 3'; Chidiac 5', 23', 35', 47'; Plessas 17'; Siemsen 19', 27', 30', 33', 42', 79', 90+4'; Sayer 25'; Ibini 81', 82'

Jiangsu Training Base Stadium, Nanjing
Attendance: 40
Referee: Shiva Yari (Iran)

4 November 2016
16:00

Jordan	4–0	Northern Mariana Islands
Feras 12'; Abu-Rob 28' (pen.); Zabian 42'; Fakoury 69'	Report

Jiangsu Training Base Stadium, Nanjing
Attendance: 40
Referee: Edita Mirabidova (Uzbekistan)

6 November 2016
16:00

Australia	7–1	Jordan
Vine 30'; Siemsen 41', 43', 67'; Chidiac 50'; Ibini 64'; Sayer 85'	Report	Zabian 30'

Jiangsu Training Base Stadium, Nanjing
Attendance: 50
Referee: Cong Thi Dung (Vietnam)

=== Group B ===
- All matches were held in Tajikistan.
- Times listed were UTC+5.

Pos	Team	Pld	W	D	L	GF	GA	GD	Pts	Qualification
1	Uzbekistan	3	3	0	0	7	0	+7	9	Final tournament
2	Chinese Taipei	3	2	0	1	8	3	+5	6	
3	Hong Kong	3	1	0	2	1	6	−5	3	
4	Tajikistan (H)	3	0	0	3	2	9	−7	0	
5	Pakistan	0	0	0	0	0	0	0	0	Withdrew

Source: AFC
Rules for classification: Qualification tiebreakers
(H) Hosts
27 October 2016
14:00

Chinese Taipei	3–0	Hong Kong
Lan Yu-chieh 74', 78'; Chen Ying-hui 76'	Report

Central Republican Stadium, Dushanbe
Attendance: 50
Referee: Seinn Cho Aung (Myanmar)
27 October 2016
17:00

Uzbekistan	3–0	Tajikistan
Kurbonova 23'; Kulturayeva 67'; Burkhonova 71'	Report

Central Republican Stadium, Dushanbe
Attendance: 600
Referee: Rita Gani (Malaysia)

29 October 2016
14:00

Hong Kong	0–3	Uzbekistan
	Report	Bobokhujaeva 53'; Kurbonova 78', 79'

Central Republican Stadium, Dushanbe
Attendance: 100
Referee: Saltanat Noroozi (Iran)
29 October 2016
17:00

Tajikistan	2–5	Chinese Taipei
Shukronai 38'; Khalimova 81'	Report	Liang Kai-jou 16'; Yu Wen-chieh 55'; Tsai Pei-yu 62'; Chen Ying-hui 72'; Zhuo Li-ping 90+4'

Central Republican Stadium, Dushanbe
Attendance: 400
Referee: Kajiyama Fusako (Japan)

31 October 2016
14:00

Uzbekistan	1–0	Chinese Taipei
Panjeva 26' (pen.)	Report

Central Republican Stadium, Dushanbe
Attendance: 200
Referee: Kajiyama Fusako (Japan)
31 October 2016
17:00

Hong Kong	1–0	Tajikistan
Chung Pui Ki 70' (pen.)	Report

Central Republican Stadium, Dushanbe
Attendance: 400
Referee: Saltanat Noroozi (Iran)

=== Group C ===
- All matches were held in Myanmar.
- Times listed were UTC+6.

Pos	Team	Pld	W	D	L	GF	GA	GD	Pts	Qualification
1	Thailand	3	3	0	0	18	1	+17	9	Final tournament
2	Myanmar (H)	3	2	0	1	15	2	+13	6	
3	Kyrgyzstan	3	1	0	2	6	11	−5	3	
4	Palestine	3	0	0	3	0	25	−25	0	

Source: AFC
Rules for classification: Qualification tiebreakers
(H) Hosts
20 December 2016
15:00

Thailand	7–0	Kyrgyzstan
Jiraporn 15', 72', 90' (pen.), 90+2'; Kanyanat 24', 29', 42'	Report

Thuwunna YTC Stadium, Yangon
Attendance: 621
Referee: Cong Thi Dung (Vietnam)
20 December 2016
18:00

Myanmar	10–0	Palestine
Nu Nu 26', 87', 90+1'; July Kyaw 33', 37', 47', 58', 68'; Shwe Moe Aye 39'; Thinzar Cho 90+5'	Report

Thuwunna YTC Stadium, Yangon
Attendance: 752
Referee: Saltanat Noroozi (Iran)

22 December 2016
15:00

Palestine	0–9	Thailand
	Report	Kanyanat 17', 63', 69', 74'; Jiraporn 41' (pen.), 45+5'; Sirikan 56'; Nutwadee 61'; Kullasatree 67'

Thuwunna YTC Stadium, Yangon
Attendance: 50
Referee: Anna Sidorova (Uzbekistan)
22 December 2016
18:00

Kyrgyzstan	0–4	Myanmar
	Report	Gaier 22' (o.g.); July Kyaw 53', 58', 63'

Thuwunna YTC Stadium, Yangon
Attendance: 750
Referee: Saltanat Noroozi (Iran)

24 December 2016
15:00

Palestine	0–6	Kyrgyzstan
	Report	Kyzy 16', 45+3', 86'; Dalinger 69' (pen.), 89'; Toktobolotova 78'

Thuwunna YTC Stadium, Yangon
Attendance: 231
Referee: Cong Thi Dung (Vietnam)
24 December 2016
18:00

Thailand	2–1	Myanmar
Kanyanat 34'; Jiraporn 47'	Report	July Kyaw 90+2'

Thuwunna YTC Stadium, Yangon
Attendance: 1,679
Referee: Oh Hyeon-jeong (South Korea)

=== Group D ===
- All matches were held in Vietnam.
- Times listed were UTC+7.

Philippines withdrew because of conflicts with college schedules.

Pos	Team	Pld	W	D	L	GF	GA	GD	Pts	Qualification
1	Vietnam (H)	2	2	0	0	6	0	+6	6	Final tournament
2	Iran	2	0	1	1	1	3	−2	1	
3	India	2	0	1	1	1	5	−4	1	
4	Philippines	0	0	0	0	0	0	0	0	Withdrew

Source: AFC
Rules for classification: Qualification tiebreakers
(H) Hosts
2 November 2016
16:00

India	1–1	Iran
K. Devi 59'	Report	Mokhtarifar 82'

Vietnam YFT Center Field no. 3, Hanoi
Attendance: 200
Referee: Yoshimi Yamashita (Japan)

4 November 2016
16:00

Vietnam	4–0	India
Nguyễn Thị Tuyết Ngân 37' (pen.), 44'; Nguyễn Thị Nụ 83'; Hà Thị Nhài 90+2'	Report

Vietnam YFT Center Field no. 3, Hanoi
Attendance: 250
Referee: Anna Sidorova (Uzbekistan)

6 November 2016
16:00

Iran	0–2	Vietnam
	Report	Nguyễn Thị Nụ 51'; Nguyễn Thị Tuyết Ngân 90+2'

Vietnam YFT Center Field no. 3, Hanoi
Attendance: 400
Referee: Kim Sook-hee (South Korea)

== Qualified teams ==
The following eight teams qualified for the final tournament.

Team	Qualified as	Qualified on	Previous appearances in AFC U-19 Women's Championship^{1}
Japan	2015 champions	19 May 2016	8 (**2002**, 2004, 2006, 2007, **2009**, **2011**, 2013, **2015**)
North Korea	2015 champions	19 May 2016	8 (2002, 2004, 2006, **2007**, 2009, 2011, 2013, 2015)
South Korea	2015 third place	19 May 2016	8 (2002, **2004**, 2006, 2007, 2009, 2011, **2013**, 2015)
China	2015 fourth place	19 May 2016	8 (2002, 2004, **2006**, 2007, 2009, 2011, 2013, 2015)
Australia	Group A winners	6 November 2016	6 (2006, 2007, 2009, 2011, 2013, 2015)
Uzbekistan	Group B winners	31 October 2016	3 (2002, 2004, 2015)
Thailand	Group C winners	24 December 2016	5 (2002, 2004, 2007, 2009, 2015)
Vietnam	Group D winners	6 November 2016	3 (2004, 2009, 2011)

^{1} Bold indicates champions for that year. Italic indicates hosts for that year.

== Goalscorers ==
There were 93 goals scored in 18 matches, for an average of 5.17 goals per match.

10 goals

- (Australia) Remy Siemsen

9 goals

- (Myanmar) July Kyaw

8 goals

- (Thailand) Kanyanat Chetthabutr

7 goals

- (Thailand) Jiraporn Mongkoldee

5 goals

- (Australia) Alex Chidiac

3 goals

- (Australia) Princess Ibini
- (Kyrgyzstan) Kenzhebubu Yrysbek Kyzy
- (Myanmar) Nu Nu
- (Uzbekistan) Shahnoza Kurbonova
- (Vietnam) Nguyễn Thị Tuyết Ngân

2 goals

- (Australia) Amy Sayer
- (Australia) Cortnee Vine
- (Chinese Taipei) Chen Ying-hui
- (Chinese Taipei) Lan Yu-chieh
- (Jordan) Yasmeen Zabian
- (Kyrgyzstan) Viktoriia Dalinger
- (Vietnam) Nguyễn Thị Nụ

1 goal

- (Australia) Georgia Plessas
- (Chinese Taipei) Liang Kai-jou
- (Chinese Taipei) Tsai Pei-yu
- (Chinese Taipei) Yu Wen-chieh
- (Chinese Taipei) Zhuo Li-ping
- (Hong Kong) Chung Pui Ki
- (India) Kashmina Devi
- (Iran) Hanieh Mokhtarifar
- (Jordan) Tasneem Abu-Rob
- (Jordan) Lana Feras
- (Jordan) Zenia Fakoury
- (Kyrgyzstan) Baktygul Toktobolotova
- (Myanmar) Shwe Moe Aye
- (Myanmar) Thinzar Cho
- (Tajikistan) Gulsunbi Khalimova
- (Tajikistan) Jumakhon Shukronai
- (Thailand) Kullasatree Jaiton
- (Thailand) Nutwadee Pram-Nak
- (Thailand) Sirikan Phayaknet
- (Uzbekistan) Feruza Bobokhujaeva
- (Uzbekistan) Malika Burkhonova
- (Uzbekistan) Shoira Kulturayeva
- (Uzbekistan) Maftuna Panjeva
- (Vietnam) Hà Thị Nhài

1 own goal

- (Kyrgyzstan) Angelina Gaier (against Myanmar)
