= 2025 WAFF U-20 Girls Championship =

Women's national youth association football tournament

بطولة اتحاد غرب آسيا الخامسة للشابات الأردن ۲۰۲٥

Tournament details
- Host country: Jordan
- City: Aqaba
- Dates: 6–12 April
- Teams: 4 (from 1 sub-confederation)
- Venue: 1 (in 1 host city)

Final positions
- Champions: Palestine (1st title)
- Runners-up: Jordan
- Third place: Syria
- Fourth place: Kuwait

Tournament statistics
- Matches played: 8
- Goals scored: 33 (4.13 per match)
- Top scorer(s): (Syria) Aya Mohammed (7 goals)
- Best player: (Jordan) Kinda Al-Titi
- Best goalkeeper: (Palestine) Mirave Marouf

The 2025 WAFF U-20 Girls Championship (Arabic: بطولة اتحاد غرب آسيا الخامسة للشابات) was the 5th edition of the WAFF Youth Girls Championship, the international women's football youth championship of Western Asia organized by the West Asian Football Federation (WAFF) for the women's under-20 national teams. It was held in Aqaba, Jordan, from 6 to 12 April 2025. and it was the first edition of the tournament to be restricted to the under-20 level, following four previous editions held at the under-18 level.

Host Jordan entered the tournament as the defending champions, having secured their second title just four months earlier. However, they were unable to retain the title, falling to Palestine in the final. The victory marked Palestine's first-ever title in WAFF history—across both men's and women's competitions—and their first in any women's tournament.

== Participation ==
=== Participating teams ===
Four out of the 12 WAFF member associations registered teams for the competition, three of which had participated in the 2024 edition. Kuwait returned to the tournament for the first time since their debut in 2019.

Country	App.	Previous best performance
Jordan	5th	Champions (2018, 2024)
Kuwait	2nd	Sixth place (2019)
Palestine	4th	Third place (2018, 2024)
Syria	3rd	Runners-up (2022)

Did not enter

- Bahrain and Saudi Arabia – the two Gulf nations did not enter the tournament, having scheduled a two-match friendly series against each other during the same period. Bahrain last participated in 2019, while Saudi Arabia's last appearance was in the previous edition (2024).
- Lebanon opted to participate in the 2025 UEFA Women's U-18 Friendship Cup in Riva, Turkey, during the same period, seeking stronger preparatory matches. Lebanon last participated in 2024.

Other WAFF members Iraq and United Arab Emirates chose not to participate. Meanwhile, Oman, Qatar, and Yemen do not field women's teams at this category or at all.

=== Draw ===
The tournament draw to determine the positions of the participating teams was held on 13 March 2025 at 12:00 AST (UTC+3) and streamed live on the federation's YouTube channel.

The draw resulted in the following positions:

Pos	Team
A1	Jordan
A2	Kuwait
A3	Palestine
A4	Syria

=== Squads ===
Players born between 1 January 2006 and 31 December 2010 were eligible to compete in the tournament.

== Group stage ==
All times are local, AST (UTC+3).

Pos	Team	Pld	W	D	L	GF	GA	GD	Pts	Qualification
1	Jordan	3	3	0	0	6	0	+6	9	Final
2	Palestine	3	1	1	1	10	4	+6	4	Final
3	Syria	3	1	1	1	7	3	+4	4	Third place play-off
4	Kuwait	3	0	0	3	0	16	−16	0	Third place play-off

Source: WAFF
Rules for classification: 1) Points; 2) head-to-head matches; 3) Goal difference; 4) Number of goals scored.
6 April 2025
16:00

Kuwait	0–9	Palestine
	Report	Abdeen 13', 52'; N. Phillips 17', 67'; Qassis 42', 62', 65'; Abu Asfar 48'; Asad 53'

Aqaba Stadium, Aqaba
Referee: Ammar Abo Alo (Syria)
6 April 2025
19:00

Jordan	2–0	Syria
Tamimi 55', 82'	Report; Report (JFA)

Aqaba Stadium, Aqaba
Referee: Doumouh Al-Bakkar (Lebanon)

8 April 2025
16:00

Syria	6–0	Kuwait
Mohammad 9', 70', 90+4'; Dayoub 37'; Baddour 43'; Ebrahim 60'	Report

Aqaba Stadium, Aqaba
Referee: Yasmin Nairoukh (Palestine)
8 April 2025
19:00

Palestine	0–3	Jordan
	Report; Report (JFA)	Shqair 59'; Al-Khawaja 72'; Tamimi 79'

Aqaba Stadium, Aqaba
Referee: Haneen Marei (Lebanon)

10 April 2025
16:00

Palestine	1–1	Syria
N. Phillips 8'	Report	Al-Jany 83'

Aqaba Stadium, Aqaba
Referee: Esraa Al-Mbaiden (Jordan)
10 April 2025
19:00

Jordan	1–0	Kuwait
Tamimi 55'	Report; Report (JFA)

Aqaba Stadium, Aqaba
Referee: Ammar Abo Alo (Syria)

== Knockout stage ==
In the knockout stage, penalty shoot-out was used to decide the winner if necessary.

Final
12 April - Aqaba
Jordan	1 (2)
Palestine (p)	1 (4)
Third place play-off
12 April - Aqaba
Syria	7
Kuwait	1

=== Third place play-off ===
12 April 2025
11:00

Syria	7–1	Kuwait
Al-Jany 2', 39'; Mohammad 11', 18', 82', 85'; Harb 69'	Report	Behbehani 13'

Aqaba Stadium, Aqaba
Referee: Esraa Al-Mbaiden (Jordan)

=== Final ===
12 April 2025
15:00

Jordan	1–1	Palestine
Abbaas 77'	Report	Ghneim 50'
Penalties
Abbaas (penalty missed); Al-Saheli (penalty missed); Silawi (penalty scored); Shqair (penalty scored)	2–4	(penalty scored) Sansur; (penalty missed) Abdeen; (penalty scored) Asad; (penalty scored) N. Phillips; (penalty scored) Qassis

Aqaba Stadium, Aqaba
Referee: Doumouh Al-Bakkar (Lebanon)

== Goalscorers ==
There were 33 goals scored in 8 matches, for an average of 4.12 goals per match.

7 goals

- (Syria) Aya Mohammad

4 goals

- (Jordan) Ida Tamimi

3 goals

- (Palestine) Naomi Phillips
- (Palestine) Miral Qassis
- (Syria) Mai Al-Jany

2 goals

- (Palestine) Dina Abdeen

1 goal

- (Jordan) Marah Abbaas
- (Jordan) Deanna Al-Khawaja
- (Jordan) Khetam Shqair
- (Kuwait) Meisa Behbehani
- (Palestine) Narin Abu Asfar
- (Palestine) Dalia Asad
- (Palestine) Selina Ghneim
- (Syria) Nivin Baddour
- (Syria) Hayat Dayoub
- (Syria) Lilas Ebrahim
- (Syria) Tala Harb

Source: WAFF
