= Joya =

Joya may refer to:

- Joyà, a Cirque du Soleil show in Riviera Maya, Mexico
- Joya (album), a 1997 album by Will Oldham
- Joya (drink), a Mexican fruit soda brand owned by The Coca-Cola Company
- Joya (singer), a R&B singer
- Joya, India, a town in Uttar Pradesh, India
- Joya Maria Azzi (born 2000), Lebanese footballer
- Joya Mooi (born 1990), Dutch singer-songwriter
- Joya Sherrill, American jazz vocalist and children's television host
- Malalai Joya, Afghan politician
- Sara Joya, Peruvian volleyball player
