= Lebanon women's national under-20 football team =

Lebanon under-20
- Nickname(s): شابات الأرز (The Young Cedars)
- Association: Lebanese Football Association (LFA)
- Confederation: AFC (Asia)
- Sub-confederation: WAFF (West Asia)
- Head coach: Joseph Mouawad
- Captain: Cecile Iskandar
- Top scorer: Christy Maalouf (11)
- Home stadium: Various
- FIFA code: LBN
First colours	Second colours

First international
- Jordan 3–0 Lebanon (Amman, Jordan; 5 November 2014)

Biggest win
- Hong Kong 0–6 Lebanon (Jounieh, Lebanon; 24 October 2018)

Biggest defeat
- South Korea 9–0 Lebanon (Hanoi, Vietnam; 26 April 2019)

WAFF U-18 Girls Championship
- Appearances: 4 (first in 2018)
- Best result: Champions (2019, 2022)
Medal record
Women's football
WAFF U-18 Girls Championship
Gold medal – first place	2019 Bahrain
Gold medal – first place	2022 Lebanon
Silver medal – second place	2018 Lebanon
Silver medal – second place	2024 Jordan

The Lebanon women's national under-20 football team (Arabic: منتخب لبنان لكرة القدم تحت 20 سنة للسيدات), colloquially known as "the Young Cedars" (Arabic: شابات الأرز), represents Lebanon in international women's youth football. The team is controlled by the Lebanese Football Association (LFA), the governing body for football in Lebanon. The team also serves as the women's national under-19 and women's national under-18 football team of Lebanon.

While the team has never participated in either the FIFA U-20 Women's World Cup or the AFC U-20 Women's Asian Cup, they have won two WAFF U-18 Girls Championship titles, in 2019 and 2022, and were runners-up in 2018 and 2024.

== History ==
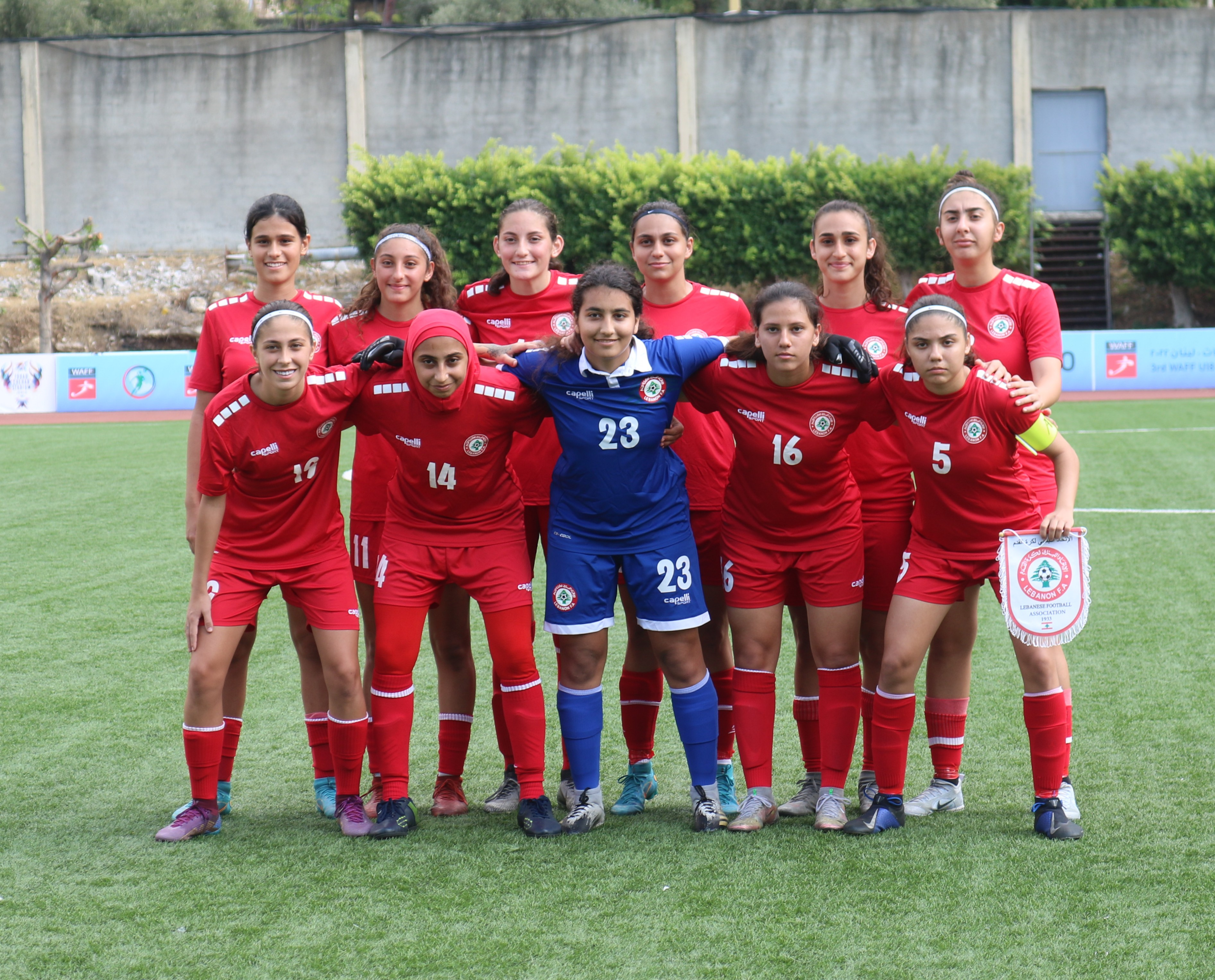
Lebanon U18 at the 2022 WAFF U-18 Girls Championship

=== Early history (2014–2019) ===
The national team played their first competitive matches at the qualifiers for the 2015 AFC U-19 Women's Championship in November 2014. Drawn with Jordan, Uzbekistan and India, Lebanon lost all three games, finishing last in their qualifying group. Following funding and initiatives by the Lebanese Football Association towards women's football, and more specifically youth women's football, the women's national youth teams started to see success, especially in Western Asia. As of 2020, there were separate club leagues for the U15s, U17s, U19s and seniors.

In 2018 Lebanon hosted the inaugural WAFF U-18 Women's Championship between August and September, in preparation for the 2019 AFC U-19 Women's Championship qualification the following October. After defeating Palestine 3–0 in the opening game, Lebanon lost 2–1 to Jordan in the effective final of the WAFF Championship and finished runners-up. In October 2018, Lebanon hosted their group in the first round of Asian qualifiers, in which they were drawn with Australia, Mongolia and Hong Kong; despite losing 2–0 to Australia, Lebanon won against the other two teams (thanks to four goals by Yara Bou Rada against Hong Kong and three goals by Samira Awad) and qualified to the second round. They were the only Arab country to do so.

During this period, most of the U19s players were also called up to the senior team. In January 2019, 17 of the 23 players called up to the 2019 WAFF Women's Championship in Bahrain came from the U19 team, bringing the average age of the squad to 18.9 years. Lebanon eventually finished third. The players returned in April 2019 to compete in the second round of Asian U-19 qualifiers. Needing a second-place finish in their group of four teams to reach the final tournament, Lebanon finished last after losing against South Korea, Vietnam and Iran.

=== West Asian success (2019–present) ===
The team's first success came in 2019, in the second edition of the WAFF U-18 Championship in Bahrain. After winning all three games in the group stage, Lebanon advanced the semi-finals, where they defeated Palestine 4–2 to reach the final against hosts Bahrain. Lebanon won 3–0 and were crowned champions for the first time. Three years later, in 2022, Lebanon won their second-consecutive WAFF Championship title on home soil after beating Syria 5–1 in the final.

In March 2023, Lebanon took part in the first round of 2024 Asian Cup qualification, which had been rebranded as an under-20 competition. After defeating Bhutan (6–2) and Mongolia (7–0), Lebanon drew their decisive game against Jordan (0–0) and progressed to the second round for the second consecutive year. Less than three months later, in June, Lebanon were drawn with Australia, Vietnam and Iran. Similarly to 2019, Lebanon lost all three matches and finished last in their group.

In November 2024, Lebanon participated in the fourth edition of the WAFF U-18 Girls Championship; the tournament was played in a single round-robin format, with defending champions Lebanon finishing second in a group with Jordan, Palestine and Saudi Arabia.

The team played in the 2026 Asian Cup qualification in August 2025, and were drawn with China, Cambodia, and Syria. After consecutive victories against Cambodia (1–0) and Syria (2–1), Lebanon needed a draw to progress to the final tournament. Against China, Lebanon were handed a heavy defeat (8–0) and did not qualify to the tournament on account of having a lower goal difference than other second-placed teams.

== Results and fixtures ==
The following is a list of match results in the last 12 months, as well as any future matches that have been scheduled.

Win Draw Loss Fixture

== Players ==
=== Current squad ===
The following 16 players were called up for the friendly matches against Malta on 22 and 24 October 2025.

Player names marked in bold have been capped at full international level.

No.	Pos.	Player	Date of birth (age)	Club
1	GK	Marie-Joe Chebli	14 February 2009 (age 17)	(Lebanese Football Association) EFP
22	GK	**Marcelle Skaiki**	1 February 2007 (age 19)	(Lebanese Football Association) No Limits
2	DF	**Ayana Rezkallah**	21 April 2008 (age 18)	(Lebanese Football Association) EFP
4	DF	Haya Najjad	6 January 2008 (age 18)	(Lebanese Football Association) BFA
8	DF	Gianna Frangieh	11 November 2009 (age 17)	(Lebanese Football Association) Salam Zgharta
11	DF	Sarah Fakih	22 March 2008 (age 18)	(Lebanese Football Association) Jwaya
14	DF	Lynn Moutran	25 August 2008 (age 18)	(Lebanese Football Association) BFA
6	MF	Celine Bitar	17 July 2007 (age 19)	(Lebanese Football Association) Salam Zgharta
10	MF	**Cecile Iskandar** (captain)	12 March 2007 (age 19)	(Lebanese Football Association) BFA
12	MF	Gabriella Fadel	8 November 2008 (age 18)	(United States Soccer Federation) Youngstown State Penguins
18	MF	**Paula Karam**	20 September 2007 (age 19)	(Lebanese Football Association) Jounieh
7	FW	**Sherin Hasno**	25 March 2007 (age 19)	(Danish Football Association) HB Køge
9	FW	**Maryam Lazkani**	3 July 2007 (age 19)	(United States Soccer Federation) San Jose State Spartans
17	FW	Caren Serhal	1 January 2008 (age 18)	(Lebanese Football Association) No Limits
19	FW	Luna Khazem	1 November 2007 (age 19)	(United States Soccer Federation) Cypress Chargers
20	FW	Sara Issa	18 February 2009 (age 17)	(Lebanese Football Association) Jounieh

== Top scorers ==
As of 22 October 2025
Players in bold are still active with Lebanon.

Rank	Player	Goals
1	Christy Maalouf	**11**
2	Lili Iskandar	**10**
3	**Sherin Hasno**	**8**
4	Farah El Tayar	**6**

== Competitive record ==
=== FIFA U-20 Women's World Cup ===
FIFA U-20 Women's World Cup record										Qualification record						
Host nation(s) and year	Round	Pos	Pld	W	D	L	GF	GA	Squad	Outcome	Pld	W	D	L	GF	GA
(Canada) 2002	Did not enter									Did not enter						
(Thailand) 2004	Did not enter									Did not enter						
(Russia) 2006	Did not enter									Did not enter						
(Chile) 2008	Did not enter									Did not enter						
(Germany) 2010	Did not enter									Did not enter						
(Japan) 2012	Did not enter									Did not enter						
(Canada) 2014	Did not enter									Did not enter						
(Papua New Guinea) 2016	Did not qualify									The 2015 AFC U-19 Women's Championship served as the qualifying tournament						
(France) 2018	Did not enter									Did not enter						
(Costa Rica) 2022	Did not qualify									The 2019 AFC U-19 Women's Championship served as the qualifying tournament						
(Colombia) 2024	Did not qualify									The 2024 AFC U-20 Women's Asian Cup served as the qualifying tournament						
(Poland) 2026	Did not qualify									The 2026 AFC U-20 Women's Asian Cup will serve as the qualifying tournament						
Total	–	0/12	–	–	–	–	–	–	–	Total	–	–	–	–	–	–

=== AFC U-20 Women's Asian Cup ===
AFC U-20 Women's Asian Cup record										Qualification record						
Host nation(s) and year	Round	Pos	Pld	W	D	L	GF	GA	Squad	Outcome	Pld	W	D	L	GF	GA
(India) 2002	Did not enter									Did not enter						
(China) 2004	Did not enter									Did not enter						
(Malaysia) 2006	Did not enter									Did not enter						
(China) 2007	Did not enter									Did not enter						
(China) 2009	Did not enter									Did not enter						
(Vietnam) 2011	Did not enter									Did not enter						
(China) 2013	Did not enter									Did not enter						
(China) 2015	Did not qualify									4th of 4	3	0	0	3	1	13
(China) 2017	Did not enter									Did not enter						
(Thailand) 2019	Did not qualify									2nd of 5, 4th of 4	6	2	0	4	12	20
(Uzbekistan) 2024	Did not qualify									1st of 4, 4th of 4	6	2	1	3	14	12
(Thailand) 2026	Did not qualify									2nd of 4	3	2	0	1	3	9
Total	–	0/11	–	–	–	–	–	–	–	Total	18	6	1	11	30	54

=== WAFF U-18 Girls Championship ===
WAFF U-20 Girls Championship record
Host nation(s) and year	Round	Pos	Pld	W	D	L	GF	GA
(Lebanon) 2018	**Runners-up**	**2nd of 3**	**2**	**1**	**0**	**1**	**4**	**2**
(Bahrain) 2019	**Champions**	**1st of 7**	**5**	**5**	**0**	**0**	**17**	**3**
(Lebanon) 2022	**Champions**	**1st of 7**	**4**	**4**	**0**	**0**	**13**	**2**
(Jordan) 2024	**Runners-up**	**2nd of 4**	**3**	**1**	**2**	**0**	**6**	**2**
(Jordan) 2025	Did not participate							
Total	Best: champions	4/5	14	11	2	1	40	9

== See also ==
- Lebanon women's national football team
- Lebanon women's national under-17 football team
- Lebanon national under-20 football team
- Women's football in Lebanon
- Football in Lebanon
