= 2024 WAFF U-18 Girls Championship =

Women's national youth association football tournament

بطولة اتحاد غرب آسيا الرابعة للشابات الأردن ٢٠٢٤

Tournament details
- Host country: Jordan
- City: Aqaba
- Dates: 28 November – 6 December
- Teams: 5 (from 1 sub-confederation)
- Venue: 1 (in 1 host city)

Final positions
- Champions: Jordan (2nd title)
- Runners-up: Lebanon
- Third place: Palestine

Tournament statistics
- Matches played: 9
- Goals scored: 24 (2.67 per match)
- Top scorer(s): (Jordan) Kinda Al-Titi (3 goals)
- Best player: (Jordan) Hala Marar
- Best goalkeeper: (Palestine) Mirave Marouf

The 2024 WAFF U-18 Girls Championship (Arabic: بطولة اتحاد غرب آسيا الرابعة للشابات) was the 4th edition of the WAFF U-18 Girls Championship, the international women's football youth championship of Western Asia organized by the West Asian Football Federation (WAFF) for the women's under-18 national teams. It was held in Aqaba, Jordan from 28 November to 6 December 2024.

Lebanon were the two-time defending champions, having won the previous two editions held in Bahrain and on home soil.

== Participation ==
=== Participating teams ===
Initially, six (out of 12) WAFF nations were set to enter the final tournament. However Kuwait withdrew prior to the draw reducing the number of teams to five. Saudi Arabia are set to make their tournament debut, marking their first competitive competition.

Country	App.	Previous best performance
Jordan	4th	Champions (2018)
Lebanon	4th	Champions (2019, 2022)
Palestine	3rd	Third place (2018)
Saudi Arabia	1st	Debut
Syria	2nd	Runners-up (2022)

Did not enter

- Bahrain
- Iraq
- Kuwait (W)
- Oman
- Qatar
- United Arab Emirates
- Yemen

=== Draw ===
The official tournament draw to determine the positions of the participating teams was held on 12 November 2024 at 12:00 AST (UTC+3) and streamed live on the federation's YouTube channel.

The draw resulted in the following positions:

Pos	Team
A1	Jordan
A2	Palestine
A3	Syria
A4	Saudi Arabia
A5	Lebanon

Players born between 1 January 2006 and 31 December 2009 were eligible to compete in the tournament.

== Main tournament ==
All times are local, AST (UTC+3).

=== Standings ===
Pos	Team	Pld	W	D	L	GF	GA	GD	Pts	Final result
1	Jordan (H)	3	2	1	0	4	2	+2	7	Champions
2	Lebanon	3	1	2	0	6	2	+4	5	Runners-up
3	Palestine	3	1	1	1	3	3	0	4	Third place
4	Saudi Arabia	3	0	0	3	2	8	−6	0	Fourth place
5	Syria	0	0	0	0	0	0	0	0	Withdrew

Source: [ WAFF]
Rules for classification: 1) Points; 2) head-to-head matches; 3) Goal difference; 4) Number of goals scored.
(H) Hosts

=== Matches ===
28 November 2024
16:00

Palestine	2–1	Saudi Arabia
Abu Asfar 42', 90+3'	Report (PFA); Report (WAFF)	Al-Shnaifi 74'

Aqaba Stadium, Aqaba
Referee: Haneen Murad (Jordan)
28 November 2024
19:00

Jordan	1–1	Lebanon
Marar 82' (pen.)	Report (JFA); Report (LFA); Report (WAFF)	Abdine 24'

Aqaba Stadium, Aqaba
Referee: Baraa Abu Aisha (Palestine)

30 November 2024
16:00

Lebanon	Voided (0–3)	Syria
	Report (LFA); Report (WAFF)	Alloush 9', 39'; Ibrahim 14'

Aqaba Stadium, Aqaba
Referee: Esraa Al-Mbaiden (Jordan)
30 November 2024
19:00

Saudi Arabia	1–2	Jordan
Balkhudher 43'	Report (JFA); Report (WAFF)	Al-Titi 3', 65'

Aqaba Stadium, Aqaba
Referee: Alesar Baddour (Syria)

2 December 2024
16:00

Syria	Voided (3–1)	Palestine
Mohammed 25'; Kassis 35' (o.g.); Amer 48'	Report (WAFF)	Abdeen 55'

Aqaba Stadium, Aqaba
Referee: Doumouh Al Bakkar (Lebanon)
2 December 2024
19:00

Lebanon	4–0	Saudi Arabia
Khazem 7'; El Hage Ali 30'; Kanaan 57', 62'	Report (LFA); Report (WAFF)

Aqaba Stadium, Aqaba
Referee: Yasmin Nairoukh (Palestine)

4 December 2024
16:00

Palestine	1–1	Lebanon
Barakat 45'	Report (WAFF)	Hasno 7'

Aqaba Stadium, Aqaba
Referee: Haneen Murad (Jordan)
4 December 2024
19:00

Syria	Voided (0–2)	Jordan
	Report (WAFF)	Abu Ali 34'; Batayneh 84'

Aqaba Stadium, Aqaba
Referee: Baraa Abu Aisha (Palestine)

6 December 2024
16:00

Saudi Arabia	Canceled (Note: The West Asian Football Federation received a letter from the Syrian Football Association prior to the matchday, apologizing for their withdrawal from the championship due to prevailing circumstances related to the ongoing Northwestern Syria offensive. Consequently, the match was canceled.)	Syria

Aqaba Stadium, Aqaba
6 December 2024
19:00

Jordan	1–0	Palestine
Al-Titi 67'

Aqaba Stadium, Aqaba
Referee: Doumouh Al Bakkar (Lebanon)

== Goalscorers ==
There were 24 goals scored in 9 matches, for an average of 2.67 goals per match.

3 goals

- (Jordan) Kinda Al-Titi

2 goals

- (Lebanon) Tatianna Kanaan
- (Palestine) Narin Abu Asfar
- (Syria) Mayar Alloush

1 goal

- (Jordan) Haya Abu Ali
- (Jordan) Arwa Batayneh
- (Jordan) Hala Marar
- (Lebanon) Lama Abdine
- (Lebanon) Leah El Hage Ali
- (Lebanon) Sherine Hasno
- (Lebanon) Luna Khazem
- (Palestine) Dina Abdeen
- (Palestine) Malak Barakat
- (Saudi Arabia) Basmah Al-Shnaifi
- (Saudi Arabia) Lamar Balkhudher
- (Syria) Shahd Amer
- (Syria) Lilas Ibrahim
- (Syria) Aya Mohammed

1 own goal

- (Palestine) Pia Kassis (against Syria)

Source: WAFF
