= Joya-Maria Azzi =

Lebanese footballer (born 2000)

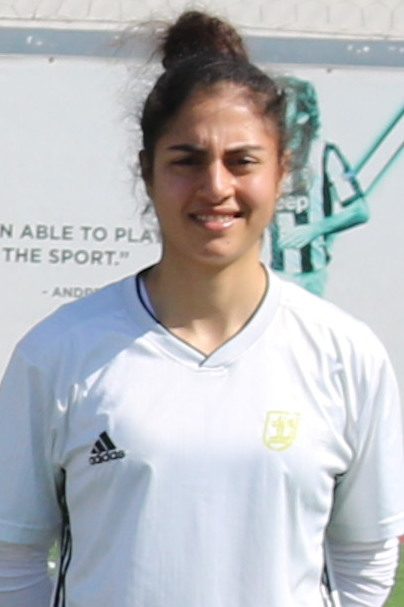
- Azzi with EFP in 2021

Personal information
- Full name: Joya-Maria Maroun Azzi
- Date of birth: 23 September 2000 (age 26)
- Place of birth: Ajaltoun, Lebanon
- Height: 1.62 m (5 ft 4 in)
- Positions: Defensive midfielder; left-back

Team information
- Current team: EFP

Youth career
- 2013–2019: Zouk Mosbeh
- 2019–2020: EFP

College career
Years	Team	Apps	(Gls)
2021–2023	Central Methodist Eagles	17	(0)

Senior career*
Years	Team	Apps	(Gls)
2017–2019	Zouk Mosbeh		
2019–2021	EFP		(2)
2022	Iowa Raptors FC		(1)
2023	San Francisco Nighthawks		(1)
2024–2025	Missouri Reign		(0)
2025–2026	EFP	8	(4)
2026–	Jounieh	1	(1)

International career^{‡}
2018–2019	Lebanon U19	6	(0)
2018–	Lebanon	14	(1)
Medal record
Women's football
Representing Lebanon
WAFF Women's Championship
Bronze medal – third place	2019
WAFF U-18 Women's Championship
Silver medal – second place	2018	U-18 Team
- * Club domestic league appearances and goals as of 27 September 2026 ‡ National team caps and goals as of 13 October 2026

Joya-Maria Maroun Azzi (Arabic: جويا ماريا مارون قزي; born 23 September 2000) is a Lebanese footballer who plays as a defensive midfielder or left-back for Lebanese club EFP and the Lebanon national team.

== Early life ==
Born in Ajaltoun, Lebanon, Azzi grew up in Okaibe, where she began playing football aged four. She initially played with local boys teams, before playing futsal with her high school team aged 13.

== Club career ==
=== Early career ===
Azzi joined her first girls football team at 14 years old, when she moved to Zouk Mosbeh. She then played for the under-17s and under-18s, before making her senior debut in the Lebanese Women's Football League. Aged 18, she moved to EFP, playing for both their under-19 and senior teams. Azzi played two years for EFP.

=== Move to the United States ===
==== Central Methodist Eagles ====
On 3 August 2021, Azzi joined the Central Methodist Eagles, the team of the Central Methodist University. She made her debut on 25 August, as a 60th-minute substitute in a 4–0 win against the William Woods Owls.

Azzi played 11 regular season games, and helped her team finish as both league and tournament champions of the 2021 Heart of America Athletic Conference Tournament. She also finished semi-finalist of the NAIA Women's Soccer Championship.

Azzi played 17 games throughout three seasons (2021–22, 2022–23, 2023–24) for the side, providing one assist.

==== Women's Premier Soccer League ====
On 28 March 2022, Azzi moved to Iowa Raptors FC in the Women's Premier Soccer League (WPSL). She was listed in the 2022 WPSL All-Conference Best XI.

Azzi joined San Francisco Nighthawks ahead of the 2023 WPSL season.

On 30 April 2024, Azzi joined Missouri Reign for the 2024 WPSL season. She re-signed for the club on 26 April 2025, taking part in her fourth WPSL season in 2025.

=== Return to EFP ===
On 5 November 2025, Azzi returned to EFP ahead of the 2025–26 Lebanese Women's Football League.

== International career ==
In 2018, Azzi was called up to play for the Lebanon national under-19 team, playing eight games. She got her first call up to the senior team in 2018. Azzi was called up to represent Lebanon at the 2022 WAFF Women's Championship; she helped her side finish runners-up, scoring a goal against Syria on 4 September.

== Personal life ==
Azzi grew up attending Marist College of Our Lady of Lourdes in Byblos, Lebanon. She graduated from the Central Methodist University in 2024.

== Career statistics ==
=== International ===
Scores and results list Lebanon's goal tally first, score column indicates score after each Azzi goal.

List of international goals scored by Joya-Maria Azzi
No.	Date	Venue	Opponent	Score	Result	Competition
1	4 September 2022	Petra Stadium, Amman, Jordan	Syria	2–0	5–2	2022 WAFF Championship

== Honours ==
Zouk Mosbeh

- Lebanese Women's Football League: 2017–18
- Lebanese Women's FA Cup: 2017–18
- Lebanese Women's Super Cup: 2017, 2018

EFP

- Lebanese Women's FA Cup: 2020–21

Central Methodist Eagles

- Heart of America Athletic Conference league champion: 2021
- Heart of America Athletic Conference tournament champion: 2021

Lebanon U18

- WAFF U-18 Women's Championship runner-up: 2018

Lebanon

- WAFF Women's Championship third place: 2019

== See also ==
- List of Lebanon women's international footballers
