= Mooi =

Mooi may refer to:

== People ==
- Bertus Mooi Wilten (1913–1965), Dutch swimmer
- C. J. de Mooi (born 1969), British celebrity
- Joya Mooi (born 1990), Dutch singer-songwriter
- Mooi Choo Chuah, Chinese engineer
- Siyakholwa Mooi

== Places ==
- Mooi River (town), South Africa
- Mooi River (Tugela), South Africa
- Mooi River (Vaal), South Africa

== Other ==
- Mooi, song by Marco Borsato
