= United Arab Emirates women's national under-20 football team =

Women's national association football team representing United Arab Emirates

United Arab Emirates Women's U-20
- Association: UAEFA
- Confederation: AFC (Asia)
- Sub-confederation: WAFF (West Asia)
- Head coach: (Syria) Azzam Ghotok
- Captain: Salha Obaid
- FIFA code: UAE
First colours	Second colours

First international
- United Arab Emirates 1–2 Kyrgyzstan (Bishkek, Kyrgyzstan; 20 October 2018)

Biggest win
- United Arab Emirates 19–0 Maldives (Bishkek, Kyrgyzstan; 22 October 2018)

Biggest defeat
- United Arab Emirates 1–3 Uzbekistan (Bishkek, Kyrgyzstan; 26 October 2018)

AFC U-20 Women's Asian Cup
- Appearances: 0

WAFF U-18 Girls Championship
- Appearances: 1 (first in 2019)
- Best result: Fifth-place (2019)

FIFA U-20 Women's World Cup
- Appearances: DNQ

The United Arab Emirates women's national under-20 football team represents United Arab Emirates in women's association football at the age of U-20 women's and is run by the United Arab Emirates Football Association (UAEFA). Its competes AFC U-20 Women's Asian Cup. The team yet to qualified FIFA U-20 Women's World Cup.

== History ==
The United Arab Emirates women's national under-20 football team played their debut game on 20 October 2018 versus Kyrgyzstan at Bishkek, Kyrgyzstan, which they won by 1–2 goals. The nation has not yet qualified to the AFC U-20 Women's Asian Cup or the FIFA U-20 Women's World Cup.

== Current squad ==
The following squad were named for 2019 AFC U-19 Women's Championship qualification.

As of 5 November 2022

No.	Pos.	Player	Date of birth (age)	Caps	Goals	Club
1	GK	Huda Hossain	6 May 2003	0	0	(United Arab Emirates Football Association)
2	FW	Layla Al Mheiri	5 February 2002	0	0	(United Arab Emirates Football Association)
3	DF	Muna Hussain	19 May 2003	0	0	(United Arab Emirates Football Association)
4	DF	Fatema Ghulam	26 November 2003	0	0	(United Arab Emirates Football Association)
5	MF	Aalya Humaid	30 September 2003	0	0	(United Arab Emirates Football Association)
6	DF	Salha Obaid (Captain)	26 December 2003	0	0	(United Arab Emirates Football Association)
7	FW	Mouza Al Mesmari	6 June 2003	0	0	(United Arab Emirates Football Association)
8	DF	Fatima Al Noobi	4 May 2002	0	0	(United Arab Emirates Football Association)
9	DF	Rawan Al Hammadi	28 September 2003	0	0	(United Arab Emirates Football Association)
10	MF	Shahd Khaled	29 August 2003	0	0	(United Arab Emirates Football Association)
11	FW	Alanoud Khaled	12 January 2003	0	0	(United Arab Emirates Football Association)
12	MF	Haya Al Suwaidi	16 July 2004	0	0	(United Arab Emirates Football Association)
13	DF	Eidah Jamal	4 August 2003	0	0	(United Arab Emirates Football Association)
14	MF	Salama Mohammad	30 November 2003	0	0	(United Arab Emirates Football Association)
15	DF	Fatima Jassem	3 September 2003	0	0	(United Arab Emirates Football Association)
16	DF	Sara Nouabi	23 May 2004	0	0	(United Arab Emirates Football Association)
17	GK	Zara Ahmed	19 January 2003	0	0	(United Arab Emirates Football Association)
18	DF	Shaikha Mohamed	28 January 2003	0	0	(United Arab Emirates Football Association)
19	FW	Sendya Gharib	17 June 2003	0	0	(United Arab Emirates Football Association)
20	MF	Ghanima Obaid	4 May 2003	0	0	(United Arab Emirates Football Association)
21	MF	Reem Al Mahri	22 February 2003	0	0	(United Arab Emirates Football Association)
22	GK	Maha Al Blooshi	5 December 2003	0	0	(United Arab Emirates Football Association)
23	MF	Shaikha Saeed	12 June 2003	0	0	(United Arab Emirates Football Association)

== Fixtures and results ==
Legend

Win Draw Loss Fixture

== Competitive record ==
=== FIFA U-20 Women's World Cup ===
FIFA U-20 Women's World Cup record
Host	Result	Position	Pld	W	D	L	GF	GA
(Canada) 2002	Did not qualify							
(Thailand) 2004	Did not qualify							
(Russia) 2006	Did not qualify							
(Chile) 2008	Did not qualify							
(Germany) 2010	Did not qualify							
(Japan) 2012	Did not qualify							
(Canada) 2014	Did not qualify							
(Papua New Guinea) 2016	Did not qualify							
(France) 2018	Did not qualify							
(Costa Rica) 2022	Did not qualify							
(Colombia) 2024	Did not qualify							
(Poland) 2026	to be determined							
Total	0/12	0 Titles	0	0	0	0	0	0

*Draws include knock-out matches decided on penalty kicks.

=== AFC U-20 Women's Asian Cup ===
AFC U-20 Women's Asian Cup record
Host	Result	Position	Pld	W	D	L	GF	GA
(India) 2002	Did not qualify							
(China) 2004	Did not qualify							
(Malaysia) 2006	Did not qualify							
(China) 2007	Did not qualify							
(China) 2009	Did not qualify							
(Vietnam) 2011	Did not qualify							
(China) 2013	Did not qualify							
(China) 2015	Did not qualify							
(China) 2017	Did not qualify							
(Thailand) 2019	Did not qualify							
(Uzbekistan) ~~2022~~	Cancelled							
(Uzbekistan) 2024	Did not qualify							
Total	2/11	0 Titles	6	0	0	6	0	54

=== AFC U-20 Women's Asian Cup qualification ===
AFC U-20 Women's Asian Cup qualification record
Hosts / Year	Result	GP	W	D	L	GS	GA
(India) 2002	Did not qualify						
(China) 2004	Did not qualify						
(Malaysia) 2006	Did Not Participate						
(China) 2007	Did not qualify						
(China) 2009	Did Not Participate						
(Vietnam) 2011	Did Not Participate						
(China) 2013	Did Not Participate						
(China) 2015	Did Not Participate						
(China) 2017	Did Not Participate						
(Thailand) 2019	DNQ	4	2	0	2	22	5
(Uzbekistan) ~~2022~~	Cancelled						
(Uzbekistan) 2024	To be determined						
Total	1/10	4	2	0	2	22	5

=== WAFF U-18 Girls Championship ===
WAFF U-18 Girls Championship record
Host	Result	Position	Pld	W	D	L	GF	GA
(Lebanon) 2018	Did not qualify							
(Bahrain) 2019	Fifth-place	–	4	2	1	1	7	5
(Lebanon) 2022	Did not qualify							
Total	1/3	–	4	2	1	1	7	5
