= Palestine women's national under-20 football team =

Palestine
- Nickname: الفدائيات
- Association: Palestinian Football Association
- Confederation: AFC (Asia)
- Sub-confederation: WAFF (West Asia)
- Head coach: Jina Khannouf
- Home stadium: Various
- FIFA code: PLE

First international
- Jordan 8–0 Palestine (Amman, Jordan; 18 October 2012)

Biggest win
- Palestine 9–0 Kuwait (Aqaba, Jordan; 6 April 2025)

Biggest defeat
- Myanmar 10–0 Palestine (Yangon, Myanmar; 20 December 2016)

The Palestine women's national under-20 football team, colloquially known as "The Redeemers" (Arabic: الفدائيات), is the official national team that represents Palestine in football for young women. The team is controlled by the Palestinian Football Association. It is sometimes referred to as the under-19 or under-18 national team.

While team has never qualified for the FIFA U-20 Women's World Cup or the AFC U-20 Women's Asian Cup, it has won the WAFF U-20 Girls Championship in 2025.

== History ==
The women's national team played its first competitive match against Jordan on 18 October 2012 during the Asian Cup qualifiers. It ended with an 8–0 loss. They lost to Iran by the same margin in the following game, and they tied Tajikistan 2–2 in the penultimate game to earn Palestine its first-ever point. By goal differential versus Tajikistan, Palestine came in bottom.

== Current squad ==
The following 21 players were selected for the 2024 WAFF U-18 Girls Championship in Aqaba, Jordan.

No.	Pos.	Player	Date of birth (age)	Club
		Layana Abou Zarzour		
		Najwa Sabagh		(Palestinian Football Association) Serreyyeh
		Tala Alali		
		Hala Balbaisi		(Palestinian Football Association) Serreyyeh
11	FW	Miral Qassis	22 July 2006 (age 20)	(Egyptian Football Association) Zamalek
9		Rand Halawani		
4		Rein Maliha		(Palestinian Football Association) Serreyyeh
		Tala Qirsh		(Palestinian Football Association) Serreyyeh
		Reham Ghrouf		
12		Selina Ghneim		
		Laurena Naber		
14		Saba Elzamamiri	15 January 2007 (age 19)	
6	FW	Narin Abu Asfar	12 January 2008 (age 18)	(Swedish Football Association) Rosengård
10	MF	Rania Sansur	24 April 2006 (age 20)	(Football Federation of Chile) Audax Italiano
7	MF	Dina Abdeen	21 November 2006 (age 19)	(United States Soccer Federation) South County
		Farah Shaheen		(Jordan Football Association) Petra Club
8		Malak Barakat	16 March 2006 (age 20)	(Jordan Football Association) Nashama Al-Mustaqbal
20		Pia Kassis	26 September 2008 (age 18)	(Lebanese Football Association) Eleven Football Pro
1	GK	Mirave Marouf		
		Yara Mansour		

== Competitive record ==
=== FIFA U-20 Women's World Cup ===
FIFA U-20 Women's World Cup record										Qualification record						
Host nation(s) and year	Round	Pos	Pld	W	D	L	GF	GA	Squad	Outcome	Pld	W	D	L	GF	GA
(Canada) 2002	Did not enter									Did not enter						
(Thailand) 2004	Did not enter									Did not enter						
(Russia) 2006	Did not enter									Did not enter						
(Chile) 2008	Did not enter									Did not enter						
(Germany) 2010	Did not enter									Did not enter						
(Japan) 2012	Did not enter									Did not enter						
(Canada) 2014	Did not qualify									The 2013 AFC U-19 Women's Championship served as the qualifying tournament						
(Papua New Guinea) 2016	Did not qualify									The 2015 AFC U-19 Women's Championship served as the qualifying tournament						
(France) 2018	Did not qualify									The 2017 AFC U-19 Women's Championship served as the qualifying tournament						
(Costa Rica) 2022	Withdrew									Withdrew						
(Colombia) 2024	Did not qualify									The 2024 AFC U-20 Women's Asian Cup served as the qualifying tournament						
(Poland) 2026	Did not qualify									The 2026 AFC U-20 Women's Asian Cup will serve as the qualifying tournament						
Total	–	0/12	–	–	–	–	–	–	–	Total	–	–	–	–	–	–

=== AFC U-20 Women's Asian Cup ===
AFC U-20 Women's Asian Cup record										Qualification record						
Host nation(s) and year	Round	Pos	Pld	W	D	L	GF	GA	Squad	Outcome	Pld	W	D	L	GF	GA
(India) 2002	Did not enter									Did not enter						
(China) 2004	Did not enter									Did not enter						
(Malaysia) 2006	Did not enter									Did not enter						
(China) 2007	Did not enter									Did not enter						
(China) 2009	Did not enter									Did not enter						
(Vietnam) 2011	Did not enter									Did not enter						
(China) 2013	Did not qualify									4th of 4	3	0	1	2	2	18
(China) 2015	Did not qualify									3rd of 3	2	0	1	1	0	6
(China) 2017	Did not qualify									4th of 4	3	0	0	3	0	25
(Thailand) 2019	Withdrew									Withdrew						
(Uzbekistan) 2024	Did not qualify									2nd of 3	2	1	0	1	3	7
(Thailand) 2026	To be determined															
Total	–	0/11	–	–	–	–	–	–	–	Total	10	1	2	7	5	56

=== WAFF U-18 Girls Championship ===
WAFF U-18 Girls Championship record
Host nation(s) and year	Round	Pos	Pld	W	D	L	GF	GA
(Lebanon) 2018	Third-place	3rd of 3	2	0	0	2	1	7
(Bahrain) 2019	Fourth-place	4th of 7	4	1	0	3	10	9
(Lebanon) 2022	Withdrew							
(Jordan) 2024	Third-place	3rd of 4	3	1	1	1	3	3
(Jordan) 2025	Champions	1st of 4	4	1	2	1	8	4
Total	Best: Champions	4/5	13	3	3	7	22	23

== See also ==
- Palestine women's national football team
- Palestine women's national under-17 football team
- Palestine national under-20 football team
- Women's football in Palestine
- Football in Palestine
