= Leen Al-Btoush =

Jordanian footballer

Personal information
- Full name: Leen Yasin Mohammad Al-Btoush
- Date of birth: 20 July 2001 (age 25)
- Place of birth: Amman, Jordan
- Height: 1.54 m (5 ft 1 in)
- Position: Forward

Youth career
- Amman

International career^{‡}
Years	Team	Apps	(Gls)
2012	Jordan U13		(0)
2013–2015	Jordan U14		(28)
2013–2015	Jordan U16		(1)
2016	Jordan U17	2	(0)
2018	Jordan U19	3	(4)
2017–	Jordan	34	(2)
- ‡ National team caps and goals as of 8 April 2025

Leen Yasin Mohammad Al-Btoush (Arabic: لين البطوش; born 20 July 2001) is a Jordanian footballer who plays as a forward for the Jordan national team.
