= Marist College of Our Lady of Lourdes =

Coordinates: 34°8′41.21″N 35°38′47.65″E

- Amsheet, Byblos District, Lebanon

Information
- Type: Marist Brothers, Catholic
- Established: 1903; 123 years ago
- Principal: Nada Rizk
- Grades: Primary through baccalauréat
- Gender: Coeducational
- Website: LourdesMaristCollege

Marist College of Our Lady of Lourdes (Collège Notre Dame de Lourdes des Frères Maristes) is a comprehensive school, primary through baccalauréat, run by the Catholic Marist Brothers in the Byblos District northeast of Beirut, Lebanon. It traces its roots to a Marist training center opened in Amsheet town in Lebanon in 1903.
