= Syria women's national under-20 football team =

Syria women's national football team

Syria under-20
- Nickname(s): Nosour Qasioun (Arabic: نسور قاسيون, lit. 'Qasioun Eagles')
- Association: Syrian Football Association (SFA)
- Confederation: AFC (Asia)
- Sub-confederation: WAFF (West Asia)
- Head coach: Salim Jablawi
- Captain: Mayar Alloush
- Top scorer: Hayat Dayoub (3)
- Home stadium: Various
- FIFA code: SYR
First colours	Second colours

First international
- Jordan 3–4 Syria (Jounieh, Lebanon; 19 October 2022)

Biggest win
- Syria 7–1 Kuwait (Aqaba, Jordan; 12 April 2025)

Biggest defeat
- China 6–0 Syria (Yinchuan, China; 6 August 2025)

WAFF U-18 Girls Championship
- Appearances: 1 (first in 2022)
- Best result: Runners-up (2022)
Medal record
Women's football
WAFF U-18 Girls Championship
Silver medal – second place	2022 Lebanon	Team

The Syria women's national under-20 football team (Arabic: منتخب سوريا لكرة القدم للسيدات تحت 20 سنة), colloquially known as Qasioun Eagles represents Syria in international women's youth football. The team is controlled by the Syrian Football Association (SFA), the governing body for football in Syria. The team also serves as the women's national under-19 and women's national under-18 teams of Syria.

While the team has never participated in either the FIFA U-20 Women's World Cup or the AFC U-20 Women's Asian Cup, they have participated on WAFF U-18 Girls Championship, and were runners-up in 2022.

== Competitive record ==
=== FIFA U-20 Women's World Cup ===
FIFA U-20 Women's World Cup record										Qualification record						
Host nation(s) and year	Round	Pos	Pld	W	D	L	GF	GA	Squad	Outcome	Pld	W	D	L	GF	GA
(Canada) 2002	Did not enter									Did not enter						
(Thailand) 2004	Did not enter									Did not enter						
(Russia) 2006	Did not enter									Did not enter						
(Chile) 2008	Did not enter									Did not enter						
(Germany) 2010	Did not enter									Did not enter						
(Japan) 2012	Did not enter									Did not enter						
(Canada) 2014	Did not enter									Did not enter						
(Papua New Guinea) 2016	Did not enter									Did not enter						
(France) 2018	Did not enter									Did not enter						
(Costa Rica) 2022	Did not qualify									The 2022 AFC U-20 Women's Asian Cup would have served as the qualifying tournament						
(Colombia) 2024	Did not qualify									The 2024 AFC U-20 Women's Asian Cup served as the qualifying tournament						
(Poland) 2026	Did not qualify									The 2026 AFC U-20 Women's Asian Cup will serve as the qualifying tournament						
Total	–	0/12	–	–	–	–	–	–	–	Total	–	–	–	–	–	–

=== AFC U-20 Women's Asian Cup ===
AFC U-20 Women's Asian Cup record											Qualification record						
Host nation(s) and year	Round	Pos	Pld	W	D	L	GF	GA	Squad		Outcome	Pld	W	D	L	GF	GA
(India) 2002	Did not enter										Did not enter						
(China) 2004	Did not enter										Did not enter						
(Malaysia) 2006	Did not enter										Did not enter						
(China) 2007	Did not enter										Did not enter						
(China) 2009	Did not enter										Did not enter						
(Vietnam) 2011	Did not enter										Did not enter						
(China) 2013	Did not enter										Did not enter						
(China) 2015	Did not enter										Did not enter						
(China) 2017	Did not enter										Did not enter						
(Thailand) 2019	Did not enter										Did not enter						
(Uzbekistan) 2024	Did not enter										Did not enter						
(Thailand) 2026	Did not qualify										Did not qualify						
Total	–	0/10	–	–	–	–	–	–	–	Total	–	–	–	–	–	–	

=== WAFF U-18 Girls Championship ===
WAFF U-18 Girls Championship record
Host(s) and year	Round	Pos	Pld	W	D	L	GF	GA
(Lebanon) 2018	Did not enter							
(Bahrain) 2019	Did not enter							
(Lebanon) 2022	Runners-up	2nd of 4	4	2	0	2	8	10
Total	Best: runners-up	1/3	4	2	0	2	8	10

== Recent results and matches ==
Legend

Win Draw Lose Fixture

== Coaching staff ==
=== Current coaching staff ===
As of 21 October 2022

Position	Name
Head coach	(Syria) Salim Jablawi
Assistant coach	Maha Katrib
Assistant coach	Basma Al Ali
Assistant coach	Eva Ghazi
Team manager	Nancy Muammar
Goalkeeping coach	Fida Darwish
Fitness coach	(Syria) Bayan Makdah
Kit manager	Reham Abdul Rahman

== Players ==
=== Current squad ===
The following players were called up for the 2022 WAFF U-18 Girls Championship.

No.	Pos.	Player	Date of birth (age)	Club
22	GK	Raneem Abo Latif		
1		Etedal Hamdan		
2		Maes Al Halabi		
3		Doha Al Melhem		
4		Mae Al Jany		
6		Saba Sleem		
8		Tala Noureddin		
9		Seant Omar		
10		Hayat Dayoub		
11		Aya Mohammad		
12		Aheen Mohammad		
15		Larisa Nader		
14		Karis Jarbou		
15		Fatima Al Abdullah		
16		Bariana Asmar		
17		Sedra Khezhan		
18		Dlnai Ismail		
19		Sham Jamal		
20		Omama Othman		
21		Shatha Arabi		
23		Kristen Hanouch		

=== Recent call-ups ===
The following footballers were part of a national selection in the past 12 months, but are not part of the current squad.

Pos.	Player	Date of birth (age)	Caps	Goals	Club	Latest call-up

== Player records ==
=== Top scorers ===
#	Player	Period	Goals
1	Hayat Dayoub	2022–present	3
2	Tala Noureddin	2022–present	2
3	Aya Mohammad	2022–present	1
3	Karis Jarbou	2022–present	1
3	Roaa Gharib	2022–present	1

As of 25 October 2022. Highlighted names denote a player still playing or available for selection.

== Honours ==
=== Regional ===
- WAFF U-18 Girls Championship

2nd place: 2022

== See also ==
- Syria women's national football team
- Syria national under-20 football team
- Football in Syria
