= Joya (drink) =

Mexican fruit soda brand owned by The Coca-Cola Company

Joya (English: "jewel") is a brand of fruit sodas introduced in 1942 in Monterrey, Mexico by mineral water producers Cia. Topo Chico (now a division of Embotelladoras Arca, the second largest Coca-Cola bottling group in Mexico) Joya was available only in the Mexican states of Nuevo Leon and the north of Tamaulipas; then, in 2004, Joya distribution started in Coahuila, and part of San Luis Potosí, and in 2005 in Sinaloa, Chihuahua and Baja California. In 2004 Joya was acquired by The Coca-Cola Company, and in 2006 Joya was introduced in Hidalgo, part of Morelos and part of Puebla .

== Flavors ==
- Fruit Punch
- Apple
- Grapefruit
- Pineapple
- Grape
- Tangerine
- Peach
- Lemon
- Tamarind
- Strawberry
