= Hà Thị Nhài =

Vietnamese footballer

Personal information
- Date of birth: 15 March 1998 (age 28)
- Place of birth: Tân Uyên, Lai Châu, Vietnam
- Height: 1.57 m (5 ft 2 in)
- Position: Midfielder

Team information
- Current team: Than Khoáng Sản
- Number: 27

Senior career*
Years	Team	Apps	(Gls)
2015–2019	Sơn La	35	(3)
2020–	Than Khoáng Sản	17	(0)

International career^{‡}
2018–	Vietnam	7	(0)
- * Club domestic league appearances and goals ‡ National team caps and goals as of 24 August 2018

Hà Thị Nhài (born 15 March 1998) is a Vietnamese footballer who plays as a midfielder for Women's Championship club Than Khoáng Sản. She has been a member of the Vietnam women's national team.
