= Joya Mooi =

- Born: 9 December 1990 (age 35)
- Genres: Jazz; neo-soul; R&B; dream pop
- Instrument: Vocals
- Years active: 2010–present
- Website: www.joyamooi.com

Joya Mooi (born 9 December 1990) is a Dutch singer-songwriter and producer.

== Early life ==
Mooi was born to a South African Tswana father from Soweto and a Dutch mother. Her father was a member of the African National Congress (ANC) and fled the Apartheid government to Angola, where her mother was working at a hospital. Mooi's three older siblings were born there before the family moved to the Netherlands, settling in Deventer. At age 15, Mooi began studying jazz music at the ArtEZ Conservatorium.

== Career ==
Mooi's debut album Hard melk was released in 2010. Produced by Kubus, she was commissioned to create a soundtrack for a reprint of the novel Lord of the Barnyard by Tristan Egolf. As the reprint plans fell through, Mooi and Kubus decided to release the songs they had written for it as an EP titled Mister Sinister in 2011. In 2013, Mooi's second jazz album Crystal Growth, which Mooi produced herself with Dennis Maks. She embarked on her first headline tour dates in 2014.

While mourning the loss of her brother in 2014, Mooi took a hiatus off from releasing music. She returned in 2017 with her third album The Waiting Room, dedicated to her brother, much of it written for solace in the last few months of his life in the titular waiting room at the hospital. Mooi's fourth album The Ease of Others, released in 2019, muses on her identity, multiculturalism, and her father's history in South Africa. It was produced by Blazehoven and Sim Fane. This was followed by the EP Blossom Carefully the following year. Mooi was named a 2020 3FM Talent by NPO 3FM.

After the COVID-19 lockdown, Mooi released the singles "Remember", "My Favourite" and "Most Frail" in 2021. She supported Benny Sings on tour, traveling around South Africa and the Netherlands, and performed at the Motel Mozaïque and Valkhof Festival. Over 2022 and 2023, Mooi released the double-album What's Around the Corner. She collaborated with the Mauritshuis on the 2023 track "Black Horses", based on the Rembrandt van Rijn painting Twee Afrikaanse mannen. In 2024, Mooi released the singles "Don't Count Me In", "Don't Answer" and "Poster Child", and the EP Open Hearts, which she collaborated on with Johannesburg-based duo Easy Freak and Bastian Langebaek.

== Artistry ==
Mooi grew up with and began her career focused on jazz, including standard, Bebop, bossa nova and Angolese Semba. She learned saxophone at a young age and also drew upon her South African heritage. As her music progressed through the years, she increasingly incorporated other influences, including neo-soul and R&B, as well as dream pop and indie. In her youth, her parents would played Abdullah Ibrahim, Alice Coltrane, Oscar Peterson and Ella Fitzgerald. Mooi also listened to Etta James and Georgia Anne Muldrow. Other artists she has named include contemporary Nana Adjoa and Beach House, SZA and Spellling.

== Discography ==
=== Albums ===
- Hard melk (2010)
- Crystal Growth (2013)
- The Waiting Room (2017)
- The Ease of Others (2019)
- What's Around The Corner (2022–2023), double-album

=== EPs ===
- Mister Sinister (2011)
- Blossom Carefully (2020)
- Open Hearts (2024)

=== Singles ===
- "Remember" (2021)
- "My Favourite" (2021)
- "Most Frail" (2021)
- "Don't Count Me In" (2024)
- "Don't Answer" (2024)
- "Poster Child" (2024)
- "Technicolour" (2025), feat Ric Wilson
- "Lookalike" (2026)
- "Only Water" (2026), feat Lady Donli
