= 2017 AFC U-19 Women's Championship =

2017亚足联U19女子锦标赛

Tournament details
- Host country: China
- Dates: 15–28 October
- Teams: 8 (from 1 confederation)
- Venue: 2 (in 1 host city)

Final positions
- Champions: Japan (5th title)
- Runners-up: North Korea
- Third place: China
- Fourth place: Australia

Tournament statistics
- Matches played: 16
- Goals scored: 63 (3.94 per match)
- Attendance: 6,713 (420 per match)
- Top scorer: (North Korea) Sung Hyang-sim (6 goals)
- Best player: (North Korea) Sung Hyang-sim
- Fair play award: Japan

The 2017 AFC U-19 Women's Championship was the ninth edition of the AFC U-19 Women's Championship, the biennial international youth football tournament organised by the Asian Football Confederation (AFC) for women's under-19 national teams in Asia. The tournament was held in China for the third consecutive edition from 15 to 28 October 2017, with a total of eight teams competing.

The top three teams qualified for the 2018 FIFA U-20 Women's World Cup in France as the AFC representatives.

== Qualification ==
The draw for the qualifiers was held on 19 May 2016. Four teams qualified directly for the final tournament by their 2015 performance, while the other entrants competed in the qualifying stage for the remaining four spots. The qualifiers were held from 27 October to 6 November 2016, with Group C postponed to 20–24 December 2016 due to the death of King Bhumibol Adulyadej.

=== Qualified teams ===
The following eight teams qualified for the final tournament.

Team	Qualified as	Appearance	Previous best performance
Japan	2015 champions	9th	Champions (2002, 2009, 2011, 2015)
North Korea	2015 runners-up	9th	Champions (2007)
South Korea	2015 third place	9th	Champions (2004, 2013)
China	2015 fourth place / Hosts	9th	Champions (2006)
Australia	Group A winners	7th	Third place (2006)
Uzbekistan	Group B winners	4th	Group stage (2002, 2004, 2015)
Thailand	Group C winners	6th	Fourth place (2004)
Vietnam	Group D winners	4th	Quarter-finals (2004)

== Venues ==
The tournament was held in Nanjing, at the Jiangning Sports Center and the Jiangsu Training Base Stadium.

Nanjing
Jiangning Sports Center	Jiangsu Training Base Stadium
Capacity: 30,000	Capacity: 3,000
2017 AFC U-19 Women's Championship is located in China

== Draw ==
The draw was held on 28 April 2017, 16:00 MYT (UTC+8), at the AFC House in Kuala Lumpur, Malaysia. The eight teams were drawn into two groups of four teams. The teams were seeded according to their performance in the 2015 AFC U-19 Women's Championship final tournament and qualification, with the hosts China automatically seeded and assigned to Position A1 in the draw.

Pot 1	Pot 2	Pot 3	Pot 4
1. China (hosts); 2. Japan	3. North Korea; 4. South Korea	5. Australia; 6. Thailand	7. Uzbekistan; 8. Vietnam

== Match officials ==
A total of 8 referees and 10 assistant referees were appointed for the final tournament.

Referees

- (Australia) Kate Jacewicz
- (China) Qin Liang
- (Iran) Saltanat Noroozi
- (Japan) Kajiyama Fusako
- (Myanmar) Thein Thein Aye
- (North Korea) Ri Hyang-ok
- (South Korea) Oh Hyeon-jeong
- (Uzbekistan) Anna Sidorova

Assistant referees

- (Australia) Renae Coghill
- (China) Bao Mengxiao
- (China) Fang Yan
- (India) Uvena Fernandes
- (Iran) Ensieh Khabaz
- (Japan) Maiko Hagio
- (Japan) Naomi Teshirogi
- (North Korea) Hong Kum-Nyo
- (South Korea) Kim Kyoung-Min
- (Uzbekistan) Zilola Rahmatova

== Squads ==
Players born between 1 January 1998 and 31 December 2001 are eligible to compete in the tournament. Each team must register a squad of minimum 18 players and maximum 23 players, minimum three of whom must be goalkeepers (Regulations Articles 31.4 and 31.5).

== Group stage ==
The top two teams of each group advance to the semi-finals.

Tiebreakers

Teams are ranked according to points (3 points for a win, 1 point for a draw, 0 points for a loss), and if tied on points, the following tiebreaking criteria are applied, in the order given, to determine the rankings (Regulations Article 11.5):

1. Points in head-to-head matches among tied teams;
2. Goal difference in head-to-head matches among tied teams;
3. Goals scored in head-to-head matches among tied teams;
4. If more than two teams are tied, and after applying all head-to-head criteria above, a subset of teams are still tied, all head-to-head criteria above are reapplied exclusively to this subset of teams;
5. Goal difference in all group matches;
6. Goals scored in all group matches;
7. Penalty shoot-out if only two teams are tied and they met in the last round of the group;
8. Disciplinary points (yellow card = 1 point, red card as a result of two yellow cards = 3 points, direct red card = 3 points, yellow card followed by direct red card = 4 points);
9. Drawing of lots.

All times are local, CST (UTC+8).

=== Group A ===
Pos	Team	Pld	W	D	L	GF	GA	GD	Pts	Qualification
1	North Korea	3	3	0	0	13	0	+13	9	Knockout stage
2	China (H)	3	2	0	1	4	2	+2	6	Knockout stage
3	Uzbekistan	3	0	1	2	2	6	−4	1	
4	Thailand	3	0	1	2	2	13	−11	1	

Source: AFC
Rules for classification: Group stage tiebreakers
(H) Hosts
15 October 2017
15:00

China	2–0	Uzbekistan
Chen Yuanmeng 19'; Liu Jing 61' (pen.)	Report

Jiangning Sports Center, Nanjing
Attendance: 750
Referee: Oh Hyeon-jeong (South Korea)
15 October 2017
19:00

North Korea	9–0	Thailand
Sung Hyang-sim 12', 45+1', 47', 69'; Kim Pom-ui 19' (pen.); Ri Hae-yon 39', 64'; Ju Hyo-sim 45+2'; An Song-ok 82'	Report

Jiangning Sports Center, Nanjing
Attendance: 358
Referee: Kate Jacewicz (Australia)

18 October 2017
15:00

Thailand	0–2	China
	Report	Tipkritta 29' (o.g.); Liu Jing 72'

Jiangning Sports Center, Nanjing
Attendance: 465
Referee: Thein Thein Aye (Myanmar)
18 October 2017
19:00

Uzbekistan	0–2	North Korea
	Report	Ju Hyo-sim 9'; Kim Pom-ui 58'

Jiangning Sports Center, Nanjing
Attendance: 182
Referee: Kajiyama Fusako (Japan)

21 October 2017
15:00

China	0–2	North Korea
	Report	An Song-ok 3'; Ri Hae-yon 28'

Jiangning Sports Center, Nanjing
Attendance: 617
Referee: Kate Jacewicz (Australia)
21 October 2017
15:00

Thailand	2–2	Uzbekistan
Kanyanat 45+1'; Orrapan 71'	Report	Khabibullaeva 9', 66'

Jiangsu Training Base Stadium, Nanjing
Attendance: 40
Referee: Kajiyama Fusako (Japan)

=== Group B ===
Pos	Team	Pld	W	D	L	GF	GA	GD	Pts	Qualification
1	Japan	3	3	0	0	15	1	+14	9	Knockout stage
2	Australia	3	2	0	1	8	7	+1	6	Knockout stage
3	South Korea	3	1	0	2	5	4	+1	3	
4	Vietnam	3	0	0	3	2	18	−16	0	

Source: AFC
Rules for classification: Group stage tiebreakers
16 October 2017
15:00

South Korea	0–2	Australia
	Report	Siemsen 70'; Ibini 90+3'

Jiangsu Training Base Stadium, Nanjing
Attendance: 150
Referee: Qin Liang (China)
16 October 2017
19:00

Japan	8–0	Vietnam
Endo 3'; Ono 30'; Ueki 33'; Takarada 53', 59', 67'; Sato 57', 73'	Report

Jiangning Sports Center, Nanjing
Attendance: 285
Referee: Ri Hyang-ok (North Korea)

19 October 2017
15:00

Vietnam	0–5	South Korea
	Report	Mun Eun-ju 8'; Kim So-eun 23', 74', 85'; Kim Eun-soul 58'

Jiangsu Training Base Stadium, Nanjing
Attendance: 60
Referee: Anna Sidorova (Uzbekistan)
19 October 2017
19:00

Australia	1–5	Japan
Siemsen 13'	Report	Miyagawa 51'; Hayashi 58'; Miyazawa 66'; Takarada 72', 90+3'

Jiangning Sports Center, Nanjing
Attendance: 561
Referee: Ri Hyang-ok (North Korea)

22 October 2017
15:00

Japan	2–0	South Korea
Muraoka 49'; Kanno 81'	Report

Jiangning Sports Center, Nanjing
Attendance: 318
Referee: Qin Liang (China)
22 October 2017
15:00

Australia	5–2	Vietnam
Siemsen 5'; Lowe 13'; Chidiac 28', 69', 72'	Report	Tuyết Ngân 50'; Nhài 81'

Jiangsu Training Base Stadium, Nanjing
Attendance: 130
Referee: Thein Thein Aye (Myanmar)

== Knockout stage ==
In the knockout stage, extra time and penalty shoot-out are used to decide the winner if necessary, except for the third place match where penalty shoot-out (no extra time) is used to decide the winner.

=== Bracket ===
Semi-finals
25 October – Jiangning Stadium
North Korea	3
Australia	0
25 October – Jiangning Stadium
Japan	5
China	0

Final
28 October – Jiangning Stadium
North Korea	0
Japan	1
Third place
28 October – Jiangning Stadium
Australia	0
China	3

=== Semi-finals ===
Winners qualify for 2018 FIFA U-20 Women's World Cup.

25 October 2017
15:00

North Korea	3–0	Australia
Kim Pom-ui 9' (pen.); Sung Hyang-sim 28', 65'	Report

Jiangning Sports Center, Nanjing
Attendance: 261
Referee: Thein Thein Aye (Myanmar)

25 October 2017
19:00

Japan	5–0	China
Miyazawa 47', 48'; Chen Qiaozhu 61' (o.g.); Ueki 64'; Mehara 85'	Report

Jiangning Sports Center, Nanjing
Attendance: 780
Referee: Oh Hyeon-jeong (South Korea)

=== Third place match ===
Winner qualifies for 2018 FIFA U-20 Women's World Cup.

28 October 2017
15:00

Australia	0–3	China
	Report	He Luyao 20'; Xie Qiwen 53'; Jin Kun 54'

Jiangning Sports Center, Nanjing
Attendance: 843
Referee: Ri Hyang-ok (North Korea)

=== Final ===
28 October 2017
19:00

North Korea	0–1	Japan
	Report	Ueki 50'

Jiangning Sports Center, Nanjing
Attendance: 913
Referee: Qin Liang (China)

== Winners ==
2017 AFC U-19 Women's Championship winners

Japan
Fifth title

== Qualified teams for FIFA U-20 Women's World Cup ==
The following three teams from AFC qualified for the 2018 FIFA U-20 Women's World Cup.

Team	Qualified on	Previous appearances in FIFA U-20 Women's World Cup^{1}
Japan	25 October 2017	5 (2002, 2008, 2010, 2012, 2016)
North Korea	25 October 2017	6 (**2006**, 2008, 2010, 2012, 2014, **2016**)
China	28 October 2017	5 (2004, 2006, 2008, 2012, 2014)

^{1} Bold indicates champions for that year. Italic indicates hosts for that year.

== Awards ==
The following awards were given at the conclusion of the tournament.

Most Valuable Player	Top Scorer	Fair Play Award
(North Korea) Sung Hyang-sim	(North Korea) Sung Hyang-sim	Japan

== Goalscorers ==
6 goals

- (North Korea) Sung Hyang-sim

5 goals

- (Japan) Saori Takarada

3 goals

- (Australia) Alex Chidiac
- (Australia) Remy Siemsen
- (Japan) Hinata Miyazawa
- (Japan) Riko Ueki
- (North Korea) Kim Pom-ui
- (North Korea) Ri Hae-yon
- (South Korea) Kim So-eun

2 goals

- (China) Liu Jing
- (Japan) Mizuka Sato
- (North Korea) An Song-ok
- (North Korea) Ju Hyo-sim
- (Uzbekistan) Diyorakhon Khabibullaeva

1 goal

- (Australia) Princess Ibini
- (Australia) Rachel Lowe
- (China) Chen Yuanmeng
- (China) He Luyao
- (China) Jin Kun
- (China) Xie Qiwen
- (Japan) Jun Endo
- (Japan) Honoka Hayashi
- (Japan) Oto Kanno
- (Japan) Rina Mehara
- (Japan) Asato Miyagawa
- (Japan) Mami Muraoka
- (Japan) Nana Ono
- (South Korea) Kim Eun-soul
- (South Korea) Mun Eun-ju
- (Thailand) Orrapan Bungthong
- (Thailand) Kanyanat Chetthabutr
- (Vietnam) Hà Thị Nhài
- (Vietnam) Nguyễn Thị Tuyết Ngân

1 own goal

- (China) Chen Qiaozhu (against Japan)
- (Thailand) Tipkritta Onsamai (against China)

Source: the-afc.com Archived 27 March 2018 at the Wayback Machine
