= Jordan women's national under-20 football team =

National association football team

Jordan U-20
- Nickname(s): نشميات الأردن; Nashmeyat Al-Urdon ("The Chivalrous of Jordan")
- Association: Jordan Football Association
- Confederation: AFC (Asia)
- Sub-confederation: WAFF (West Asia)
- Head coach: Hussam Abu Raiyyash
First colours	Second colours	Third colours

First international
- Jordan 1–1 Uzbekistan (Amman, Jordan; 1 March 2006)

Biggest win
- Jordan 13–1 Singapore (Kuala Lumpur, Malaysia; 30 October 2008)

Biggest defeat
- South Korea 11–0 Jordan (Shah Alam, Malaysia; 28 October 2008)

AFC U-20 Women's Asian Cup
- Appearances: 2 (first in 2006)
- Best result: Group stage (2006, 2026)
Medal record
Women's football
WAFF U-20 Girls Championship
Gold medal – first place	2018 Lebanon
Gold medal – first place	2024 Jordan
Silver medal – second place	2025 Jordan
Bronze medal – third place	2019 Bahrain
Bronze medal – third place	2022 Lebanon

Jordan women's national under-20 football team represents Jordan in international youth football competitions.

== Results and friendlies ==
The following is a list of match results in the last 12 months, as well as any future matches that have been scheduled.

Win Draw Loss Fixture

=== 2026 ===
28 February 2026 Bee Girls Trophy	Jordan	0–1	Thailand	Antalya, Turkey
22:00		Report	Limpawanich 66'	Stadium: Emirhan Sports Complex

3 March 2026 Bee Girls Trophy	Jordan	0–3	Russia	Antalya, Turkey
22:00		Report	Petrova 12'; Denisko 21'; Kryvenko 25'	Stadium: Emirhan Sports Complex

2 April 2026 AFC U-20 Women's Asian Cup	North Korea	8–0	Jordan	Pathum Thani, Thailand
20:00	Ri Su-jong 1'; Kang Ryu-mi 4', 21', 71'; Choe Yon-a 41'; Pak Il-sim 45'; Pak Ok-i 48'; Ri Kuk-hyang 49'	Report		Stadium: Pathum Thani Stadium; Attendance: 110; Referee: Keomany Phengmeuangkhoun (Laos)

5 April 2026 AFC U-20 Women's Asian Cup	Jordan	1–2	South Korea	Nonthaburi, Thailand
16:00	Al Zurikat 51'	Report	Jin Hye-rin 41'; Lee Ha-eun 43'	Stadium: Nonthaburi Province Stadium; Attendance: 35; Referee: Ranjita Devi Teckham (India)

8 April 2026 AFC U-20 Women's Asian Cup	Uzbekistan	4–0	Jordan	Pathum Thani, Thailand
20:00	Shodieva 22'; Dekanbaeva 26'; Turgunova 44', 85'	Report		Stadium: Thammasat Stadium; Attendance: 17; Referee: Ranjita Devi Teckham (India)

10 October Friendly	Jordan	2–0	Saudi Arabia	Amman, Jordan
18:00 UTC+3	Issa 40'; Al-Rousan 81'	Report		Stadium: Polo Stadium

13 October Friendly	Jordan	1–0	Saudi Arabia	Amman, Jordan
18:00 UTC+3	Salameh 79'	Report		Stadium: Polo Stadium

26 November 2026 WAFF U-20 Girls Championship GS	Jordan	v	United Arab Emirates	Aqaba, Jordan
20:00 UTC+3				Stadium: Al-Aqaba Stadium

30 November 2026 WAFF U-20 Girls Championship GS	Jordan	v	Iraq	Aqaba, Jordan
20:00 UTC+3				Stadium: Al-Aqaba Stadium

== Current squad ==
The following 23 players were selected for the 2026 AFC U-20 Women's Asian Cup.

No.	Pos.	Player	Date of birth (age)	Club
1	GK	Cileen Seif	22 January 2008 (aged 18)	(Jordan Football Association) Amman
12	GK	Sajida Issa	16 March 2008 (aged 18)	(Jordan Football Association) Etihad Club
22	GK	Celine Shannak	26 August 2006 (aged 19)	(Jordan Football Association) Amman
2	DF	Sara Al-Zoubi	29 January 2009 (aged 17)	(United States Soccer Federation) Michigan Hawks
3	DF	Panar Shamali	12 February 2009 (aged 17)	(United States Soccer Federation) Real Jersey Futbol Academy
4	DF	Raneem Daoud	28 June 2006 (aged 19)	(Jordan Football Association) Al-Naser
20	DF	Maya Awadallah	2 January 2007 (aged 19)	(Jordan Football Association) Al-Raya
5	MF	Rayana Issa	16 May 2009 (aged 16)	(United Arab Emirates Football Association) Banaat FC
6	MF	Deanna Al-Khawaja	30 June 2008 (aged 17)	(United States Soccer Federation) Carolina Velocity
8	MF	Marah Abbaas	26 November 2006 (aged 19)	(Jordan Football Association) Amman
10	MF	Hala Marar	8 May 2007 (aged 18)	(Jordan Football Association) Etihad Club
14	MF	Lamar Ibrahim	3 February 2006 (aged 20)	(Jordan Football Association) Etihad Club
17	MF	Raghad Al-Tarawneh	17 July 2006 (aged 19)	(Jordan Football Association) Al-Naser
21	MF	Nadin Abu Salha	7 March 2010 (aged 16)	(Jordan Football Association) Amman
23	MF	Siwar Obeid	15 June 2006 (aged 19)	(Jordan Football Association) Orthodox Club
7	FW	Arwa Batayneh	20 May 2007 (aged 18)	(Jordan Football Association) Amman
9	FW	Dana Abu Hazeem	20 August 2009 (aged 16)	(Jordan Football Association) Amman
11	FW	Rama Al-Khashook	2 July 2007 (aged 18)	(Jordan Football Association) Amman
13	FW	Mira Jarrar	12 January 2009 (aged 17)	(Jordan Football Association) Etihad Club
15	FW	Alma Al-Saify	8 November 2010 (aged 15)	(Jordan Football Association) Etihad Club
16	FW	Kinda Al-Titi	11 August 2006 (aged 19)	(Jordan Football Association) Etihad Club
18	FW	Yasmeen Al Zurikat	20 May 2007 (aged 18)	(German Football Association) VfR Warbeyen
19	FW	Haya Abu Ali	3 March 2009 (aged 17)	(Jordan Football Association) Etihad Club

=== Recent call-ups ===
No.	Pos.	Player	Date of birth (age)	Club
	GK	Renata Al Badayneh		(Jordan Football Association) Etihad
	DF	Renad Shwaki		(Jordan Football Association) Al-Nasser
	DF	Mera Attari		(Jordan Football Association) Orthodox
		Afnan Hamad		
	MF	Lylia Al-Saheli		
	FW	Janna Ma'touq		(Jordan Football Association) Etihad
		Salaf Hassan		
		Maysam Al-Aqtash		(Jordan Football Association) Al-Nasser
		Ida Tamimi		(Swedish Football Association) IF Brommapojkarna
	FW	Khetam Shqair		(Jordan Football Association) Al-Nasser

== Competitive record ==
=== FIFA U-20 Women's World Cup ===
FIFA U-20 Women's World Cup record										Qualification record						
Host nation(s) and year	Round	Pos	Pld	W	D	L	GF	GA	Squad	Outcome	Pld	W	D	L	GF	GA
(Canada) 2002	Did not enter									Did not enter						
(Thailand) 2004	Did not enter									Did not enter						
(Russia) 2006	Did not qualify									The 2006 AFC U-19 Women's Championship served as the qualifying tournament						
(Chile) 2008	Did not qualify									The 2007 AFC U-19 Women's Championship served as the qualifying tournament						
(Germany) 2010	Did not qualify									The 2009 AFC U-19 Women's Championship served as the qualifying tournament						
(Japan) 2012	Did not qualify									The 2011 AFC U-19 Women's Championship served as the qualifying tournament						
(Canada) 2014	Did not qualify									The 2013 AFC U-19 Women's Championship served as the qualifying tournament						
(Papua New Guinea) 2016	Did not qualify									The 2015 AFC U-19 Women's Championship served as the qualifying tournament						
(France) 2018	Did not qualify									The 2017 AFC U-19 Women's Championship served as the qualifying tournament						
(Costa Rica) 2022	Did not qualify									The 2022 AFC U-20 Women's Asian Cup served as the qualifying tournament						
(Colombia) 2024	Did not qualify									The 2024 AFC U-20 Women's Asian Cup served as the qualifying tournament						
(Poland) 2026	Did not qualify									The 2026 AFC U-20 Women's Asian Cup served as the qualifying tournament						
Total	–	0/12	–	–	–	–	–	–	–	Total	–	–	–	–	–	–

=== AFC U-20 Women's Asian Cup ===
AFC U-20 Women's Asian Cup record										Qualification record						
Host nation(s) and year	Round	Pos	Pld	W	D	L	GF	GA	Squad	Outcome	Pld	W	D	L	GF	GA
(India) 2002	Did not enter									Did not enter						
(China) 2004	Did not enter									Did not enter						
(Malaysia) 2006	Group stage	6th	3	1	0	2	2	17	-	1st of 3	2	1	1	0	4	2
(China) 2007	Did not qualify									4th of 5	4	1	0	3	7	11
(China) 2009	Did not qualify									3rd of 6	5	2	0	3	17	21
(Vietnam) 2011	Did not qualify									3rd of 4	3	1	0	2	8	6
(China) 2013	Did not qualify									3rd of 4	6	4	0	2	15	7
(China) 2015	Did not qualify									2nd of 4	3	2	0	1	6	4
(China) 2017	Did not qualify									2nd of 3	2	1	0	1	5	7
(Thailand) 2019	Did not qualify									2nd of 4	3	2	0	1	10	5
(Uzbekistan) 2024	Did not qualify									2nd of 4	3	2	1	0	5	1
(Thailand) 2026	Group stage	12th	3	0	0	3	1	13	-	2nd of 4	2	2	1	0	15	4
Total:2/12	Group stage	6th	5	1	0	4	3	27	–	Total	33	18	3	13	92	68

=== WAFF U-20 Girls Championship ===
WAFF U-20 Girls Championship record
Host nation(s) and year	Round	Pos	Pld	W	D	L	GF	GA
(Lebanon) 2018	Champions	1st of 3	2	2	0	0	6	2
(Bahrain) 2019	Third-place	3rd of 7	5	2	2	1	7	4
(Lebanon) 2022	Third-place	3rd of 4	4	2	0	2	7	7
(Jordan) 2024	Champions	1st of 4	3	2	1	0	4	2
(Jordan) 2025	Runners-up	2nd of 4	4	3	1	0	7	1
(Jordan) 2026	To be determined							
Total	Best: Champions	5/5	18	11	4	3	31	16

== See also ==
- Jordan women's national football team
- Jordan women's national under-17 football team
