= 2022 WAFF U-18 Girls Championship =

Women's national youth association football tournament

بطولة اتحاد غرب آسيا الثالثة للشابات لبنان ٢٠٢٢

Tournament details
- Host country: Lebanon
- City: Jounieh
- Dates: 19–25 October
- Teams: 4 (from 1 sub-confederation)
- Venue: 1 (in 1 host city)

Final positions
- Champions: Lebanon A (2nd title)
- Runners-up: Syria
- Third place: Jordan
- Fourth place: Lebanon B

Tournament statistics
- Matches played: 8
- Goals scored: 30 (3.75 per match)
- Top scorer(s): (Jordan) Maya Owaisat (4 goals)
- Best player: (Lebanon) Christy Maalouf
- Best goalkeeper: (Syria) Raneem Abo Lateef

The 2022 WAFF U-18 Girls Championship was the third edition of the WAFF U-18 Girls Championship, the international women's football youth championship of Western Asia organized by the West Asian Football Federation (WAFF) for the women's under-18 national teams of West Asia. It was held in Lebanon from 19 to 25 October 2022.

Host Lebanon were the defending champions having won the last edition in Bahrain. and successfully defended the title after beating Syria 5–1 in the final.

== Participation ==
=== Participating teams ===
Initially, six (out of 12) WAFF nations were set to enter the final tournament. However Iraq and Palestine withdrew before the draw. As a result, Host Lebanon entered two teams Team A (Under-18) and Team B (Under-16) to maintain the tournament’s competitiveness, with the number of participating teams reduced to three.

Country	App.	Previous best performance
Jordan	3rd	Champions (2018)
Lebanon A	3rd	Champions (2019)
Lebanon B	1st	Debut
Syria	1st	Debut

Did not enter

- Bahrain
- Iraq (W)
- Kuwait
- Oman
- Qatar
- Palestine (W)
- Saudi Arabia
- United Arab Emirates
- Yemen

=== Draw ===
The draw was held on 29 September 2022 at 13:00 AST (UTC+3).

=== Squads ===
Players born between 1 January 2005 and 31 December 2009 were eligible to compete in the tournament.

== Group stage ==
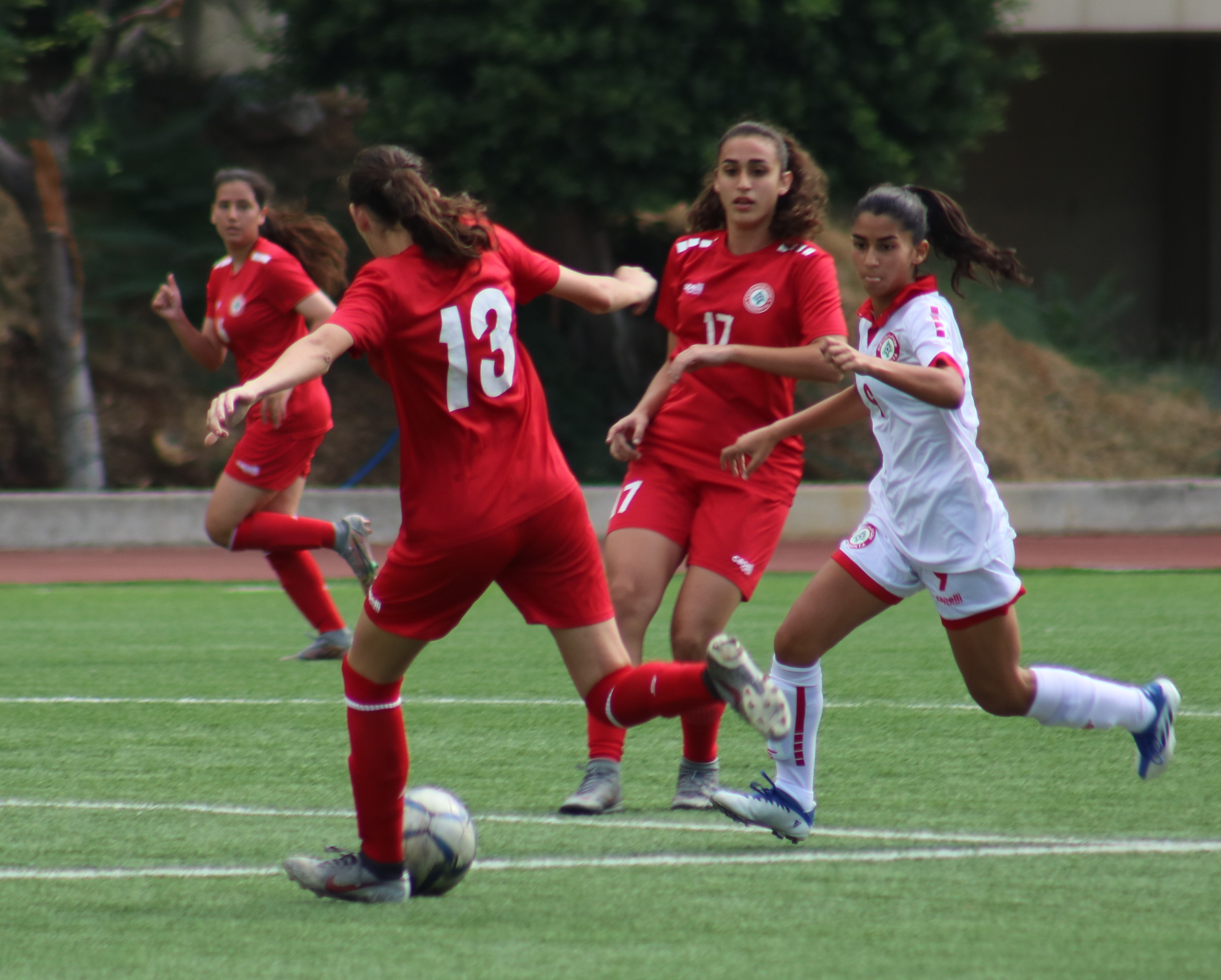
Lebanon A v Lebanon B, 19 October 2022

All times are local, AST (UTC+3).

Pos	Team	Pld	W	D	L	GF	GA	GD	Pts	Final result
1	Lebanon A (H)	3	3	0	0	8	1	+7	9	Advance to final
2	Syria	3	2	0	1	7	5	+2	6	Advance to final
3	Jordan	3	1	0	2	5	6	−1	3	Advance to third place play-off
4	Lebanon B (H)	3	0	0	3	1	9	−8	0	Advance to third place play-off

Source: WAFF
Rules for classification: Group stage tiebreakers
(H) Hosts
19 October 2022
11:00 UTC+3

Syria	4–3	Jordan
Dayoub 19', 66'; Noureddin 23', 71'	Report	Owaisat 43', 60'; Arabi 80' (o.g.)

Fouad Chehab Stadium, Jounieh
19 October 2022
14:00 UTC+3

Lebanon A	4–1	Lebanon B
Hamzi 20', 22'; Allouch 23'; Raed 44'	Report	Abdine 78'

Fouad Chehab Stadium, Jounieh
Referee: Baddour Alesar (Syria)

21 October 2022
11:00 UTC+3

Lebanon B	0–3	Syria
	Report	Mohammad 4'; Jarbou 15'; Gharib 53'

Fouad Chehab Stadium, Jounieh
Referee: Esra'a AlMbaidin (Jordan)
21 October 2022
14:00 UTC+3

Jordan	0–2	Lebanon A
	Report	Maalouf 5', 90+3'

Fouad Chehab Stadium, Jounieh

23 October 2022
11:00 UTC+3

Jordan	2–0	Lebanon B
Shuwayyat 45'; Owaisat 73'	Report

Fouad Chehab Stadium, Jounieh
23 October 2022
14:00 UTC+3

Lebanon A	2–0	Syria
Fayad 13' (pen.); Assaf 87'	Report

Fouad Chehab Stadium, Jounieh

== Knockout stage ==
Final
25 October - Fouad Chehab Stadium
Lebanon A	5
Syria	1
Third place play-off
25 October - Fouad Chehab Stadium
Jordan	2
Lebanon B	1

=== Third place play-off ===
25 October 2022
11:00 UTC+3

Jordan	2–1	Lebanon B
Owaisat 2'; AlTmaizy 45+2' (pen.)	Report	Iskandar 53'

Fouad Chehab Stadium, Jounieh

=== Final ===
25 October 2022
14:00 UTC+3

Lebanon A	5–1	Syria
Karime 43', 61'; Maalouf 45+1'; Allouch 47'; El Haddad 83'	Report	Dayoub 59'

Fouad Chehab Stadium, Jounieh

== Player awards ==
The following awards were given at the conclusion of the tournament:

Top Goalscorer	Best player	Best Goalkeeper
(Jordan) Maya Owaisat (4 goals)	(Lebanon) Christy Maalouf	(Syria) Raneem Abo Lateef

== Goalscorers ==
There were 30 goals scored in 8 matches, for an average of 3.75 goals per match.

4 goals

- (Jordan) Maya Owaisat

3 goals

- (Lebanon) Christy Maalouf
- (Syria) Hayat Dayoub

2 goals

- (Lebanon) Hiba Allouch
- (Lebanon) Hoda Hamzi
- (Lebanon) Amina Karime
- (Syria) Tala Noureddin

1 goal

- (Jordan) Sara AlTmaizy
- (Jordan) Tuleen Shuwayyat
- (Lebanon) Zahraa Assaf
- (Lebanon) Evelina El Haddad
- (Lebanon) Sophie Fayad
- (Lebanon) Cecile Iskandar
- (Lebanon) Waed Raed
- (Lebanon) Lama Abdine
- (Syria) Roaa Gharib
- (Syria) Karis Jarbou
- (Syria) Aya Mohammad

1 own goal

- (Syria) Shatha Arabi

Source: WAFF
