= 2018 WAFF U-18 Women's Championship =

Women's national youth association football tournament

Tournament details
- Host country: Lebanon
- City: Bhamdoun
- Dates: 28 August – 1 September
- Teams: 3 (from 1 sub-confederation)
- Venue: 1 (in 1 host city)

Final positions
- Champions: Jordan (1st title)
- Runners-up: Lebanon
- Third place: Palestine

Tournament statistics
- Matches played: 3
- Goals scored: 11 (3.67 per match)
- Top scorer(s): (Jordan) Leen Al-Btoush (Jordan) Deanna Soboh (2 goals each)

The 2018 WAFF U-18 Women's Championship was the 1st edition of the WAFF U-18 Women's Championship, the international women's football youth championship of Western Asia organised by the West Asian Football Federation (WAFF). It was held in Bhamdoun, Lebanon from 28 August to 1 September 2018. The tournament was won by Jordan, with Lebanon coming in second place and Palestine in third place.

== Teams ==
Three teams entered the tournament.

Country	Appearance	Previous best performance
Jordan	1st	n/a
Palestine	1st	n/a
Lebanon	1st	n/a

== Group stage ==
Pos	Team	Pld	W	D	L	GF	GA	GD	Pts
1	Jordan	2	2	0	0	6	2	+4	6
2	Lebanon	2	1	0	1	4	2	+2	3
3	Palestine	2	0	0	2	1	7	−6	0

Source: The AFC
28 August 2018
17:00

Lebanon	3–0	Palestine
Awad 12'; Azzi 45+2'; Tamim 59'	Report

Amin Abdelnour Stadium, Bhamdoun
Referee: Yousef Saeed (Iraq)

30 August 2019
16:00

Palestine	1–4	Jordan
Shattara 48'	Report	Al-Btoush 51', 80'; Abou Ghoush 73'; Soboh 86'

Amin Abdelnour Stadium, Bhamdoun

1 September 2019

Jordan	2–1	Lebanon
Soboh 34'; Fraij 80'	Report	Alkasti 75'

Amin Abdelnour Stadium, Bhamdoun

=== Champions ===
2018 WAFF U-18 Women's Championship

Jordan
First title

== Statistics ==
=== Goalscorers ===
There were 11 goals scored in 3 matches, for an average of 3.67 goals per match.

2 goals

- (Jordan) Leen Al-Btoush
- (Jordan) Deanna Soboh

1 goal

- (Jordan) Jana Abou Ghoush
- (Jordan) Rozbahan Fraij
- (Lebanon) Samira Awad
- (Lebanon) Joya Maria Azzi
- (Lebanon) Hanin Tamim
- (Lebanon) Dima Alkasti
- (Palestine) Jenniver Shattara

Source: WAFF
