= 2006 AFC U-19 Women's Championship =

AFC U-19 Women's Championship

Tournament details
- Host country: Malaysia
- Dates: 8–18 April
- Teams: 8 (from 1 confederation)
- Venue: 1 (in 1 host city)

Final positions
- Champions: China (1st title)
- Runners-up: North Korea
- Third place: Australia
- Fourth place: Japan

Tournament statistics
- Matches played: 16
- Goals scored: 112 (7 per match)

The 2006 AFC U-19 Women's Championship was the third edition of the AFC U-19 Women's Championship. It was held from 8 to 18 April 2006 in Kuala Lumpur, Malaysia. The top three teams qualified for the 2006 FIFA U-20 Women's World Championship.

It was the first AFC tournament in which Australia participated.

== Qualification ==
Automatically qualified

- South Korea (2004 Champions)
- China (2004 Runners-up)
- North Korea (2004 Third place)
- Malaysia (Hosts)

Qualified Teams

- Japan (North Zone)
- Australia (East Zone)
- India (South Zone)
- Jordan (West Zone)

== Group stage ==
=== Group A ===
Team	Pld	W	D	L	GF	GA	GD	Pts
Japan	3	3	0	0	11	1	+10	9
North Korea	3	2	0	1	16	4	+12	6
South Korea	3	1	0	2	13	4	+9	3
India	3	0	0	3	0	31	−31	0

8 April 2006
17:30

South Korea	11–0	India

KLFA Stadium, Kuala Lumpur

8 April 2006
19:45

North Korea	0–3	Japan

KLFA Stadium, Kuala Lumpur

10 April 2006
17:30

India	0–14	North Korea

KLFA Stadium, Kuala Lumpur

10 April 2006
19:45

Japan	2–1	South Korea

KLFA Stadium, Kuala Lumpur

12 April 2006
19:45

South Korea	1–2	North Korea

KLFA Stadium, Kuala Lumpur

12 April 2006
19:45

India	0–6	Japan

MBPJ Stadium, Petaling Jaya

=== Group B ===
Team	Pld	W	D	L	GF	GA	GD	Pts
Australia	3	3	0	0	24	0	+24	9
China	3	2	0	1	31	1	+30	6
Jordan	3	1	0	2	2	17	−15	3
Malaysia	3	0	0	3	1	40	−39	0

9 April 2006
17:30

China	0–1	Australia

KLFA Stadium, Kuala Lumpur

9 April 2006
19:45

Malaysia	1–2	Jordan

KLFA Stadium, Kuala Lumpur

11 April 2006
17:30

Australia	16–0	Malaysia

KLFA Stadium, Kuala Lumpur

11 April 2006
19:45

Jordan	0–9	China

KLFA Stadium, Kuala Lumpur

13 April 2006
19:45

China	22–0	Malaysia

KLFA Stadium, Kuala Lumpur

13 April 2006
19:45

Australia	7–0	Jordan

MBPJ Stadium, Petaling Jaya

== Knockout stage ==
=== Semi-finals ===
15 April 2006
17:00

Japan	1–1	China
Penalties
	3–5

KLFA Stadium, Kuala Lumpur

15 April 2006
19:45

Australia	2–4	North Korea

KLFA Stadium, Kuala Lumpur

=== Third place match ===
18 April 2006
17:00

Japan	2–3	Australia

KLFA Stadium, Kuala Lumpur

=== Final ===
18 April 2006
19:45

China	1–0	North Korea
Ma Xiaoxu 76'	Report

KLFA Stadium, Kuala Lumpur

== Winners ==
2006 AFC U-19 Women's Championship

China
First title
