= 2025–26 in Indonesian football =

Football in Indonesia
- Season: 2025–26

The following article presents a summary of the 2025–26 football season in Indonesia.

== Promotion and relegation ==
League	Promoted to 2025–26 league season	Relegated from 2024–25 league season
Super League	–	PSS; Barito Putera; PSIS
Championship	Bhayangkara Presisi; Persijap; PSIM	Dejan; Gresik United; Nusantara United; Persewar; Persibo; Persikabo 1973; Persikota; Persipa; RANS Nusantara
Liga Nusantara	Sumut United; Tornado; Persiba Balikpapan	Kalteng Putra; Sulut United; Persipani; 757 Kepri Jaya; Persikab; PCB Persipasi; PSCS; PSM Madiun
Liga 4	Tri Brata Rafflesia; Persika Karanganyar; Pekanbaru; Persebata; Batavia; Perseden; Sang Maestro; Persitara	–

== National teams ==
=== Men's national football team ===
5 September 2025 Int'l Friendly	Indonesia	6–0	Chinese Taipei	Surabaya, Indonesia
20:30 UTC+7	Amat 4'; Chao Ming-hsiu 23' (o.g.); Klok 33'; Reijnders 38'; Sananta 58'; Walsh 60'	Report		Stadium: Gelora Bung Tomo Stadium; Attendance: 24,272; Referee: Ryo Tanimoto (Japan)

8 September 2025 Int'l Friendly	Indonesia	0–0	Lebanon	Surabaya, Indonesia
20:30 UTC+7		Report		Stadium: Gelora Bung Tomo Stadium; Attendance: 27,052; Referee: Ko Hyung-jin (South Korea)

==== 2026 FIFA World Cup qualification – AFC fourth round ====
2026 World Cup qualification R4 8 October 2025	Indonesia	2–3	Saudi Arabia	Jeddah, Saudi Arabia
20:15 UTC+3	Diks 11' (pen.), 88' (pen.)	Report	Abu Al-Shamat 17'; Al-Buraikan 36' (pen.), 62'	Stadium: King Abdullah Sports City Stadium; Attendance: 40,634; Referee: Ahmed Al-Ali (Kuwait)

2026 World Cup qualification R4 11 October 2025	Iraq	1–0	Indonesia	Jeddah, Saudi Arabia
20:30 UTC+3	Iqbal 76'	Report		Stadium: King Abdullah Sports City Stadium; Attendance: 14,687; Referee: Ma Ning (China)

==== 2026 FIFA Series ====
27 March 2026 FIFA Series	Indonesia	4–0	Saint Kitts and Nevis	Jakarta, Indonesia
20:00 UTC+7	Beckham 15', 25'; Romeny 53'; Zijlstra 75'	Report		Stadium: Gelora Bung Karno Stadium; Attendance: 26,703; Referee: Muhammad Taqi (Singapore)

30 March 2026 FIFA Series	Indonesia	0–1	Bulgaria	Jakarta, Indonesia
20:00 UTC+7		Report	M. Petkov 38' (pen.)	Stadium: Gelora Bung Karno Stadium; Attendance: 24,174; Referee: Nazmi Nasaruddin (Malaysia)

==== 2026 Garuda Championship Series ====
5 June Garuda Championship Series	Indonesia	3–0	Oman	Jakarta, Indonesia
20:00 UTC+7	Hubner 13'; Romeny 27'; Oratmangoen 55'	Report		Stadium: Gelora Bung Karno Stadium; Attendance: 23,677; Referee: Muhammad Taqi (Singapore)

9 June Garuda Championship Series	Indonesia	1–0	Mozambique	Jakarta, Indonesia
20:00 UTC+7	Romeny 12'	Report		Stadium: Gelora Bung Karno Stadium; Attendance: 29,889; Referee: Muhammad Taqi (Singapore)

==== 2026 ASEAN Championship ====
27 July 2026 ASEAN Championship	Indonesia	5–1	Cambodia	Bogor, Indonesia
20:30 UTC+7	Baker 6', 15', 56'; Walsh 24'; Raven 86'	Report	Nadeo 48' (o.g.)	Stadium: Pakansari Stadium; Attendance: 22,485; Referee: Kim Woo-Sung (South Korea)

31 July 2026 ASEAN Championship	Timor-Leste	0–3	Indonesia	Chonburi, Thailand
17:00 UTC+7		Report	Pattynama 74'; Haye 78'; Baker 81'	Stadium: Chonburi Stadium; Attendance: 189; Referee: Choi Hyun-jai (South Korea)

3 August 2026 ASEAN Championship	Indonesia	0–3	Vietnam	Bogor, Indonesia
20:30 UTC+7		Report	Nguyễn Văn Vĩ 6'; Nguyễn Hai Long 14'; Rafaelson 71'	Stadium: Pakansari Stadium; Attendance: 27,265; Referee: Tim Danaskos (Australia)

7 August 2026 ASEAN Championship	Singapore	1–1	Indonesia	Kallang, Singapore
21:00 UTC+8	Ilhan 66'	Report	Oratmangoen 47'	Stadium: Jalan Besar Stadium; Attendance: 5,113; Referee: Abdullah Salim Khalfan Al-Amouri (Oman)

=== Men's under-23 football team ===
10 October 2025 Friendly	Indonesia	1–2	India	Jakarta, Indonesia
18:30 IST	Pamungkas 41'	Report	Bhat 5', 26'	Stadium: Gelora Bung Karno Madya Stadium

13 October 2025 Friendly	Indonesia	1–1	India	Jakarta, Indonesia
18:30 IST	Pamungkas 70'	Report	Thingujam 47'	Stadium: Gelora Bung Karno Madya Stadium

15 November Friendly	Indonesia	0–3	Mali	Bogor, Indonesia
20:00 UTC+7		Report	Doucoure 4'; Samake 32'; Moulaye Haidara 90+1'	Stadium: Pakansari; Referee: Warintorn Sassadee (Thailand)

18 November Friendly	Mali	2–2	Indonesia	Bogor, Indonesia
20:00 UTC+7	Koné 12', 70'	Report	Zijlstra 38'; Struick 52'	Stadium: Pakansari; Referee: Mohamad Kamil Zakaria (Malaysia)

==== 2025 ASEAN U-23 Championship ====
15 July 2025 ASEAN U-23 Championship	Indonesia	8–0	Brunei	Jakarta, Indonesia
20:00 UTC+7	Raven 2', 9', 31', 33', 41' (pen.), 62'; Arkhan 20'; R. Hannan 35'	Report		Stadium: Gelora Bung Karno; Attendance: 2,743; Referee: Muhammad Zulfiqar (Singapore)

18 July 2025 ASEAN U-23 Championship	Philippines	0–1	Indonesia	Jakarta, Indonesia
20:00 UTC+7		Report	Rosquillo 23' (o.g.)	Stadium: Gelora Bung Karno; Attendance: 8,409; Referee: Mohammed Sami Al-Ismail (Saudi Arabia)

21 July 2025 ASEAN U-23 Championship	Indonesia	0–0	Malaysia	Jakarta, Indonesia
20:00 UTC+7		Report		Stadium: Gelora Bung Karno] Attendance: 27,013; Referee: Koji Takasaki (Japan)

25 July 2025 ASEAN U-23 Championship SF	Indonesia	1–1 (a.e.t.) (7–6 p)	Thailand	Jakarta, Indonesia
20:00 UTC+7	Raven 84'	Report	Yotsakorn 60'	Stadium: Gelora Bung Karno] Attendance: 10,771; Referee: Mohammed Sami Al-Ismail (Saudi Arabia)
	Penalties
	Arel (penalty scored); Rudianto (penalty scored); Darwis (penalty missed); Caraka (penalty scored); Hannan (penalty scored); Yafi (penalty scored); Scheunemann (penalty scored); Buffon (penalty scored)		(penalty missed) Sienkrthok; (penalty scored) Phochai; (penalty scored) Namphueng; (penalty scored) Noiwong; (penalty scored) Laorkai; (penalty scored) Sealao; (penalty scored) Suksakit; (penalty missed) Yotsakorn

29 July 2025 ASEAN U-23 Championship F	Vietnam	1–0	Indonesia	Jakarta, Indonesia
20:00 UTC+7	Nguyễn Công Phương 37'	Report		Stadium: Gelora Bung Karno; Attendance: 35,500; Referee: Koji Takasaki (Japan)

==== 2026 AFC U-23 Asian Cup qualification ====
3 September 2026 AFC U-23 Asian Cup qualification	Indonesia	0–0	Laos	Sidoarjo, Indonesia
19:30 UTC+7		Report		Stadium: Gelora Delta; Attendance: 5,238; Referee: Mohamed Jafran (Sri Lanka)

6 September 2026 AFC U-23 Asian Cup qualification	Macau	0–5	Indonesia	Sidoarjo, Indonesia
19:30 UTC+7		Report	Leong Lek Han 3' (o.g.); Arkhan 18'; Rayhan 47'; Zanadin 68'; Struick 74'	Stadium: Gelora Delta; Attendance: 6.364; Referee: Sivakorn Pu-udom (Thailand)

9 September 2026 AFC U-23 Asian Cup qualification	South Korea	1–0	Indonesia	Sidoarjo, Indonesia
19:30 UTC+7	Hwang Do-yoon 7'	Report		Stadium: Gelora Delta; Attendance: 7,126; Referee: Jin Jingyuan (China)

==== 2025 SEA Games ====
8 December 2025 SEA Games	Philippines	1–0	Indonesia	Chiang Mai, Thailand
18:00 UTC+7	Banatao 45+2'	Report		Stadium: 700th Anniversary Stadium; Referee: Adel Al-Naqbi (United Arab Emirates)

12 December 2025 SEA Games	Indonesia	3–1	Myanmar	Chiang Mai, Thailand
18:00 UTC+7	Toni 45'; Raven 89', 90+5'	Report	Min Maw Oo 29'	Stadium: 700th Anniversary Stadium; Referee: Ammar Mahfoodh (Bahrain)

=== Men's under-20 football team ===
24 January U20 Challenge Series	Indonesia	0–1	Jordan	Sidoarjo, Indonesia
19:30 UTC+7				Stadium: Gelora Delta Stadium

27 January U20 Challenge Series	Indonesia	0–2	Syria	Sidoarjo, Indonesia
19:30 UTC+7				Stadium: Gelora Delta Stadium

30 January U20 Challenge Series	Indonesia	4–0	India	Sidoarjo, Indonesia
19:30 UTC+7				Stadium: Gelora Delta Stadium

13 February 2025 AFC U-20 Asian Cup GS	Iran	3–0	Indonesia	Shenzhen, China
19:30 UTC+8	Nafari 5'; Gholizadeh 63'; Dehghan 70'	Report		Stadium: Shenzhen Youth Football Training Base Centre Stadium; Attendance: 356; Referee: Hiroki Kasahara (Japan)

16 February 2025 AFC U-20 Asian Cup GS	Indonesia	1–3	Uzbekistan	Shenzhen, China
19:30 UTC+8	Raven 23'	Report	Urinboev 21'; Khaydarov 47'; Saidnurullaev 63'	Stadium: Shenzhen Youth Football Training Base Centre Stadium; Attendance: 510; Referee: Abdullah Jamali (Kuwait)

19 February 2025 AFC U-20 Asian Cup GS	Indonesia	0–0	Yemen	Shenzhen, China
19:30 UTC+8		Report		Stadium: Shenzhen Youth Football Training Base Centre Stadium; Attendance: 236; Referee: Abdulhadi Al-Rowaily (Qatar)

=== Men's under-17 football team ===
12 August 2025 Independence Cup	Indonesia	2–2	Tajikistan	Deli Serdang, Indonesia
19:30 UTC+7	Mierza 34'; Fadly 50'		Zarif 37'; Nazrullo 90+4'	Stadium: North Sumatra Stadium; Attendance: 12,517; Referee: Mohamad Kamil Zakaria (Malaysia)

15 August 2025 Independence Cup	Uzbekistan	0–2	Indonesia	Deli Serdang, Indonesia
19:30 UTC+7			Dimas 17'; Algazani 68'	Stadium: North Sumatra Stadium; Attendance: 21,537; Referee: Mohamad Kamil Zakaria (Malaysia)

18 August 2025 Independence Cup	Indonesia	1–2	Mali	Deli Serdang, Indonesia
20:30 UTC+7	Alberto 37'		Z. Ballo 22'; S. Dembélé 33'	Stadium: North Sumatra Stadium; Attendance: 21,991; Referee: Trần Ngọc Ánh (Vietnam)

7 September Hybrid Friendly	Indonesia	6–0	(Bulgaria) Septemvri Sofia U-17	Sofia, Bulgaria

10 September Hybrid Friendly	Indonesia	1–1	(Bulgaria) CSKA Sofia U-17	Sofia, Bulgaria

13 September Friendly	Indonesia	0–1	North Macedonia	Sofia, Bulgaria
17:30 UTC+3				Stadium: Dragalevtsi Stadium

25 October Friendly	Indonesia	1–2	Paraguay	Dubai, United Arab Emirates
--:-- UTC+4

27 October Friendly	Indonesia	0–0	Ivory Coast	Dubai, United Arab Emirates
--:-- UTC+4

30 October Friendly	Indonesia	1–1	Panama	Dubai, United Arab Emirates
--:-- UTC+4

==== 2025 AFC U-17 Asian Cup ====
4 April 2025 AFC U-17 Asian Cup GS	South Korea	0–1	Indonesia	Jeddah, Saudi Arabia
18:00 UTC+3		Report	Evandra 90+2'	Stadium: Prince Abdullah Al-Faisal Stadium; Referee: Jin Jingyuan (China)

7 April 2025 AFC U-17 Asian Cup GS	Indonesia	4–1	Yemen	Jeddah, Saudi Arabia
18:00 UTC+3	Gholy 15'; Alberto 25'; Evandra 87' (pen.), 89'	Report	Al-Garash 52' (pen.)	Stadium: Prince Abdullah Al-Faisal Stadium; Referee: Abdullo Davlatov (Tajikistan)

10 April 2025 AFC U-17 Asian Cup GS	Afghanistan	0–2	Indonesia	Jeddah, Saudi Arabia
20:15 UTC+3		Report	Alberto 90+4'; Gholy 90+6'	Stadium: Prince Abdullah Al-Faisal Stadium; Referee: Venkatesh Ramachandran (India)

14 April 2025 AFC U-17 Asian Cup QF	Indonesia	0–6	North Korea	Jeddah, Saudi Arabia
17:00 UTC+3		Report	Choe Song-hun 7'; Kim Yu-jin 19'; Ri Kyong-bong 48'; Kim Tae-guk 60'; Ri Kang-rim 61'; Pak Ju-won 77'	Stadium: King Abdullah Sports City Hall Stadium; Referee: Morteza Mansourian (Iran)

==== 2025 FIFA U-17 World Cup ====
4 November 2025 FIFA U-17 World Cup	Indonesia	1–3	Zambia	Al Rayyan, Qatar
18:45 UTC+3	Gholy 12'	Report	Nyirongo 35', 37'; Mwale 41'	Stadium: Aspire Zone (pitch 7), Al Rayyan; Referee: Adonis Carrasco (Dominican Republic)

7 November 2025 FIFA U-17 World Cup	Brazil	4–0	Indonesia	Al Rayyan, Qatar
18:45 UTC+3	Luis Eduardo 3'; Panji 33' (o.g.); Felipe Morais 39'; Ruan Pablo 75'	Report		Stadium: Aspire Zone (pitch 7), Al Rayyan; Referee: Hamza El Fariq (Morocco)

10 November 2025 FIFA U-17 World Cup	Honduras	1–2	Indonesia	Al Rayyan, Qatar
17:45 UTC+3	Suazo 54' (pen.)	Report	Evandra 52' (pen.); Alberto 72'	Stadium: Aspire Zone (pitch 2), Al Rayyan; Referee: Marian Barbu (Romania)

=== Women's national football team ===
20 February Friendly	Saudi Arabia	0–1	Indonesia	Jeddah, Saudi Arabia
19:30 UTC+3			Reva 31' (pen.)	Stadium: King Abdullah Sports City; Referee: Mohammed Al-Manii (Oman)

28 May Women's Tri-Nation Cup	Jordan	1–1	Indonesia	Amman, Jordan
19:00 UTC+3	Farah 45+1'		Remini 33'	Stadium: King Abdullah II Stadium

31 May Women's Tri-Nation Cup	Indonesia	0–0	Bangladesh	Amman, Jordan
19:00 UTC+3				Stadium: King Abdullah II Stadium; Referee: Perissa Nasr (Lebanon)

29 June 2026 AFC Women's Asian Cup qualification	Indonesia	1–0	Kyrgyzstan	Tangerang, Indonesia
20:00 UTC+7	Warps 62'	Report		Stadium: Indomilk Arena; Referee: Casey Reibelt (Australia)

2 July 2026 AFC Women's Asian Cup qualification	Pakistan	2–0	Indonesia	Tangerang, Indonesia
20:00 UTC+7	N. Khan 8'; Hirani 19' (pen.)	Report		Stadium: Indomilk Arena

5 July 2026 AFC Women's Asian Cup qualification	Chinese Taipei	2–1	Indonesia	Tangerang, Indonesia
20:00 UTC+7	Su Yu-hsuan 15'; Liu Yu-chiao 75'	Report	Helsya 48'	Stadium: Indomilk Arena

6 August 2025 ASEAN Women's Championship	Thailand	7–0	Indonesia	Haiphong, Vietnam
16:30 UTC+7	Phomsri 6', 27' (pen.); Casteen 19'; Manowang 40'; Jinantuya 41'; Klinklai 71'; Promthongmee 72'	Report		Stadium: Lạch Tray Stadium; Referee: Razlan Joffri Ali (Malaysia)

9 August 2025 ASEAN Women's Championship	Indonesia	0–7	Vietnam	Haiphong, Vietnam
19:30 UTC+7		Report	Nguyễn Thị Bích Thùy 25'; Hoàng Thị Loan 28'; Phạm Hải Yến 69', 85'; Ngân Thị Vạn Sự 71'; Trần Thị Thu Thảo 81'; Nguyễn Thị Tuyết Dung 89'	Stadium: Lạch Tray Stadium; Referee: Rustam Lutfullin (Uzbekistan)

12 August 2025 ASEAN Women's Championship	Indonesia	1–1	Cambodia	Việt Trì, Vietnam
19:30 UTC+7	Rosdilah 82'	Report	Saody 76'	Stadium: Việt Trì Stadium; Referee: Yu Hong (China)

26 November Friendly	Indonesia	2–1	Nepal	Yogyakarta, Indonesia
19:30 UTC+7	Gea 58'; Aulia 67'	Report	Vivi 20' (o.g.)	Stadium: Maguwoharjo Stadium

29 November Friendly	Indonesia	0–5	Chinese Taipei	Yogyakarta, Indonesia
19:30 UTC+7		Report	Nottet 35' (o.g.); Pu Hsin-hui 42'; Gea 70' (o.g.); Chen Yu-chin 75'; Hsu Yi-yun 87'	Stadium: Maguwoharjo Stadium

4 December 2025 SEA Games	Thailand	8–0	Indonesia	Chonburi, Thailand
18:30 UTC+7	Yumanda 8' (o.g.); Pattaranan 21'; Silawan 27'; Saowalak 44'; Jiraporn 50' (pen.), 52' (pen.), 59'; Panittha 55'	Report		Stadium: Chonburi Stadium; Referee: Azusa Sugino (Japan)

7 December 2025 SEA Games	Singapore	1–3	Indonesia	Chonburi, Thailand
16:00 UTC+7	Ruhaizat 22'	Report	Warps 31'; Scheunemann 62'; Aulia 90+5'	Stadium: IPE Chonburi Stadium; Referee: Esra'a Almbaidin (Jordan)

14 December 2025 SEA Games SF	Vietnam	5–0	Indonesia	Chonburi, Thailand
16:00 UTC+7	Nguyễn Thị Bích Thùy 28' (pen.), 80'; Phạm Hải Yến 49', 58'; Huỳnh Như 86'	Report		Stadium: IPE Chonburi Stadium; Referee: Alesar Baddour (Syria)

17 December 2025 SEA Games 3rd	Thailand	2–0	Indonesia	Chonburi, Thailand
15:30 UTC+7	Pitsamai 17'; Pattaranan 43'	Report		Stadium: IPE Chonburi Stadium; Referee: Gulshoda Saitkulova (Uzbekistan)

=== Women's national under-20 football team ===
9 June ASEAN U-19 Women's GS	Thailand	6–1	Indonesia	Ho Chi Minh City, Vietnam
15:00 UTC+7	Ruttawalin 7'; Kurisara 16'; Manita 25'; Prichakorn 65'; Phatcharaphorn 70'; Rasita 77'	Report	Nasywa Z. 90+6'	Stadium: District 8 Stadium

11 June ASEAN U-19 Women's GS	Indonesia	1–1	Cambodia	Ho Chi Minh City, Vietnam
15:00 UTC+7	Jazlyn 12'		Moa 7'	Stadium: Đạt Đức Stadium

13 June ASEAN U-19 Women's GS	Indonesia	4–0	Malaysia	Ho Chi Minh City, Vietnam
15:00 UTC+7	Nasywa S. 14'; Hopper 30'; Jazlyn 60'; Allya 63'			Stadium: Phú Thọ Stadium

16 June ASEAN U-19 Women's SF	Vietnam	4–0	Indonesia	Ho Chi Minh City, Vietnam
18:30 UTC+7	Tạ Thị Hồng Minh 10'; Lưu Hoàng Vân 36', 53'; Trương Thị Hoài Trinh 47'			Stadium: Thống Nhất Stadium

18 June ASEAN U-19 Women's 3rd place	Myanmar	0–0 (5–6 p)	Indonesia	Ho Chi Minh City, Vietnam
15:00 UTC+7				Stadium: Thống Nhất Stadium
	Penalties
	Yu Ya Naing (penalty scored); Daisy Aung (penalty scored); Yin Loon Eain (penalty scored); Nan Cho Hmwe (penalty missed); Yu Yu Naing (penalty scored); Sandar Lin (penalty scored); Ya Min Phyu (penalty missed)		(penalty scored) Auliah; (penalty scored) Nasywa Fattah; (penalty scored) Gea; (penalty missed) Shifana; (penalty scored) Nasywa Rambe; (penalty scored) Jezlyn; (penalty scored) Nabyla

6 August 2026 AFC U-20 Women's Asian Cup qualification	India	0–0	Indonesia	Yangon, Myanmar
19:00 UTC+6:30				Stadium: Thuwunna Stadium

8 August 2026 AFC U-20 Women's Asian Cup qualification	Indonesia	2–2	Myanmar	Yangon, Myanmar
16:00 UTC+6:30	Handayani 69'; Azkha 72'		Yin Loon Eain 39'; Win 53'	Stadium: Thuwunna Stadium

10 August 2026 AFC U-20 Women's Asian Cup qualification	Indonesia	4–0	Turkmenistan	Yangon, Myanmar
19:00 UTC+6:30	Gea Yumanda 10'; Nadhifa 27'; Handayani 39'; Aulia Mabruroh 90+1'			Stadium: Thuwunna Stadium

=== Women's national under-17 football team ===
20 August ASEAN U-16 Women's GS	Timor-Leste	0–6	Indonesia	Surakarta, Indonesia
19:30 UTC+7			Nasywa 15', 24', 36'; Jazlyn 20'; Jezlyn 25'; Chorlienka 62'	Stadium: Manahan Stadium; Referee: Cha Min-ji (South Korea)

24 August ASEAN U-16 Women's GS	Indonesia	3–1	Malaysia	Surakarta, Indonesia
19:30 UTC+7	Nasywa 4'; Jazlyn 15' (pen.); Vivi 82'		Laila 81'	Stadium: Manahan Stadium; Referee: Asaka Koizumi (Japan)

27 August ASEAN U-16 Women's SF	Indonesia	0–3	Australia	Surakarta, Indonesia
19:30 UTC+7			Puckett 22', 27'; Jugovic 59'	Stadium: Manahan Stadium; Referee: Asaka Koizumi (Japan)

29 August ASEAN U-16 Women's Third Place Match	Vietnam	1–1 (7–6 p)	Indonesia	Surakarta, Indonesia
15:30 UTC+7	Nazwa 2' (o.g.)		Naffeza 15'	Stadium: Manahan Stadium; Referee: Pansa Chaisanit (Thailand)
	Penalties
	Nguyễn Thị Ngọc Ánh (penalty scored); Trần Thị An (penalty scored); Nguyễn Thị Linh Chi (penalty scored); Hà Yến Nhi (penalty scored); Lê Thị Hồng Thái (penalty scored); Nguyễn Dương Phương Nghi (penalty scored); Nguyễn Thị Minh Ánh (penalty scored)		(penalty scored) Naffeza; (penalty scored) Shifana; (penalty scored) Indira; (penalty scored) Febri; (penalty scored) Jazlyn; (penalty scored) Syafia; (penalty missed) Vivi

13 October 2026 AFC U-17 Women's Asian Cup qualification	Indonesia	2–0	Macau	Yangon, Myanmar
15:30 UTC+6:30	Jazlyn 57'; Katarina 60'	Report		Stadium: Padaythar Football Stadium; Referee: Doumouh Al Bakkar (Lebanon)

17 October 2026 AFC U-17 Women's Asian Cup qualification	Indonesia	0–1	Myanmar	Yangon, Myanmar
16:00 UTC+6:30		Report	S.T Phyu Sin Pyone 45'	Stadium: Thuwunna Stadium; Referee: Mu Mingxin (China)

=== Men's national futsal team ===
==== 2025 CFA International Men's Futsal Tournament Shijiazhuang ====
5 September 2025 CFA International Men's Futsal Tournament GS	Indonesia	5–1	Cambodia	Hebei, China
13:30 UTC+8	Gunawan 2'; Faturrahman 18'; Priambudi 22', 39'; Persada 38'	Report	Ros Sichomrouen 40'	Stadium: Shijiazhuang College Sports Venue

6 September 2025 CFA International Men's Futsal Tournament GS	Indonesia	5–0	Myanmar	Hebei, China
13:30 UTC+8	Fauzan 12'; Gunawan 21', 38'; Persada 37' (pen.); Zidan 37'	Report		Stadium: Shijiazhuang College Sports Venue

8 September 2025 CFA International Men's Futsal Tournament GS	New Zealand	1–2	Indonesia	Hebei, China
13:30 UTC+8	Ashby-Peckham 4'	Report	Gunawan 18'; Fauzan 39'	Stadium: Shijiazhuang College Sports Venue

9 September 2025 CFA International Men's Futsal Tournament SF	Indonesia	3–0	South Korea	Hebei, China
14:30 UTC+8	Fajriyan 8'; Faturrahman 21'; Persada 38'	Report		Stadium: Shijiazhuang College Sports Venue

11 September 2025 CFA International Men's Futsal Tournament F	Indonesia	4–2	Denmark	Hebei, China
17:30 UTC+8	Dewa Rizki 2'; Gunawan 10', 17'; Persada 22'	Report	Rasmussen 19'; Hansen 38'	Stadium: Shijiazhuang College Sports Venue

==== 2025 Aqua Futsal Four Nations Cup ====
18 September 2025 Exhibition 4 Nations World Series	Indonesia	7–1	Tanzania	Jakarta, Indonesia
18:30 UTC+7				Stadium: GBK Basketball Hall A

20 September 2025 Exhibition 4 Nations World Series	Indonesia	5–1	Netherlands	Jakarta, Indonesia
18:30 UTC+7				Stadium: GBK Basketball Hall A

21 September 2025 Exhibition 4 Nations World Series	Indonesia	2–3	Latvia	Jakarta, Indonesia
18:30 UTC+7				Stadium: GBK Basketball Hall A

==== November 2025 FIFA Matchday ====
1 November 2025 Int'l Friendly	Indonesia	3–1	Australia	Jakarta, Indonesia
19:00 UTC+7	Adriansyah 16'; Brian Ick 22', 33'	Report	Lynch 26'; Jayden Harb (red card) 32'	Stadium: Indonesia Arena

==== Futsal at 2025 SEA Games ====
15 December 2025 2025 SEA Games	Indonesia	5–1	Myanmar	Nonthaburi, Thailand
16:00 UTC+7	Israr Megantara 2'; Iqbal Iskandar 8', 9'; Rizki Xavier 32'; Syauqi Saud 39'	Report		Stadium: Nonthaburi Sports Complex Gymnasium

17 December 2025 2025 SEA Games	Vietnam	1–0	Indonesia	Nonthaburi, Thailand
16:00 UTC+7	Từ Minh Quang 11'	Report		Stadium: Nonthaburi Sports Complex Gymnasium

18 December 2025 2025 SEA Games	Indonesia	2–1	Malaysia	Nonthaburi, Thailand
16:00 UTC+7	Evan Soumilena 4'; Reza Gunawan 13'	Report	Brian Ick 17' (o.g.)	Stadium: Nonthaburi Sports Complex Gymnasium

19 December 2025 2025 SEA Games	Thailand	1–6	Indonesia	Nonthaburi, Thailand
19:00 UTC+7	Krit Aransanyalak 37'		Firman Adriansyah 13' (pen.); Syauqi Saud 17'; Samuel Eko 23'; Rizki Amanda 29'; Ardiansyah Nur 35', 39'	Stadium: Nonthaburi Sports Complex Gymnasium; Referee: Moon Dae-sung (South Korea)

==== 2026 AFC Futsal Asian Cup ====
27 January 2026 2026 AFC Futsal Asian Cup GS	Indonesia	5–0	South Korea	Jakarta, Indonesia
19:00 UTC+7	Iqbal 1'16", 20'54"; Rio Pangestu 10'29"; Israr 28'52"; Reza Gunawan 36'03"	Report		Stadium: Indonesia Arena; Referee: Andrew Best (Australia), Oya Tsubasa (Japan)

29 January 2026 2026 AFC Futsal Asian Cup GS	Kyrgyzstan	3–5	Indonesia	Jakarta, Indonesia
19:00 UTC+7	Makhmadaminov 5'55", 26'00"; Alimov 26'23" (pen.)	Report	Iqbal 6'51"; F. Adriansyah 11'57" (pen.); Rio 24'35"; Ardiansyah Nur 28'38"; Israr 33'50"	Stadium: Indonesia Arena; Referee: Sukhrob Sattorov (Tajikistan), Anatoliy Rubakov (Uzbekistan)

31 January 2026 2026 AFC Futsal Asian Cup GS	Indonesia	1–1	Iraq	Jakarta, Indonesia
19:00 UTC+7	Samuel Eko 5'41"	Report	Haedr Majed 29'27"	Stadium: Indonesia Arena; Referee: Yahya Al-Athwani (Saudi Arabia), Ebrahim Mehrabiafshar (Iran)

3 February 2026 2026 AFC Futsal Asian Cup QF	Indonesia	3–2	Vietnam	Jakarta, Indonesia
19:00 UTC+7	Brian Ick 3'47"; Ardiansyah 10'23"; Reza 25'40"	Report	Nguyễn Đa Hải 24'51", 35'43"	Stadium: Indonesia Arena; Referee: Hawkar Ahmed (Iraq), Pornnarong Grairod (Thailand)

5 February 2026 2026 AFC Futsal Asian Cup SF	Indonesia	5–3 (a.e.t.)	Japan	Jakarta, Indonesia
19:00 UTC+7	Samuel Eko 11'30"; Motoishi 22'07" (o.g.); F. Adriansyah 38'22"; Reza 44'16"; Dewa Rizki 47'01"	Report	Motoishi 30'21"; Shimizu 34'17", 39'22" (pen.)	Stadium: Indonesia Arena; Referee: Fahad Al-Hosani (United Arab Emirates), Anatoliy Rubakov (Uzbekistan)

7 February 2026 2026 AFC Futsal Asian Cup F	Indonesia	5–5 (a.e.t.) (4–5 p)	Iran	Jakarta, Indonesia
19:00 UTC+7	Reza 6'28"; Israr 7'37", 8'31", 48'05"; Samuel Eko 23'20"	Report	Tayebi 2'53"; Karimi 17'59", 36'53"; Ahmadabbasi 22'57"; Aghapour 48'42"	Stadium: Indonesia Arena; Referee: Liu Jianqiao (China), Sukhrob Sattorov (Tajikistan)
	Penalties
	F. Adriansyah (penalty scored); Rio (penalty scored); Rizki Xavier (penalty scored); Dewa Rizki (penalty missed); Ardiansyah (penalty scored); Israr (penalty missed)		(penalty missed) Shavardazi; (penalty scored) Derakhshani; (penalty scored) Ahmadabbasi; (penalty scored) Aghapour; (penalty scored) Tayebi; (penalty scored) Sabzi

==== 2026 ASEAN Futsal Championship ====
6 April 2026 2026 ASEAN Futsal Championship GS	Indonesia	7–0	Brunei	Nonthaburi, Thailand
12:30 UTC+7	Sanjaya 4', 4', 20'; Kareth 10', 24'; I. Anshori 12'; Rizki 17'	Report		Stadium: Nonthaburi Sports Complex Gymnasium; Referee: Benjapol Mucharoensap (Thailand)

7 April 2026 2026 ASEAN Futsal Championship GS	Malaysia	0–1	Indonesia	Nonthaburi, Thailand
15:00 UTC+7		Report	G. Sulistyo 23'	Stadium: Nonthaburi Sports Complex Gymnasium; Referee: Takeshi Fujita (Japan)

8 April 2026 2026 ASEAN Futsal Championship GS	Indonesia	3–2	Australia	Nonthaburi, Thailand
12:30 UTC+7	A. Putra 9', 36'; Sanjaya 40'	Report	Harb 19'; Garnham 36'	Stadium: Nonthaburi Sports Complex Gymnasium; Referee: Takeshi Fujita (Japan)

10 April 2026 2026 ASEAN Futsal Championship SF	Indonesia	3–2	Vietnam	Nonthaburi, Thailand
17:00 UTC+7	Kareth 10', 13'; Sanjaya 23'	Report	Nguyễn Đa Hải 22'; Trần Quang Nguyên 30'	Stadium: Nonthaburi Sports Complex Gymnasium; Referee: Moon Dae-sung (South Korea)

12 April 2026 2026 ASEAN Futsal Championship F	Indonesia	1–2	Thailand	Nonthaburi, Thailand
20:00 UTC+7	Putra 16'	Report	Itticha 20'; Panat 31'	Stadium: Nonthaburi Sports Complex Gymnasium; Referee: Takeshi Fujita (Japan)

== League tables ==
=== Super League ===
Pos	Team	Pld	W	D	L	GF	GA	GD	Pts	Qualification or relegation
1	Persib (C)	34	24	7	3	59	22	+37	79 (Note: Head-to-head points: Persib 4, Borneo Samarinda 1.)	Qualification for the 2026–27 AFC Champions League Two play-offs and 2026–27 ASEAN Club Championship group stage
2	Borneo Samarinda	34	25	4	5	74	31	+43	79	Qualification for the 2026–27 AFC Challenge League and 2026–27 ASEAN Club Championship group stage
3	Persija	34	22	5	7	65	29	+36	71	
4	Persebaya	34	16	10	8	61	35	+26	58	
5	Bhayangkara Presisi	34	16	5	13	53	45	+8	53 (Note: Head-to-head points: Bhayangkara Presisi 9, Malut United 6, Dewa United Banten 3.)	
6	Malut United	34	15	8	11	68	53	+15	53	
7	Dewa United Banten	34	16	5	13	44	37	+7	53	
8	Bali United	34	14	9	11	57	48	+9	51	
9	Arema	34	13	9	12	53	47	+6	48	
10	Persita	34	13	6	15	38	37	+1	45 (Note: Head-to-head points: Persita 6, PSIM 0.)	
11	PSIM	34	11	12	11	43	44	−1	45	
12	Persik	34	11	6	17	42	61	−19	39	
13	Persijap	34	9	9	16	31	45	−14	36	
14	Madura United	34	9	8	17	37	54	−17	35	
15	PSM	34	8	10	16	39	49	−10	34 (Note: Head-to-head points: PSM 4, Persis 1)	
16	Persis (R)	34	8	10	16	39	59	−20	34	Relegation to the 2026–27 Championship
17	Semen Padang (R)	34	5	5	24	22	65	−43	20	Relegation to the 2026–27 Championship
18	PSBS (R)	34	4	6	24	31	95	−64	18	Relegation to the 2026–27 Championship

Source: Super League 2025–26
Rules for classification: 1) Points; 2) Head-to-head points; 3) Head-to-head goal difference; 4) Head-to-head goals scored; 5) Goal difference; 6) Goals scored; 7) Fair-play points; 8) Draw.
(C) Champions; (R) Relegated

==== Championship ====
Pos	Team	Pld	W	D	L	GF	GA	GD	Pts	Promotion, qualification or relegation
1	Garudayaksa (C, P)	27	14	10	3	49	19	+30	52	Promotion to the 2026–27 Super League and qualification for the final
2	Adhyaksa Banten (O, P)	27	14	9	4	60	31	+29	51	Qualification for the promotion play-off
3	Bekasi City	27	12	8	7	45	29	+16	44	
4	Sumsel United	27	12	6	9	40	33	+7	42	
5	Persiraja	27	10	10	7	42	32	+10	40	
6	PSPS	27	9	10	8	50	45	+5	37	
7	PSMS	27	9	9	9	33	31	+2	36	
8	Persikad	27	9	7	11	39	45	−6	34	
9	Persekat (R)	27	6	9	12	22	37	−15	27	Qualification for the relegation play-off
10	Sriwijaya (R)	27	0	2	25	15	93	−78	2	Relegation to the 2026–27 Liga Nusantara

Source: Championship 2025–26
Rules for classification: 1) Points; 2) Head-to-head points; 3) Head-to-head goal difference; 4) Head-to-head goals scored; 5) Goal difference; 6) Goals scored; 7) Fair-play points; 8) Draw.
(C) Champions; (O) Promotion play-off winners; (P) Promoted; (R) Relegated

Pos	Team	Pld	W	D	L	GF	GA	GD	Pts	Promotion, qualification or relegation
1	PSS (P)	27	16	8	3	53	19	+34	56 (Note: Head-to-head points: PSS 5, Persipura 2.)	Promotion to the 2026–27 Super League and qualification for the final
2	Persipura	27	17	5	5	44	17	+27	56	Qualification for the promotion play-off
3	Barito Putera	27	15	8	4	41	18	+23	53	
4	Kendal Tornado	27	15	5	7	47	21	+26	50	
5	Deltras	27	13	3	11	39	33	+6	42	
6	Persela	27	11	8	8	34	26	+8	41	
7	Persiku	27	7	6	14	35	41	−6	27	
8	PSIS	27	6	5	16	22	50	−28	23	
9	Persiba (X)	27	4	7	16	24	43	−19	19	Qualification for the relegation play-off
10	Persipal (R)	27	0	7	20	19	90	−71	7	Relegation to the 2026–27 Liga Nusantara

Source: Championship 2025–26
Rules for classification: 1) Points; 2) Head-to-head points; 3) Head-to-head goal difference; 4) Head-to-head goals scored; 5) Goal difference; 6) Goals scored; 7) Fair-play points; 8) Draw.
(P) Promoted; (R) Relegated; (X) Relegation play-off winners

==== Liga Nusantara ====
Pos	Team	Pld	W	D	L	GF	GA	GD	Pts	Qualification or relegation
1	Dejan (P)	12	10	2	0	30	3	+27	32	Qualification to the knockout round
2	Batavia	12	5	4	3	17	5	+12	19	Qualification to the knockout round
3	Nusantara Lampung	12	3	4	5	10	16	−6	13	
4	Persipa	12	2	4	6	7	15	−8	10	
5	PSDS (R)	12	2	2	8	6	31	−25	8	Qualification to the relegation play-offs
6	Persikabo 1973 (W, R)	0	0	0	0	0	0	0	0	Withdrew from the competition

Source: Liga Nusantara 2025–26
Rules for classification: 1) Points; 2) Head-to-head points; 3) Head-to-head goal difference; 4) Head-to-head goals scored; 5) Goal difference; 6) Goals scored; 7) Fair-play points; 8) Draw.
(P) Promoted; (R) Relegated; (W) Withdrew

Pos	Team	Pld	W	D	L	GF	GA	GD	Pts	Qualification or relegation
1	PSGC (O, P)	15	9	4	2	23	11	+12	31	Qualification to the knockout round
2	Pekanbaru	15	5	7	3	18	16	+2	22	Qualification to the knockout round
3	Persikota	15	6	3	6	19	23	−4	21	
4	Tri Brata Rafflesia	15	6	1	8	21	23	−2	19	
5	Persitara (X)	15	4	5	6	15	17	−2	17	Qualification to the relegation play-offs
6	Perserang (R)	15	2	6	7	12	18	−6	12	Relegation to the 2026–27 Liga 4

Source: Liga Nusantara 2025–26
Rules for classification: 1) Points; 2) Head-to-head points; 3) Head-to-head goal difference; 4) Head-to-head goals scored; 5) Goal difference; 6) Goals scored; 7) Fair-play points; 8) Draw.
(O) Promotion play-off winner; (P) Promoted; (R) Relegated; (X) Relegation play-off winners

Pos	Team	Pld	W	D	L	GF	GA	GD	Pts	Qualification or relegation
1	Persika Karanganyar	12	7	2	3	21	11	+10	23	Qualification to the knockout round
2	RANS Nusantara (C, P)	12	6	2	4	14	14	0	20	Qualification to the knockout round
3	Persibo	12	5	3	4	13	13	0	18	
4	Persinab Sang Maestro	12	3	6	3	15	14	+1	15	
5	Persikutim United (X)	12	1	3	8	8	19	−11	6	Qualification to the relegation play-offs
6	Persewar (W, R)	0	0	0	0	0	0	0	0	Withdrew from the competition

Source: Liga Nusantara 2025–26
Rules for classification: 1) Points; 2) Head-to-head points; 3) Head-to-head goal difference; 4) Head-to-head goals scored; 5) Goal difference; 6) Goals scored; 7) Fair-play points; 8) Draw.
(C) Champions; (P) Promoted; (R) Relegated; (W) Withdrew; (X) Relegation play-off winners

Pos	Team	Pld	W	D	L	GF	GA	GD	Pts	Qualification or relegation
1	Persekabpas	15	8	2	5	15	13	+2	26	Qualification to the knockout round
2	Persiba Bantul	15	6	5	4	20	15	+5	23	Qualification to the knockout round
3	Perseden	15	7	1	7	19	19	0	22 (Note: Head-to-head points: Perseden 6, Gresik United 3.)	
4	Gresik United	15	7	1	7	16	15	+1	22	
5	Persebata (R)	15	5	3	7	13	16	−3	18	Qualification to the relegation play-offs
6	Waanal Brothers (R)	15	5	2	8	18	23	−5	17	Relegation to the 2026–27 Liga 4

Source: Liga Nusantara 2025–26
Rules for classification: 1) Points; 2) Head-to-head points; 3) Head-to-head goal difference; 4) Head-to-head goals scored; 5) Goal difference; 6) Goals scored; 7) Fair-play points; 8) Draw.
(R) Relegated

== AFC Competitions ==
=== AFC Champions League Two ===
==== Group F ====
Pos	Team	Pld	W	D	L	GF	GA	GD	Pts	Qualification	PSB	BKU	LCS	SEL
1	(Indonesia) Persib	6	4	1	1	11	6	+5	13	Advance to round of 16	—	1–0	1–1	2–0
2	(Thailand) Bangkok United	6	3	1	2	8	7	+1	10 (Note: Head-to-head points: Bangkok United 6, Lion City Sailors 0.)	Advance to round of 16	0–2	—	1–0	1–1
3	(Singapore) Lion City Sailors	6	3	1	2	10	8	+2	10		3–2	1–2	—	4–2
4	(Malaysia) Selangor	6	0	1	5	7	15	−8	1		2–3	2–4	0–1	—

Source: ACL2
Rules for classification: Tiebreakers

==== Knockout stage ====
11 February 2026 R16	Ratchaburi (Thailand)	3–0	(Indonesia) Persib	Dragon Solar Park, Ratchaburi
19:15 UTC+7	Tana 5', 84'; Mutombo 53'	Report		Attendance: 5,844; Referee: Ahmed Eisa Darwish (United Arab Emirates)

18 February 2026 R16	Persib (Indonesia)	1–0	(Thailand) Ratchaburi	Gelora Bandung Lautan Api Stadium, Bandung
19:15 UTC+7	Jung 40'	Report		Attendance: 26,406; Referee: Majed Al-Shamrani (Saudi Arabia)

Ratchaburi won 3–1 on aggregate.

=== AFC Challenge League ===
==== Group E ====
Pos	Team	Pld	W	D	L	GF	GA	GD	Pts	Qualification	DUB	PPC	TNC	SNU
1	(Indonesia) Dewa United Banten (H)	3	2	1	0	9	2	+7	7	Advance to Quarter-finals		1–1	4–0	4–1
2	(Cambodia) Phnom Penh Crown	3	2	1	0	7	4	+3	7	Advance to Quarter-finals			3–2	3–1
3	(Chinese Taipei) Tainan City	3	1	0	2	4	8	−4	3					2–1
4	(Myanmar) Shan United	3	0	0	3	3	9	−6	0					

Source: AFC
(H) Hosts

==== Knockout stage ====
5 March 2026 QF	Manila Digger (Philippines)	v	(Indonesia) Dewa United Banten	Manila
20:30 UTC+8				Stadium: Rizal Memorial Stadium

12 March 2026 QF	Dewa United Banten (Indonesia)	v	(Philippines) Manila Digger	Tangerang
20:30 UTC+7				Stadium: Indomilk Arena
