= Marsela Awi =

Indonesian footballer

Personal information
- Full name: Marsela Yuliana Awi
- Date of birth: 10 May 2003 (age 23)
- Place of birth: Manokwari, Indonesia
- Position: Forward

Team information
- Current team: Garudayaksa
- Number: 18

Senior career*
| Years | Team | Apps | (Gls) |
| 2021–2023 | Toli | 7 | (7) |
| 2023–2024 | Papua (PON) | | |
| 2024–2026 | Toli | | |
| 2026 | S'Amuser | | |
| 2026– | Garudayaksa | 2 | (0) |

International career^{‡}
| 2022–2023 | Indonesia U20 | 12 | (6) |
| 2022– | Indonesia | 33 | (4) |
- * Club domestic league appearances and goals ‡ National team caps and goals as of 9 August 2025

Marsela Yuliana Awi (born 23 March 2004) is an Indonesian footballer who plays as a forward for Indonesia Women's League club Garudayaksa and the Indonesia national team.

== Club career ==
Awi has played for Asprov Papua in Indonesia.

== International career ==
Awi represented Indonesia at the 2022 AFC Women's Asian Cup.

== Career statistics ==
=== International ===
As of 15 July 2023
Indonesia score listed first, score column indicates score after each Awi goal

List of international under-20 goals scored by Marsela Awi
| No. | Date | Venue | Opponent | Score | Result | Competition |
|---|---|---|---|---|---|---|
| 1 | 26 July 2022 | Gelora Sriwijaya Stadium, Palembang, Indonesia | Vietnam | 1–0 | 1–2 | 2022 AFF U-18 Women's Championship |
| 2 | 11 March 2023 | Việt Trì Stadium, Việt Trì, Vietnam | Singapore | 2–0 | 4–0 | 2024 AFC U-20 Women's Asian Cup qualification |
| 3 | 5 July 2023 | Gelora Sriwijaya Stadium, Palembang, Indonesia | Timor-Leste | 1–0 | 7–0 | 2023 AFF U-19 Women's Championship |
| 4 | 5 July 2023 | Gelora Sriwijaya Stadium, Palembang, Indonesia | Timor-Leste | 5–0 | 7–0 | 2023 AFF U-19 Women's Championship |
| 5 | 9 July 2023 | Gelora Sriwijaya Stadium, Palembang, Indonesia | Cambodia | 2–0 | 5–0 | 2023 AFF U-19 Women's Championship |
| 6 | 15 July 2023 | Gelora Sriwijaya Stadium, Palembang, Indonesia | Myanmar | 1–1 | 1(2)–1(4) | 2023 AFF U-19 Women's Championship |

As of 11 July 2024
Indonesia score listed first, score column indicates score after each Awi goal

List of international goals scored by Marsela Awi
| No. | Date | Venue | Opponent | Score | Result | Competition |
|---|---|---|---|---|---|---|
| 1 | 10 October 2022 | Jalan Besar Stadium, Jalan Besar, Singapore | Singapore | 1–0 | 2–1 | Friendly |
| 2 | 28 May 2024 | Gelora Madya Stadium, Jakarta, Indonesia | Singapore | 1–0 | 5–1 | Friendly |
| 3 | 28 May 2024 | Gelora Madya Stadium, Jakarta, Indonesia | Singapore | 3–1 | 5–1 | Friendly |
| 4 | 11 July 2024 | Hong Kong Football Club Stadium, Hong Kong | Hong Kong | 2–3 | 2–3 | Friendly |

== Honours ==
Toli

- Pertiwi Cup: 2021–22
