= 2025 ASEAN U-19 Women's Championship =

Tournament details
- Host country: Vietnam
- City: Ho Chi Minh City
- Dates: 9–18 June
- Teams: 8 (from 1 sub-confederation)
- Venue: 4 (in 1 host city)

Final positions
- Champions: Thailand (3rd title)
- Runners-up: Vietnam
- Third place: Indonesia
- Fourth place: Myanmar

Tournament statistics
- Matches played: 16
- Goals scored: 74 (4.63 per match)
- Top scorer(s): (Thailand) Kurisara Limpawanich (6 goals each)
- Best player: (Thailand) Kurisara Limpawanich
- Best goalkeeper: (Thailand) Athima Boonprakanpai

The 2025 ASEAN U-19 Women's Championship was the 4th edition of the ASEAN U-19 Women's Championship, an international women's youth football tournament organised by ASEAN Football Federation (AFF). It was hosted by Vietnam from 9 to 18 June.

== Participant teams ==
There was no qualification, and all entrants participated or advanced to the final tournament. The following 8 teams from AFF entered the tournament:

Team	Association	Appearance	Previous best performance
Cambodia	FF Cambodia	2nd	Group stage (2022, 2023)
Indonesia	FA Indonesia	2nd	Fourth place (2023)
Laos	Lao FF	1st	Group stage (2023)
Malaysia	FA Malaysia	2nd	Group stage (2022, 2023)
Myanmar	Myanmar FF	3rd	Third place (2014, 2023)
Timor-Leste	FF Timor-Leste	2nd	Group Stage (2014, 2023)
Thailand	FA Thailand	3rd	Winners (2014, 2023)
Vietnam	Vietnam FF	3rd	Runner-up (2014, 2022, 2023)

Did not enter
Australia
Brunei
Philippines
Singapore

== Venues ==
The competition will be played in three venues, all in Ho Chi Minh City.

Ho Chi Minh City
Thống Nhất Stadium	Đạt Đức Stadium	District 8 Stadium	Phú Thọ Stadium
Capacity: 20,000	Capacity: 3,500	Capacity: 1,000	Capacity: 500
2025 ASEAN U-19 Women's Championship is located in Ho Chi Minh City

== Group stage ==
- All times are local (UTC+7).

=== Group A ===
Pos	Team	Pld	W	D	L	GF	GA	GD	Pts	Qualification
1	Vietnam (H)	3	3	0	0	16	0	+16	9	Advance to knockout stage
2	Myanmar	3	2	0	1	13	2	+11	6	Advance to knockout stage
3	Laos	3	1	0	2	2	14	−12	3	
4	Timor-Leste	3	0	0	3	0	15	−15	0	

Source: AFF
Rules for classification: 1) points; 2) head-to-head; 3) goal difference; 4) goals scored; 5) penalty shoot-out; 6) disciplinary points; 7) drawing of lots.
(H) Hosts
9 June 2025
15:00

Timor-Leste	0–2	Laos
	Report	Keo Onsy 18', 85'

Thống Nhất Stadium, Ho Chi Minh City
9 June 2025
18:30

Vietnam	2–0	Myanmar
Nguyễn Thị Thùy Linh 35'; Ngân Thị Thanh Hiếu 40'	Report

Thống Nhất Stadium, Ho Chi Minh City

11 June 2025
15:00

Myanmar	6–0	Laos
Daisy Aung 18', 46'; Su Su Khin 27', 55'; Yin Loon Eain 43'; Aye Aye Soe 72'

Thống Nhất Stadium, Ho Chi Minh City
11 June 2025
18:30

Vietnam	6–0	Timor-Leste
Đỗ Thị Thúy Nga 10', 25'; Lê Thị Trang 34'; Đậu Nguyễn Quỳnh Anh 62'; Nguyễn Thị Quý 77'; Trương Thị Hoài Trinh 85'

Thống Nhất Stadium, Ho Chi Minh City

13 June 2025
15:00

Myanmar	7–0	Timor-Leste
Su Su Khin 5'; Moe Pwint Phyu 20'; Daisy Aung 23'; Pin Myint Yan 41'; Win Sandar 45'; Hnin Sandar Win 67'; Ya Min Phyu 79'	Report

District 8 Stadium, Ho Chi Minh City
13 June 2025
15:00

Vietnam	8–0	Laos
Lê Thị Trang 5', 9'; Nguyễn Thu Trang 14'; Nguyễn Vĩnh Thục Nghi 18'; Lưu Hoàng Vân 29', 34', 77'; Trương Thị Hoài Trinh 47'	Report

Thống Nhất Stadium, Ho Chi Minh City

=== Group B ===
Pos	Team	Pld	W	D	L	GF	GA	GD	Pts	Qualification
1	Thailand	3	3	0	0	17	2	+15	9	Advance to knockout stage
2	Indonesia	3	1	1	1	6	7	−1	4	Advance to knockout stage
3	Malaysia	3	1	0	2	5	11	−6	3	
4	Cambodia	3	0	1	2	1	9	−8	1	

Updated to match(es) played on 11 June 2025. Source: AFF
Rules for classification: 1) points; 2) head-to-head; 3) goal difference; 4) goals scored; 5) penalty shoot-out; 6) disciplinary points; 7) drawing of lots.
9 June 2025
15:00

Thailand	6–1	Indonesia
Ruttawalin 7'; Kurisara 16'; Manita 25'; Prichakorn 65'; Phatcharaphorn 70'; Rasita 77'	Report	Nasywa R. 90+6'

District 8 Stadium, Ho Chi Minh City
9 June 2025
15:00

Malaysia	4–0	Cambodia
Ku Nuwairah 14', 49'; Kaseh Carlmila 39', 70'	Report

Đạt Đức Stadium, Ho Chi Minh City

11 June 2025
15:00

Thailand	7–1	Malaysia
Nachanok 2'; Kurisara 14', 69'; Arecha 30' (o.g.); Ruttawalin 52'; Manita 86'; Kessirin 90+4'		Kaseh Carlmila 3'

District 8 Stadium, Ho Chi Minh City
11 June 2025
15:00

Indonesia	1–1	Cambodia
Jazlyn F. 12'		Moa 7'

Đạt Đức Stadium, Ho Chi Minh City

13 June 2025
15:00

Cambodia	0–4	Thailand
		Parichat 45+5'; Rinyaphat 53', 86'; Pinyaphat 86'

Đạt Đức Stadium, Ho Chi Minh City
13 June 2025
15:00

Indonesia	4–0	Malaysia
Nasywa F. 9'; Hopper 28'; Jezlyn A. 77'; Allya A. 80'

Phú Thọ Stadium, Ho Chi Minh City

== Knockout stage ==
In the knockout stage, the penalty shoot-out was used to decide the winner if necessary.

All times are local, ICT (UTC+7).

Semi-finals
16 June — Ho Chi Minh City
Thailand	5
Myanmar	1
16 June — Ho Chi Minh City
Vietnam	4
Indonesia	0

Final
18 June — Ho Chi Minh City
Thailand	3
Vietnam	1
Third place play-off
18 June — Ho Chi Minh City
Myanmar	0 (5)
Indonesia (p)	0 (6)

=== Semi-finals ===
16 June 2025
15:00

Thailand	5–1	Myanmar
Rasita 12'; Nachanok 18', 42'; Kurisara 34', 69'	Report	Su Su Khin 89'

Thống Nhất Stadium, Ho Chi Minh City
16 June 2025
18:30

Vietnam	4–0	Indonesia
Tạ Thị Hồng Minh 10'; Lưu Hoàng Vân 36', 53'; Trương Thị Hoài Trinh 47'	Report

Thống Nhất Stadium, Ho Chi Minh City

=== Third place play-off ===
18 June 2025
15:00

Myanmar	0–0	Indonesia
Penalties
Yu Ya Naing (penalty scored); Daisy Aung (penalty scored); Yin Loon Eain (penalty scored); Nan Cho Hmwe (penalty missed); Yu Yu Naing (penalty scored); Sandar Lin (penalty scored); Ya Min Phyu (penalty missed)	5–6	(penalty scored) Auliah; (penalty scored) Nasywa Fattah; (penalty scored) Gea; (penalty missed) Shifana; (penalty scored) Nasywa Rambe; (penalty scored) Jezlyn; (penalty scored) Nabyla

Thống Nhất Stadium, Ho Chi Minh City

=== Final ===
18 June 2025
18:30

Thailand	3–1	Vietnam
Rasita 27'; Kurisara 62' (pen.); Phatcharaphorn 69'		Đỗ Thị Thúy Nga 51' (pen.)

Thống Nhất Stadium, Ho Chi Minh City

== Goalscorers ==
There were 74 goals scored in 16 matches, for an average of 4.62 goals per match.

6 goals

- (Thailand) Kurisara Limpawanich

5 goals

- (Vietnam) Lưu Hoàng Vân

4 goals

- (Myanmar) Su Su Khin

3 goals

- (Malaysia) Kaseh Carlmila
- (Myanmar) Daisy Aung
- (Vietnam) Lê Thị Trang
- (Vietnam) Trương Thị Hoài Trinh
- (Vietnam) Đỗ Thị Thúy Nga
- (Thailand) Rasita Taobao
- (Thailand) Nachanok Kosonsaksakun

2 goals

- (Laos) Anna Keo Onsy
- (Malaysia) Ku Nuwairah
- (Thailand) Manita Noyvach
- (Thailand) Ruttawalin Intabumrung
- (Thailand) Rinyaphat Moondong
- (Thailand) Phatcharaphorn Khuchuea

1 goal

- (Cambodia) Moa Ratha
- (Indonesia) Nasywa Zetira Rambe
- (Indonesia) Nasywa Salsabilla Fattah
- (Indonesia) Sydney Hopper
- (Indonesia) Jezlyn Kayla Azkha
- (Indonesia) Jazlyn Kayla Firyal
- (Indonesia) Allya Putri
- (Myanmar) Yin Loon Eain
- (Myanmar) Aye Aye Soe
- (Myanmar) Moe Pwint Phyu
- (Myanmar) Pin Myint Yan
- (Myanmar) Win Sandar
- (Myanmar) Hnin Sandar Win
- (Myanmar) Ya Min Phyu
- (Thailand) Kessirin Boonmatun
- (Thailand) Phatcharaphorn Khuchuea
- (Thailand) Prichakorn Kruechuenchom
- (Thailand) Parichat Thongrong
- (Thailand) Pinyaphat Klinklai
- (Vietnam) Đậu Nguyễn Quỳnh Anh
- (Vietnam) Nguyễn Thu Trang
- (Vietnam) Ngân Thị Thanh Hiếu
- (Vietnam) Nguyễn Thị Quý
- (Vietnam) Nguyễn Thị Thùy Linh
- (Vietnam) Nguyễn Vĩnh Thục Nghi
- (Vietnam) Tạ Thị Hồng Minh

1 own goal

- (Malaysia) Arecha Pansie Efandi (against Thailand)
