= 2013 AFC U-19 Women's Championship qualification =

Tournament details
- Teams: 13 (from 1 confederation)

The 2013 AFC U-19 Women's Championship qualification was a women's under-19 football competition which decided final participating team of the 2013 AFC U-19 Women's Championship.

Only one team qualified to play in the final tournament, including South Korea, North Korea, China PR, Australia, and Japan, who qualified directly as the top 5 finishers of the 2011 AFC U-19 Women's Championship.

The top three teams of the final tournament qualified for the 2014 FIFA U-20 Women's World Cup in Canada.

== Competition format ==
	Teams entering in this round	Teams advancing from previous round	Competition format
First qualifying round (12 teams)	teams not in the top 8 of last tournament		3 groups of 4 teams, hosted by Malaysia, Jordan, and Philippines
Second qualifying round (8 teams)	teams placed 6 and 7 in last tournament: Thailand; Vietnam	3 group winners and 3 group runners-up from 1st qualifying round	2 groups of 4 teams, and a play-off between each group winner hosted by Vietnam
Final tournament (6 teams)	top 5 finishers from last tournament: Japan; North Korea; China; South Korea; Australia	1 play-off winner from 2nd qualifying round	round-robin tournament

The competition format of the qualification is as follows:

Seeding
The sixth and the seventh placed teams in the previous edition (Thailand and Vietnam) received byes for the second qualification round.
First qualification round
12 teams are divided into three groups of four, where each group plays a single round-robin tournament. Top two teams in each group (total 6 teams) will advance to the second qualification round. Two of the three groups are consisted of central, south and west Asian teams (8 teams), while the other group consists of east and southeast Asian teams (4 teams).
Second qualification round
The six teams from the first qualification round and the two teams received the byes are divided into two groups of four, where each group plays a single round-robin tournament. Group winners in the groups will play a play-off match where the winner will qualify for the final tournament.

The draw for the first and the second qualification round is conducted in March 2012 at the AFC House in Kuala Lumpur, Malaysia.

If two or more teams are equal on points on completion of the group matches, the following criteria were applied to determine the rankings.

1. Greater number of points obtained in the group matches between the teams concerned;
2. Goal difference resulting from the group matches between the teams concerned;
3. Greater number of goals scored in the group matches between the teams concerned;
4. Goal difference in all the group matches;
5. Greater number of goals scored in all the group matches;
6. Kicks from the penalty mark if only two teams are involved and they are both on the field of play;
7. Fewer score calculated according to the number of yellow and red cards received in the group matches;
8. Drawing of lots.

== First round ==
Top two teams of each group will advance to the Second round.

=== Group A ===
All matches are held in Malacca, Malaysia (UTC+8).

Team	Pld	W	D	L	GF	GA	GD	Pts
India	2	2	0	0	2	0	+2	6
Uzbekistan	2	1	0	1	2	1	+1	3
Bangladesh	2	0	0	2	0	3	−3	0

- Kyrgyzstan withdrew before playing any match.
20 October 2012
17:00

India	1–0	Bangladesh
Nikhila 76'	Report

Hang Jebat Stadium, Malacca
Attendance: 30
Referee: Kajiyama Fusako (Japan)

22 October 2012
17:00

Bangladesh	0–2	Uzbekistan
	Report	Selime 20'; Mahliyo 56'

Hang Jebat Stadium, Malacca
Attendance: 50
Referee: Saltanat Noroozi (IR Iran)

24 October 2012
17:00

India	1–0	Uzbekistan
Rawat 22'	Report

Hang Jebat Stadium, Malacca
Attendance: 20
Referee: Praew Semaksuk (Thailand)

=== Group B ===
All matches are held in Amman, Jordan (UTC+2).

Team	Pld	W	D	L	GF	GA	GD	Pts
Jordan	3	3	0	0	14	2	+12	9
Iran	3	2	0	1	22	5	+17	6
Tajikistan	3	0	1	2	4	17	−13	1
Palestine	3	0	1	2	2	18	−16	1

18 October 2012
14:00

Iran	12–2	Tajikistan
Rashti 4'; Naraghi 10', 18', 31', 58', 76', 78'; Zohrabi Nia 25'; Rahimi 38' (pen.), 47', 50'; Samaneh 90+1'	Report	Mehrangezi 45+1'; Laylo 79'

Petra Stadium, Amman
Attendance: 50
Referee: Mai Hoang Trang (Vietnam)
18 October 2012
18:00

Jordan	8–0	Palestine
Khalil 10'; Sweilem 15', 25', 57'; Al-Masri 20', 43'; Al-Zagha 39'; Al-Momani 73'	Report

Petra Stadium, Amman
Attendance: 350
Referee: Kim Sook-Hee (Korea Republic)

20 October 2012
14:00

Palestine	0–8	Iran
	Report	Rouzbahan 7'; Rashti 12', 84'; Naraghi 22', 60', 64'; Zohrabi Nia 29'; Rahimi 53'

Petra Stadium, Amman
Attendance: 50
Referee: Qian Liang (China PR)
20 October 2012
18:00

Tajikistan	0–3	Jordan
	Report	Al-Zagha 18'; Al-Momani 31', 51'

Petra Stadium, Amman
Referee: Sachiko Yamagishi (Japan)

22 October 2012
14:00

Tajikistan	2–2	Palestine
Madina 50'; Makhvash 65'	Report	Owda 58', 90+5'

Petra Stadium, Amman
Attendance: 50
Referee: Mai Hoang Trang (Vietnam)
22 October 2012
18:00

Jordan	3–2	Iran
Ai. Al-Sufy 4', 51'; Sweilem 76'	Report	Rahimi 24', 71'

Petra Stadium, Amman
Attendance: 500
Referee: Sachiko Yamagishi (Japan)

=== Group C ===
All matches are held in Manila, Philippines (UTC+8).

Team	Pld	W	D	L	GF	GA	GD	Pts
Myanmar	3	3	0	0	15	1	+14	9
Chinese Taipei	3	2	0	1	7	3	+4	6
Philippines	3	1	0	2	2	5	−3	3
Hong Kong	3	0	0	3	0	15	−15	0

17 October 2012
15:00

Chinese Taipei	1–3	Myanmar
Pan Yen-hsin 34'	Report	May Thu Kyaw 20', 65'; Win Theingi Tun 83'

Rizal Memorial Stadium, Manila
Attendance: 80
Referee: Ri Hong Sil (Korea DPR)
17 October 2012
18:00

Philippines	2–0	Hong Kong
Kadil 71'; Reyes 78'	Report

Rizal Memorial Stadium, Manila
Attendance: 350
Referee: Pannipar Kamnueng (Thailand)

19 October 2012
15:00

Hong Kong	0–5	Chinese Taipei
	Report	Chen Yi-ping 18', 62'; Lo Tien-yu 66', 71'; Lin Yi-ying 68'

Rizal Memorial Stadium, Manila
Attendance: 45
Referee: Shiva Yari (IR Iran)
19 October 2012
18:00

Myanmar	4–0	Philippines
Nilar Win 15', 85'; May Thu Kyaw 60'; Win Theingi Tun 61'	Report

Rizal Memorial Stadium, Manila
Attendance: 230
Referee: Maria Piedade Rebello (India)

21 October 2012
15:00

Myanmar	8–0	Hong Kong
May Thu Kyaw 20', 23', 39'; Nilar Win 21', 36', 82'; Win Theingi Tun 59', 59'	Report

Rizal Memorial Stadium, Manila
Attendance: 55
Referee: Maria Piedade Rebello (India)
21 October 2012
18:00

Philippines	0–1	Chinese Taipei
	Report	Pan Yen-Hsin 35'

Rizal Memorial Stadium, Manila
Attendance: 200
Referee: Pannipar Kamnueng (Thailand)

== Second round ==
Top two teams of each group in first qualification round would join Thailand and Vietnam in the second round. Group winners in the groups would play a play-off match where the winner will qualify for the final tournament.

All matches were held in Ho Chi Minh City, Vietnam (UTC+7).

Qualified teams

- Chinese Taipei
- India
- Iran
- Jordan
- Myanmar
- Uzbekistan

=== Group A ===
Team	Pld	W	D	L	GF	GA	GD	Pts
Thailand	3	2	1	0	9	3	+6	7
Iran	3	1	2	0	6	4	+2	5
Jordan	3	1	0	2	1	5	−4	3
Uzbekistan	3	0	1	2	1	5	−4	1

2 December 2012
16:00

Thailand	3–0	Jordan
Panyosuk 15'; Rukpinij 90+2'; Boontan 90+4'	Report

Thong Nhat Stadium, Ho Chi Minh City
Attendance: 50
Referee: Maria Piedade Rebello (India)
2 December 2012
19:00

Uzbekistan	1–1	Iran
Tulanbaeva 30'	Report	Farmani 59'

Thong Nhat Stadium, Ho Chi Minh City
Attendance: 150
Referee: Qin Liang (China)

4 December 2012
16:00

Jordan	1–0	Uzbekistan
Almasri 89' (pen.)	Report

Thong Nhat Stadium, Ho Chi Minh City
Attendance: 100
Referee: Mai Hoang Trang (Vietnam)
4 December 2012
19:00

Iran	3–3	Thailand
Rahimi 29'; Naraghi 34', 70'	Report	Rukpinij 67'; Anongnat 77'; Phonkhokkruad 86'

Thong Nhat Stadium, Ho Chi Minh City
Attendance: 200
Referee: Sachiko Yamagishi (Japan)

6 December 2012
16:00

Thailand	3–0	Uzbekistan
Alisa 22', 24'; Orapin 55'	Report

Thong Nhat Stadium, Ho Chi Minh City
Attendance: 100
Referee: Qin Liang (China)
6 December 2012
16:00

Iran	2–0	Jordan
Maryam 24'; Seyedeh 35'	Report

Army Stadium, Ho Chi Minh City
Attendance: 100
Referee: Sato Nami (Japan)

=== Group B ===
Team	Pld	W	D	L	GF	GA	GD	Pts
Myanmar	3	2	1	0	11	2	+9	7
Vietnam	3	2	0	1	14	3	+11	6
Chinese Taipei	3	1	1	1	9	4	+5	4
India	3	0	0	3	0	25	−25	0

1 December 2012
16:00

Vietnam	1–2	Myanmar
Nguyễn Thị Mỹ Anh 52'	Report	Khin Nway Nway Shwe 40'; Win Theingi Tun 79'

Thong Nhat Stadium, Ho Chi Minh City
Attendance: 200
Referee: Nami Sato (Japan)
1 December 2012
19:00

Chinese Taipei	7–0	India
Pan Yen-hsin 25'; Lin Hui-wen 30'; Lo Tien-yu 45', 65', 75'; Chen Ya-chun 55'; Ho Hsuan-yi 90'	Report

Thong Nhat Stadium, Ho Chi Minh City
Attendance: 100
Referee: Saltanat Noroozi (I.R. Iran)

3 December 2012
16:00

Myanmar	1–1	Chinese Taipei
Khin Nway Nway Shwe 13'	Report	Chen Yi-ping 61'

Thong Nhat Stadium, Ho Chi Minh City
Attendance: 100
Referee: Pannipar Kamnueng (Thailand)
3 December 2012
19:00

Vietnam	10–0	India
Phạm Hải Yến 11', 20', 27'; Nguyễn Thị Hồng Cúc 15', 67', 76'; Trần Thị Thảo Nguyên 53', 60'; Phan Thị Trang 80', 88'	Report

Thong Nhat Stadium, Ho Chi Minh City
Attendance: 300
Referee: Kim Sook-Hee (Korea Republic)

5 December 2012
16:00

Vietnam	3–1	Chinese Taipei
Vũ Thị Thúy 44'; Phạm Hải Yến 69'	Report	Pan Yi-ting 20' (o.g.); Chen Yi-ping 47'

Thong Nhat Stadium, Ho Chi Minh City
Attendance: 400
Referee: Kim Sook-Hee (Korea Republic)
5 December 2012
16:00

India	0–8	Myanmar
	Report	Win Theingi Tun 9', 45'; Sahoo 18' (o.g.); Khin Nway Nway Shwe 26'; Nilar Win 47', 64', 83'; Aye Aye Moe 61'

Army Stadium, Ho Chi Minh City
Attendance: 50
Referee: Shiva Yari (I.R. Iran)

=== Play-off ===
9 December 2012
19:00

Thailand	0–1	Myanmar
	Report	Lin Ohnmar Tun 67'

Thong Nhat Stadium, Ho Chi Minh City
Attendance: 100
Referee: Sachiko Yamagishi (Japan)

Myanmar qualified for the final tournament.
