= Indonesia women's national under-20 football team =

National association football team

Indonesia women's U-20
- Nickname: Garuda Pertiwi
- Association: PSSI (Football Association of Indonesia)
- Confederation: AFC (Asia)
- Sub-confederation: AFF (Southeast Asia)
- Head coach: Akira Higashiyama
- Captain: Gea Yumanda
- FIFA code: IDN
First colours	Second colours

Biggest win
- Indonesia 7–0 Timor-Leste (Palembang, Indonesia; 5 July 2023)

Biggest defeat
- Indonesia 0–6 India (Việt Trì, Vietnam; 9 March 2023); Indonesia 1–7 Thailand (Palembang, Indonesia; 13 July 2023)

ASEAN U-19 Women's Championship
- Appearances: 3 (first in 2022)
- Best result: Third place (2025)

The Indonesia women's national under-20 football team represents Indonesia in international women's football, and is controlled by the Football Association of Indonesia (PSSI).

== Results and fixtures ==
The following is a list of match results in the last 12 months, as well as any future matches that have been scheduled.

Win Draw Loss Fixture

== Players ==
=== Current squad ===
The following 23 players are called up for the 2026 AFC U-20 Women's Asian Cup qualification.

No.	Pos.	Player	Date of birth (age)	Caps	Goals	Club
23	GK	Gadhiza Asnanza	3 March 2008 (age 18)	3	0	
1	GK	Alleana Ayu Arumy		5	0	(Football Association of Indonesia) Asprov Jabar
18	GK	Edelweiz Auradiva	9 March 2009 (age 17)	1	0	
12	DF	Allya Putri	8 January 2008 (age 18)	5	1	(Football Association of Indonesia)
17	DF	Merisya Ika Hermawan		0	0	(Football Association of Indonesia)
22	DF	Hana Modouw		0	0	(Football Association of Indonesia)
3	DF	Marcelinda Khusna		1	0	(Football Association of Indonesia)
5	DF	Gea Yumanda (captain)	27 June 2006 (age 20)	15	1	(Philippine Football Federation) Makati
4	DF	Jazlyn Kayla	26 August 2010 (age 16)	7	2	(Football Association of Indonesia) Roket
2	DF	Nabila Saputri	4 February 2007 (age 19)	5	0	(Football Association of Indonesia) Persib Bandung
13	MF	Armelia Nur Sava	6 July 2007 (age 19)	7	1	(Football Association of Indonesia)
10	MF	Syafia Chorlienka	25 October 2009 (age 16)	4	0	(Football Association of Indonesia) Arema
19	MF	Nasywa Zetira	1 January 2008 (age 18)	6	1	(Philippine Football Federation) Makati
6	MF	Aulia Arifah	21 March 2008 (age 18)	5	1	(Football Association of Indonesia) Asprov Banten
16	MF	Marcha Egis	28 July 2004 (age 22)	2	0	
21	MF	Maylin Spaeni	26 December 2008 (age 17)	2	0	(Swiss Football Association) FC Zürich Frauen
8	FW	Shifana Nadhifa	28 March 2010 (age 16)	4	1	(Football Association of Indonesia) Bina Sentra Semarang
11	FW	Ayunda Dwi Anggraini	15 January 2006 (age 20)	6	0	(Football Association of Indonesia) Asprov Jatim
20	MF	Adelia Ramadany	27 November 2007 (age 18)	1	0	
7	FW	Jezlyn Kayla	26 August 2010 (age 16)	4	1	(Football Association of Indonesia) Roket
9	FW	Ajeng Sri Handayani	13 December 2006 (age 19)	3	2	(Football Association of Indonesia) Persib Bandung
14	FW	Nasywa Salsabilla		5	1	(Football Association of Indonesia) Persib Bandung
15	FW	Kikka Putri	13 September 2008 (age 18)	2	0	(Football Association of Indonesia) Adhyaksa Kalteng

== Competitive record ==
=== AFC U-20 Women's Asian Cup ===
AFC U-20 Women's Asian Cup record								Qualifications records					
Year	Round	GP	W	D	L	GF	GA	GP	W	D	L	GF	GA
(India) 2002	Did not enter							Did not enter					
(China) 2004	Did not enter							Did not enter					
(Malaysia) 2006	Did not enter							Did not enter					
(China) 2007	Did not enter							Did not enter					
(China) 2009	Did not enter							Did not enter					
(Vietnam) 2011	Did not enter							Did not enter					
(China) 2013	Did not enter							Did not enter					
(China) 2015	Did not enter							Did not enter					
(China) 2017	Did not enter							Did not enter					
(Thailand) 2019	Did not enter							Did not enter					
(Uzbekistan) 2024	Did not qualify							3	1	0	2	4	9
(Thailand) 2026	Did not qualify							3	1	2	0	6	2
(China) 2028	To be determined							To be determined					
(China) 2030	To be determined							To be determined					

=== ASEAN U-19 Women's Championship ===
ASEAN U-19 Women's Championship record
Year	Round	Position	GP	W	D	L	GF	GA
(Thailand) 2014	Did not enter							
(Indonesia) 2022	Group stage	5th	4	2	0	2	3	5
(Indonesia) 2023	Fourth place	4th	5	3	1	1	18	9
(Vietnam) 2025	Third place	3rd	5	1	2	2	6	11
(Myanmar) 2026	To be determined							
Total	Best: Third place	3/3	14	6	3	5	27	25

== See also ==
- Indonesia women's national football team
- Indonesia women's national under-17 football team
