= Vietnam women's national under-20 football team =

National association football team

Vietnam
- Association: Vietnam Football Federation (VFF)
- Confederation: AFC (Asia)
- Sub-confederation: AFF (Southeast Asia)
- Head coach: (Japan) Masahiko Okiyama
- Captain: Lê Thị Bảo Trâm
- Home stadium: Various
- FIFA code: VIE
First colours	Second colours

First international
- Vietnam 17–0 Malaysia (Suzhou, China; 25 May 2004)

Biggest win
- Vietnam 19–0 Timor-Leste (Bangkok, Thailand; 20 August 2014)

Biggest defeat
- Vietnam 0–10 Japan (Tashkent, Uzbekistan; 4 March 2024)

AFC U-20 Women's Asian Cup
- Appearances: 7 (first in 2004)
- Best result: Quarter-final (2004, 2026); Sixth place (2011)

ASEAN U-19 Women's Championship
- Appearances: 4 (first in 2014)
- Best result: Runners-up (2014, 2022, 2023, 2025)

The Vietnam women's national under-20 football team represents Vietnam in international football competitions at the qualifications of AFC U-20 Women's Asian Cup and possible final tournaments if they qualify, as well as any other under-19 women's international football tournaments. It is governed by the Vietnam Football Federation.

== Competitive record ==
=== FIFA U-20 Women's World Cup ===
FIFA U-20 Women's World Cup record
Year	Round	GP	W	D	L	GF	GA
(Canada) 2002	Did not enter						
(Thailand) 2004	Did not qualify						
(Russia) 2006	Did not enter						
(Chile) 2008	Did not qualify						
(Germany) 2010	Did not qualify						
(Japan) 2012	Did not qualify						
(Canada) 2014	Did not qualify						
(Papua New Guinea) 2016	Did not qualify						
(France) 2018	Did not qualify						
(Costa Rica) (Panama) ~~2020~~	Did not qualify and cancelled						
(Costa Rica) 2022	Did not qualify						
(Colombia) 2024	Did not qualify						
(Poland) 2026	Did not qualify						
2028	To be determined						
2030	To be determined						
Total	None	0	0	0	0	0	0

=== AFC U-20 Women's Asian Cup ===
AFC U-20 Women's Asian Cup record
Year	Round	GP	W	D	L	GF	GA
(India) 2002	Did not enter						
(China) 2004	Quarter-finals	3	1	0	2	18	9
(Malaysia) 2006	Did not enter						
(China) 2007	Did not qualify						
(China) 2009	Group stage	3	1	0	2	2	10
(Vietnam) 2011	6th place	5	0	0	5	5	21
(China) 2013	Did not qualify						
(China) 2015	Did not qualify						
(China) 2017	Group stage	3	0	0	3	2	18
(Thailand) 2019	Group stage	3	1	0	2	2	4
(Uzbekistan) ~~2022~~	Canceled due to COVID-19 pandemic						
(Uzbekistan) 2024	Group stage	3	0	0	3	1	22
(Thailand) 2026	Quarter-finals	4	1	0	3	2	11
(China) 2028	To be determined						
(China) 2030	To be determined						
Total:7/12	Quarter-finals	24	4	0	20	32	95

AFC U-20 Women's Asian Cup History
Season	Round	Opponent	Scores	Result	Venue
2004	Group stage	Malaysia	17–0	Won	Suzhou, China
2004	Group stage	Japan	0–4	Loss	Suzhou, China
2004	Quarter-finals	South Korea	1–5	Loss	Suzhou, China
2009	Group stage	South Korea	0–3	Loss	Wuhan, China
2009	Group stage	North Korea	0–6	Loss	Wuhan, China
2009	Group stage	Thailand	2–1	Won	Wuhan, China
2011	Final round	Australia	3–4	Loss	Ho Chi Minh City, Vietnam
2011	Final round	China	1–2	Loss	Ho Chi Minh City, Vietnam
2011	Final round	North Korea	0–5	Loss	Ho Chi Minh City, Vietnam
2011	Final round	South Korea	1–4	Loss	Ho Chi Minh City, Vietnam
2011	Final round	Japan	0–6	Loss	Ho Chi Minh City, Vietnam
2017	Group stage	Japan	0–8	Loss	Nanjing, China
2017	Group stage	South Korea	0–5	Loss	Nanjing, China
2017	Group stage	Australia	2–5	Loss	Nanjing, China
2019	Group stage	Thailand	2–0	Won	Chonburi, Thailand
2019	Group stage	North Korea	0–3	Loss	Chonburi, Thailand
2019	Group stage	Australia	0–1	Loss	Chonburi, Thailand
2024	Group stage	Japan	0–10	Loss	Tashkent, Uzbekistan
2024	Group stage	North Korea	0–6	Loss	Tashkent, Uzbekistan
2024	Group stage	China	1–6	Loss	Tashkent, Uzbekistan
2026	Group stage	China	0–3	Loss	Nonthaburi, Thailand
2026	Group stage	Thailand	1–4	Loss	Pathum Thani, Thailand
2026	Group stage	Bangladesh	1–0	Won	Nonthaburi, Thailand
2026	Quarter-finals	Japan	0–4	Loss	Pathum Thani, Thailand

=== ASEAN U-19 Women's Championship ===
ASEAN U-19 Women's Championship record
Year	Round	GP	W	D	L	GF	GA
(Thailand) 2014	Runner-up	5	2	2	1	31	3
(Indonesia) 2022	Runner-up	6	5	0	1	23	4
(Indonesia) 2023	Runner-up	4	3	0	1	14	3
(Vietnam) 2025	Runner-up	5	4	0	1	21	3
(Myanmar) 2027	To be determined						
Total	Runner-up	20	14	2	4	89	13

ASEAN U-19 Women's Championship history
Season	Round	Opponent	Scores	Result	Venue
2014	Group stage	Singapore	10–0	Won	Bangkok, Thailand
2014	Group stage	Timor-Leste	19–0	Won	Bangkok, Thailand
2014	Group stage	Thailand	1–2	Loss	Bangkok, Thailand
2014	Group stage	Myanmar	1–1	Draw	Bangkok, Thailand
2014	Final	Thailand	0–0 a.e.t (pens. 3–5)	Loss	Bangkok, Thailand
2022	Group stage	Singapore	9–0	Won	Palembang, Indonesia
2022	Group stage	Indonesia	2–1	Won	Palembang, Indonesia
2022	Group stage	Cambodia	7–0	Won	Palembang, Indonesia
2022	Group stage	Thailand	1–0	Won	Palembang, Indonesia
2022	Semi-finals	Myanmar	4–1	Won	Palembang, Indonesia
2022	Final	Australia	0–2	Loss	Palembang, Indonesia
2023	Group stage	Singapore	5–0	Won	Palembang, Indonesia
2023	Group stage	Malaysia	6–0	Won	Palembang, Indonesia
2023	Semi-finals	Myanmar	2–1	Won	Palembang, Indonesia
2023	Final	Thailand	1–2 a.e.t	Loss	Palembang, Indonesia
2025	Group stage	Myanmar	2–0	Won	Ho Chi Minh City, Vietnam
2025	Group stage	Timor-Leste	6–0	Won	Ho Chi Minh City, Vietnam
2025	Group stage	Laos	8–0	Won	Ho Chi Minh City, Vietnam
2025	Semi-finals	Indonesia	4–0	Won	Ho Chi Minh City, Vietnam
2025	Final	Thailand	1–3	Loss	Ho Chi Minh City, Vietnam

== Results and fixtures ==
Win Draw Lost Fixture

The following is a list of match results in the last 12 months, as well as any future matches that have been scheduled.

=== 2026 ===
24 March Friendly	Vietnam	4–0	Uzbekistan	Ho Chi Minh City, Vietnam
--:-- UTC+7	Lê Thị Trang 23', 33'; Đào Khánh Vy 44'; Lê Hồng Yêu 60'	Report

27 March Friendly	Vietnam	1–1	Uzbekistan	Ho Chi Minh City, Vietnam
--:-- UTC+7	Đỗ Thị Thúy Nga 40'	Report	?

1 April Asian Cup group stage	China	3–0	Vietnam	Nonthaburi, Thailand
16:00 UTC+7	Zheng Lu 39', 44'; Zeng Yujia 77'	Report		Stadium: Nonthaburi Province Stadium; Attendance: 51; Referee: Alesar Baddour (Syria)

4 April Asian Cup group stage	Vietnam	1–4	Thailand	Pathum Thani, Thailand
20:00 UTC+7	Nguyễn Thị Thùy Linh 51'	Report	Kurisara 11', 41'; Rinyaphat 21', 90+3'	Stadium: Thammasat Stadium; Attendance: 418; Referee: Pak Un-jong (North Korea)

7 April Asian Cup group stage	Vietnam	1–0	Bangladesh	Nonthaburi, Thailand
20:00 UTC+7	Nguyễn Thị Thùy Linh 49'	Report		Stadium: Nonthaburi Province Stadium; Attendance: 36; Referee: Yang Shu-ting (Chinese Taipei)

11 April Asian Cup quarter-finals	Japan	4–0	Vietnam	Pathum Thani, Thailand
20:00 UTC+7	Itamura 18', 61'; Tago 45+1'; Fukushima 45+2'	Report		Stadium: Pathum Thani Stadium; Attendance: 86; Referee: Alissar Baddour (Syria)

== Players ==
=== Current squad ===
The following 30 players were named in the preliminary squad for the 2026 AFC U-20 Women's Asian Cup in April 2026.

No.	Pos.	Player	Date of birth (age)	Club
	GK	Lê Thị Thu	1 August 2007 (age 19)	(Vietnam Football Federation) Phong Phú Hà Nam
	GK	Lò Thị Huyền Trang		(Vietnam Football Federation) Phong Phú Hà Nam
	GK	Hoàng Hương Giang		(Vietnam Football Federation) Thái Nguyên T&T
	GK	Phạm Ngọc Anh		(Vietnam Football Federation) Hà Nội
	DF	Nguyễn Thị Thuỳ Linh	29 June 2006 (age 20)	(Vietnam Football Federation) Hồ Chí Minh City
	DF	Phạm Thị Như Ý	21 November 2006 (age 19)	(Vietnam Football Federation) Hồ Chí Minh City
	DF	Đào Khánh Vy		(Vietnam Football Federation) Hà Nội
	DF	Lô Thị Khánh Linh		(Vietnam Football Federation) Hà Nội
	DF	Vũ Thị Huyền		(Vietnam Football Federation) Hà Nội
	DF	Nguyễn Thị Thương		(Vietnam Football Federation) Hà Nội
	DF	Tạ Hồng Minh		(Vietnam Football Federation) Phong Phú Hà Nam
	DF	Lê Thị Như Quỳnh		(Vietnam Football Federation) Thái Nguyên T&T
	DF	Lục Thị Tuyết Lan		(Vietnam Football Federation) Thái Nguyên T&T
	DF	Dương Thị Bảo Trân		(Vietnam Football Federation) Thái Nguyên T&T
	MF	Lại Thị Trà Mi	24 May 2007 (age 19)	(Vietnam Football Federation) Hồ Chí Minh City
	MF	Nguyễn Thị Quý		(Vietnam Football Federation) Hà Nội
	MF	An Hoàng Cúc		(Vietnam Football Federation) Hà Nội
	MF	Nguyễn Thị Thùy Nhi	20 February 2006 (age 20)	(Vietnam Football Federation) Hà Nội
	MF	Y Za Lương		(Vietnam Football Federation) Phong Phú Hà Nam
	MF	Nguyễn Thị Hồng Huế		(Vietnam Football Federation) Phong Phú Hà Nam
	MF	Ngân Thị Thanh Hiếu	13 February 2007 (age 19)	(Vietnam Football Federation) Phong Phú Hà Nam
	MF	Lê Hồng Yêu	24 July 2007 (age 19)	(Vietnam Football Federation) Phong Phú Hà Nam
	MF	Đỗ Thị Thúy Nga		(Vietnam Football Federation) Thái Nguyên T&T
	MF	Nguyễn Thu Trang		(Vietnam Football Federation) Thái Nguyên T&T
	MF	Hà Phương Nga		(Vietnam Football Federation) Thái Nguyên T&T
	MF	Cà Thị Phương		(Vietnam Football Federation) Thái Nguyên T&T
	MF	Ngô Thảo Nguyên		(Vietnam Football Federation) Thái Nguyên T&T
	FW	Đậu Nguyễn Quỳnh Anh	1 January 2007 (age 19)	(Vietnam Football Federation) Hồ Chí Minh City
	FW	Lê Thị Trang	21 December 2007 (age 18)	(Vietnam Football Federation) Hà Nội
	FW	Lưu Hoàng Vân	9 April 2006 (age 20)	(Vietnam Football Federation) Phong Phú Hà Nam

=== Recent call-ups ===
The following players have also been called up to the squad within the last 12 months.

Pos.	Player	Date of birth (age)	Caps	Goals	Club	Latest call-up
^{INJ} Player withdrew from the squad due to an injury.^{PRE} Preliminary squad.^{OTH} Player withdrew from the squad due to other reasons.^{SUS} Serving suspension
