= 2023 AFF U-19 Women's Championship =

Tournament details
- Host country: Indonesia
- Dates: 5–15 July
- Teams: 10 (from 1 sub-confederation)
- Venues: 2 (in 1 host city)

Final positions
- Champions: Thailand (2nd title)
- Runners-up: Vietnam
- Third place: Myanmar
- Fourth place: Indonesia

Tournament statistics
- Matches played: 16
- Goals scored: 64 (4 per match)
- Top scorer(s): (Indonesia) Claudia Scheunemann (Vietnam) Ngọc Minh Chuyên (5 goals)
- Best player: (Indonesia) Claudia Scheunemann
- Best goalkeeper: (Vietnam) Danh Thị Kiều My

The 2023 AFF U-19 Women's Championship was the 3rd edition of the AFF U-19 Women's Championship, an international women's youth football tournament organised by ASEAN Football Federation (AFF). It was hosted by Indonesia and started on 5 July.

== Participant teams ==
There was no qualification, and all entrants advanced to the final tournament. The following teams from member associations of the AFF entered the tournament:

Team	Association	Appearance	Previous best performance
Cambodia	FF Cambodia	2nd	Group stage (2022)
Indonesia	FA Indonesia	2nd	Group stage (2022)
Laos	Lao FF	1st	Debut
Malaysia	FA Malaysia	2nd	Group stage (2022)
Myanmar	Myanmar FF	3rd	Third place (2014)
Philippines	Philippine FF	2nd	Group stage (2022)
Singapore	FA Singapore	3rd	Fourth place (2014)
Timor-Leste	FF Timor-Leste	2nd	Group Stage (2014)
Thailand	FA Thailand	3rd	Winners (2014)
Vietnam	Vietnam FF	3rd	Runner-up (2014, 2022)

Did not enter
Australia
Brunei

== Venues ==
Matches will be held in Jakabaring Sport City, with Gelora Sriwijaya Stadium as the main venue and Jakabaring Athletic Field as the alternate venue.

Palembang
Gelora Sriwijaya Stadium	Jakabaring Athletic Field
Capacity: 23,000	Capacity: 5,000
2023 AFF U-19 Women's Championship is located in Palembang

== Group stage ==
- All times listed are WIB (UTC+7).

=== Group A ===
Pos	Team	Pld	W	D	L	GF	GA	GD	Pts	Qualification
1	Indonesia (H)	3	3	0	0	16	1	+15	9	Knockout stage
2	Cambodia	3	2	0	1	3	6	−3	6	
3	Laos	3	1	0	2	7	6	+1	3	
4	Timor-Leste	3	0	0	3	0	13	−13	0	

Source: AFF
Rules for classification: 1) points; 2) head-to-head; 3) goal difference; 4) goals scored; 5) penalty shoot-out; 6) disciplinary points; 7) drawing of lots.
(H) Hosts
5 July 2023
15:30

Cambodia	2–1	Laos
Chhit 10', 53'	Report	Chinda 4'

Gelora Sriwijaya Stadium, Palembang
5 July 2023
19:30

Indonesia	7–0	Timor-Leste
Awi 10', 64'; Claudia 25'; Cecilia 35' (o.g.); Wandik 45'; Ayunda 66', 90'	Report

Gelora Sriwijaya Stadium, Palembang

7 July 2023
15:30

Timor-Leste	0–1	Cambodia
	Report	Somrit 85'

Gelora Sriwijaya Stadium, Palembang
7 July 2023
19:30

Laos	1–4	Indonesia
Chaikham 12'	Report	Sava 17'; Claudia 45+3', 68'; Ayunda 83'

Gelora Sriwijaya Stadium, Palembang

9 July 2023
19:30

Indonesia	5–0	Cambodia
Claudia 32'; Awi 48'; Ayunda 58'; Sheva 60', 90+4'	Report

Gelora Sriwijaya Stadium, Palembang
9 July 2023
19:30

Laos	5–0	Timor-Leste
Ling 11'; Sinlakhone 22'; Chaikham 31', 89'; Kemmy 66'	Report

Jakabaring Athletic Field, Palembang

=== Group B ===
Pos	Team	Pld	W	D	L	GF	GA	GD	Pts	Qualification
1	Vietnam	2	2	0	0	11	0	+11	6	Knockout stage
2	Malaysia	2	1	0	1	1	6	−5	3	
3	Singapore	2	0	0	2	0	6	−6	0	

Source: AFF
6 July 2023
15:30

Singapore	0–5	Vietnam
	Report	Lưu Hoàng Vân 7', 17'; Ngọc Minh Chuyên 14'; Hồ Thị Thanh Thảo 16'; Lê Thị Bảo Trâm 65' (pen.)

Jakabaring Athletic Field, Palembang
8 July 2023
15:30

Malaysia	1–0	Singapore
S. Thivashini 65'	Report

Jakabaring Athletic Field, Palembang
10 July 2023
15:30

Vietnam	6–0	Malaysia
Vũ Thị Hoa 21' (pen.); Ngọc Minh Chuyên 25', 53', 88'; Nguyễn Thùy Linh 67'; Hoàng Thị Ngọc Ánh 80'	Report

Jakabaring Athletic Field, Palembang

=== Group C ===
Pos	Team	Pld	W	D	L	GF	GA	GD	Pts	Qualification
1	Thailand	2	2	0	0	7	0	+7	6	Knockout stage
2	Myanmar	2	1	0	1	2	2	0	3	Knockout stage
3	Philippines	2	0	0	2	1	8	−7	0	

Source: AFF
6 July 2023
19:30

Philippines	0–6	Thailand
	Report	Kantisa 17'; Natcha 19'; Jeena 75' (pen.); Anaphon 82'; Thanchanok 83'; Rinyaphat 84' (pen.)

Jakabaring Athletic Field, Palembang
8 July 2023
19:30

Myanmar	2–1	Philippines
Zin Moe Pyae 58'; Yin Loon Eain 75'	Report	Alforque 40'

Jakabaring Athletic Field, Palembang
10 July 2023
19:30

Thailand	1–0	Myanmar
Pitchayathida 90'	Report

Jakabaring Athletic Field, Palembang

== Ranking of second-placed teams ==
Only one second-placed team will qualify for the semi-finals.

Result against fourth-placed team in Group A will be not considered for this ranking.

Pos	Grp	Team	Pld	W	D	L	GF	GA	GD	Pts	Qualification
1	C	Myanmar	2	1	0	1	2	2	0	3	Knockout stage
2	A	Cambodia	2	1	0	1	2	6	−4	3	
3	B	Malaysia	2	1	0	1	1	6	−5	3	

Source: AFF
Rules for classification: 1) points; 2) goal difference; 3) goals scored; 4) disciplinary points; 5) drawing of lots.

== Knockout stage ==
In the knockout stage, the penalty shoot-out is used to decide the winner if necessary.

On 10 July, the ASEAN Football Federation or AFF clarified about the draw of the semi-finals, resulting in the adjustment of the Indonesia national team to duel Thailand instead in the semi-finals. According to the conditions, if the best second placed team came from Group A or Group C, then the best second placed team would advance to the semi-finals to meet the winner of Group B, so the draw was adjusted as follows.

=== Bracket ===
Semi-finals
13 July – Palembang
Vietnam (a.e.t.)	2
Myanmar	1
13 July – Palembang
Indonesia	1
Thailand	7

Final
15 July – Palembang
Vietnam	1
Thailand	2
Third Place
15 July – Palembang
Myanmar (p)	1 (4)
Indonesia	1 (2)

=== Semi-finals ===
13 July 2023
15:30

Vietnam	2–1 (a.e.t.)	Myanmar
Ngọc Minh Chuyên 43'; Lê Thị Trang 104'	Report	Yin Loon Eain 8'

Gelora Sriwijaya Stadium, Palembang
13 July 2023
19:30

Indonesia	1–7	Thailand
Claudia 24'	Report	Thawanrat 15', 31', 70'; Anaphon 29', 47'; Chattaya 63'; Natcha 87'

Gelora Sriwijaya Stadium, Palembang

=== Third place match ===
15 July 2023
15:30

Myanmar	1–1	Indonesia
Yin Loon Eain 30'	Report	Awi 49' (pen.)
Penalties
Theingi Htwe (penalty scored); Sandar Lin (penalty scored); Phyu Phyu Win (penalty scored); Phyu Phwe (penalty scored)	4–2	(penalty missed) Helsya; (penalty scored) Claudia; (penalty scored) Awi; (penalty missed) Ellen

Gelora Sriwijaya Stadium, Palembang

=== Final ===
15 July 2023
19:30

Vietnam	1–2	Thailand
Lý Linh Trang 75'	Report	Supaporn 69'; Thanchanok 72'

Gelora Sriwijaya Stadium, Palembang

== Winner ==
2023 AFF U-19 Women's Championship winners

Thailand
2nd title

== Goalscorers ==
There were 64 goals scored in 16 matches, for an average of 4 goals per match.

5 goals

- (Indonesia) Claudia Scheunemann
- (Vietnam) Ngọc Minh Chuyên

4 goals

- (Indonesia) Ayunda Anggraini
- (Indonesia) Marsela Yuliana Awi

3 goals

- (Laos) Chaikham Xaiyapaserd
- (Myanmar) Yin Loon Eain
- (Thailand) Anaphon Amanpong
- (Thailand) Thawanrat Promthongmee

2 goals

- (Cambodia) Chhit Sapheourn
- (Indonesia) Sheva Imut
- (Thailand) Natcha Kaewanta
- (Thailand) Thanchanok Jansri
- (Vietnam) Lưu Hoàng Vân

1 goal

- (Cambodia) Somrit Nimol
- (Indonesia) Armelia Nur Sava Zada
- (Indonesia) Rana Wandik
- (Laos) Chinda Sihalath
- (Laos) Kemmy Oudomsok
- (Laos) Ling Manivanh
- (Laos) Sinlakhone Bounnaly
- (Malaysia) S. Thivashini
- (Myanmar) Zin Moe Pyae
- (Philippines) Maegan Alforque
- (Thailand) Chattaya Pratumkul
- (Thailand) Jeena Thongpan
- (Thailand) Kantisa Inchamnan
- (Thailand) Pitchayathida Manowang
- (Thailand) Rinyaphat Mondong
- (Thailand) Supaporn Inthaprasit
- (Vietnam) Hồ Thị Thanh Thảo
- (Vietnam) Hoàng Thị Ngọc Ánh
- (Vietnam) Lê Thị Bảo Trâm
- (Vietnam) Lê Thị Trang
- (Vietnam) Lý Linh Trang
- (Vietnam) Nguyễn Thùy Linh
- (Vietnam) Vũ Thị Hoa

1 own goal

- (Timor-Leste) Cecilia Dos Santos (against Indonesia)
