= Malaysia women's national under-20 football team =

National association football team

Malaysia U-20
- Nickname: Malayan Tigress U-20
- Association: Football Association of Malaysia
- Confederation: AFC (Asia)
- Sub-confederation: AFF (Southeast Asia)
- Head coach: Cameron NG
- Captain: Nur Dhiyaa Addin
- Home stadium: UiTM Stadium
- FIFA code: MAS
First colours	Second colours

AFC U-20 Women's Asian Cup
- Appearances: 2 (first in 2006)
- Best result: Group stage (2004), (2006)

AFF U-19 Women's Championship
- Appearances: 3 (first in 2022)
- Best result: Group stage (2022, (2023), (2025)

The Malaysia women's national under-20 football team represents Malaysia in international women's youth football. The team is controlled by the Football Association of Malaysia (FAM), the governing body for football in Malaysia. The team also serves as the women's national under-19 football team of Malaysia.

The team takes part in competitions such as the ASEAN U-19 Women's Championship, AFC U-20 Women's Asian Cup, and FIFA U-20 Women's World Cup, as well as any other under-20 international football tournaments.

== Competitive record ==
=== FIFA U-20 Women's World Cup ===
[[FIFA U-20 Women's World Cup|FIFA U-20 Women's World Cup Record]]
Year	Round	GP	W	D	L	GS	GA
(Canada) 2002	Did not enter						
(Thailand) 2004 to (Poland) 2026	Did not qualify						
Total	None	0	0	0	0	0	0

=== AFC U-20 Women's Asian Cup ===
[[AFC U-20 Women's Asian Cup|AFC U-20 Women's Asian Cup Record]]
Year	Round	GP	W	D	L	GS	GA
(India) 2002	Did not enter						
(China) 2004	Group Stage	2	0	0	2	0	41
(Malaysia) 2006	Group Stage	3	0	0	3	1	40
(China) 2007	did not qualify						
(China) 2009	did not qualify						
(Vietnam) 2011	did not qualify						
(China) 2013	did not qualify						
(China) 2015	did not qualify						
(China) 2017	did not qualify						
(Thailand) 2019	did not qualify						
(Uzbekistan) 2024	did not qualify						
(Thailand) 2026	did not qualify						
Total	Best: Group Stage	5	0	0	5	1	81

=== ASEAN U-19 Women's Championship ===
[[ASEAN U-19 Women's Championship|ASEAN U-19 Women's Championship Record]]
Year	Round	GP	W	D	L	GS	GA
(Indonesia) 2022	Group Stage	3	1	0	2	2	11
(Indonesia) 2023	Group Stage	2	1	0	1	1	6
(Vietnam) 2025	Group Stage	3	1	0	2	5	11
Total	Best: Group Stage	8	3	0	5	8	28

== Results and fixtures ==
Win Draw Lost Fixture

The following is a list of match results in the last 12 months, as well as any future matches that have been scheduled.

== Players ==
=== Current squad ===
The following players were called up for the 2026 AFC U-20 Women's Asian Cup qualification on 6–10 August in Kuala Lumpur, Malaysia.

No.	Pos.	Player	Date of birth (age)	Club
	GK	Nurdiana Syafiqah		(Football Association of Malaysia) Kelana United
	GK	Siti Zulaikha Bashah		(Football Association of Malaysia) Red Eagles
	GK	Nur Qistina Zulkafli		(Football Association of Malaysia) Kuala Lumpur FA
	DF	Chrisarellysa Richard		(Football Association of Malaysia) Sabah FA
	DF	Fleyvianniezie Ishak		(Football Association of Malaysia) Sabah FA
	DF	Harrienianeeka Indran		(Football Association of Malaysia) Sabah FA
	DF	Arecha Pansie Efandi		(Football Association of Malaysia) Sabah FA
	DF	Tegen Butler		(United States Soccer Federation) Rockford Raptors
	DF	Nur Dhiyaa Addin (captain)		(Football Association of Malaysia) MBSJ
	DF	Fatin Najiha		(Football Association of Malaysia) Kelana United
	DF	Nursyazalinah Jainudin		(Football Association of Malaysia) Sabah FA
	MF	Hallyviana Joseph		(Football Association of Malaysia) Sabah FA
	MF	Ku Nuwairah		(Football Association of Malaysia) Selangor
	MF	Nuratiqah Batrisyia		(Football Association of Malaysia) Selangor
	MF	Nur Marissa Aleya		(Football Association of Malaysia) Selangor
	MF	Nur Najwa Irdina		(Football Association of Malaysia) Selangor
	MF	Zafirah Zulaikha		(Football Association of Malaysia) SSS Leopard
	MF	Lauren Hoh Ruyi (vice-captain)		(United States Soccer Federation) Trinity Bantams
	FW	Kaseh Carlmila		(Football Association of Malaysia) UiTM United Lioness
	FW	S. Thivashini		(Football Association of Malaysia) MBPJ
	FW	Dian Aqilah		(Football Association of Malaysia) Selangor
	FW	Rocillyeka Lole		(Football Association of Malaysia) Sabah FA
	FW	Dishanna Pillay		(Canadian Soccer Association) Surrey United SC

== Coaches ==
Years	Names
2025–	(Malaysia) Cameron NG

== See also ==
- Malaysia women's national football team
