= AFC U-20 Women's Asian Cup =

- Organiser(s): AFC
- Founded: 2002; 24 years ago
- Region: Asia
- Teams: 12
- Current champions: Japan (7th title)
- Most championships: Japan (7 titles)
- 2026 AFC U-20 Women's Asian Cup

The AFC U-20 Women's Asian Cup is an association football tournament for women's national teams under the age of 20, organized by the Asian Football Confederation (AFC) every two years, and serves as a qualifying competition for the FIFA U-20 Women's World Cup. It was first played in 2002 as the AFC U-19 Women's Championship with an upper age limit of 19. Starting from the 2022 edition, the age limit was raised to 20. Moreover, the tournament was rebranded from the "AFC U-19 Women's Championship" to the "AFC U-20 Women's Asian Cup".

The current champion is Japan, which won the 2026 final 1–0 against North Korea. Japan is also the most successful team in the tournament, having won seven titles.

== Format ==
In 2002 and 2004 no qualifying round was played, with all teams directly participating in the group stage. Qualifying rounds were introduced starting from the 2006 edition, with eight teams qualifying to the final tournament. The eight teams were divided into two groups of four, with the top two teams qualifying to the semi-finals. In 2011 and 2013 the teams were reduced to six, which all played a single round-robin tournament. In 2015, the pre-2011 format was reinstated.

In 2026, the tournament was expanded from 8 to 12 teams.

== Results ==
Tournament names

- 2002–2019: AFC U-19 Women's Championship
- 2022–present: AFC U-20 Women's Asian Cup

Edition	Year	Hosts	Final			Third place match or losing semi-finalists (Note: No third place play-off has been played since 2026.)		
Edition	Year	Hosts	Champions	Score	Runners-up	Third place	Score	Fourth place
1	2002	India	Japan	2–1	Chinese Taipei	China	4–1	North Korea
2	2004	China	South Korea	3–0	China	North Korea	4–0	Thailand
3	2006	Malaysia	China	1–0	North Korea	Australia	3–2	Japan
4	2007	China	North Korea	1–0	Japan	China	1–0	South Korea
5	2009	China	Japan	2–1	South Korea	North Korea	1–0	China
6	2011	Vietnam	Japan	round-robin	North Korea	China	round-robin	South Korea
7	2013	China	South Korea	round-robin	North Korea	China	round-robin	Japan
8	2015	China	Japan	0–0 (a.e.t.) (4–2 p)	North Korea	South Korea	4–0	China
9	2017	China	Japan	1–0	North Korea	China	3–0	Australia
10	2019	Thailand	Japan	2–1	North Korea	South Korea	9–1	Australia
—	2022	Uzbekistan	Cancelled due to the COVID-19 pandemic					
11	2024	Uzbekistan	North Korea	2–1	Japan	Australia	1–0	South Korea
12	2026	Thailand	Japan	1–0	North Korea	China and South Korea		
13	2028	China						
14	2030	China						

== Teams reaching the top four ==
Nation	Champions	Runners-up	Third place	Fourth place
Japan	7 (2002, 2009, 2011, 2015, 2017, 2019, 2026)	2 (2007, 2024)	–	2 (2006, 2013)
North Korea	2 (2007, 2024)	7 (2006, 2011, 2013, 2015, 2017, 2019, 2026)	2 (2004, 2009)	1 (2002)
South Korea	2 (2004, 2013)	1 (2009)	2 (2015, 2019)	3 (2007, 2011, 2024)
China	1 (2006)	1 (2004)	5 (2002, 2007, 2011, 2013, 2017)	2 (2009, 2015)
Chinese Taipei	–	1 (2002)	–	–
Australia	–	–	2 (2006, 2024)	2 (2017, 2019)
Thailand	–	–	–	1 (2004)

== Overall team records ==
In this ranking 3 points are awarded for a win, 1 for a draw and 0 for a loss. As per statistical convention in football, matches decided in extra time are counted as wins and losses, while matches decided by penalty shoot-outs are counted as draws. Teams are ranked by total points, then by goal difference, then by goals scored.

As of 2024 AFC U-20 Women's Asian Cup.

Rank	Team	Part	M	W	D	L	GF	GA	GD	Points
1	North Korea	11	56	43	5	8	202	32	+170	134
2	Japan	11	53	37	9	7	189	31	+158	120
3	South Korea	11	50	29	4	17	158	54	+104	91
4	China	11	52	25	9	18	157	59	+98	84
5	Australia	9	39	17	1	21	77	80	–3	52
6	Chinese Taipei	7	24	6	1	17	31	73	−42	19
8	India	3	10	3	0	7	9	58	−49	9
9	Vietnam	6	20	3	0	17	30	84	−54	9
10	Myanmar	4	14	2	0	12	9	58	−49	6
11	Uzbekistan	5	15	1	1	13	7	77	−70	4
12	Philippines	1	3	1	0	2	4	8	−4	3
13	Jordan	1	3	1	0	2	2	17	−15	3
14	Singapore	2	6	1	0	5	2	42	−40	3
15	Hong Kong	2	6	1	0	5	4	45	−41	3
16	Nepal	1	3	0	0	3	2	29	−27	0
17	Iran	1	3	0	0	3	1	29	−28	0
18	Guam	2	6	0	0	3	0	54	−54	0
19	Malaysia	2	5	0	0	5	1	81	−80	0

== Comprehensive team results ==
Legend:

- 1st – Champions
- 2nd – Runners-up
- 3rd – Third place
- 4th – Fourth place
- SF – Semi-finals
- QF – Quarter-finals
- GS – Group stage
- • – Did not qualify
- × – Did not enter / Withdrew
- XX – Country did not exist or national team was inactive
- – Hosts
- q – Qualified for upcoming tournament

For each tournament, the flag of the host country and the number of teams in each finals tournament (in brackets) are shown.

Team	2002 (India) (12)	2004 (China) (15)	2006 (Malaysia) (8)	2007 (China) (8)	2009 (China) (8)	2011 (Vietnam) (6)	2013 (China) (6)	2015 (China) (8)	2017 (China) (8)	2019 (Thailand) (8)	2024 (Uzbekistan) (8)	2026 (Thailand) (12)	Total
Australia	OFC member		3rd	GS	GS	5th	5th	GS	4th	4th	3rd	QF	10
Bangladesh	×	×	•	×	×	•	•	×	×	•	•	GS	1
China	3rd	2nd	1st	3rd	4th	3rd	3rd	4th	3rd	GS	GS	SF	12
Chinese Taipei	2nd	QF	•	GS	GS	•	•	•	•	•	GS	GS	6
Guam	GS	GS	×	•	×	×	×	×	×	•	•	•	2
Hong Kong	GS	GS	•	•	×	×	•	•	•	•	•	•	2
India	GS	QF	GS	•	•	•	•	•	•	•	•	GS	4
Iran	×	×	×	×	•	•	•	GS	•	•	•	•	1
Japan	1st	QF	4th	2nd	1st	1st	4th	1st	1st	1st	2nd	1st	12
Jordan	×	×	GS	•	•	•	•	•	•	•	•	GS	2
Malaysia	×	GS	GS	×	×	×	×	×	×	•	•	•	2
Myanmar	GS	×	•	GS	•	•	6th	•	•	GS	•	•	4
Nepal	×	GS	•	•	•	•	•	•	•	•	•	•	1
North Korea	4th	3rd	2nd	1st	3rd	2nd	2nd	2nd	2nd	2nd	1st	2nd	12
Philippines	×	GS	×	×	•	•	•	×	×	×	•	×	1
Singapore	GS	GS	•	•	•	×	×	•	×	•	•	•	2
South Korea	GS	1st	GS	4th	2nd	4th	1st	3rd	GS	3rd	4th	SF	12
Thailand	GS	4th	•	GS	GS	•	•	GS	GS	GS	•	QF	8
Uzbekistan	GS	GS	•	×	×	•	•	GS	GS	•	GS	QF	6
Vietnam	×	QF	×	•	GS	6th	•	•	GS	GS	GS	QF	7

== FIFA U-20 Women's World Cup results ==
Legend

- 1st – Champions
- 2nd – Runners-up
- 3rd – Third place
- 4th – Fourth place
- QF – Quarter-finals
- R2 – Round 2 (since 2024: knockout round of 16)
- GS – Group stage
- – Hosts
- q – Qualified for upcoming tournament

For each tournament, the flag of the host country and the number of teams in each finals tournament (in brackets) are shown.

Team	2002 (Canada) (12)	2004 (Thailand) (12)	2006 (Russia) (16)	2008 (Chile) (16)	2010 (Germany) (16)	2012 (Japan) (16)	2014 (Canada) (16)	2016 (Papua New Guinea) (16)	2018 (France) (16)	2022 (Costa Rica) (16)	2024 (Colombia) (24)	2026 (Poland) (24)	Total
Australia (Note: Australia represented OFC before 2006.)	QF	QF	GS	•	•	•	•	•	•	GS	GS	•	5
China	•	2nd	2nd	GS	•	GS	GS	•	GS	•	•	R2	7
Chinese Taipei	GS	•	•	•	•	•	•	•	•	•	•	•	1
Japan	QF	•	•	QF	GS	3rd	•	3rd	1st	2nd	2nd	R2	9
North Korea	•	GS	•	•	QF	QF	QF	GS	•	GS	1st	q	8
South Korea	•	R1	•	•	3rd	QF	QF	GS	•	GS	R2	QF	7
Thailand	•	GS	•	•	•	•	•	•	•	•	•	•	1

== Awards ==
Tournament	Most Valuable Player	Top goalscorer(s)	Goals	Best goalkeeper	Fair play award
2006	(North Korea) Kim Song-hui	(China) Ma Xiaoxu	10	not awarded	Japan
2007	(North Korea) Ra Un-sim	(North Korea) Ra Un-sim	4	not awarded	Japan
2009	(Japan) Mana Iwabuchi	(Japan) Mana Iwabuchi (South Korea) Ji So-yun	4	not awarded	North Korea
2011	(Japan) Mai Kyokawa	(Japan) Mai Kyokawa (North Korea) Yun Hyon-hi	5	not awarded	Japan
2013	(South Korea) Jang Sel-gi	(South Korea) Jang Sel-gi	8	not awarded	China
2015	(Japan) Rikako Kobayashi	(North Korea) Ri Un-sim	6	not awarded	Japan
2017	(North Korea) Sung Hyang-sim	(North Korea) Sung Hyang-sim	6	not awarded	Japan
2019	(Japan) Oto Kanno	(South Korea) Kang Ji-woo	7	not awarded	Japan
2024	(North Korea) Chae Un-yong	(Japan) Maya Hijikata	4	(North Korea) Chae Un-gyong	Japan
2026	(Japan) Noa Fukushima	(North Korea) Pak Ok-i	7	(North Korea) Pak Ju-gyong	Japan

== See also ==
- AFC U-17 Women's Asian Cup
- AFC U-20 Asian Cup
- FIFA U-20 Women's World Cup
