= 2014 AFF U-19 Women's Championship =

Tournament details
- Host country: Thailand
- City: Bangkok
- Dates: 16–26 August
- Teams: 5 (from 1 confederation)
- Venue: 1 (in 1 host city)

Final positions
- Champions: Thailand (1st title)
- Runners-up: Vietnam
- Third place: Myanmar
- Fourth place: Singapore

Tournament statistics
- Matches played: 12
- Goals scored: 103 (8.58 per match)
- Top scorer: (Myanmar) Nilar Win (16 goals)

The 2014 AFF U-19 Women's Championship was held from 16 to 26 August 2014, hosted by Thailand. All games were played at the Rajamangala Stadium. For the first time it was held as an under-19 tournament.

Thailand beat Vietnam in the final after penalties.

== Teams ==
- Vietnam
- Thailand
- Myanmar
- Timor-Leste
- Singapore

== Venue ==
Bangkok, Thailand
Rajamangala Stadium
Capacity: 65,000
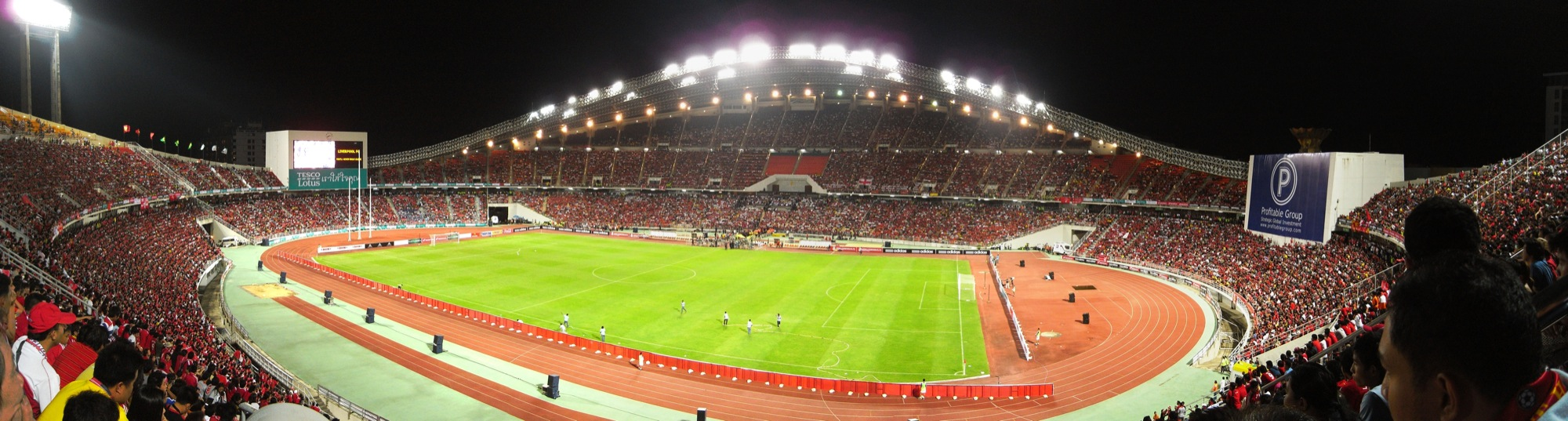

== Standings and Results ==
- All times are Thailand Standard Time – UTC+07:00.

Key to colours in group tables
Group winners and runners-up advance to the finals

=== Group stage ===
Team	Pld	W	D	L	GF	GA	GD	Pts
Thailand	4	4	0	0	36	1	+35	12
Vietnam	4	2	1	1	31	3	+28	7
Myanmar	4	2	1	1	27	4	+23	7
Singapore	4	1	0	3	4	34	−30	3
Timor-Leste	4	0	0	4	0	56	−56	0

16 August 2014
16:00

Thailand	3–0	Myanmar
Jiraporn Mongkoldee 20', 90+3'; Sirintip Thongmai 69'	Report

Rajamangala Stadium, Bangkok
Referee: Li Juan (China)
16 August 2014
19:00

Timor-Leste	0–4	Singapore
	Report	Nurul Khairiah Binte Azhar 1', 72'; Nur Faradila Binte Rafidi 6'; Sitianiwati Binte Rosielin 69'

Rajamangala Stadium, Bangkok
Referee: Cho Aung Seinn (Myanmar)

18 August 2014
16:00

Singapore	0–10	Vietnam
	Report	Nguyễn Thị Minh Anh 5'; Lê Hoài Lương 7', 13', 19', 24', 35', 37'; Nguyễn Kim Anh 28'; Bùi Thị Trang 57'; Lê Thị Thùy Trang 83'

Rajamangala Stadium, Bangkok
Referee: Rita Gani (Malaysia)
18 August 2014
19:00

Timor-Leste	0–17	Thailand
	Report	Sojirat Pradisorn 5'; Kullasatree Jaiton 10'; Passanan Thong-Im 19', 29', 32'; Jiraporn Mongkoldee 41', 51'; Saowalak Pengngam 45', 70', 78', 80', 89'; Sudarat 47', 90+3'; Panadda Siserm 49', 52'; Mutita Senkram 63'

Rajamangala Stadium, Bangkok
Referee: Cho Aung Seinn (Myanmar)

20 August 2014
16:00

Vietnam	19–0	Timor-Leste
Nguyễn Thị Thùy Hương 7', 24'; Lê Thị Thùy Trang 15', 21', 45', 57'; Lê Thị Hồng Tươi 25', 44', 80'; Hoàng Thị Mười 51', 86', 88', 90', 93'; Lê Hoài Lương 59', 66', 71', 76'; Nguyễn Kim Anh 85'	Report

Rajamangala Stadium, Bangkok
Referee: Cho Aung Seinn (Myanmar)
20 August 2014
19:00

Myanmar	10–0	Singapore
Nilar Win 9', 19', 72', 74', 81'; Kay Zin Myint 17', 40', 57'; Yun Me Me Lwin 45+1'; May Sabai Phoo 76'	Report

Rajamangala Stadium, Bangkok
Referee: Li Juan (China)

22 August 2014
16:00

Timor-Leste	0–16	Myanmar
	Report	Nilar Win 27', 30', 31', 34', 47', 52', 54', 56', 80', 84'; May Sabai Phoo 45+1'; Theint Ko Ko 50'; Kay Zin Myint 73', 90+1'; Wai Zin Hnin 79'

Rajamangala Stadium, Bangkok
Referee: Patchaya Boonprasit (Thailand)
22 August 2014
19:00

Thailand	2–1	Vietnam
Sudarat 12'; Sirintip Thongmai 51'	Report	Lê Hoài Lương 23'

Rajamangala Stadium, Bangkok
Referee: Rita Gani (Malaysia)

24 August 2014
16:00

Singapore	0–14	Thailand
	Report	Passanan Thong-Im 16', 25', 62', 71', 74'; Panadda Siserm 24'; Saowalak Pengngam 33', 70', 77', 90'; Sudarat 57', 68'; Oraya Sridarak 59'; Kanthika Choodet 64'

Rajamangala Stadium, Bangkok
Referee: Law Bik Chi (Hong Kong)
24 August 2014
19:00

Myanmar	1–1	Vietnam
Wai Zin Hnin 64'	Report	Khin Pyae Lin 44' (o.g.)

Rajamangala Stadium, Bangkok
Referee: Li Juan (China)

== Knockout stage ==
=== Third place play-off ===
26 August 2014
16:00

Myanmar	5–0	Singapore
Yun Me Me Lwin 4', 11'; May Sabai Phoo 45+1'; Yu Per Khine 57'; Theint Ko Ko 64'	Report

Rajamangala Stadium, Bangkok
Referee: Patchaya Boonprasit (Thailand)

=== Final ===
26 August 2014
19:00

Thailand	0–0 (a.e.t.)	Vietnam
	Report
Penalties
Wanwisa Tuket (penalty scored); Sudarat (penalty scored); Methawi Upapong (penalty scored); Jiraporn Mongkoldee (penalty scored); Sojirat Pradisorn (penalty scored)	5–3	(penalty scored) Lê Hoài Lương; (penalty scored) Biện Thị Hằng; (penalty scored) Nguyễn Thị Thùy Hương; (penalty missed) Trần Thị Kim Anh

Rajamangala Stadium, Bangkok
Referee: Rita Gani (Malaysia)

== Winner ==
2014 AFF U-19 Women's Championship Winners
(Thailand)
Thailand
First title

== Goalscorers ==
16 goals

- (Myanmar) Nilar Win

11 goals

- (Vietnam) Lê Hoài Lương

9 goals

- (Thailand) Saowalak Pengngam

8 goals

- (Thailand) Passanan Thong-Im

5 goals

- (Myanmar) Kay Zin Myint
- (Thailand) Sudarat Chuchuen
- (Vietnam) Lê Thị Thùy Trang
- (Vietnam) Hoàng Thị Mười

4 goals

- (Thailand) Jiraporn Mongkoldee

3 goals

- (Myanmar) May Sabai Phoo
- (Myanmar) Yun Me Me Lwin
- (Thailand) Panadda Siserm
- (Vietnam) Lê Thị Hồng Tươi

2 goals

- (Myanmar) Wai Zin Hnin
- (Myanmar) Theint Ko Ko
- (Thailand) Sirintip Thongmai
- (Singapore) Nurul Khairiah Binte Azhar
- (Vietnam) Nguyễn Kim Anh
- (Vietnam) Nguyễn Thị Thùy Hương

1 goal

- (Myanmar) Yu Per Khine
- (Singapore) Nur Faradila Binte Rafidi
- (Singapore) Sitianiwati Binte Rosielin
- (Thailand) Sojirat Pradisorn
- (Thailand) Kullasatree Jaiton
- (Thailand) Kanthika Choodet
- (Thailand) Oraya Sridarak
- (Thailand) Mutita Senkram
- (Vietnam) Nguyễn Thị Minh Anh
- (Vietnam) Bùi Thị Trang

Own goal

- (Myanmar) Khin Pyae Lin (playing against Vietnam)
