= Yu Yu Naing =

Burmese footballer (born 2007)

Personal information
- Date of birth: 29 November 2007 (age 18)
- Place of birth: Yangon, Myanmar
- Position: Defender

Team information
- Current team: Yangon United
- Number: 16

Senior career*
Years	Team	Apps	(Gls)
2023–	Yangon United		

International career^{‡}
2023	Myanmar U17	0	(0)
2023–	Myanmar U19	6	(0)
2025–	Myanmar	2	(0)
- * Club domestic league appearances and goals as of 6 February 2026 ‡ National team caps and goals as of 1 December 2025

Yu Yu Naing (Burmese: ယုယုနိုင်; born 29 November 2007) is a Burmese professional footballer who plays as a defender for Myanmar Women League club Yangon United and the Myanmar women's national football team.

== Club career ==
Yu Yu Naing began her professional career with Yangon United in 2023. She established herself as a regular defender for Yangon United, wearing the number 16 jersey.

== International career ==
In 2023, Yu Yu Naing represented the Myanmar U17 and Myanmar U19 team. She was later called up to the senior national team in 2025.
