= ASEAN U-19 Women's Championship =

- Organiser(s): AFF
- Founded: 2014; 12 years ago
- Region: Southeast Asia
- Teams: 8
- Current champions: Thailand
- Most championships: Thailand (3 titles)

The ASEAN U-19 Women's Championship is association football tournament for women's national teams under the age of 19. It is organised by the ASEAN Football Federation every two years. The official tournament started in 2014, hosted by Thailand and won by Thailand.

== History ==
=== 2014 ===
The first women's ASEAN championship at the youth level, held as the 2014 AFF U-19 Women's Championship was held in Thailand from 16 August through 26 August 2014. The competition was held at the Rajamangala Stadium.

In the final, Thailand defeated Vietnam by penalties. The top scorer award went to Nilar Win of Myanmar.

=== 2022 ===
Eight years after the maiden tournament, ASEAN Football Federation decided to bring back the competition and changed it into an under-18 tournament. Indonesia were chosen as host for the 2022 edition. All matches were held in Jakabaring Sport City, with Gelora Sriwijaya Stadium as the main venue and Jakabaring Athletic Field as the alternate venue.

== Results ==
Year	Hosts	Final			Third Place Match
Year	Hosts	Champion	Score	Runner-up	Third Place	Score	Fourth Place
2014; Details	Thailand	Thailand	0–0 (a.e.t.) (5–3 p)	Vietnam	Myanmar	5–0	Singapore
2022; Details	Indonesia	Australia	2–0	Vietnam	Thailand	2–0	Myanmar
2023; Details	Indonesia	Thailand	2–1	Vietnam	Myanmar	1–1 (a.e.t.) (4–2 p)	Indonesia
2025; Details	Vietnam	Thailand	3–1	Vietnam	Indonesia	0–0 (a.e.t.) (6–5 p)	Myanmar
2027; Details	Myanmar

== Awards ==
Tournament	Top scorer(s)	Goals	Best player	Best goalkeeper
2014	(Myanmar) Nilar Win	16		
2022	(Vietnam) Ngọc Minh Chuyên	6	(Australia) Shay Hollman	(Thailand) Pawarisa Homyamyen
2023	(Indonesia) Claudia Scheunemann (Vietnam) Ngọc Minh Chuyên	5	(Indonesia) Claudia Scheunemann	(Vietnam) Danh Thị Kiều My
2025	(Thailand) Kurisara Limpawanich	6	(Thailand) Kurisara Limpawanich	(Thailand) Athima Boonprakanpai

=== Winning coaches ===
Year	Team	Coach
2014	Thailand	(Thailand) Nuengrutai Srathongvian
2022	Australia	(Australia) Rae Dower
2023	Thailand	(Thailand) Sawin Jaraspetcharanan
2025	Thailand	(Thailand) Nuengrutai Srathongvian

== Records and statistics ==
=== Total wins ===
Team	Champions	Runners-up	Third Place	Fourth Place
Thailand	3 (2014, 2023, 2025)	–	1 (2022)	–
Australia / U17	1 (2022)	–	–	–
Vietnam	–	4 (2014, 2022, 2023, 2025)	–	–
Myanmar	–	–	2 (2014, 2023)	2 (2022, 2025)
Indonesia	–	–	1 (2025)	1 (2023)
Singapore	–	–	–	1 (2014)

== Participating nations ==
Legend

- 1st — Champions
- 2nd — Runners-up
- 3rd — Third place
- 4th — Fourth place
- GS — Group stage
- q — Qualified for the current tournament
- × — Did not enter / Withdrew / Banned
- — Hosts

Team	2014 (Thailand)	2022 (Indonesia)	2023 (Indonesia)	2025 (Vietnam)	Total
Australia	×	1st	×	×	1
Cambodia	×	GS	GS	GS	3
Indonesia	×	GS	4th	3rd	3
Laos	×	×	GS	GS	2
Malaysia	×	GS	GS	GS	3
Myanmar	3rd	4th	3rd	4th	4
Philippines	×	GS	GS	×	2
Singapore	4th	GS	GS	×	3
Thailand	1st	3rd	1st	1st	4
Timor-Leste	GS	×	GS	GS	3
Vietnam	2nd	2nd	2nd	2nd	4

== General statistics ==
As per statistical convention in football, matches decided in extra time are counted as wins and losses, while matches decided by penalty shoot-outs are counted as draws. 3 points per win, 1 point per draw and 0 points per loss.

As end of 2025 ASEAN U-19 Women's Championship

Rank	Team	Part	Pld	W	D	L	GF	GA	Dif	Pts
1	Thailand	4	20	17	1	2	92	9	+83	52
2	Vietnam	4	20	14	2	4	89	13	+76	44
3	Myanmar	4	19	8	3	8	57	25	+32	27
4	Indonesia	3	14	6	3	5	27	25	+2	21
5	Australia	1	5	5	0	0	17	1	+16	15
6	Malaysia	3	8	3	0	5	8	28	−20	9
7	Cambodia	3	10	2	2	6	5	28	−23	8
8	Laos	2	6	2	0	4	9	20	−11	6
9	Singapore	3	11	1	1	9	5	62	−57	4
10	Philippines	2	5	0	0	5	3	17	−14	0
11	Timor-Leste	3	10	0	0	10	0	84	−84	0

== See also ==
- AFF Women's Championship
- AFF U-16 Women's Championship
