= Daisy Aung =

Burmese footballer

Personal information
- Full name: Daisy Aung
- Date of birth: 9 June 2006 (age 20)
- Place of birth: Naypyidaw, Myanmar
- Height: 1.57 m (5 ft 2 in)
- Position: Midfielder

Team information
- Current team: Yangon United
- Number: 18

Senior career*
Years	Team	Apps	(Gls)
2022	YREO		
2023-	Yangon United		

International career^{‡}
2023–	Myanmar U19	7	(2)
2026–	Myanmar	1	(0)
- * Club domestic league appearances and goals as of 19 September 2026 ‡ National team caps and goals as of 19 September 2026

Daisy Aung (Burmese: ဒေစီအောင်; born 9 June 2006) is a Burmese professional footballer who plays as a Central midfielder for Yangon United and the Myanmar women's national football team.

== Career ==
=== Club ===
Daisy Aung played for YERO and transferred to Yangon United in 2023.

=== National Team ===
Daisy Aung was selected for the Myanmar women's national team for the Asian Games, making her debut against North Korea.

Appearances and goals by national team and year
National team	Year	Apps	Goals
Myanmar	2026-	1	0
Myanmar	Total	1	0

=== Club ===
Club	Season	League			Continental		Total	
Club	Season	Division	Apps	Goals	Apps	Goals	Apps	Goals
Yangon United	2023-	Myanmar Women League	0	0	0	0	0	0
Career total			0	0	0	0	0	0

== First debut match for National Team ==
No.	Date	Venue	Opponent	Result	Competition
1.	17 September 2026	Osaka, Japan	North Korea	8-0	2026 Asian Games

== External Link ==
Interview

== See also ==
- Yangon United women
- Yangon United
