= Kurisara Limpawanich =

Thai footballer (born 2009)

- Kurisara (Left) with BGC-College of Asian Scholars in 2026

Personal information
- Full name: Kurisara Limpawanich
- Date of birth: 5 February 2009 (age 17)
- Place of birth: Krachan, U Thong, Suphanburi, Thailand
- Position: Forward

Team information
- Current team: College of Asian Scholars
- Number: 13

Senior career*
Years	Team	Apps	(Gls)
- College of Asian Scholars

International career
2024–2026	Thailand U-17	6	(1)
2025–	Thailand U-19		
2026–	Thailand U-20		
2025–	Thailand		
- * Club domestic league appearances and goals

Kurisara Limpawanich (Thai: กุลิสรา ลิ้มปวะนิช; born 5 February 2009), or nicknamed as Kate, but known for her online name Messi Kate is a Thai footballer who plays as a Forward for BGC–College of Asian Scholars and the Thailand women's national team.

== Early life ==
Kurisara Limpawanich was born on 5 February 2009 in Krachan Subdistrict, U Thong, Suphan Buri. She is the daughter of Rangsan Limpawanich, Thai coach and former handball player. She was then raised in Tha Maka, Kanchanaburi. She attended Joseph Upatham School, during her primary years and later studied at U Thong High School in Suphan Buri.

At the age of nine, Kurisara featured in Super 10 as "Nong Kate". During the interview, she asked the judges to give the footballs to the poor kids in the temple because she wants them to have a chance to play football. Her wish then was granted by Viwat Wongphattarathiti.

== Club career ==
=== College of Asian Scholars ===
Kurisara competed for BGC–College of Asian Scholars in 2024–25 AFC Women's Champions League. In 2025, Kulisara represented the Thailand women's national football team. She participated with the Thailand women's national under-20 football team as they prepared for international tournaments, alongside her club career with BGC Bundit Asia. In the ASEAN U-19 Women's Championship, her team won first place with a score of three to one with Vietnam. In that event, she also won as the best player and the top scorer.

=== European trial ===
In July 2026, Kurisara travelled to Germany to train and trial with TSG 1899 Hoffenheim with both the Senior team and U20 team.
