= Timor-Leste women's national under-20 football team =

National association football team

Timor Leste women's U-20
- Association: FFTL
- Confederation: AFC
- Head coach: Unknown
- Captain: Unknown
- FIFA code: TLS
First colours	Second colours

First international
- Timor-Leste 0–4 Singapore (Bangkok, Thailand; 16 August 2014)

Biggest win
- None

Biggest defeat
- Vietnam 19–0 Timor-Leste (Bangkok, Thailand; 20 August 2014)

AFF U-19 Women's Championship
- Appearances: 2 (first in 2014)
- Best result: Group Stage (2014, 2023)

The Timor-Leste women's national under-20 football team, represents Timor-Leste is a national women's association football youth team of Timor Leste and is controlled by the Federação de Futebol de Timor-Leste (FFTL).

== Tournament Record ==
=== AFF U-19 Women's Championship record ===
AFF U-19 Women's Championship
Year	Result	Pld	W	D	L	GF	GA
(Thailand) 2014	Fifth place	4	0	0	4	0	56
(Indonesia) 2022	Did not enter						
(Indonesia) 2023	Group Stage	3	0	0	3	0	13
Total	2/3	7	0	0	7	0	69

== Results ==
International Matches in last 12 months, and future scheduled matches

Win Draw Loss
