= 2022 AFF U-18 Women's Championship =

Tournament details
- Host country: Indonesia
- Dates: 22 July – 4 August
- Teams: 9 (from 1 sub-confederation)
- Venue: 2 (in 1 host city)

Final positions
- Champions: Australia (1st title)
- Runners-up: Vietnam
- Third place: Thailand
- Fourth place: Myanmar

Tournament statistics
- Matches played: 18
- Goals scored: 67 (3.72 per match)
- Top scorer: (Vietnam) Ngọc Minh Chuyên (6 goals)
- Best player: (Australia) Shay Hollman
- Best goalkeeper: (Thailand) Pawarisa Homyamyen

The 2022 AFF U-18 Women's Championship was the 2nd edition of the AFF U-19 Women's Championship, an international women's youth football tournament organised by ASEAN Football Federation (AFF). It was hosted by Indonesia.

Australia beat Vietnam 2–0 in the final for their first title in the championship.

== Participating teams ==
There was no qualification and all entrants advanced to the final tournament. The following teams from member associations of the AFF entered the tournament:

Team	Association	Appearance	Previous best performance
Australia	FA Australia	1st	Debut
Cambodia	FF Cambodia	1st	Debut
Indonesia	FA Indonesia	1st	Debut
Malaysia	FA Malaysia	1st	Debut
Myanmar	Myanmar FF	2nd	Third place (2014)
Philippines	Philippine FF	1st	Debut
Singapore	FA Singapore	2nd	Fourth place (2014)
Thailand	FA Thailand	2nd	Winners (2014)
Vietnam	Vietnam FF	2nd	Runner-up (2014)

== Venues ==
Matches were held in Jakabaring Sport City, with Gelora Sriwijaya Stadium as the main venue and Jakabaring Athletic Field as the alternate venue.

Palembang
Gelora Sriwijaya Stadium	Jakabaring Athletic Field
Capacity: 23,000	Capacity: 5,000
2022 AFF U-18 Women's Championship is located in Palembang

== Group stage ==
- All times listed are WIB (UTC+7).

=== Group A ===
Pos	Team	Pld	W	D	L	GF	GA	GD	Pts	Qualification
1	Vietnam	4	4	0	0	19	1	+18	12	Knockout stage
2	Thailand	4	3	0	1	13	1	+12	9	Knockout stage
3	Indonesia (H)	4	2	0	2	3	5	−2	6	
4	Cambodia	4	0	1	3	1	13	−12	1	
5	Singapore	4	0	1	3	1	17	−16	1	

Source: AFF
Rules for classification: Group stage tiebreakers
(H) Hosts
22 July 2022
15:30

Cambodia	0–4	Thailand
	Report	Aimee 4'; Jeena 11', 43'; Praewa 18'

Gelora Sriwijaya Stadium, Palembang
Attendance: 86
Referee: Lê Thị Lý (Vietnam)
22 July 2022
19:30

Indonesia	1–0	Singapore
Scheunemann 30'	Report

Gelora Sriwijaya Stadium, Palembang
Referee: Sunita Thongthawin (Thailand)

24 July 2022
15:30

Vietnam	9–0	Singapore
Ngọc Minh Chuyên 8', 20'; Lưu Hoàng Vân 12', 41', 52', 90'; Đặng Thị Duyên 23', 33'; Hồ Thị Thanh Thảo 43'	Report

Gelora Sriwijaya Stadium, Palembang
Attendance: 50
Referee: Jhesa Mae Kaatz (Philippines)
24 July 2022
19:30

Indonesia	1–0	Cambodia
Sheva 90+2'	Report

Gelora Sriwijaya Stadium, Palembang
Attendance: 200
Referee: Bùi Thị Thu Trang (Vietnam)

26 July 2022
15:30

Thailand	6–0	Singapore
Thawanrat 45' (pen.); Aimee 53'; Jeena 78'; Supansa 84'; Thanchanok J. 86'	Report

Gelora Sriwijaya Stadium, Palembang
Referee: Khwa Nyo Thin (Myanmar)
26 July 2022
19:30

Vietnam	2–1	Indonesia
Ngọc Minh Chuyên 45+3'; Nguyễn Thị Như Quỳnh 73'	Report	Marsela 38'

Gelora Sriwijaya Stadium, Palembang
Attendance: 300
Referee: Supiree Testomya (Thailand)

28 July 2022
15:30

Cambodia	0–7	Vietnam
	Report	Hồng Như Hoa 5'; Ngọc Minh Chuyên 6', 45'; Nguyễn Thị Hải Yến 9'; Nguyễn Phương Anh 30', 58'; Hoàng Thị Ngọc Ánh 47'

Gelora Sriwijaya Stadium, Palembang
Attendance: 50
Referee: Jhesa Mae Kaatz (Philippines)
28 July 2022
19:30

Thailand	3–0	Indonesia
Supansa 3', 26'; Pichayatida 53'	Report

Gelora Sriwijaya Stadium, Palembang
Attendance: 2,000
Referee: Bùi Thị Thu Trang (Vietnam)

30 July 2022
15:30

Singapore	1–1	Cambodia
Zaherra 79'	Report	Sreynou 53'

Jakabaring Athletic Field, Palembang
Referee: Supiree Testomya (Thailand)
30 July 2022
15:30

Vietnam	1–0	Thailand
Nguyễn Thị Như Quỳnh 49'	Report

Gelora Sriwijaya Stadium, Palembang
Attendance: 50
Referee: Khwa Nyo Thin (Myanmar)

=== Group B ===
Pos	Team	Pld	W	D	L	GF	GA	GD	Pts	Qualification
1	Australia	3	3	0	0	14	1	+13	9	Knockout stage
2	Myanmar	3	2	0	1	6	3	+3	6	Knockout stage
3	Malaysia	3	1	0	2	2	11	−9	3	
4	Philippines	3	0	0	3	2	9	−7	0	

Source: AFF
Rules for classification: Group stage tiebreakers
25 July 2022
15:30

Australia	4–0	Philippines
Prakash 26', 62'; Beier 59'; Lobo 69'	Report

Jakabaring Athletic Field, Palembang
Attendance: 50
Referee: Keomany Phengmeuangkhon (Laos)
25 July 2022
19:30

Myanmar	2–0	Malaysia
Su Myat Noe 60'; May Thet Mon Myint 82'	Report

Jakabaring Athletic Field, Palembang
Attendance: 50
Referee: Plong Pichakara (Cambodia)

27 July 2022
15:30

Philippines	1–3	Myanmar
Lucban 87'	Report	Hnin Pwint Aye 33', 90+4'; Su Myat Noe 37'

Jakabaring Athletic Field, Palembang
Attendance: 50
Referee: Lê Thị Lý (Vietnam)
27 July 2022
19:30

Malaysia	0–8	Australia
	Report	Fisher 18'; O'Grady 37', 44'; Accardo 45'; Brown 77', 90'; Saveska 89'; Massih 90+2'

Jakabaring Athletic Field, Palembang
Attendance: 100
Referee: Sunita Thongthawin (Thailand)

29 July 2022
15:30

Australia	2–1	Myanmar
Brown 3'; O'Grady 65'	Report	Zin Moe Pyae 23'

Jakabaring Athletic Field, Palembang
Attendance: 50
Referee: Keomany Phengmeuangkhon (Laos)
29 July 2022
15:30

Malaysia	2–1	Philippines
Najwa 4', 8'	Report	Flanigan 53'

Gelora Sriwijaya Stadium, Palembang
Referee: Plong Pichakara (Cambodia)

== Knockout stage ==
In the knockout stage, the penalty shoot-out was used to decide the winner if necessary.

=== Bracket ===
Semi-finals
2 August 2022 - Palembang
Vietnam	4
Myanmar	1
2 August 2022 - Palembang
Australia (a.e.t.)	1
Thailand	0

Final
4 August 2022 - Palembang
Vietnam	0
Australia	2
Third place match
4 August 2022 - Palembang
Myanmar	0
Thailand	2

=== Semi-finals ===
2 August 2022
15:30

Vietnam	4–1	Myanmar
Đỗ Thị Ánh Mỹ 27'; Ngọc Minh Chuyên 58'; Trần Nhật Lan 64'; Lưu Hoàng Vân 90+1'	Report	Wai Phoo Eain 80'

Gelora Sriwijaya Stadium, Palembang
Attendance: 50
Referee: Supiree Testomya (Thailand)
2 August 2022
20:00

Australia	1–0 (a.e.t.)	Thailand
O'Grady 109'	Report

Gelora Sriwijaya Stadium, Palembang
Attendance: 100
Referee: Keomany Phengmeuangkhoun (Laos)

=== Third place match ===
4 August 2022
15:30

Myanmar	0–2	Thailand
	Report	Pichayatida 20'; Jeena 90+1'

Gelora Sriwijaya Stadium, Palembang
Attendance: 50
Referee: Lê Thị Lý (Vietnam)

=== Final ===
4 August 2022
20:00

Vietnam	0–2	Australia
	Report	Saveska 39'; Stanic-Floody 52'

Gelora Sriwijaya Stadium, Palembang
Attendance: 200
Referee: Supiree Testomya (Thailand)

== Winner ==
2022 AFF U-18 Women's Championship winners

Australia
First title

== Goalscorers ==
There were 71 goals scored in 20 matches, for an average of 3.55 goals per match.

6 goals

- (Vietnam) Ngọc Minh Chuyên

5 goals

- (Vietnam) Lưu Hoàng Vân

4 goals

- (Australia) Ella O'Grady

3 goals

- (Thailand) Jeena Thongpan
- (Thailand) Supansa Trisutho
- (Australia) Daisy Brown

2 goals

- (Australia) Avaani Prakash
- (Australia) Sienna Saveska
- (Vietnam) Đặng Thị Duyên
- (Vietnam) Nguyễn Phương Anh
- (Vietnam) Nguyễn Thị Như Quỳnh
- (Thailand) Aimee Kahapan
- (Thailand) Pichayatida Manowong
- (Myanmar) Su Myat Noe
- (Myanmar) Hnin Myint Aye
- (Malaysia) Najwa Irdina

1 goal

- (Cambodia) Vorn Sreynou
- (Indonesia) Claudia Scheunemann
- (Indonesia) Sheva Imut
- (Indonesia) Marsela Yuliana
- (Myanmar) May Thet Mon Myint
- (Myanmar) Wai Phoo Eain
- (Myanmar) Zin Moe Pyae
- (Vietnam) Hồ Thị Thanh Thảo
- (Vietnam) Hồng Như Hoa
- (Vietnam) Nguyễn Thị Hải Yến
- (Vietnam) Hoàng Thị Ngọc Anh
- (Vietnam) Nguyễn Thị Như Quỳnh
- (Vietnam) Đỗ Thị Ánh Mỹ
- (Vietnam) Trần Nhật Lan
- (Thailand) Thanchanok Jansri
- (Thailand) Praewa Nutnabee
- (Thailand) Thawanrat Promthongmee
- (Philippines) Jonalyn Lucban
- (Philippines) Isabella Flanigan
- (Singapore) Nur Zaherra Maisarah
- (Australia) Jonti Fisher
- (Australia) Isabella Accardo
- (Australia) Ella Massih
- (Australia) India Beier
- (Australia) Maya Lobo
- (Australia) Mary Stanic-Floody

== Final ranking ==
This table will show the ranking of teams throughout the tournament.

Pos	Team	Pld	W	D	L	GF	GA	GD	Pts	Final result
1	Australia	5	5	0	0	17	1	+16	15	Champions
2	Vietnam	6	5	0	1	23	4	+19	15	Runners-up
3	Thailand	6	4	0	2	15	2	+13	12	Third place
4	Myanmar	5	2	0	3	7	9	−2	6	Fourth place
5	Indonesia (H)	4	2	0	2	3	5	−2	6	Eliminated in group stage
6	Malaysia	3	1	0	2	2	11	−9	3	Eliminated in group stage
7	Cambodia	4	0	1	3	1	13	−12	1	Eliminated in group stage
8	Singapore	4	0	1	3	1	17	−16	1	Eliminated in group stage
9	Philippines	3	0	0	3	2	9	−7	0	Eliminated in group stage

Source: Group stage, Knockout stage
(H) Hosts
