= Myanmar women's national under-20 football team =

National association football team

Myanmar women's U-20
- Association: Myanmar Football Federation
- Confederation: AFC (Asia)
- FIFA code: MYA
First colours	Second colours

AFC U-20 Women's Asian Cup
- Appearances: 4 (first in 2002)
- Best result: Group Stage (2002, 2007, 2013, 2019)

AFF U-19 Women's Championship
- Appearances: 3 (first in 2014)
- Best result: Third place (2014, 2023)

The Myanmar women's national under-20 team is a national association football youth team of Myanmar and is controlled by the Myanmar Football Federation.

== Competitive record ==
=== AFC U-19 Women's Championship record ===
AFC U-20 Women's Asian Cup
Year	Round	GP	W	D	L	GF	GA
(India) 2002	Group stage	3	2	0	1	7	8
(China) 2004	Did not qualify						
(Malaysia) 2006	Did not qualify						
(China) 2007	Group stage	3	0	0	3	1	13
(China) 2009	Did not qualify						
(Vietnam) 2011	Did not qualify						
(China) 2013	Group stage	5	0	0	5	0	26
(China) 2015	Did not qualify						
(China) 2017	Did not qualify						
(Thailand) 2019	Group stage	3	0	0	3	1	11
(Uzbekistan) 2022	Cancelled due to COVID-19 pandemic						
(Uzbekistan) 2024	Did not qualify						
(Thailand) 2026	Did not qualify						
Total	Group stage	14	2	0	12	9	58

=== AFF U-19 Women's Championship record ===
AFF U-19 Women's Championship
Year	Round	Position	GP	W	D	L	GF	GA
(Thailand) 2014	Third place	3rd	4	2	1	1	27	4
(Indonesia) 2022	Fourth place	4th	5	2	0	3	7	9
(Indonesia) 2023	Third place	4th	4	1	1	2	4	5
Total	Third place	3/3	13	5	2	6	38	18

== Honours ==
=== AFF Competitions ===
- AFF U19 Women's Championship
  - Third Place (2): 2014, 2023

=== Invitation ===
- Jenesys Japan-Asean U19 Women's Football Tournament
  - Runners-up (1): 2019 Jenesys Japan-Asean U19 Women's Football Tournament

== Results ==
International Matches in last 12 months, and future scheduled matches

Win Draw Loss
