= Football at the 2011 Summer Universiade =

Football at the XXVI Summer Universiade
- Venue: various
- Dates: August 11, 2011 – August 22, 2011
- Teams: 16 (men); 12 (women)

Football at the 2011 Summer Universiade will be held at six venues in Shenzhen, China from 11 August to 22 August.

== Venues ==
Shenzhen
New Shenzhen Stadium	Xixiang Sports Center	Shenzhen Sports School
Capacity: 60,334	Capacity: 3,000	Capacity: 1,000
Shenzhen
Shenzhen University Town	Bao'an Stadium	Gumi Civic Stadium
Capacity: 1,000	Capacity: 40,000	Capacity: 1,000

== Medal summary ==
=== Medal table ===
Rank	Nation	Gold	Silver	Bronze	Total
1	Japan (JPN)	1	1	0	2
2	China (CHN)	1	0	0	1
3	Great Britain (GBR)	0	1	0	1
4	Brazil (BRA)	0	0	2	2
Totals (4 entries)		2	2	2	6

=== Events ===
Event	Gold	Silver	Bronze
Men	Japan (JPN); Takuya Masuda; Nagisa Sakurauchi; Kazuki Oiwa; Makoto Rindo; Yusuke Higa; Takahiro Nakazato; Kohei Hattanda; Kazuya Yamamura; Takamitsu Tomiyama; Yosuke Kawai; Yuji Senuma; Shun Takagi; Masaki Miyasaka; Yuichi Maruyama; Mitsunari Musaka; Akito Kawamoto; Yosuke Yuzawa; Shogo Taniguchi; Nobuyuki Shiina; Shuhei Akasaki	Great Britain (GBR); Danny Alcock; Graeme Law; Jonathan Else; Scott Cranston McCubbin; Ryan John Batley; Gary Warren; Craig Peter Moses; Kieran Thomas Murphy; Benjamin William Pugh; Mark Thomas Anderson; Jack Oliver Winter; Danny Sleath; Nicholas Dean Jupp; Kyle Macaulay; Andrew John Cook; Dominic Langdon; Gavin Malin; James William Craigen; Hector George Mackie; Thomas Richard Thorley	Brazil (BRA); Carlos Nunes; João Jordão Júnior; Fernando Cunha; Ítalo Silva; Marcelo Silva; Luiz Ciriaco; Ronaldo Silva; Thiago Florencio; Anderson Silva; André Santos; João Sales Júnior; Caio Melo; Janderson Silva; Liniker Aniceto; Dennys Amorim; Eduardo Carvalho; Luiz Paixão; Ramon Cruz; Jefersom Berger
Women	China (CHN); Zhao Lili; Xu Yanfen; Guo Tianyi; Wang Dongni; Fan Tingting; Bi Yan; Wang Chen; Li Wen; Wang Shanshan; Wang Lingling; Zhao Rong; Song Xiangjie; Qu Shanshan; Pang Fengyue; Li Dongna; Liu Jia; Xing Wei; Wang Fei; Wang Shimeng	Japan (JPN); Mayu Funada; Naoko Sakuramoto; Momoko Sayama; Rie Usui; Aki Tago; Shiho Kohata; Natsuki Kishikawa; Risa Ikadai; Ami Otaki; Hikari Nakade; Kaoruko Suzuki; Sakiko Ikeda; Aya Noichi; Marina Tanaka; Izumi Osada; Mayu Kubota; Chiho Takahashi; Ami Sugita; Yuko Takeyama; Takako Sugiyama	Brazil (BRA); Domingias Vivioue; Rozeane Souza; Daiane Rodrigues; Renata Diniz; Karen Rocha; Joice Costa; Ketlen Wiggers; Daniele Batista; Débora Oliveira; Thaís Guedes; Mariel Anunciação; Adriana Costa; Giovanna Oliveira; Aline Xavier; Adriana Oliveira; Marcela Leandro; Camila Oliveira; Charly Wendy Derrett
