= 2024–25 Lee Man FC season =

Lee Man
- Chairman: Norman Lee
- Head coach: Tsang Chiu Tat (until 3 Oct 2024); Chu Siu Kei (Interim until 21 Nov 2024); Matthew Holland (until 10 Mar 2025); Chu Siu Kei (Interim until )
- Stadium: Mong Kok Stadium
Home colours	Away colours

The 2024–25 season is Lee Man's 7th season in the top-tier division in Hong Kong football. Lee Man FC will competed in the Premier League, Senior Challenge Shield, FA Cup, Sapling Cup and AFC Champions League Two this season.

== Squad ==
=== First team ===
As of 10 June 2024

Squad No.	Name	Nationality	Date of birth (age)	Previous club	Contract since	Contract end
Goalkeepers
1	Leung Hing Kit	(Hong Kong)	22 October 1989 (age 36)	(Hong Kong) Sham Shui Po	2024	2025
25	Poon Sheung-Hei	(Hong Kong) (United States)	29 September 2006 (age 19)	Youth Team	2023	2025
28	Chan Ka Ho	(Hong Kong)	27 January 1996 (age 30)	(Hong Kong) Yuen Long	2020	2025
Defenders
2	Timothy Chow	(Hong Kong)	11 March 2006 (age 20)	Hong Kong FC	2024	2025
4	Ryoya Tachibana	(Japan)	4 April 1996 (age 30)	(Montenegro) OFK Petrovac (M1)	2022	2025
5	Dudu	(Hong Kong) (Brazil)	17 April 1990 (age 36)	(Hong Kong) Southern	2023	2025
13	Li Ngai Hoi	(Hong Kong)	15 October 1994 (age 31)	Hong Kong Rangers	2023	2025
19	Kim Min-kyu	(South Korea)	7 July 2000 (age 25)	Hong Kong Rangers	2023	2025
22	Jim Ho Chun	(Hong Kong)	2 February 2007 (age 19)	Youth Team	2023	2025
23	Ryan Tafazolli	(England) (Iran)	28 September 1991 (age 34)	(England) Wycombe Wanderers	2025	2025
31	Yung Hui To	(Hong Kong)	11 March 2000 (age 26)	(Hong Kong) Happy Valley	2021	2025
55	Yu Wai Lim	(Hong Kong)	20 September 1998 (age 27)	(China) Wuxi Wugo	2025	2025
Midfielders
6	Wu Chun Ming	(Hong Kong)	27 November 1997 (age 28)	(Hong Kong) Eastern	2023	2025
7	Mitchel Paulissen	(Netherlands)	21 April 1993 (age 33)	(Netherlands) SC Cambuur (N2)	2023	2025
10	Wong Wai	(Hong Kong)	17 September 1992 (age 33)	(Hong Kong) Eastern	2022	2025
12	Law Cheuk Hei	(Hong Kong)	12 November 2004 (age 21)	Youth Team	2019	2025
16	Ngan Lok Fung	(Hong Kong)	26 January 1993 (age 33)	(Hong Kong) Kitchee	2017	2025
18	Tang In Chim	(Hong Kong)	28 February 2003 (age 23)	(Hong Kong) HK U23	2024	2025
21	Wong Long Kaa	(Hong Kong)	30 January 2007 (age 19)	Youth Team	2023	2025
26	Wong Chun Ho	(Hong Kong)	31 May 1990 (age 35)	(Hong Kong) Pegasus	2020	2025
Forwards
8	Everton Camargo	(Hong Kong) (Brazil)	25 May 1991 (age 35)	(Hong Kong) Eastern	2022	2025
9	Henri Anier	(Estonia)	17 December 1990 (age 35)	(Thailand) Muangthong United (T1)	2023	2025
11	Cheng Siu Kwan	(Hong Kong)	13 January 1997 (age 29)	Hong Kong Rangers	2018	2025
17	Chang Hei Yin	(Hong Kong)	6 April 2000 (age 26)	(Hong Kong) Pegasus	2020	2025
20	Paulinho Simionato	(Brazil)	17 August 1989 (age 36)	(Hong Kong) Tai Po	2023	2025
91	Samuel Rosa	(Brazil)	25 February 1991 (age 35)	(Thailand) PT Prachuap (T1)	2024	2025
99	Taufee Skandari	(Afghanistan)	2 April 1999 (age 27)	(Indonesia) PSIS Semarang (I1)	2025	2025
Players who have played but left the team mid-season
14	Jiloan Hamad	(Iraq) (Sweden) (Azerbaijan)	6 November 1990 (age 35)	(Thailand) Uthai Thani (T1)	2024	2025
27	Gaizka Martínez	(Spain)	27 October 1996 (age 29)	(Spain) Sestao River Club (S5)	2023	2025

=== U22 ===
As of 10 June 2024

Squad No.	Name	Nationality	Date of birth (age)	Previous club	Contract since	Contract end
Goalkeepers
Defenders
	Alvan Chan Chun-Hei	(Hong Kong)	7 November 2006 (age 19)	Hong Kong Rangers Youth	2024	2025
	Kwong Tin-Lok	(Hong Kong)	4 October 2007 (age 18)	(Hong Kong) South China Youth	2024	2025
	Chester Cheng Tsz-Ho	(Hong Kong)	10 July 2007 (age 18)	Youth Team	2024	2025
	Wong Siu-Hei	(Hong Kong)	26 August 2007 (age 18)	Youth Team	2024	2025
	Yeung Lok-Him	(Hong Kong)	20 January 2008 (age 18)	Youth Team	2024	2025
Midfielders
	Ng Tsz-Hin	(Hong Kong)	28 January 2005 (age 21)	(Hong Kong) Kowloon City Youth	2024	2025
	Nevin Tam Long-Fung	(Hong Kong)	6 February 2006 (age 20)	Youth Team	2024	2025
	Ng Sheung-Wang	(Hong Kong)	23 October 2006 (age 19)	Youth Team	2024	2025
	Lee Man-Lok	(Hong Kong)	21 August 2007 (age 18)	Youth Team	2024	2025
	Yeung Li-Yuen	(Hong Kong)	18 October 2007 (age 18)	Youth Team	2024	2025
	Li Hok-Yin	(Hong Kong)	27 February 2007 (age 19)	Youth Team	2024	2025
	Hui Siu-Chung	(Hong Kong)	4 April 2008 (age 18)	Youth Team	2024	2025
	Wong Pak-Kiu	(Hong Kong)	21 October 2008 (age 17)	Youth Team	2024	2025
	Chan Chung-Yin	(Hong Kong)	2 February 2008 (age 18)	Youth Team	2024	2025
	Yiu Man-Ho	(Hong Kong)	27 May 2008 (age 18)	Youth Team	2024	2025
	Wong Siu-Hei	(Hong Kong)	26 August 2008 (age 17)	Youth Team	2024	2025
	Nathan Yau Leong-Yan	(Hong Kong)	1 January 2008 (age 18)	Youth Team	2024	2025
Forwards
	Hon Shing-Wing	(Hong Kong)	21 November 2006 (age 19)	Youth Team	2024	2025
	So Tsz-Yin	(Hong Kong)	7 June 2006 (age 19)	Youth Team	2024	2025
	Lau Yu-Ho	(Hong Kong)	12 January 2006 (age 20)	Youth Team	2024	2025
	Yeung Long-Yat	(Hong Kong)	5 August 2006 (age 19)	Youth Team	2024	2025
	Cheung Pak-Wing	(Hong Kong)	20 July 2008 (age 17)	Youth Team	2024	2025
Players who have played but left the team mid-season

== Transfers ==
=== Transfers in ===
Pre-Season

Position	Player	Transferred from	Ref
GK	(Hong Kong) Leung Hing Kit	(Hong Kong) Sham Shui Po	Free
DF	(Hong Kong) Timothy Chow	Hong Kong FC	Free
DF	(South Korea) Kim Min-kyu	Hong Kong Rangers	Free
DF	(Spain) Gaizka Martínez	(Spain) Sestao River Club	Free
MF	(Iraq) (Sweden) (Azerbaijan) Jiloan Hamad	(Thailand) Uthai Thani	Free
MF	(Hong Kong) Tang In Chim	(Hong Kong) HK U23	Free
FW	(Brazil) Samuel Rosa	(Thailand) PT Prachuap	Free

Mid-Season

Position	Player	Transferred from	Ref
DF	(England) (Iran) Ryan Tafazolli	(England) Wycombe Wanderers	Loan
DF	(Hong Kong) Yu Wai Lim	(China) Wuxi Wugo	Free
MF	(Afghanistan) Taufee Skandari	(Indonesia) PSIS Semarang	Free

Post-Season

Position	Player	Transferred from	Ref
DF	(Hong Kong) Tsang Yi Hang	(Hong Kong) HK U23	Free
DF	(Uzbekistan) Dostonbek Tursunov	(Uzbekistan) FC Khorazm	Free
DF	(Brazil) Willian Gaúcho	(Hong Kong) Kowloon City	Free
MF	(Hong Kong) (Israel) Barak Braunshtain	Hong Kong Rangers	Free
MF	(Georgia (country)) Merab Gigauri	(Georgia (country)) FC Torpedo Kutaisi	Free
MF	(Brazil) Mikael	(United Arab Emirates) Emirates Club	Free
FW	(Hong Kong) Poon Pui Hin	(Hong Kong) Kitchee FC	Free
FW	(Ghana) (Spain) Noah Baffoe	(Hong Kong) Eastern	Undisclosed
FW	(Japan) (England) Cy Goddard	(India) Hyderabad	Free
FW	(Hong Kong) Lau Ka Kiu	(Hong Kong) HK U23	Free

=== Transfers Out ===
Pre-Season

Position	Player	Transferred To	Ref
GK	(Hong Kong) Ko Chun Wilson	(Hong Kong) Resources Capital	Free
GK	(Hong Kong) Hui Zachary	(Hong Kong) Kln City District	Free
GK	(Hong Kong) Yuen Ho Chun	(Hong Kong) Kowloon City	Free
DF	(Spain) José Ángel	Retired	Free
DF	(Hong Kong) (Spain) Fernando Recio	Retired	N.A.
DF	(Hong Kong) Fung Hing Wa	Retired	N.A.
DF	(Hong Kong) Tsui Wang Kit	(China) Yunnan Yukun	Free
DF	(Hong Kong) Yu Wai Lim	(China) Wuxi Wugo	Free
DF	(Hong Kong) Yu Pui Hong	(Hong Kong) Kowloon City	Free
DF	(Hong Kong) (Brazil) Diego Eli	(Hong Kong) Kowloon City	Free
MF	(Argentina) Jonatan Acosta	(Hong Kong) Southern	Free
FW	(Hong Kong) Hon Shing Wing	(Hong Kong) Lee Man U22	Free
FW	(Hong Kong) Yeung Long Yat	(Hong Kong) Lee Man U22	Free
FW	(Hong Kong) (Spain) Manolo Bleda	(Hong Kong) Eastern SC	Free
FW	(Brazil) Gil	(Thailand) Chanthaburi	Free

Mid-Season

Position	Player	Transferred To	Ref
DF	(Spain) Gaizka Martínez	(Spain) Sestao River Club	Free
MF	(Iraq) (Sweden) (Azerbaijan) Jiloan Hamad	(Iraq) Zakho SC	Free

Post-Season

Position	Player	Transferred To	Ref
DF	(Hong Kong) Timothy Chow	(Hong Kong)	Free
DF	(Hong Kong) Jim Ho Chun	(Hong Kong) Southern	Free
DF	(South Korea) Kim Min-kyu	Hong Kong Rangers	Free
DF	(England) (Iran) Ryan Tafazolli	(England) Wycombe Wanderers	End of Loan
MF	(Hong Kong) Tang In Chim	(Hong Kong) Kowloon City	Free
MF	(Hong Kong) Wong Chun Ho	(Hong Kong) Kowloon City	Free
MF	(Hong Kong) Wong Long Kaa	(Hong Kong) Eastern District SA	Free
MF	(Hong Kong) Law Cheuk Hei	(Hong Kong) Northern	Season loan
MF	(Netherlands) Mitchel Paulissen	(Netherlands) Roda FC	Free
FW	(Afghanistan) Taufee Skandari	(Afghanistan) Abu Muslim FC	Free
FW	(Estonia) Henri Anier	(Hong Kong) Kitchee SC	Free
FW	(Brazil) Paulinho Simionato	(Hong Kong) Tai Po	Free
FW	(Brazil) Samuel Rosa	(United Arab Emirates) Hatta Club	Free
FW	(Hong Kong) Chang Hei Yin	(Hong Kong) Eastern District SA	Season loan

== Club official ==
Position	Staff
Interim head coach	(Hong Kong) Chu Siu Kei
Assistant coach	(Hong Kong) Szeto Man Chun
Goalkeeping coach	(Hong Kong) Cheng Ho Man
Fitness coach	(Hong Kong) Lee Kin Wai
Analytical coach	(Hong Kong) Kwok Chun Lam

== Team statistics ==
=== Appearances and goals ===
As of 25 May 2025

No.	Pos.	Player	HKPL		FA Cup		Sapling Cup		Challenge Shield		AFC Champions League Two		Total	
No.	Pos.	Player	Apps.	Goals	Apps.	Goals	Apps.	Goals	Apps.	Goals	Apps.	Goals	Apps.	Goals
1	GK	(Hong Kong) Leung Hing Kit	0	0	0	0	0	0	1	0	1	0	2	0
2	DF	(Hong Kong) Timothy Chow	6+4	0	0	0	4	0	2	0	5+1	0	22	0
4	DF	(Japan) Ryoya Tachibana	19+2	1	0+1	0	5	0	3	0	4+2	0	36	1
5	DF	(Hong Kong) (Brazil) Dudu	13	3	0	0	1	0	1	0	4	0	19	3
6	MF	(Hong Kong) Wu Chun Ming	14+4	0	0	0	3	0	2+1	0	4+2	0	30	0
7	MF	(Netherlands) Mitchel Paulissen	19+1	4	1	0	5	0	1+1	0	6	0	34	4
8	FW	(Hong Kong) (Brazil) Everton Camargo	22	19	0	0	2	0	3	1	6	0	33	20
9	FW	(Estonia) Henri Anier	16+5	11	1	1	2+1	1	3	5	5+1	0	34	18
10	MF	(Hong Kong) Wong Wai	13+2	2	1	0	2	0	2	0	2	0	22	2
11	FW	(Hong Kong) Cheng Siu Kwan	4+6	0	0+1	0	2+2	0	0+2	0	0+3	0	20	0
12	MF	(Hong Kong) Law Cheuk Hei	1	0	0+1	0	4	1	0+1	0	0	0	7	1
13	DF	(Hong Kong) Li Ngai Hoi	15+7	1	1	0	2+2	0	2	0	6	1	35	2
16	MF	(Hong Kong) Ngan Lok Fung	6+7	0	0	0	0	0	1+1	0	3+3	0	21	0
17	FW	(Hong Kong) Chang Hei Yin	2+8	0	0	0	1	0	1+1	0	0+3	0	16	0
18	MF	(Hong Kong) Tang In Chim	0+3	0	0	0	2+3	0	0+1	0	0	0	9	0
19	DF	(South Korea) Kim Min-kyu	11+5	0	0	0	1+2	0	1+1	0	2+2	0	25	0
20	FW	(Brazil) Paulinho Simionato	9+7	5	1	0	1+3	0	0+1	0	1+3	0	26	5
21	MF	(Hong Kong) Wong Long Kaa	0	0	0	0	0+1	0	0	0	0	0	1	0
22	DF	(Hong Kong) Jim Ho Chun	0	0	0	0	0+1	0	0	0	0	0	1	0
23	DF	(England) (Iran) Ryan Tafazolli	12	1	1	0	2	0	0	0	0	0	15	1
25	GK	(Hong Kong) Poon Sheung-Hei	0	0	0	0	5	0	0	0	0	0	5	0
26	MF	(Hong Kong) Wong Chun Ho	11+8	0	1	0	2+2	0	2	0	2+1	0	29	0
28	GK	(Hong Kong) Chan Ka Ho	24	0	1	0	0	0	2	0	5	0	32	0
30	MF	(Hong Kong) Hui Siu-Chung	0	0	0	0	0+1	0	0	0	0	0	1	0
31	DF	(Hong Kong) Yung Hui To	0+1	0	0	0	0+1	0	0	0	1	0	3	0
47	MF	(Hong Kong) Lau Ka Kiu	1+3	0	0	0	0	0	0+1	0	0	0	5	0
55	DF	(Hong Kong) Yu Wai Lim	6+5	0	1	0	1	0	1	0	0	0	14	0
91	FW	(Brazil) Samuel Rosa	18+3	6	1	0	3+1	1	1	0	5+1	1	33	8
99	FW	(Afghanistan) Taufee Skandari	5+5	0	1	0	0	0	1	0	0	0	12	0
Players who have played but left permanently or on loan
14	MF	(Iraq) (Sweden) (Azerbaijan) Jiloan Hamad	5+1	0	0	0	2	0	1	1	3+3	0	14	1
27	DF	(Spain) Gaizka Martínez	2+1	0	0	0	3	1	0	0	1	0	7	1

== Competitions ==
=== Hong Kong Premier League ===
31 August 2024 1	Southern	1–2	Lee Man	Aberdeen, Hong Kong Island
16:00	Gregory 15'; Chak Ting Fung (yellow card) 23'; Chan Yun Tung (yellow card) 59'; Chan Hoi Pak (yellow card) 90+11'	Report	Everton Camargo 25'; Paulinho 90+8'; Wu Chun Ming (yellow card) 23'; Kim Min-kyu (yellow card) 57'	Stadium: Aberdeen Sports Ground; Attendance: 785; Referee: Liu Kwok Man

14 September 2024 2	Tai Po	2–1	Lee Man	Tai Po, New Territories
16:00	Lucas 68'; Renner 76'; Weverton Rangel (yellow card) 11'; Lee Ka Ho (yellow card) 20'; Paulinho (yellow card) 67'; Ka Wing Tse (yellow card) 90+7'	Report	Everton Camargo 21' (yellow card) 90+9'; Mitchel Paulissen (yellow card) 10'; Ryoya Tachibana (yellow card) 28'; Li Ngai Hoi (yellow card) 35'	Stadium: Tai Po Sports Ground; Attendance: 1,454; Referee: Luk Kin Sun

22 September 2024 3	Lee Man	3–1	HKFC	Tseung Kwan O, New Territories
16:00	Samuel Rosa 25'; Paulinho 60'; Everton Camargo 69'; Mitchel Paulissen (yellow card) 43'	Report	Hoi To Lai (yellow card) 40'; Gustavo Henrique (yellow card) 45+5'; Toby Down (yellow card) 50'; Andy Russell 84' (yellow card) 85'	Stadium: Tseung Kwan O Sports Ground; Attendance: 358; Referee: Tang Hing Fu

28 September 2024 4	Lee Man	2–1	Rangers	Tseung Kwan O, New Territories
18:30	Everton Camargo 45+3'; Henri Anier 64' (yellow card) 90+3'	Report	Chang Kwong Yin 7'; Luizinho (yellow card) 30'; Shunya Suganuma (yellow card) 90+2'; Makoto Rindo (yellow card) 90+6'	Stadium: Tseung Kwan O Sports Ground; Attendance: 461; Referee: Yu Kin Fung

6 October 2024 5	Lee Man	1–2	Eastern	Tseung Kwan O, New Territories
18:00	Mitchel Paulissen 58' (pen.) (yellow card) 54'; Henri Anier (yellow card) 44'; Li Ngai Hoi (yellow card) 71'; Timothy Chow (yellow card) 90+3'	Report	Ma Hei Wai 21'; Marcos Gondra 64' (yellow card) 50'; Yu Joy Yin (yellow card) 90+3'	Stadium: Tseung Kwan O Sports Ground; Attendance: 1,050; Referee: Liu Kwok Man

20 October 2024 6	Lee Man	4–1	North District	Tseung Kwan O, New Territories
18:00	Mitchel Paulissen 38' (yellow card) 68'; Everton Camargo 76'; Yip Cheuk Man 82' (o.g.); Henri Anier 90+3'; Ngan Lok Fung (yellow card) 88'	Report	Matheus Chulapa 42'; Law Hiu Chung (yellow card) 74'; Chu Wai Kwan (yellow card) 84'	Stadium: Tseung Kwan O Sports Ground; Referee: Lau Fong-hei

2 November 2024 7	Kitchee	1–1	Lee Man	Mong Kok, Kowloon
18:00	Poon Pui Hin 45+1'; Ruslan Mingazow (yellow card) 14'; Jordan Lam (yellow card) 20'; Matheus Dantas (yellow card) 70'; Luís Machado (yellow card) 81'; Aarón Rey (yellow card) 90+1'	Report	Henri Anier 35' (yellow card) 10'; Mitchel Paulissen (yellow card) 38'; Dudu (yellow card) 78'; Ryoya Tachibana (yellow card) 83'; Everton Camargo (yellow card) 90+3'	Stadium: Mong Kok Stadium; Attendance: 1,682; Referee: Liu Kwok Man

9 November 2024 8	Lee Man	3–1	Kowloon City	Tseung Kwan O, New Territories
18:00	Dudu 56'; Everton 72'; Rosa 83'; Lee Keun Ho (yellow card) 24'; Diego Eli (yellow card) 45'	Report	Hui Ka Lok 52'; Li Ngai Hoi (yellow card) 45+3'; Ngan Lok Fung (yellow card) 86'	Stadium: Tseung Kwan O Sports Ground; Attendance: 453; Referee: Lau Fong Hei

11 January 2025 9	Tai Po	1–0	Lee Man	Tai Po, New Territories
15:00	Lucas Silva 9' (yellow card) 84'; Marcão (yellow card) 27'; Gabriel Cividini (yellow card) 83'; Kwun-Ming Fung (yellow card) 90+4'	Report	Li Ngai Hoi (yellow card) 61'; Mitchel Paulissen (yellow card) 90+7'	Stadium: Tai Po Sports Ground; Attendance: 1,233; Referee: Wong Wai-lun

19 January 2025 10	Rangers	1–2	Lee Man	Tsing Yi, New Territories
15:00	Luizinho 78' (pen.) (yellow card) 45'; Ryota Hayashi (yellow card) 73'	Report	Everton 45+2' (pen.); Paulinho 47'; Dudu (yellow card) 77'; Samuel Rosa (yellow card) 90+3'	Stadium: Tsing Yi Sports Ground; Attendance: 429; Referee: Liu Kwok Man

25 January 2025 11	Lee Man	4–3	North District	Tseung Kwan O, New Territories
18:00	Everton 66', 90+10'; Paulinho 73'; Li Ngai Hoi 90+7'	Report	Lo Kong Wai 26'; Ho Chun Ting 64'; Gudula 85'; Elian Villalobos (yellow card) 7'; Weverton Guilherme (yellow card) 87'; Matheus Chulapa (yellow card) 90'	Stadium: Tseung Kwan O Sports Ground; Attendance: 289; Referee: Tang Hing Fu

8 February 2025 12	Lee Man	3–2	Kowloon City	Tseung Kwan O, New Territories
15:00	Anier 68', 74'; Everton 72' (pen.) (yellow card) 27'; Dudu (yellow card) 45'; Yu Wai Lin (yellow card) 45+4'; Ngan Lok Fong (yellow card) 45'; Ryan Tafazolli (yellow card) 78'	Report	Kayron 24' (pen.); Willian 64' (yellow card) 43'; Yuen Ho Chun (yellow card) 78'	Stadium: Tseung Kwan O Sports Ground; Attendance: 422; Referee: Cheung Wai Lung

16 February 2025 13	Eastern	3–4	Lee Man	Mong Kok, Kowloon
18:00	Gondra 45+6' (yellow card) 14'; Jojo 48'; Leung Chun Pong 57'; Víctor Bertomeu (red card) 89'	Report	Wong Wai 19', 79'; Rosa 71'; Paulinho 77'	Stadium: Mong Kok Stadium; Attendance: 1,202; Referee: Yu Kin Fung

22 February 2025 14	Lee Man	3–0	HKFC	Tseung Kwan O, New Territories
18:00	Everton 50' (90+2) (yellow card) 58'; Anier 86'; Paulinho 62'	Report	Jack Sealy (yellow card) 72' (yellow-red card)	Stadium: Tseung Kwan O Sports Ground; Attendance: 308; Referee: Tang Hing Fu

9 March 2025 15	Lee Man	1–1	Southern	Tseung Kwan O, New Territories
18:00	Samuel Rosa 72'; Wong Wai (yellow card) 63'; Paulo Simionato (red card) 69'; Yu Wai Lim (yellow card) 75'; Taufee Skandari (yellow card) 90+6'; Li Ngai Hoi (yellow card) 90+11'	Report	Song Ju-ho 6'; Wong Ho Yin (yellow card) 90'	Stadium: Tseung Kwan O Sports Ground; Attendance: 381; Referee: Wong Po-sing

15 March 2025 16	Kitchee	0–1	Lee Man	Mong Kok, Kowloon
18:00	Juninho (yellow card) 28'; Sherzod Temirov (yellow card) 33'; Law Tsz Chun (yellow card) 58'	Report	Everton 67'; Ryoya Tachibana (yellow card) 62'; Samuel Rosa (yellow card) 77'; Mitchel Paulissen (yellow card) 78'; Li Ngai Hoi (yellow card) 81'; Wu Chun Ming (yellow card) 87'	Stadium: Mong Kok Stadium; Referee: Wong Wai-lun

30 March 2025 17	Lee Man	3–7	Tai Po	Tseung Kwan O, New Territories
18:00	Henri Anier 60', 86'; Everton Camargo 73' (yellow card) 47'; Yu Wai Lim (yellow card) 27'; Kim Min-kyu (yellow card) 90'	Report	Igor Sartori 18', 26' (pen.); Michel Renner Lopes Antunes 45+5', 67', 77'; Chan Siu Kwan 69'; Patrick Valverde 75'	Stadium: Tseung Kwan O Sports Ground

5 April 2025 18	Southern	0–1	Lee Man	Aberdeen, Hong Kong Island
15:00	Kessi (yellow card) 41'; Kota Kawase (red card) 85'; Song Ju-ho (yellow card) 90+3'	Report	Everton Camargo 5'; Ryoya Tachibana (yellow card) 88'; Taufee Skandari (yellow card) 90+3'	Stadium: Aberdeen Sports Ground; Attendance: 502; Referee: Lau Fong-hei

12 April 2025 19	Lee Man	4–0	Kitchee	Tseung Kwan O, New Territories
18:00	Everton Camargo 3'; Dudu 31' (yellow card) 21'; Henri Anier 58'; Mitchel Paulissen 60'	Report	Aaron Rey (yellow card) 30'; Juninho (yellow card) 45'	Stadium: Tseung Kwan O Sports Ground; Attendance: 634; Referee: Lau Fong-hei

26 April 2025 20	Lee Man	2–1	Eastern	Tseung Kwan O, New Territories
18:00	Dudu 67'; Ryoya Tachibana 70'; Ryan Tafazolli (yellow card) 20'; Wong Wai (yellow card) 27'; Wong Chun Ho (yellow card) 64'	Report	Lee Chun Ting 82'; Yeung Tung Ki (yellow card) 84'	Stadium: Tseung Kwan O Sports Ground; Attendance: 1,225; Referee: Luk Kin-sun

4 May 2025 21	HKFC	0–4	Lee Man	Happy Valley, Hong Kong Island
16:30		Report	Samuel Rosa 7'; Ryan Tafazolli 37' (yellow card) 45'; Henri Anier 55'; Everton Camargo 87'	Stadium: Hong Kong Football Club Stadium; Referee: Tam Ping-wun

11 May 2025 22	Kowloon City	1–2	Lee Man	Sham Shui Po, Kowloon
15:00	Kayron 90+9'; Fung Tin Wing (yellow card) 69'	Report	Henri Anier 45+5'; Samuel Rosa 90+9'; Ryan Tafazolli (yellow card) 72' (yellow-red card) 89'	Stadium: Sham Shui Po Sports Ground; Attendance: 673; Referee: Yu Kin Fung

17 May 2025 23	North District	0–3	Lee Man	Sheung Shui, New Territories
15:00	Kayron (yellow card) 43'; Law Hiu Chung (yellow card) 58'; Elian Villalobos (yellow card) 84'	Report	Mitchel Paulissen 31'; Everton Camargo 32', 84' (yellow card) 54'; Wu Chun Ming (yellow card) 20'; Kim Min-kyu (yellow card) 36'; Paulinho (yellow card) 56'	Stadium: North District Sports Ground; Attendance: 526; Referee: Lau Fong-hei

25 May 2025 24	Rangers	3–0	Lee Man	Tsing Yi, New Territories
15:00	Guilherme Biteco 74'; Lau Chi Kok 86', 89'; Derek Leung (yellow card) 5'	Report	Cheng Siu Kwan (yellow card) 3'; Ryoya Tachibana (yellow card) 33' (yellow-red card) 51'; Mitchel Paulissen (yellow card) 83'	Stadium: Tsing Yi Sports Ground; Referee: Wong Wai-lun

Pos	Team	Pld	W	D	L	GF	GA	GD	Pts	Qualification or relegation
1	Tai Po (C)	24	17	4	3	62	31	+31	55	Qualification for AFC Champions League Two group stage
2	Lee Man	24	17	2	5	54	33	+21	53	
3	Eastern	24	15	6	3	54	25	+29	51	Qualification for AFC Champions League Two group stage (Note: Eastern qualified for the AFC Champions League Two group stage as the 2024–25 Hong Kong FA Cup winners.)
4	Kitchee	24	12	6	6	55	25	+30	42	
5	Southern	24	7	7	10	34	35	−1	28	

Source: Hong Kong Football Association
Rules for classification: 1) Points; 2) Head-to-head points; 3) Head-to-head goal difference; 4) Head-to-head goals scored; 5) Goal difference; 6) Goals scored; 7) Fair-play points; 8) Drawing lots (Play-off if the winner has to be decided).
(C) Champions

=== Hong Kong Sapling Cup ===
12 October 2024 Group Match 1	Rangers	0–1	Lee Man	Mong Kok, Kowloon
15:00	Loong Tsz Hin (yellow card) 62'	Report	Gaiza Martínez 63' (yellow card) 90'; Tang In Chim (yellow card) 28'; Ryoya Tachibana (yellow card) 45'; Wong Long Kaa Jan (yellow card) 85'	Stadium: Mong Kok Stadium; Attendance: 574; Referee: Wong Wai Lun

17 November 2024 Group Match 2	Lee Man	0–1	Southern	Siu Sai Wan, Hong Kong Island
18:00		Report	Chan Hoi Pak 58'; Chan Yun Tung (yellow card) 74'	Stadium: Siu Sai Wan Sports Ground; Attendance: 410; Referee: Ho Wai-sing

15 December 2024 Group Match 3	Kowloon City	1–4	Lee Man	Sham Shui Po, Kowloon
15:00	Yu Pui Hong 71'; Ho Lung Ho (yellow card) 79'	Report	Rosa 7' (yellow card) 90'; Seong Min-gyu 42' (o.g.); Law Cheuk Hei 53'; Yu Pui Hong 59' (o.g.)	Stadium: Sham Shui Po Sports Ground; Attendance: 455; Referee: Tang Hing Fu

16 April 2025 Semi Final	Tai Po	1–1 (a.e.t.) (2–4 p)	Lee Man	Mong Kok, Kowloon
20:00	Moreno 90+3'; Fung Kwun Ming (yellow card) 54'; Ítalo Montaño (yellow card) 60'; Kevin Padilla (yellow card) 62'; Patrick Valverde (yellow card) 105+2'	Report	Henri Anier 82' (pen.); Law Cheuk Hei (yellow card) 90+3'; Li Ngai Hoi (yellow card) 54'; Tang Im-ching (yellow card) 120'	Stadium: Mong Kok Stadium; Attendance: 1,133; Referee: Liu Kwok Man
	Penalties
	Lucas (penalty scored); Valverde (penalty scored); Montaño (penalty missed); Moreno (penalty missed)		(penalty scored) Simionato; (penalty scored) Tafazolli; (penalty scored) Everton; (penalty scored) Tachibana

1 May 2025 Final	Lee Man	0–4	Southern	Mong Kok, Kowloon
17:30	Everton (yellow card) 5'; Timothy Chow (yellow card) 77'; Matheus Dantes (yellow card) 88'	Report	Acosta 25'; Pereira 32'; Kessi 35'; Ichikawa 67'; Chak Ting Fung (yellow card) 41'; Song Ju-ho (yellow card) 88'; Kessi (yellow card) 90+2'	Stadium: Mong Kok Stadium; Attendance: 3,072; Referee: Lau Fong Hei

=== Hong Kong FA Cup ===
1 March 2025	Lee Man	1–2	Rangers	Tsing Yi
18:30	Henri Anier 58'	Report	Luiz Humberto 32'; Ryota Hayashi 85'	Stadium: Tsing Yi Sports Ground; Attendance: 394; Referee: Luk Kin-sun

=== Hong Kong Senior Challenge Shield ===
27 October 2024 Quarter Final	Lee Man	5–1	North District	Tai Po, New Territories
15:00	Anier 9', 45', 52', 65'; Hamad 38'	Report	Lo Kong Wai 38'; Law Hiu Chung (yellow card) 26'	Stadium: Tai Po Sports Ground; Attendance: 327; Referee: Tam Ping Wun

1 December 2024 Semi Final	Lee Man	2–1	Kitchee	Mong Kok, Kowloon
15:00	Anier 16'; Everton 47'; Ngan Lok Fung (yellow card) 26'; Paulinho Simionato (yellow card) 90+1'; Wu Chun-Ming (yellow card) 90+3'	Report	Temirov 45+4'; Bae Jae-woo (yellow card) 34'; Juninho (yellow card) 85'	Stadium: Mong Kok Stadium; Attendance: 1,573; Referee: Lau Fong Hei

30 January 2025 Final	Eastern	1–0	Lee Man	Mong Kok, Kowloon
15:00	Bertomeu 32'; Leung Kwun Chung (yellow card) 15'; Alexander Jojo (yellow card) 42'; Aleksandar Mitrović (yellow card) 52'	Report	Wong Chun Ho (yellow card) 38'; Ryoya Tachibana (yellow card) 55'; Mitchel Paulissen (yellow card) 60'; Lau Ka Kiu (yellow card) 82'	Stadium: Mong Kok Stadium; Attendance: 4,495; Referee: Ho Wai Sing

=== AFC Champions League Two ===
==== Group stage ====
18 September 2024 1	Lee Man (Hong Kong)	0–2	(Vietnam) Nam Định	Mong Kok, Hong Kong
20:00 UTC+8	Everton Camargo (yellow card) 71'	Report	Rafaelson 27'; Lucas Silva 73'; Lý Công Hoàng Anh (yellow card) 61'	Stadium: Mong Kok Stadium (Note: Lee Man played their home matches at Mong Kok Stadium, Hong Kong, instead of their regular home stadium Tseung Kwan O Sports Ground, Hong Kong.); Attendance: 2,147; Referee: Ali Reda (Lebanon)

2 October 2024 2	BG Tampines Rovers (Singapore)	3–1	(Hong Kong) Lee Man	Jalan Besar, Singapore
	Boris Kopitović 45+3' (pen.); Faris Ramli 65'; Seia Kunori 75'; Miloš Zlatković (yellow card) 63'; Kyoga Nakamura (yellow card) 79'	Report	Li Ngai Hoi 4' (yellow card) 89'	Stadium: Jalan Besar Stadium (Note: Tampines Rovers played their home matches at Jalan Besar Stadium, Kallang, instead of their regular home stadium Our Tampines Hub, Tampines.); Attendance: 883; Referee: Kim Woo-sung (South Korea)

24 October 2024 3	Lee Man (Hong Kong)	0–1	(Thailand) Bangkok United	Mong Kok, Hong Kong
	Ryoya Tachibana (yellow card) 66'; Dudu (yellow card) 77'	Report	Bassel Jradi 28'; Richairo Živković (yellow card) 45'; Weerathep Pomphan (yellow card) 76'	Stadium: Mong Kok Stadium; Attendance: 892; Referee: Ismaeel Habib Ali (Bahrain)

6 November 2024 4	Bangkok United (Thailand)	4–1	(Hong Kong) Lee Man	Rangsit, Thailand
	Richairo Zivkovic 67', 90+3'; Wanchai Jarunongkran 73'; Muhsen Al-Ghassani 78'	Report	Samuel Rosa 41'	Stadium: Thammasat Stadium; Attendance: 1,241; Referee: Mohammad Ghabayen (Jordan)

27 November 2024 5	Nam Định (Vietnam)	3–0	(Hong Kong) Lee Man	Nam Định, Vietnam
19:00 UTC+7	Lucas Silva 11'; Tô Văn Vũ 29'; Rafaelson 43' (pen.)	Report		Stadium: Thiên Trường Stadium; Attendance: 8,318; Referee: Hanna Hattab (Syria)

4 December 2024 6	Lee Man (Hong Kong)	0–0	(Singapore) BG Tampines Rovers	Mong Kok, Hong Kong
	Everton Camargo (yellow card) 22'	Report	Irfan Najeeb (yellow card) 81'	Stadium: Mong Kok Stadium; Referee: Yoshimi Yamashita (Japan)

Pos	Team	Pld	W	D	L	GF	GA	GD	Pts	Qualification	BKU	NDI	TAM	LMC
1	(Thailand) Bangkok United	6	4	1	1	12	6	+6	13	Advance to round of 16	—	3–2	4–2	4–1
2	(Vietnam) Nam Định	6	3	2	1	13	8	+5	11	Advance to round of 16	0–0	—	3–2	3–0
3	(Singapore) Tampines Rovers	6	2	2	2	11	11	0	8		1–0	3–3	—	3–1
4	(Hong Kong) Lee Man	6	0	1	5	2	13	−11	1		0–1	0–2	0–0	—

Source: AFC
Rules for classification: Tiebreakers

=== Hong Kong U22 League ===
19 March 2025 1 (Rescheduled)	Eastern	0–3	Lee Man	Tseung Kwan O, New Territories
20:30		Report		Stadium: Jockey Club HKFA Football Training Centre

15 October 2024 2	Lee Man	0–0	Kitchee	Siu Sai Wan, Eastern District
19:30		Report		Stadium: Siu Sai Wan Sports Ground

30 October 2024 3	Lee Man	0–2	Southern	Tseung Kwan O, New Territories
20:30		Report	Easant Gurung 35'; Sohgo Ichikawa 71'	Stadium: Jockey Club HKFA Football Training Centre

13 November 2024 4	Lee Man	0–3	HKFC	Tseung Kwan O, New Territories
20:30		Report	Ho Kai Chi 10'; Bradley Leong 45+2'; Kwok Yat Pat 90'	Stadium: Jockey Club HKFA Football Training Centre

20 November 2024 5	Tai Po	2–1	Lee Man	Tseung Kwan O, New Territories
20:30	Lee Lok Him 52', 90'	Report	Lau Yu Ho 40'	Stadium: Jockey Club HKFA Football Training Centre

11 December 2024 6	Lee Man	0–4	Eastern	Tseung Kwan O, New Territories
20:30		Report	Liu Hing Yau 37', 48'; Yeung Tung Ki 56'; Chui Wai Lok 79'	Stadium: Jockey Club HKFA Football Training Centre

18 December 2024 7	Lee Man	0–4	North District	Tin Shui Wai, Hong Kong
20:30		Report	Kendy Renato 25'; Wong Wai Kwok 47'; Wong Wai Chun 83'; Benjamin Eloy 85'	Stadium: Tin Yip Road Park

7 January 2025 8	Lee Man	0–3	Rangers	Siu Sai Wan, Eastern District
20:30		Report	Lee Ching 38'; Ma Yung Sang 47', 90'	Stadium: Siu Sai Wan Sports Ground

22 January 2025 9	Lee Man	1–2	Kitchee	Tseung Kwan O, New Territories
20:30	Hon Shing Wing 55'	Report	Li Siu Hin 15'; Jason Kam 83'	Stadium: Jockey Club HKFA Football Training Centre

5 February 2025 10	Southern	3–0	Lee Man	Tseung Kwan O, New Territories
20:30	Gregory 5'; Easant Gurung 48'; Yau Cheuk-Fung 65'	Report		Stadium: Jockey Club HKFA Football Training Centre

12 February 2025 11	HKFC	4–1	Lee Man	Tseung Kwan O, New Territories
20:30	Tristan Verkade 10', 26'; Chen Hao 32'; Chen Max 62'	Report	Cheng Yui-Him Zachary 58'	Stadium: Jockey Club HKFA Football Training Centre

26 February 2025 12	Lee Man	1–5	Tai Po	Tseung Kwan O, New Territories
20:30	Yeung Yat Long 65'	Report	Fung Kwun Ming 24'; Kevin Padilla 40' (pen.); Patrick Valverde 45'; Chung Wai Keung 59', 67'	Stadium: Jockey Club HKFA Football Training Centre

12 March 2025 13	Rangers	7–1	Lee Man	Tseung Kwan O, New Territories
20:30	Vito Wong To Lam 11', 43'; Barak Braunshtain 32'; Luizinho 33'; Ma Yung Sang 66'; Sebastián Nicot 81'; Leung Hoi-Chun 86'	Report	Alvan Chan Chun-Hei 68'	Stadium: Jockey Club HKFA Football Training Centre

26 March 2025 14	North District	3–1	Lee Man	Tin Shui Wai, Hong Kong
20:30	Benjamin Eloy Tandy Ortega 27', 69'; Ng Pak Hei 65'	Report	Hon Shing Wing 40'	Stadium: Tin Yip Road Park

League table

Pos	Team	Pld	W	D	L	GF	GA	GD	Pts	Qualification or relegation
1	Rangers	14	12	0	2	46	15	+31	36	Winner
2	Southern	14	10	1	3	23	11	+12	31	
3	Tai Po	14	9	1	4	33	21	+12	28	
4	Kitchee	14	8	1	5	30	16	+14	25	
5	HKFC	14	6	1	7	30	23	+7	19	
6	North District	14	4	1	9	22	40	−18	13	
7	Eastern	14	3	0	11	13	38	−25	9	
8	Lee Man	14	1	1	12	9	42	−33	4	

Updated to match(es) played on 31 May 2025. Source: Hong Kong Football Association
Rules for classification: 1) Points; 2) Head-to-head points; 3) Head-to-head goal difference; 4) Head-to-head goals scored; 5) Goal difference; 6) Goals scored; 7) Fair-play points; 8) Drawing lots (Play-off if the winner has to be decided).

=== Hong Kong U22 FA Cup ===
7 May 2025 Quarter Final	Lee Man	0–1	Eastern	Tseung Kwan O, New Territories
		Report	Gao Ming Ho 45+1' (pen.)	Stadium: Jockey Club HKFA Football Training Centre
