= Football at the 2011 Summer Universiade – Women's tournament =

The women's tournament of football at the 2011 Summer Universiade in China began on August 11 and ended on August 22.

== Teams ==
Africa	Americas	Asia	Europe
South Africa	Brazil; Canada; Mexico	China; Chinese Taipei; Japan; South Korea	Estonia; France; Great Britain; Russia

== Preliminary round ==
=== Group A ===
Team	Pld	W	D	L	GF	GA	GD	Pts
China	3	3	0	0	6	2	+4	9
Canada	3	2	0	1	5	1	+4	6
Great Britain	3	0	1	2	3	6	−3	1
Chinese Taipei	3	0	1	2	1	6	−5	1

2011-08-11
16:30

China	2–0	Chinese Taipei
Pang Fengyue 25'; Li Dongna 60'	Report

Bao'an Stadium, Shenzhen
Referee: Fusako Kajiyama (Japan)

2011-08-11
16:30

Great Britain	0–2	Canada
	Report	Gagne 15'; Wright 79'

Athletic Field of Shenzhen University, Shenzhen
Referee: Pannipar Kamnueng (Thailand)

2011-08-13
19:30

Canada	0–1	China
	Report	Wang Shanshan 41'

Bao'an Stadium, Shenzhen
Referee: Pannipar Kamnueng (Thailand)

2011-08-13
16:30

Chinese Taipei	1–1	Great Britain
Tseng Shu-o 42'	Report	Pond 55'

Athletic Field of Shenzhen University, Shenzhen
Referee: Mai Hoang Trang (Vietnam)

2011-08-15
19:30

Canada	3–0	Chinese Taipei
Lagonia 8'; Gagne 13'; Baggott 66'	Report

Stadium of Sports Center of University Town of Shenzhen, Shenzhen
Referee: Lucila Venegas (Mexico)

2011-08-15
19:30

China	3–2	Great Britain
Zhao Rong 30'; Bi Yan 77'; Fan Tingting 86'	Report	Roberts 20'; Sweetman-Kirk 71'

Bao'an Stadium, Shenzhen
Referee: Ana Alves (Brazil)

=== Group B ===
Team	Pld	W	D	L	GF	GA	GD	Pts
South Korea	3	2	1	0	6	3	+3	7
Russia	3	1	1	1	3	1	+2	4
Mexico	3	0	3	0	5	5	0	3
South Africa	3	0	1	2	6	11	−5	1

2011-08-11
10:00

South Korea	4–2	South Africa
Jung Seol-Bin 34', 45+1'; Choi Yoo-Jung 83', 89'	Report	Dlamini 15', 36'

Stadium 1 of Shenzhen Sports School, Shenzhen
Referee: Qin Liang (China)

2011-08-11
10:00

Russia	0–0	Mexico
	Report

Stadium of Shenzhen Institute of Information Technology, Shenzhen
Referee: Ana Alves (Brazil)

2011-08-13
19:30

Mexico	1–1	South Korea
Monsivais Salayandia 82'	Report	Jung Seol-Bin 89'

Stadium of Sports Center of University Town of Shenzhen, Shenzhen
Referee: Qin Liang (China)

2011-08-13
19:30

South Africa	0–3	Russia
	Report	Gorbacheva 14'; Mashina 32', 44'

Athletic Field of Shenzhen University, Shenzhen
Referee: Sabine Bonnin (France)

2011-08-15
16:30

South Korea	1–0	Russia
Jung Seol-Bin 83'	Report

Stadium of Shenzhen Institute of Information Technology, Shenzhen
Referee: Mai Hoang Trang (Vietnam)

2011-08-15
16:30

Mexico	4–4	South Africa
Varela Ceballos 52', 85'; Monsivais Salayandia 59'; Corral Ang 69'	Report	Ntsweng 18'; Dlamini 34'; Mulaudzi 72'; Matlou 75'

Stadium 1 of Shenzhen Sports School, Shenzhen
Referee: Fusako Kajiyama (Japan)

=== Group C ===
Team	Pld	W	D	L	GF	GA	GD	Pts
Brazil	3	3	0	0	10	2	+8	9
Japan	3	2	0	1	6	3	+3	6
France	3	1	0	2	4	5	−1	3
Estonia	3	0	0	3	2	12	−10	0

2011-08-11
19:30

Japan	3–0	Estonia
Kishikawa 14'; Otaki 34', 81'	Report

Athletic Field of Shenzhen University, Shenzhen
Referee: Anastasia Pustovoytova (Russia)

2011-08-11
19:30

France	0–2	Brazil
	Report	Batista 13'; Guedes 80'

Bao'an Stadium, Shenzhen
Referee: Wang Jia (China)

2011-08-13
16:30

Brazil	3–1	Japan
Batista 22', 24'; Guedes 30'	Report	Sayama 4'

Bao'an Stadium, Shenzhen
Referee: Lucila Venegas (Mexico)

2011-08-13
16:30

Estonia	1–4	France
Žernosekova 79'	Report	Dali 35'; Tenret 38'; Thomas 51', 65'

Stadium of Sports Center of University Town of Shenzhen, Shenzhen
Referee: Lin Shiqin (China)

2011-08-15
19:30

Japan	2–0	France
Kubota 15'; Otaki 70'	Report

Shenzhen Stadium, Shenzhen
Referee: Wang Jia (China)

2011-08-15
19:30

Brazil	5–1	Estonia
Wiggers 12', 43'; Batista 57'; Oliveira 63'; Leandro 90+3'	Report	Vals 44'

Shenzhen Bao‘an Xixiang Sports Center, Shenzhen
Referee: Anastasia Pustovoytova (Russia)

== Classification 9th–12th Place ==
Team	Pld	W	D	L	GF	GA	GD	Pts
Great Britain	3	2	1	0	4	2	+2	7
Chinese Taipei	3	1	2	0	4	1	+3	5
South Africa	3	1	1	1	2	2	0	4
Estonia	3	0	0	3	0	5	−5	0

2011-08-17
16:30

Chinese Taipei	3–0	Estonia
Chen Ying-Hui 12', 38'; Tan Wen-lin 62'	Report

Stadium 1 of Shenzhen Sports School, Shenzhen
Referee: Lin Shiqin (China)

2011-08-17
16:30

Great Britain	2–1	South Africa
Pond 10'; Wardle 50'	Report	Mulaudzi 83'

Stadium of Sports Center of University Town of Shenzhen, Shenzhen
Referee: Anastasia Pustovoytova (Russia)

2011-08-19
16:30

Chinese Taipei	0–0	South Africa
	Report

Stadium 1 of Shenzhen Sports School, Shenzhen
Referee: Ana Alves (Brazil)

2011-08-19
16:30

Great Britain	1–0	Estonia
Danby 47'	Report

Stadium of Shenzhen Institute of Information Technology, Shenzhen
Referee: Fusako Kajiyama (Japan)

2011-08-21
16:30

Chinese Taipei	1–1	Great Britain
Lai LC 18'	Report	Greenwell 84'

Shenzhen Bao‘an Xixiang Sports Center, Shenzhen
Referee: Lucila Venegas (Mexico)

2011-08-21
16:30

South Africa	1–0	Estonia
Thato 90+5'	Report

Stadium 1 of Shenzhen Sports School, Shenzhen
Referee: Fusako Kajiyama (Japan)

== Knockout stage ==
Quarter-finals
17 August
China	4
Russia	1
17 August
Mexico	0 (1)
Brazil	0 (3)
17 August
Canada	0
Japan	6
17 August
France	2
South Korea	1

Semi-finals
19 August
China	1 (4)
Brazil	1 (3)
19 August
Japan	3
France	2

Final
21 August
China	2
Japan	1
Third place
21 August
Brazil	4
France	1

=== Quarterfinals ===
2011-08-17
16:30

China	4–1	Russia
Zhao Lili 24'; Wang Shanshan 69'; Bi Yan 88', 90+4'	Report	Kozhnikova 90'

Shenzhen Bao‘an Stadium, Shenzhen
Referee: Pannipar Kamnueng (Thailand)

2011-08-17
19:30

Mexico	0–0	Brazil
	Report
Penalties
Corral Ang (penalty missed); Gutierrez Perez (penalty scored); Salazar Carrillo (penalty missed); Miranda Rodriguez (penalty missed)	1–3	(penalty scored) Guedes; (penalty scored) Oliveira; (penalty missed) Batista; (penalty scored) Wiggers

Shenzhen Bao‘an Stadium, Shenzhen
Referee: Sabine Bonnin (France)

2011-08-17
19:30

Canada	0–6	Japan
	Report	Ikadai 23'; Otaki 37', 50', 78', 90+1'; Takeyama 82'

Stadium of Sports Center of University Town of Shenzhen, Shenzhen
Referee: Wang Jia (China)

2011-08-17
19:30

France	2–1	South Korea
Rubio 37'; Houara 44'	Report	Moon Mi-Ra 85'

Athletic Field of Shenzhen University, Shenzhen
Referee: Qin Liang (China)

=== Semifinals ===
2011-08-19
16:30

Japan	3–2	France
Kishikawa 17'; Takeyama 45+2'; Otaki 50'	Report	Palacin 54'; Chazal 85'

Shenzhen Bao‘an Stadium, Shenzhen
Referee: Lucila Venegas (Mexico)

2011-08-19
19:30

China	1–1	Brazil
Bi Yan 21'	Report	Batista 90+5'
Penalties
Bi Yan (penalty missed); Fan Tingting (penalty scored); Qu Shanshan (penalty scored); Li Wen (penalty scored); Pang Fengyue (penalty scored)	4–3	(penalty missed) Guedes; (penalty scored) D. Oliveira; (penalty scored) Batista; (penalty scored) Wiggersl; (penalty missed) G. Oliveira

Shenzhen Bao‘an Stadium, Shenzhen
Referee: Mai Hoang Trang (Vietnam)

=== Classification 5th–8th Place ===
Semi-finals
19 August
Russia	1
Mexico	0
19 August
Canada	3
South Korea	2

Final
21 August
Russia	0
Canada	1
Third place
21 August
Mexico	2
South Korea	3

2011-08-19
19:30

Russia	1–0	Mexico
Chichkala 15'	Report

Shenzhen Bao‘an Xixiang Sports Center, Shenzhen
Referee: Lin Shiqin (China)

2011-08-19
19:30

Canada	3–2	South Korea
Frazao 7'; Laverdière 41', 86'	Report	Jung Seol-Bin 10'; Kim Sang-Eun 50'

Athletic Field of Shenzhen University, Shenzhen
Referee: Sabine Bonnin (France)

== Finals ==
=== 7th-place match ===
2011-08-21
16:30

Mexico	2–3	South Korea
Monsivais Salayandia 7'; Valera Ceballos 77'	Report	Jung S 33', 64'; Moon M 86'

Stadium of Shenzhen Institute of Information Technology, Shenzhen
Referee: Wang Jia (China)

=== 5th-place match ===
2011-08-21
16:30

Russia	0–1	Canada
	Report	Baggott 52'

Athletic Field of Shenzhen University, Shenzhen
Referee: Qin Liang (China)

=== Bronze-medal match ===
2011-08-21
17:00

Brazil	4–1	France
D Oliveira 23'; Wiggers 67', 83', 89'	Report	Tenret 68'

Shenzhen Bao‘an Stadium, Shenzhen
Referee: Anastasia Pustovoytova (Russia)

=== Final ===
2011-08-21
21:00

China	2–1 (a.e.t.)	Japan
Pang Fengyue 58'; Fan Tingting 104'	Report	Nakade 33'

Shenzhen Bao‘an Stadium, Shenzhen
Referee: Pannipar Kamnueng (Thailand)

== Final standings ==
Place	Team
1st place, gold medalist(s)	China
2nd place, silver medalist(s)	Japan
3rd place, bronze medalist(s)	Brazil
4	France
5	Canada
6	Russia
7	South Korea
8	Mexico
9	Great Britain
10	Chinese Taipei
11	South Africa
12	Estonia
