= Football at the 2011 Summer Universiade – Men's tournament =

Men's football at the XXVI Summer Universiade
- Venue: Various
- Dates: August 11–22, 2011

The men's tournament of football at the 2011 Summer Universiade at China began on August 11 and ended on August 22. Japan won the gold medal.

== Teams ==
Africa	Americas	Asia	Europe
Ghana; South Africa	Brazil; Canada; Colombia; Uruguay	China; Japan; South Korea; Malaysia; Thailand	Czech Republic; Italy; Great Britain; Russia; Ukraine

== Preliminary round ==
=== Group A ===
Team	Pld	W	D	L	GF	GA	GD	Pts
South Korea	3	2	1	0	6	2	+4	7
China	3	1	2	0	4	1	+3	5
Namibia	3	1	1	1	6	4	+2	4
Colombia	3	0	0	3	2	11	−9	0

11 August 2011
19:30

China	1–1	Namibia
Fan Zhiqiang 20'	Report	Louis 5'

New Shenzhen Stadium, Shenzhen
Referee: Sergii Dankovskyi (Ukraine)

11 August 2011
21:45

South Korea	4–1	Colombia
Kim Byung-oh 25', 45'; Lee Myung-joo 77'; Park Hyung-jin 82'	Report	Ospina 64'

Bao'an Xixiang Sports Center, Shenzhen
Referee: Alexey Eskov (Russia)

14 August 2011
16:30

Namibia	1–2	South Korea
Nekundi 82'	Report	Cho Yung-hoon 24'; Shim Dong-woon 73'

Stadium of Shenzhen Sport School, Shenzhen
Referee: Eiko Saar (Estonia)

14 August 2011
19:30

Colombia	0–3	China
	Report	Lu Bin 31'; Fan Zhiqiang 68', 82'

New Shenzhen Stadium, Shenzhen
Referee: Yudai Yamamoto (Japan)

16 August 2011
19:30

Colombia	1–4	Namibia
Castro 53'	Report	Bantam 22'; Nekundi 39', 44'; Louis 61'

Stadium of Sports Center of Shenzhen University City, Shenzhen
Referee: Alexey Eskov (Russia)

16 August 2011
19:30

China	0–0	South Korea
	Report

New Shenzhen Stadium, Shenzhen
Referee: Andrea de Marco (Italy)

=== Group B ===
Team	Pld	W	D	L	GF	GA	GD	Pts
Russia	3	2	1	0	4	1	+3	7
Brazil	3	2	1	0	5	3	+2	7
Ukraine	3	1	0	2	3	4	−1	3
Malaysia	3	0	0	3	2	6	−4	0

11 August 2011
16:30

Ukraine	2–1	Malaysia
Gunchenko 53'; Kozak 89'	Report	Reuben 46'

New Shenzhen Stadium, Shenzhen
Referee: Robert Madden (Great Britain)

11 August 2011
19:30

Brazil	1–1	Russia
Berger 77'	Report	Ignatovich 33'

Stadium of Sports Center of Shenzhen University City, Shenzhen
Referee: Jumpei Iida (Japan)

14 August 2011
19:30

Malaysia	1–2	Brazil
Umar 88'	Report	Berger 20', 69'

Bao'an Xixiang Sports Center, Shenzhen
Referee: William Selorm Agbovi (Ghana)

14 August 2011
19:30

Russia	1–0	Ukraine
Budanov 38'	Report

Stadium of Sports Center of Shenzhen University City, Shenzhen
Referee: Silviu Ionel Petrescu (Canada)

16 August 2011
16:30

Russia	2–0	Malaysia
Pravilo 26'; Ryzhov 44'	Report

Stadium of Shenzhen Sport School, Shenzhen
Referee: Lwandile Mfiki (South Africa)

16 August 2011
16:30

Ukraine	1–2	Brazil
Leonov 16'	Report	Berger 48', 84'

New Shenzhen Stadium, Shenzhen
Referee: Wand Di (China)

=== Group C ===
Team	Pld	W	D	L	GF	GA	GD	Pts
Italy	3	2	1	0	5	2	+3	7
Uruguay	3	1	2	0	7	6	+1	5
Thailand	3	0	2	1	2	4	−2	2
Czech Republic	3	0	1	2	2	4	−2	1

11 August 2011
16:30

Italy	2–0	Thailand
Iadaresta 7', 38'	Report

Stadium of Sports Center of Shenzhen University City, Shenzhen
Referee: Wang Di (China)

11 August 2011
19:30

Czech Republic	2–3	Uruguay
Frnoch 55'; Smutny 83'	Report	Inciarte 9', 24'; Vidal 20'

Bao'an Xixiang Sports Center, Shenzhen
Referee: Ng Kai Lam (Hong Kong)

14 August 2011
16:30

Thailand	0–0	Czech Republic
	Report

Gymnasium of Shenzhen Institute of Information Technology, Shenzhen
Referee: Raymond John Crangle (Great Britain)

14 August 2011
16:30

Uruguay	2–2	Italy
Papa 7'; Salvadori 90+2' (o.g.)	Report	Moxedano 79'; Demma 87'

New Shenzhen Stadium, Shenzhen
Referee: Rainhold Shikongo (Namibia)

16 August 2011
16:30

Uruguay	2–2	Thailand
Finocchietti 2'; Lambach 70'	Report	Namwiset 19'; Ramkularbsuk 34'

Gymnasium of Shenzhen Institute of Information Technology, Shenzhen
Referee: Mat Karim Mohd Yussof (Malaysia)

16 August 2011
16:30

Italy	1–0	Czech Republic
Lorenzini 86'	Report

Shenzhen University Athletic Field, Shenzhen
Referee: Tong Kui Sum (Hong Kong)

=== Group D ===
Team	Pld	W	D	L	GF	GA	GD	Pts
Japan	3	2	1	0	9	3	+6	7
Great Britain	3	2	0	1	3	2	+1	6
Ghana	3	0	2	1	3	4	−1	2
Canada	3	0	0	3	3	9	−6	1

11 August 2011
16:30

Japan	2–2	Ghana
Musaka 27'; Yamamura 38'	Report	Tetteh 45'; Bukari 90'

Gymnasium of Shenzhen Institute of Information Technology, Shenzhen
Referee: Andrea de Marco (Italy)

11 August 2011
16:30

Great Britain (United Kingdom)	2–1	Canada
Warren 21'; Anderson 66'	Report	Pena 53'

Stadium of Shenzhen Sport School, Shenzhen
Referee: Sakda Pansuk (Thailand)

14 August 2011
16:30

Ghana	0–1	Great Britain
	Report	Moses 76'

Bao'an Xixiang Sports Center, Shenzhen
Referee: Zhao Liang (China)

14 August 2011
19:30

Canada	1–6	Japan
Taniguchi 38' (o.g)	Report	Shiina 6'; Miyasaka 13'; Senuma 21'; Tomiyama 31', 34'; Yuzawa 48'

University Athletic Field, Shenzhen
Referee: Kao Jung-fang (Chinese Taipei)

16 August 2011
19:30

Canada	1–1	Ghana
Haworth 40'	Report	Abban 52'

Bao'an Xixiang Sports Center, Shenzhen
Referee: Miroslav Zelinka (Czech Republic)

16 August 2011
19:30

Japan	1–0	Great Britain
Akasaki 73'	Report

University Athletic Field, Shenzhen
Referee: Sergei Dankovskyi (Ukraine)

== Quarterfinal round ==
=== Classification 9th–16th place ===
Quarter-finals
18 August
Namibia	3 (3)
Canada	3 (5)
18 August
Thailand	1 (3)
Malaysia	1 (4)
18 August
Ukraine	0
Czech Republic	1
18 August
Ghana	1
Colombia	2

Semi-finals
20 August
Canada	5
Malaysia	1
20 August
Czech Republic	1 (4)
Colombia	1 (5)

Final
22 August
Canada	1
Colombia	0
Third place
22 August
Malaysia	0
Czech Republic	5

18 August 2011
16:30

Namibia	3–3	Canada
Tjiuoro 27'; Louis 76'; Bantam 86'	Report	Murphy 12'; Pena 40'; Haworth 67'
Penalties
Katali (penalty scored); Louis (penalty scored); Katirey (penalty missed); Bantam (penalty scored)	3–5	(penalty scored) Haworth; (penalty scored) Kodejs; (penalty scored) Di Biase; (penalty scored) Orlov; (penalty scored) Barangida Hamilton

Shenzhen University Athletic Field, Shenzhen
Referee: Eiko Saar (Estonia)

18 August 2011
16:30

Ghana	1–2	Colombia
Tetteh 71'	Report	Vanegas 22'; Movncada 90+4'

Gymnasium of Shenzhen Institute of Information Technology, Shenzhen
Referee: Raymond Crangle (Great Britain)

18 August 2011
16:30

Ukraine	0–1	Czech Republic
	Report	Blažej 69'

Bao'an Xixiang Sports Center, Shenzhen
Referee: William Selorm Agbovi (Ghana)

18 August 2011
16:30

Thailand	1–1	Malaysia
Seaisakul 30'	Report	Reuben 75'
Penalties
Namwiset (penalty scored); Kunraksa (penalty scored); Sayriya (penalty missed); Daengsee (penalty missed); Vongviboon (penalty scored)	3–4	(penalty missed) Zulkipeli; (penalty scored) Umar; (penalty scored) Rahman; (penalty scored) Mohd Ali; (penalty scored) Ibrahim

Stadium of Shenzhen Sport School, Shenzhen
Referee: Kao Jung-fang (Chinese Taipei)

=== Quarterfinals ===
Quarter-finals
18 August
Japan	3
China	2
18 August
Russia	0 (5)
Uruguay	0 (4)
18 August
Italy	0
Brazil	1
18 August
South Korea	0
Great Britain	1

Semi-finals
20 August
Japan	4
Russia	1
20 August
Brazil	0 (3)
Great Britain	0 (4)

Final
22 August
Japan	2
Great Britain	0
Third place
22 August
Russia	0
Brazil	2

18 August 2011
19:30

Japan	3–2	China
Senuma 2'; Kawamoto 57', 79'	Report	Fan Zhiqiang 22'; Yang Yang 24'

Shenzhen Bao‘an Stadium, Shenzhen
Referee: Silviu Ionel Petrescu (Canada)

18 August 2011
19:30

South Korea	0–1	Great Britain
	Report	Moses 64'

New Shenzhen Stadium, Shenzhen
Referee: Rainhold Shikongo (Namibia)

18 August 2011
19:30

Italy	0–1	Brazil
	Report	Berger 87'

Bao'an Xixiang Sports Center, Shenzhen
Referee: Jumpei Lida (Japan)

18 August 2011
16:30

Russia	0–0	Uruguay
	Report
Penalties
Kozhevnikov (penalty scored); Pesegov (penalty scored); Nikitinsky (penalty scored); Drukovskiy (penalty scored); Mamedov (penalty scored)	5–4	(penalty scored) Vidal; (penalty scored) Carlevaro; (penalty scored) Turnes; (penalty missed) Álvarez; (penalty scored) Guerrero

New Shenzhen Stadium, Shenzhen
Referee: Zhao Liang (China)

== Semifinal round ==
=== Classification 13th–16th place ===
20 August 2011
16:30

Namibia	0–1	Thailand
	Report	Uanivi 7' (o.g.)

Shenzhen University Athletic Field, Shenzhen
Referee: Lwandile Mfiki (South Africa)

20 August 2011
19:30

Ukraine	2–1	Ghana

Bao'an Xixiang Sports Center, Shenzhen

=== Classification 9th–12th place ===
20 August 2011
16:30

Canada	5–1	Malaysia
Dosanjh 10'; Smith 45+3'; Antonini 50'; Barandica Hamilton 73'; Northey 90+3'	Report	Kamaruddin 57'

Stadium of Shenzhen Sport School, Shenzhen
Referee: Sergii Dankovskyi (Ukraine)

20 August 2011
19:30

Czech Republic	1–1	Colombia
Nevidal 15'	Report	Ospina 45'
Penalties
Rein (penalty missed); Krejčí (penalty scored); Buchta (penalty scored); Blažej (penalty scored); Nevidal (penalty scored)	4–5	(penalty scored) Marín; (penalty scored) Ramírez; (penalty scored) Castro; (penalty scored) Vanegas; (penalty scored) Salazar

Shenzhen University Athletic Field, Shenzhen
Referee: Sakda Pansud (Thailand)

=== Classification 5th–8th place ===
20 August 2011
16:30

China	0–0	Uruguay
	Report
Penalties
Li Xun (penalty scored); Zhuang Dayu (penalty scored); Han Guanghui (penalty scored); Yang Yang (penalty scored); Lu Bin (penalty scored); Wang Chao (penalty scored); Wu Fanghu (penalty scored); Fan Zhiqiang (penalty missed)	7–8	(penalty scored) Turnes; (penalty scored) Bacetti; (penalty scored) Carlevaro; (penalty scored) Fernández; (penalty scored) Guerrero; (penalty scored) Suárez; (penalty scored) Papa; (penalty scored) Pochintesta

Gymnasium of Shenzhen Institute of Information Technology, Shenzhen
Referee: Alexey Eskov (Russia)

20 August 2011
16:30

Italy	0–1	South Korea
	Report	Kim Byung-oh 55'

Bao'an Xixiang Sports Center, Shenzhen
Referee: Robert Adam Madden (Great Britain)

=== Semifinals ===
20 August 2011
19:30

Japan	4–1	Russia
Musaka 57'; Kawamoto 77'; Maruyama 84', 90+2'	Report	Bocharov 66'

New Shenzhen Stadium, Shenzhen
Referee: Andrea De Marco (Italy)

20 August 2011
16:30

Brazil	0–0	Great Britain
	Report
Penalties
Sales Junior (penalty missed); Berger (penalty missed); Carvalho (penalty scored); Aniceto (penalty scored); Florencio (penalty scored)	3–4	(penalty scored) Macaulay; (penalty scored) Andreson; (penalty scored) Warren; (penalty missed) Winter; (penalty scored) Moses

New Shenzhen Stadium, Shenzhen
Referee: Miroslav Zelinka (Czech Republic)

== Final round ==
=== 15th-place match ===
22 August 2011
16:30

Namibia	0–2	Ghana
	Report	Bukari 23'; Abban 45+1'

Stadium of Sports Center of Shenzhen University City, Shenzhen
Referee: Tong Kui Sum (Hong Kong)

=== 13th-place match ===
22 August 2011
16:30

Thailand	1–1	Ukraine
Masuk 90+1'	Report	Malyi 90+2'
Penalties
Namwiset (penalty scored); Kulabkhaw (penalty scored); Ruangsuksut (penalty scored); Manjitt (penalty scored); Seaisakul (penalty scored); Kunraksa (penalty scored)	6–5	(penalty scored) Pronevych; (penalty scored) Leonov; (penalty scored) Kozak; (penalty scored) Kushka; (penalty scored) Grebynskyy; (penalty missed) Varchenko

Shenzhen University Athletic Field, Shenzhen
Referee: Ng Kai Lam (Hong Kong)

=== 11th-place match ===
22 August 2011
16:30

Malaysia	0–5	Czech Republic
	Report	Rendla 21'; Schubert 43'; Volek 49', 90+2'; Schön 84'

Bao'an Xixiang Sports Center, Shenzhen
Referee: Raymond John Crangle (Great Britain)

=== 9th-place match ===
22 August 2011
16:30

Canada	1–0	Colombia
Pena 87'	Report

Stadium of Shenzhen Sport School, Shenzhen
Referee: Jumpei Lida (Japan)

=== 7th-place match ===
22 August 2011
16:30

Italy	0–1	China
	Report	Han Guanghui 35'

Gymnasium of Shenzhen Institute of Information Technology, Shenzhen
Referee: Miroslav Zelinka (Czech Republic)

=== 5th-place match ===
22 August 2011
16:30

South Korea	0–0	Uruguay
	Report
Penalties
Kim Byung-oh (penalty missed); Park Hyung-jin (penalty scored); Cho Yung-hoon (penalty scored); Lee Taig-ki (penalty scored)	3–0	(penalty missed) Vidal; (penalty missed) Bacetti; (penalty missed) Inciarte

Shenzhen Bao‘an Stadium, Shenzhen
Referee: Robert Adam Madden (Great Britain)

=== Bronze-medal match ===
22 August 2011
17:00

Russia	0–2	Brazil
	Report	Florencio 52'; Berger 67'

New Shenzhen Stadium, Shenzhen
Referee: Silviu Ionel Petrescu (Canada)

=== Gold-medal match ===
22 August 2011
21:00

Japan	2–0	Great Britain
Kawamoto 29'; Yamamura 58'	Report

New Shenzhen Stadium, Shenzhen
Referee: Zhao Liang (China)

== Final standings ==
Place	Team
1st place, gold medalist(s)	Japan
2nd place, silver medalist(s)	Great Britain
3rd place, bronze medalist(s)	Brazil
4	Russia
5	South Korea
6	Uruguay
7	China
8	Italy
9	Canada
10	Colombia
11	Czech Republic
12	Malaysia
13	Thailand
14	Ukraine
15	Ghana
16	Namibia
