= 2007 AFC U-19 Women's Championship =

AFC U-19 Women's Championship

Tournament details
- Host country: China
- Dates: 5–16 October
- Teams: 8 (from 1 confederation)
- Venue: 1 (in 1 host city)

Final positions
- Champions: North Korea (2nd title)
- Runners-up: Japan
- Third place: China
- Fourth place: South Korea

Tournament statistics
- Matches played: 16
- Goals scored: 50 (3.13 per match)

The Asian Football Confederations AFC U-19 Women's Championship 2007 was the 4th edition of the AFC U-19 Women's Championship. It was held from 5 to 16 October 2007 at Chongqing in China.

North Korea defeated Japan 1–0 in the final to become champions.

== Qualification ==
=== Qualified teams ===
- China: Defending champions
- North Korea: 2006 runners-up
- Australia: 2006 3rd place
- Japan: 2006 4th place
- South Korea: 2006 5th place
- Thailand: Group A winner
- Chinese Taipei: Group B winner
- Myanmar: Group A runner-up

== Venues ==
Chongqing
Chongqing Olympic Sports Center	Datianwan Stadium
Capacity: 58,680	Capacity: 32,000
2007 AFC U-19 Women's Championship is located in China

== Seeding ==
1. China
2. North Korea
3. Australia
4. Japan
5. South Korea
6. Chinese Taipei
7. Thailand
8. Myanmar

== Group stage ==
- All times are China Standard Time

=== Group A ===
Team	Pld	W	D	L	GF	GA	GD	Pts
North Korea	3	3	0	0	8	2	+6	9
Japan	3	2	0	1	10	3	+7	6
Australia	3	1	0	2	3	4	−1	3
Myanmar	3	0	0	3	1	13	−12	0

Source: table
October 6, 2007
16:00

North Korea	3–0	Myanmar
Ra Un-sim 44'; Ri Un-hyang 50' (pen.); Cha Hu-nam 65'

Chongqing Olympic Sports Centre
Attendance: 500
Referee: Praew Semaksuk (Thailand)

October 6, 2007
18:15

Japan	1–0	Australia
Kira 21'	Report

Chongqing Olympic Sports Centre
Attendance: 300
Referee: Pannipar Kamueng (Thailand

October 8, 2007
16:00

Myanmar	0–8	Japan
		Ataeyama 11'; Nakade 37', 44', 73'; Tanaka 48'; Yamazaki 50', 67', 77'

Chongqing Olympic Sports Centre
Attendance: 100
Referee: Kim Mi-ok (Korea Republic)

October 8, 2007
18:15

Australia	1–2	North Korea
Butt 13' (pen.)	Report	Cha Hu-nam 41'; Ra Un-sim 83' (pen.)

Chongqing Olympic Sports Centre
Attendance: 1,000
Referee: Wang Jia (China)

October 10, 2007
16:00

North Korea	3–1	Japan
Cha Hu-nam 26'; Ra Un-sim 62'; Ri Jong-sim 70'		Ataeyama 16'

Chongqing Olympic Sports Centre
Attendance: 500
Referee: Pannipar Kamueng (Thailand)

October 10, 2007
16:00

Australia	2–1	Myanmar
Connor 33'; Simon 53'	Report	Mu Mu Lwin 32'

Datianwan Stadium
Attendance: 150
Referee: Praew Semaksuk (Thailand)

=== Group B ===
Team	Pld	W	D	L	GF	GA	GD	Pts
South Korea	3	2	1	0	10	2	+8	7
China	3	2	1	0	8	1	+7	7
Thailand	3	1	0	2	3	5	−2	3
Chinese Taipei	3	0	0	3	0	13	−13	0

Source: table
October 5, 2007
16:00

South Korea	6–0	Chinese Taipei
Lo Huei-Tzu 2' (o.g.); Kwon Hah-nul 17'; Yoo Young-a 44'; Jung Hae-in 52', 73'; Park Youn-jeong 63'

Chongqing Olympic Sports Centre
Attendance: 500
Referee: Bentla D'Coth (India)

October 5, 2007
18:15

China	2–0	Thailand
Peangthem 76' (o.g.); Zhu Wei 88'

Chongqing Olympic Sports Centre
Attendance: 7,000
Referee: Etsuko Fukano (Japan)

October 7, 2007
16:00

Thailand	1–3	South Korea
Srangthaisong 19'		Yoo Young-a 29', 90'; Jung Hae-in 76'

Chongqing Olympic Sports Centre
Attendance: 1,000
Referee: Melksham (Australia)

October 7, 2007
18:15

Chinese Taipei	0–5	China
		Liu Shukun 13'; Li Wen 24'; Ma Zixiang 28', 66'; Zhu Wei 63'

Chongqing Olympic Sports Centre
Attendance: 1,000
Referee: Ri Hyang-ok (Korea DPR)

October 9, 2007
16:00

Thailand	2–0	Chinese Taipei
Romyen 8'; Chawong 60'

Chongqing Olympic Sports Centre
Attendance: 100
Referee: Etsuko Fukano (Japan)

October 9, 2007
16:00

China	1–1	South Korea
Ma Xiaoxu 41'		Jung Hae-in 80'

Datianwan Stadium
Attendance: 1,000
Referee: Bentla D'Coth (India)

== Knockout stages ==
- All times are China Standard Time

=== Semi-finals ===
October 13, 2007
16:00

South Korea	0–0	Japan
Penalties
	5–6

Chongqing Olympic Sports Centre
Attendance: 600
Referee: Melksham (Australia)

October 13, 2007
19:00

North Korea	4–1	China
Ryom Su-ok 6'; Hwang Song-mi 36'; Ri Ye-gyong 47', 86'		Ruan Xiaoqing 76'

Chongqing Olympic Sports Centre
Attendance: 1,000
Referee: Pannipar Kamueng (Thailand)

=== 3rd-place match ===
October 16, 2007
16:00

South Korea	0–1	China
	Report	Ruan Xiaoqing 77'

Chongqing Olympic Sports Centre
Attendance: 7,000
Referee: Bentla D'Coth (India)

=== Final ===
October 16, 2007
19:00

North Korea	1–0	Japan
Ra Un-sim 22'	Report

Chongqing Olympic Sports Centre
Attendance: 5,000
Referee: Praew Semaksuk (Thailand)

== Countries to participate in 2008 FIFA U-20 Women's World Cup ==
- North Korea
- Japan
- China

== Goalscorers ==
There were 50 goals scored in 16 matches, for an average of 3.12 goals per match.

4 goals

- (North Korea) Ra Un-sim

3 goals

- (Japan) Hikari Nakade
- (Japan) Marumi Yamazaki
- (South Korea) Jung Hae-in
- (North Korea) Cha Hu-nam

2 goals

- (China) Ruan Xiaoqing
- (China) Ma Zixiang
- (China) Zhu Wei
- (Japan) Konomi Ataeyama
- (North Korea) Ri Ye-gyong

1 goal

- (Australia) Tameka Butt
- (Australia) Ashleigh Connor
- (Australia) Kyah Simon
- (China) Li Wen
- (China) Liu Shukun
- (Japan) Chinatsu Kira
- (Japan) Asuna Tanaka
- (South Korea) Kwon Hah-nul
- (South Korea) Park Youn-jeong
- (South Korea) Yoo Young-a
- (Myanmar) Mu Mu Lwin
- (North Korea) Ri Un-hyang
- (North Korea) Ri Jong-sim
- (North Korea) Ryom Su-ok
- (North Korea) Hwang Song-mi
- (Thailand) Sunisa Srangthaisong
- (Thailand) Nisa Romyen
- (Thailand) Chidtawan Chawong

1 own goal

- (Chinese Taipei) Lo Huei-tzu (against South Korea)
- (Thailand) Sukunya Peangthem (against China)
