= Nakade =

Nakade (中出) is a Japanese surname. People with this surname include:

- Sanya Nakade (1897–1971), Japanese painter
- Hikari Nakade (born 1988), Japanese football player
- Hitsujiko Nakade (born 1991), Hong Kong political activist involved in the 2016 Hong Kong Legislative Council candidates' disqualification controversy
