= Danny Sleath =

English association football player

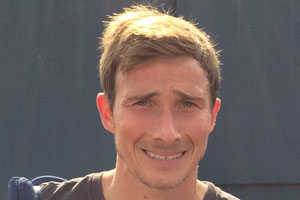

Personal information
- Full name: Daniel James Sleath
- Date of birth: 14 December 1986 (age 39)
- Place of birth: Matlock, England
- Height: 5 ft 8 in (1.73 m)
- Position: Midfielder

Senior career*
| Years | Team | Apps | (Gls) |
| 2006–2008 | Mansfield Town | 14 | (0) |
| 2006 | → Gresley Rovers (loan) | | |
| 2007 | → Alfreton Town (loan) | | |
| 2007 | → Boston United (loan) | | |
| 2008 | → Gainsborough Trinity (loan) | | |
| 2008 | Eastwood Town | | |
| 2008–2009 | Ilkeston Town | | |
| 2009–2012 | Boston United | | |
| 2012–2014 | Nuneaton Town | 70 | (2) |
| 2014–2015 | Tamworth | 6 | (0) |
Medal record
Representing Great Britain
World University Games
| Silver medal – second place | 2011 Shenzhen | Men's Team |
- * Club domestic league appearances and goals as of 13:49, 31 August 2014 (UTC)

Danny Sleath (born 14 December 1986, in Matlock) is an English footballer who most recently played for Conference North side Tamworth, where he played as a midfielder.

== Playing career ==
=== Mansfield Town ===
Born in Matlock, Derbyshire, Sleath is a graduate of the Mansfield Town youth academy and signed his first professional contract in the summer of 2006. During the 2006–07 season, Sleath was loaned out to Northern Premier League side Gresley Rovers, and later Conference North side Alfreton Town, to get first-team experience. After being recalled to his parent club, he made his first-team debut for Mansfield against Boston in March 2007, and was offered a new contract in May 2007. He joined Boston United on loan in November 2007, and then Gainsborough Trinity on loan in March 2008 until the end of the 2007–08 season. He was released by Mansfield at the end of the 2007–08 season.

=== Eastwood Town ===
After his release by Mansfield, he decided to pursue a career outside full-time professional football and enrolled at Loughborough University. He played for Northern Premier League Premier Division club Eastwood Town in September 2008.

=== Ilkeston Town ===
He spent the second half of the season with Ilkeston Town helping the club earn promotion.

=== Boston United ===
In July 2009, Sleath signed for Boston United, and helped them to their best run of results for 23 years during the 2009–10 season, as Boston won the Northern Premier League Challenge Cup and promotion. He also played in the final of the 2011 Summer Universiade for Great Britain during his time with Boston United.

=== Nuneaton Town ===
In June 2012 he joined Nuneaton Town.

=== Tamworth ===
On 9 June 2014 Sleath signed a contract with Conference North side Tamworth, and was joined at the club on the same day by former Nuneaton Town colleagues Kevin Thornton and David Hibbert.

== Career statistics ==
As of match played 22 May 2014.

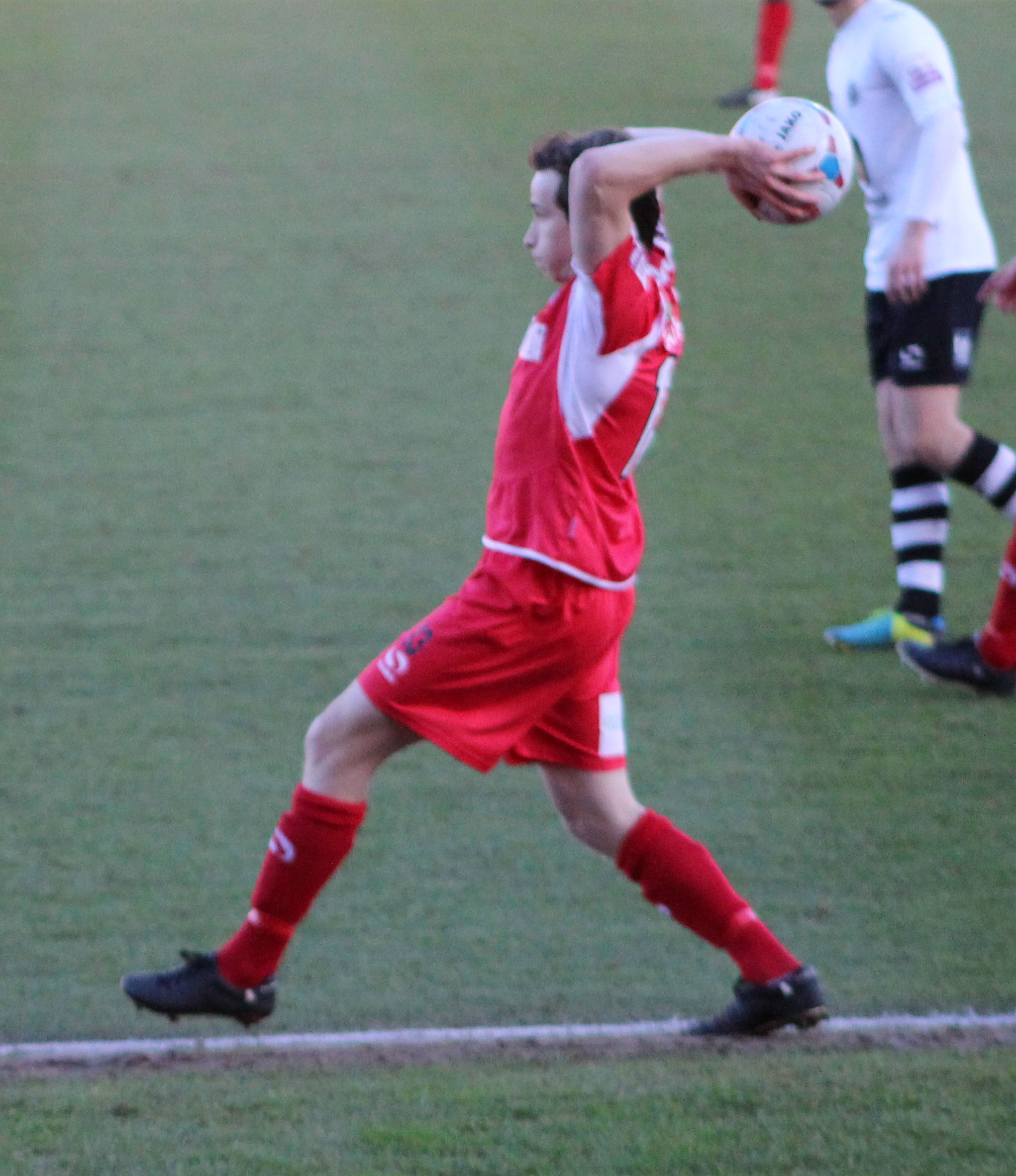
Sleath with Nuneaton Town.

| Club | Season | League | | | FA Cup | | League Cup | | Other (Note: Includes other competitive competitions, including the FA Trophy) | | Total | |
| Club | Season | Division | Apps | Goals | Apps | Goals | Apps | Goals | Apps | Goals | Apps | Goals |
|---|---|---|---|---|---|---|---|---|---|---|---|---|
| Mansfield Town | 2006–07 | League Two | 7 | 0 | 0 | 0 | 0 | 0 | 0 | 0 | 7 | 0 |
| Mansfield Town | 2007–08 | League Two | 7 | 0 | 1 | 0 | 0 | 0 | 1 | 0 | 9 | 0 |
| Mansfield Town | Mansfield Town total | | 14 | 0 | 0 | 0 | 0 | 0 | 1 | 0 | 16 | 0 |
| Eastwood Town | 2008–09 | Northern Premier Division | 0 | 0 | 0 | 0 | – | | 0 | 0 | 0 | 0 |
| Ilkeston Town | 2008–09 | Northern Premier Division | 0 | 0 | 0 | 0 | – | | 0 | 0 | 0 | 0 |
| Boston United | 2009–10 | Northern Premier Division | 0 | 0 | 0 | 0 | – | | 0 | 0 | 0 | 0 |
| Boston United | 2010–11 | Conference North | 0 | 0 | 0 | 0 | – | | 0 | 0 | 0 | 0 |
| Boston United | 2011–12 | Conference North | 0 | 0 | 0 | 0 | – | | 0 | 0 | 0 | 0 |
| Boston United | Boston United total | | 0 | 0 | 0 | 0 | – | | 0 | 0 | 0 | 0 |
| Nuneaton Town | 2012–13 | Conference National | 29 | 1 | 2 | 0 | – | | 0 | 0 | 31 | 1 |
| Nuneaton Town | 2013–14 | Conference National | 41 | 1 | 0 | 0 | – | | 0 | 0 | 41 | 1 |
| Nuneaton Town | Nuneaton Town total | | 70 | 2 | 2 | 0 | – | | 0 | 0 | 72 | 2 |
| Tamworth | 2014–15 | Conference North | 0 | 0 | 0 | 0 | – | | 0 | 0 | 0 | 0 |
| Career totals | | | 0 | 0 | 0 | 0 | 0 | 0 | 0 | 0 | 0 | 0 |
