= Danny Alcock =

English footballer

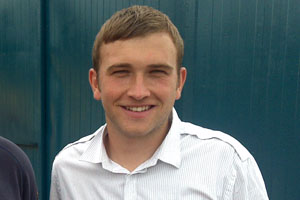
- Alcock in 2009

Personal information
- Full name: Daniel James Alcock
- Date of birth: 15 February 1984 (age 42)
- Place of birth: Newcastle-under-Lyme, England
- Height: 5 ft 11 in (1.80 m)
- Position: Goalkeeper

Team information
- Current team: Wolverhampton Wanderers F.C. (Goalkeeper Coach)

Youth career
- 2000–2001: Stoke City

Senior career*
Years	Team	Apps	(Gls)
2001–2003	Stoke City	0	(0)
2003	Stone Dominoes		
2003	Kidsgrove Athletic		
2003–2004	Barnsley	1	(0)
2004–2006	Accrington Stanley	6	(0)
2006–2008	Stafford Rangers	78	(0)
2008–2010	Tamworth	41	(0)
2010–2012	Nuneaton Town	0	(0)
Total		126	(0)

International career
2007	England C	1	(0)
2011	Team GBR	4	(0)
Medal record
Representing Great Britain
World University Games
Silver medal – second place	2011 Shenzhen	Men's Team
- * Club domestic league appearances and goals

Daniel James Alcock (born 15 February 1984) is an English former professional footballer who played as a goalkeeper, and is the current goalkeeping coach at club Premier League Wolverhampton Wanderers F.C.

== Club career ==
=== Early career ===
Alcock was born in Newcastle-under-Lyme, Staffordshire, and joined Stoke City as a trainee from school. He turned professional in August 2001, but was released in May 2003 without making his first team debut for Stoke, signing for local side Stone Dominoes and subsequently moving on to Kidsgrove Athletic.

=== Barnsley ===
He joined Barnsley in August 2003. He was understudy to first Saša Ilić and then Marlon Beresford, but finally made his league debut on 12 April 2004 in a 3–3 draw at home to Queens Park Rangers, replacing the injured Beresford midway through the first half. That was his only first team appearance for Barnsley and he was released at the end of the season.

=== Accrington Stanley ===
He joined Accrington Stanley in July 2004, playing five times in the Conference the following season. In the 2005–06 season, Accrington won the title and promotion to the Football League, but Alcock played just once, in the 2–0 defeat away to Kidderminster Harriers on the final day of the season as Stanley rested regular keeper Robert Elliot. He would have played more often, in particular when a broken arm in a reserve game prevented him from replacing the injured and soon to retire Stuart Jones. He was released soon after that game

=== Stafford Rangers ===
Alcock joined Stafford Rangers in August 2006, quickly establishing himself as Rangers' regular goalkeeper the following season. At the end of the 2007–08 season, Alcock won the fans player of the season, managers player of the season and the players' player of the season awards for his great goalkeeping, despite conceding almost 100 goals that year. Alcock stayed as the first choice goalkeeper in 2008–09, fighting off tough competition from new goalkeeper Tim Sandercombe.

=== Tamworth ===
On 18 December 2008, Alcock made the short journey to local side, Tamworth.

It was confirmed by manager Gary Mills on 15 July 2010 that Alcock would not be returning to The Lambs for the 2010–11 season.

=== Nuneaton Town ===
Alcock signed for Nuneaton Town on 5 August 2010 following a successful trial period.

== Coaching career ==
Alcock worked as a goalkeeping coach on a part-time basis at the Stoke City Academy from 2010 to 2018. He then worked as the goalkeeping coach of the England U20s.

On 24 September 2021, Alcock was appointed as first team goalkeeper coach and head of goalkeeping for Championship club Nottingham Forest under new head coach Steve Cooper.

== International career ==
Alcock played for the England C team in their match against Northern Ireland in 2007. Alcock was selected for the Team GBR squad that won the silver medal at the 2011 Summer Universiade.

== Personal life ==
Alcock's younger brother Adam is also a goalkeeper in non-league football. Their father is Barry Alcock, the former Stafford Rangers goalkeeper in the 1980s.

== Career statistics ==
Club	Season	League			FA Cup		League Cup		Other		Total	
Club	Season	Division	Apps	Goals	Apps	Goals	Apps	Goals	Apps	Goals	Apps	Goals
Barnsley	2003–04	Second Division	1	0	0	0	0	0	0	0	1	0
Accrington Stanley	2004–05	Football Conference	5	0	0	0	0	0	0	0	5	0
Accrington Stanley	2005–06	Football Conference	1	0	0	0	0	0	0	0	1	0
Stafford Rangers	2006–07	Football Conference	24	0	3	0	0	0	0	0	27	0
Stafford Rangers	2007–08	Football Conference	32	0	0	0	0	0	0	0	32	0
Stafford Rangers	2008–09	Conference North	22	0	0	0	0	0	0	0	22	0
Tamworth	2009–10	Football Conference	41	0	0	0	0	0	0	0	41	0
Career total			126	0	3	0	0	0	0	0	129	0

== Honours ==
Individual

- Tamworth Player of the Year: 2009–10
