= Wang Fei (footballer, born 1990) =

Chinese footballer

Wang Fei 王飞
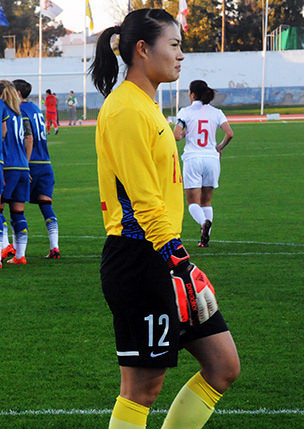
- Wang in 2015

Personal information
- Full name: Wang Fei
- Date of birth: 22 March 1990 (age 36)
- Place of birth: Dalian, Liaoning, China
- Height: 1.79 m (5 ft 10 in)
- Position: Goalkeeper

Senior career*
Years	Team	Apps	(Gls)
2010–2011	Dalian Shide		
2012–2013	Liaoning Ladies		
2014	Dalian Aerbin		
2015	Turbine Potsdam	9	(0)
2015	Olympique Lyonnais	2	(0)
2016–2017	Dalian Quanjian	0	(0)
2018	Bayern Munich	0	(0)
2018	IF Limhamn Bunkeflo	0	(0)
2018	IF Limhamn Bunkeflo	0	(0)
2019	Guangdong Huijun	0	(0)
2021	Tianjin Shengde	10	(0)
2022-2023	Wuhan Jianghan University	9	(0)

International career^{‡}
2012–2015	China	63	(0)
- * Club domestic league appearances and goals as of 22 November 2015 ‡ National team caps and goals as of 18 February 2018

Wang Fei (simplified Chinese: 王飞; traditional Chinese: 王飛; pinyin: Wáng Fēi; born 22 March 1990) is a Chinese former footballer who played as a goalkeeper.

== Club career ==
After spending years playing for several Chinese clubs, Wang Fei signed for Frauen-Bundesliga side Turbine Potsdam in December 2014. She became the first ever Chinese footballer to play in the Frauen-Bundesliga. Turbine's veteran manager Bernd Schröder praised the impact made by Wang and compared her to respected German goalkeeper Nadine Angerer; however, Schröder surprisingly selected departing goalkeeper Anna Felicitas Sarholz ahead of Wang for the 2015 DFB-Pokal final which ended in a 3–0 loss against VfL Wolfsburg.

In September 2015, Wang transferred to Division 1 Féminine champions Lyon. In January 2016, she terminated her contract with the club; however, the club demanded for her return when Méline Gérard was injured.

On 17 January 2016, Wang transferred to Chinese Women's Super League side Dalian Quanjian. In December 2017 Bayern Munich announced that Wang had agreed an 18-month contract with the Bavarian club, to commence 1 January 2018.

== International career ==
Wang played at the 2011 Summer Universiade and was the regular for China's gold medal-winning run. She made her debut for the Chinese women's national team on 24 November 2012 in a 2–1 win against Australia at the 2013 EAFF Women's East Asian Cup.

Wang was also included in China's squad for the 2015 FIFA Women's World Cup. During the tournament, Wang was described by FIFA as tall, agile and one of China's "most impressive performers" in the team's progress to the knockout stages. This was despite her playing through the pain of an injured shoulder which was sustained on 11 June 2015 in a 1–0 win against the Netherlands.

In February 2016, Wang retired from China after getting into several confrontations with manager Bruno Bini and not being called up to the national team as a result. In February 2018, she was included in China's squad for the 2018 Algarve Cup.

== Honours ==
Wang Fei Interviewed by the International University Sports Federation.

Dalian Quanjian

- Chinese Women's Super League: 2016

China PR

- Summer Universiade: 2011
- Four Nations Tournament: 2014, 2016
