= Ryoya Tachibana =

Japanese footballer

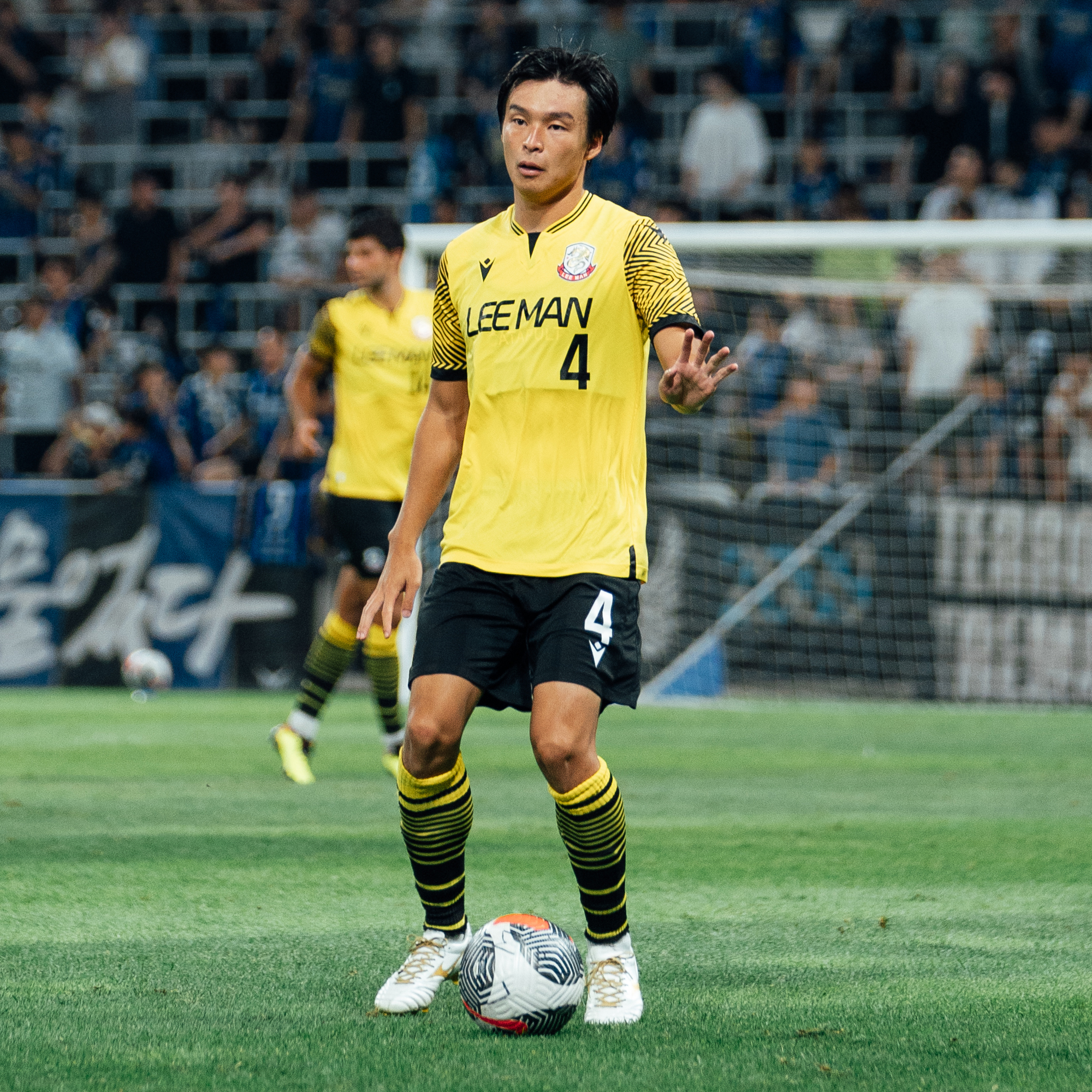

Personal information
- Full name: Ryoya Tachibana
- Date of birth: 4 April 1996 (age 30)
- Place of birth: Osaka, Japan
- Height: 1.78 m (5 ft 10 in)
- Position: Left-back

Team information
- Current team: Lee Man
- Number: 4

Youth career
- 2012–2014: Gifu Kogyo High School

Senior career*
Years	Team	Apps	(Gls)
2016	Cetinje	14	(2)
2017–2018	Otrant	39	(2)
2018–2022	Petrovac	105	(4)
2022–	Lee Man	79	(7)
- * Club domestic league appearances and goals as of 20 November 2026

Ryoya Tachibana (立花 凌也, Tachibana Ryoya; born 4 April 1996) is a Japanese professional footballer who currently plays as a left-back for Hong Kong Premier League club Lee Man.

== Club career ==
On 15 July 2022, Lee Man announced the signing of Tachibana.

== Honour ==
Lee Man

- Hong Kong Premier League: 2023–24
- Hong Kong League Cup: 2025–26
