= Taufee Skandari =

Afghan footballer (born 1999)

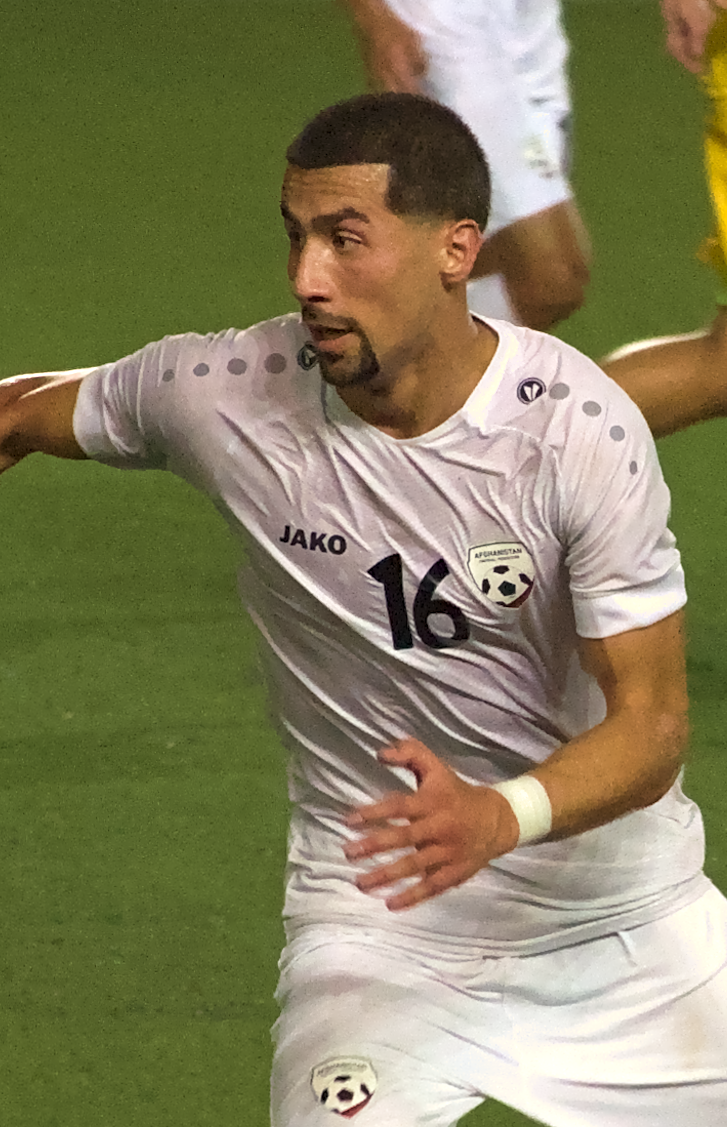
- Skandari with Afghanistan in 2023

Personal information
- Date of birth: 2 April 1999 (age 27)
- Place of birth: Kabul, Afghanistan
- Height: 1.81 m (5 ft 11 in)
- Positions: Attacking midfielder; winger

Senior career*
Years	Team	Apps	(Gls)
2017	Windsor	2	(0)
2018	Woodford Town	0	(0)
2018–2019	SK Bischofshofen	12	(0)
2019	Bursaspor	0	(0)
2020–2021	Northwood	2	(0)
2021–2022	Ware	33	(10)
2022–2023	New Salamis	20	(6)
2023	B36 Tórshavn	20	(3)
2024	PSIS Semarang	7	(0)
2025	Lee Man	10	(0)
2025	Abu Muslim		
2025–2026	Whitehawk	12	(0)
2026	Bracknell Town	0	(0)

International career^{‡}
2023–	Afghanistan	16	(0)
- * Club domestic league appearances and goals as of 10:55 14 April 2026 ‡ National team caps and goals as of 4 September 2025

Taufee Skandari (Dari: توفیق اسکندری; born 2 April 1999) is an Afghan professional footballer who plays as an attacking midfielder or winger.

== Club career ==
Skandari started his career with Windsor before joining Woodford Town and then spending a season abroad with Austrian Regionalliga side SK Bischofshofen and Turkish club Bursaspor. He then returned to England to join Northwood before moving to Ware.

In February 2023, he joined Faroe Islands Premier League side B36 Tórshavn from New Salamis. Skandari left B36 Tórshavn after the 2023 season.

On 9 August 2024, Skandari joined Liga 1 club PSIS Semarang. On 19 December 2024, he was released by the club after making seven appearances.

On 3 January 2025, Skandari signed for Hong Kong Premier League club Lee Man.

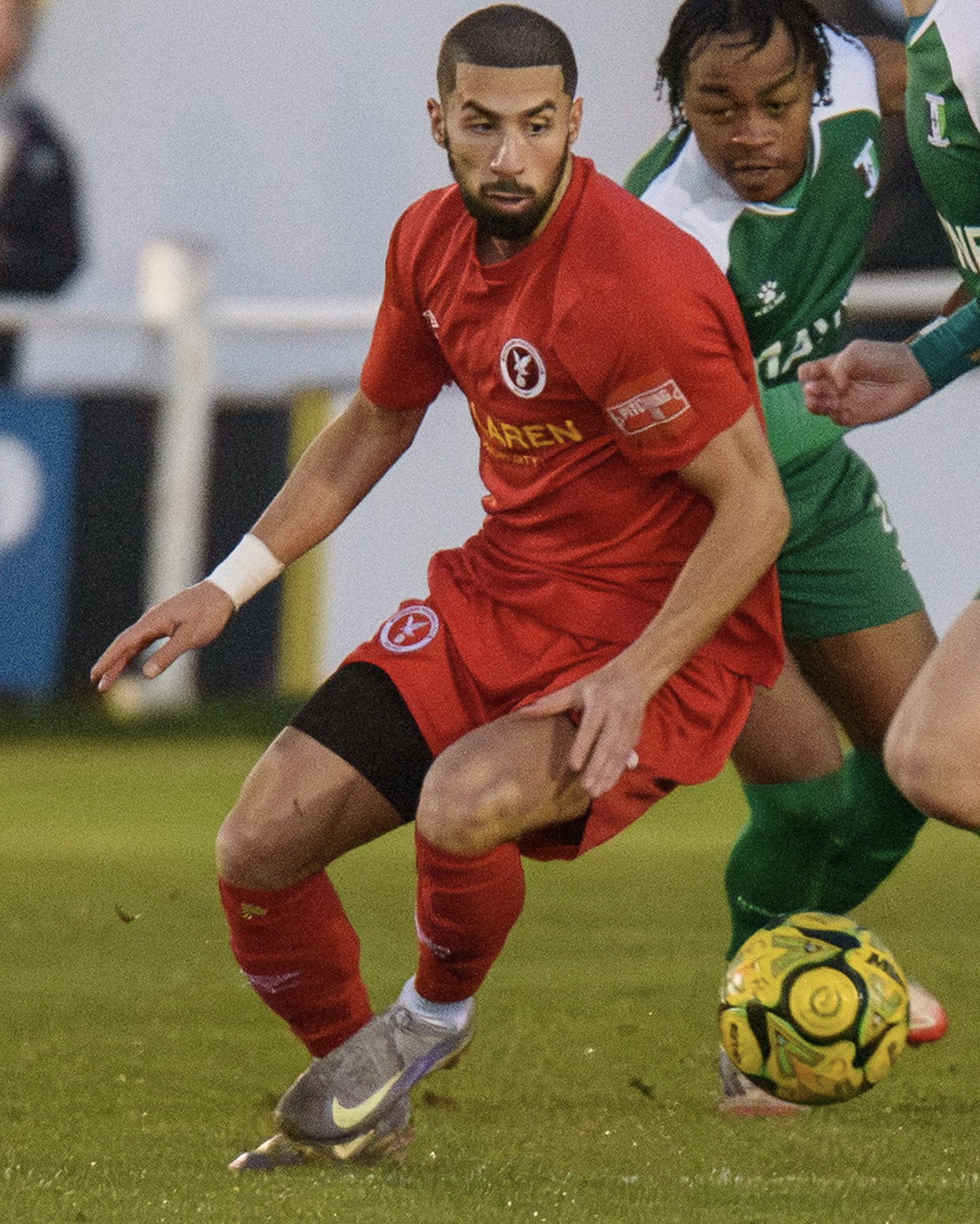
Skandari playing for Whitehawk in 2025

On 23 June 2025, Skandari joined Afghanistan Champions League side Abu Muslim.

Skandari joined Isthmian League Premier Division Brighton-based side Whitehawk in December 2025.

On 23 July 2026, Skandari joined Southern League Premier Division South side, Bracknell Town following his departure from Whitehawk.

== International career ==
In May 2023, Skandari was called up to the Afghanistan squad for the 2023 CAFA Nations Cup. On 10 June 2023, he made his senior international debut, starting in a 1–0 loss to Kyrgyzstan.

== Personal life ==
Skandari was born in Afghanistan before moving to England the following year.

He has also played for multiple clubs in Baller League UK, joining a number of players in the competition who have been capped at senior international level, a list that includes Kadell Daniel, Bakary Sako, and Michael Hector.

== Career statistics ==
=== International ===
As of match played 4 September 2025

Appearances and goals by national team and year
National team	Year	Apps	Goals
Afghanistan	2023	7	0
Afghanistan	2024	5	0
Afghanistan	2025	4	0
Total		16	0
