= Tang In Chim =

Hong Kong footballer

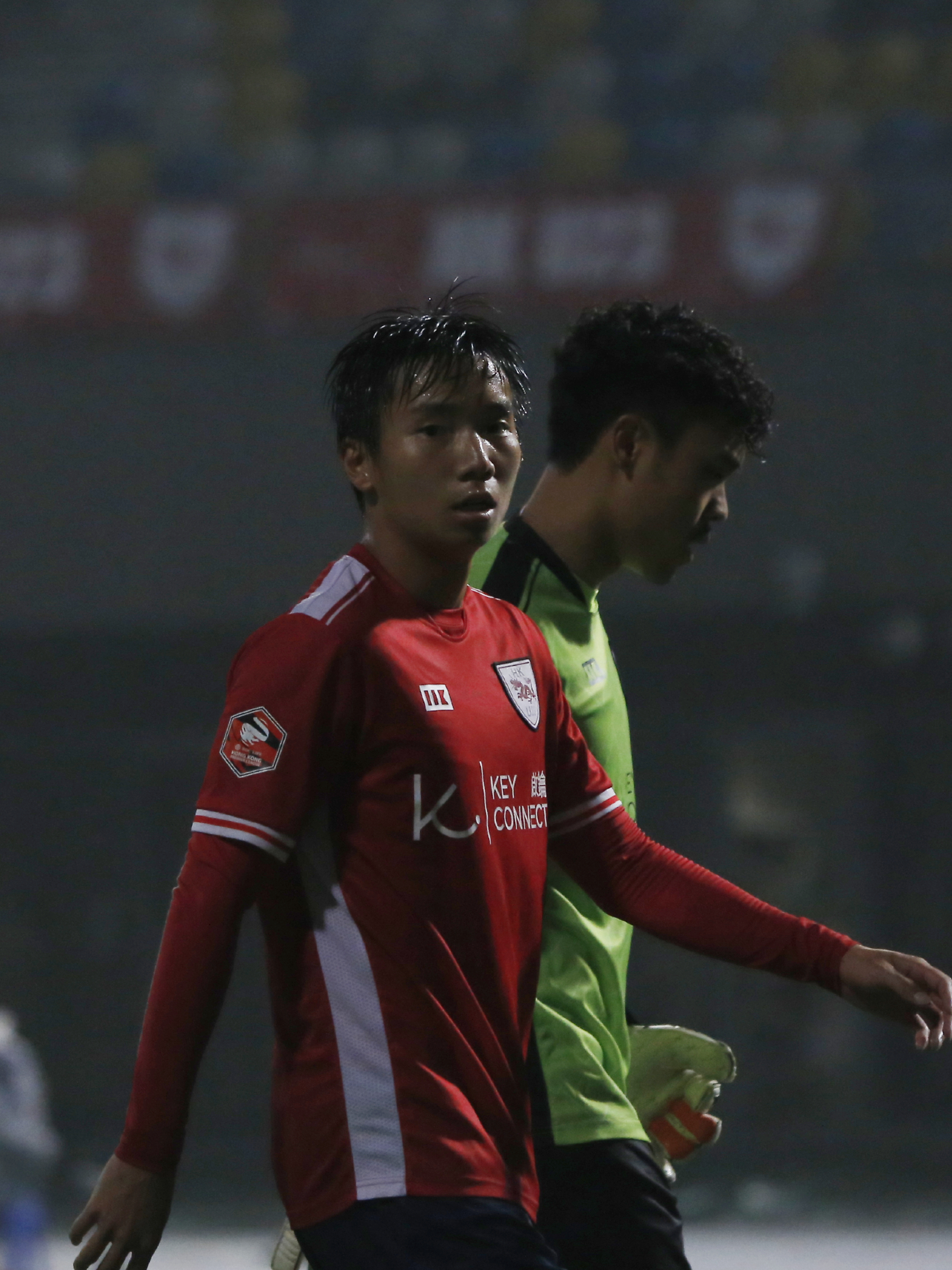

Personal information
- Full name: Tang In Chim
- Date of birth: 28 February 2003 (age 23)
- Place of birth: Hong Kong
- Height: 1.70 m (5 ft 7 in)
- Position: Midfielder

Youth career
- –2020: CFCSSHK
- 2020–2021: Happy Valley

Senior career*
Years	Team	Apps	(Gls)
2021–2024	HK U23	38	(0)
2024–2025	Lee Man	3	(0)
2026–	Yuen Long	0	(0)

International career^{‡}
2018	Hong Kong U-16	3	(1)
2022	Hong Kong U-19	4	(0)
2023–	Hong Kong U-22	1	(0)
- * Club domestic league appearances and goals as of 20 October 2024 ‡ National team caps and goals as of 24 March 2023

Tang In Chim (Chinese: 鄧筵霑; born 28 February 2003) is a Hong Kong former professional footballer who plays as a midfielder for Hong Kong First Division League club Yuen Long.

== Club career ==
On 2 September 2021, Tang joined HK U23.

On 6 July 2024, Tang joined Lee Man.

== Career statistics ==
=== Club ===
As of 26 May 2024

Club	Season	League			National Cup		League Cup		Other		Total	
Club	Season	Division	Apps	Goals	Apps	Goals	Apps	Goals	Apps	Goals	Apps	Goals
HK U23	2021–22	Hong Kong Premier League	4	0	1	0	4 (Note: Appearances in the Sapling Cup)	0	0	0	9	0
HK U23	2022–23	Hong Kong Premier League	14	0	1	0	7	1	1	0	23	1
HK U23	2023–24	Hong Kong Premier League	20	0	1	0	9	2	1	0	31	2
Career total			38	0	3	0	20	3	2	0	63	3
