= Ami Otaki =

Japanese footballer (born 1989)

Ami Otaki 大滝 麻未
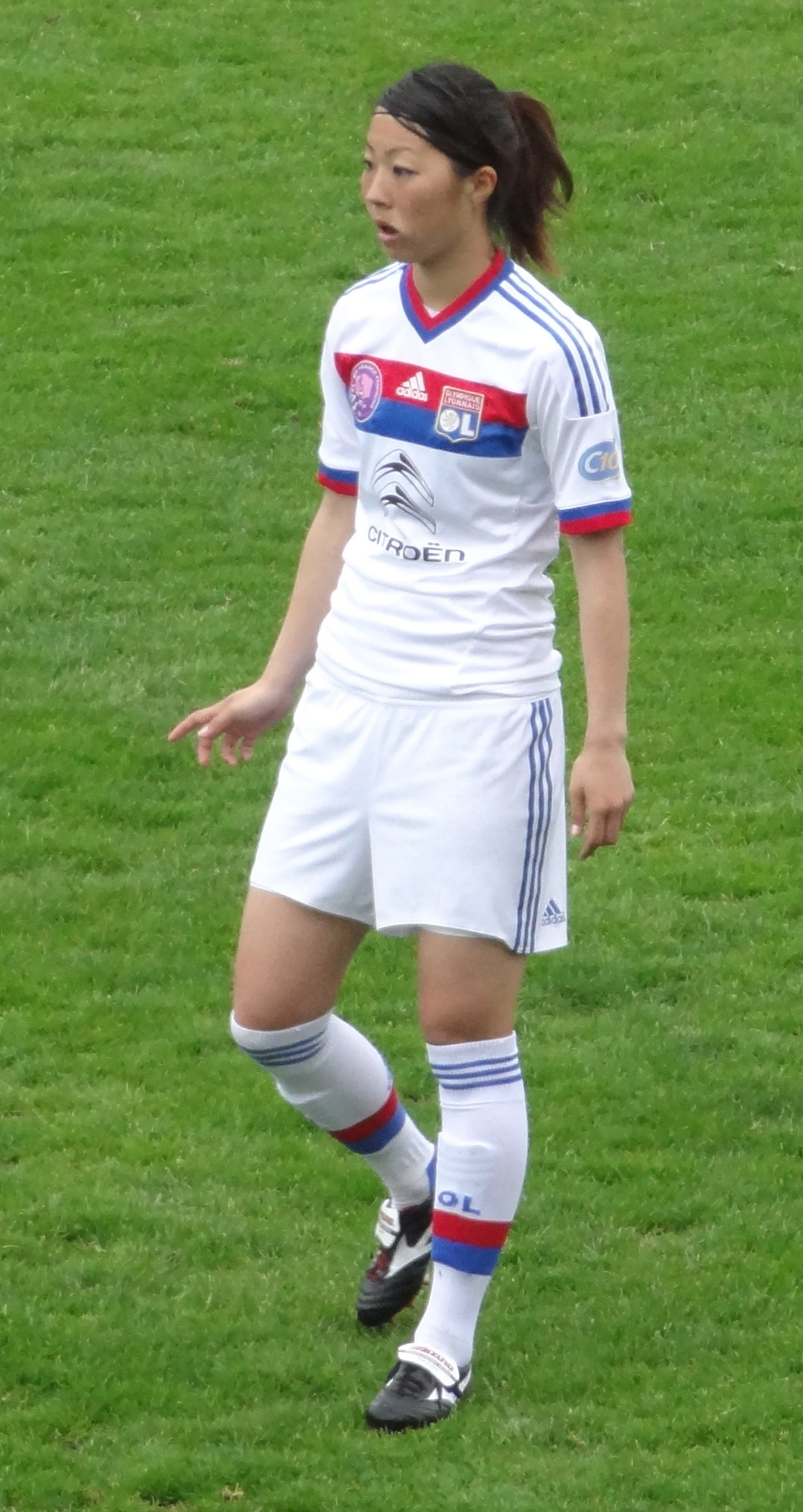

Personal information
- Full name: Ami Otaki
- Date of birth: July 28, 1989 (age 37)
- Place of birth: Hiratsuka, Kanagawa, Japan
- Height: 1.72 m (5 ft 7 1/2 in)
- Position: Forward

Team information
- Current team: JEF United Chiba
- Number: 9

Youth career
- 2002–2007: Yokosuka FC Seagulls
- 2008–2011: Waseda University

Senior career*
Years	Team	Apps	(Gls)
2012–2013	Olympique Lyonnais	15	(11)
2013–2014	Urawa Reds	21	(3)
2014–2015	En Avant Guingamp	5	(2)
2017	Paris FC	7	(2)
2018	NHK Spring Yokohama; FC Seagulls	18	(11)
2019–	JEF United Chiba	20	(9)
Total		66	(29)

International career
2012–2013	Japan	3	(0)
Medal record
Urawa Reds
Winner	Nadeshiko League	2014
Runner-up	Empress's Cup	2014
Representing Japan
AFC U-19 Women's Championship
Silver medal – second place	2007 China
- * Club domestic league appearances and goals as of December 31, 2018

Ami Otaki (大滝 麻未, Ōtaki Ami; born July 28, 1989) is a Japanese footballer who plays as a forward for JEF United Chiba. She has also played for the Japan national team.

== Club career ==
Otaki was born in Hiratsuka on July 28, 1989. After graduating from Waseda University, she joined French Division 1 club Olympique Lyonnais in 2012. The club won 2011–12 UEFA Champions League. In June 2013, she returned to Japan and joined Urawa Reds. In December 2014, she moved to the French club En Avant Guingamp. In May 2015, she retired end of 2014–15 season. In 2016, Otaki took a year away from football to participate in the 17th edition of the FIFA Master. She graduated in July 2017 and later that month signed a one-year contract with Paris FC. In January 2018, she returned to Japan and joined NHK Spring Yokohama FC Seagulls. In 2019, she moved to JEF United Chiba.

== National team career ==
On June 20, 2012, Otaki debuted for Japan national team against Sweden. She played 3 games for Japan until 2013.

== Club statistics ==
Club	Season	League		Cup		Continental		Total	
Club	Season	Apps	Goals	Apps	Goals	Apps	Goals	Apps	Goals
Olympique Lyonnais	2011–12	3	1	2	4	2	0	7	5
Olympique Lyonnais	2012–13	12	10	1	2	3	1	16	13
Olympique Lyonnais	Total	15	11	3	6	5	1	23	18
Career total		15	11	3	6	5	1	23	18

== National team statistics ==
Japan national team
Year	Apps	Goals
2012	1	0
2013	2	0
Total	3	0
