= Yang Yang (footballer) =

Chinese professional footballer

Personal information
- Full name: 杨杨
- Date of birth: 7 April 2007 (age 19)
- Place of birth: Xinyang, Henan, China
- Height: 1.78 m (5 ft 10 in)
- Position: Midfielder

Team information
- Current team: Shandong Taishan B
- Number: 48

Youth career
- Shandong Taishan U17

Senior career*
Years	Team	Apps	(Gls)
2024–	Shandong Taishan	0	(0)
2025–	→ Shandong Taishan B (res.)	12	(1)

International career^{‡}
2025–	China U19	4	(2)
- * Club domestic league appearances and goals as of 12 November 2026 ‡ National team caps and goals as of 12 November 2026

Yang Yang (Chinese: 杨杨; pinyin: Yang Yang; born 7 April 2007) is a Chinese professional footballer who plays as a midfielder for China League Two club Shandong Taishan B.

== Early life ==
Yang was born on 7 April 2007 in Xinyang, Henan.

== Club career ==
=== Shandong Taishan ===
On 15 July 2024, Shandong Taishan officially announced that Yang, along with Yue Ruijie, Wang Yuxuan and Hao Fubo, had been promoted from the U17 team to the first team for the second registration window of the 2024 season. The club described the four players as "outstanding young players cultivated by the club's youth academy."

On 26 May 2025, Yang came on as a substitute in the 87th minute for Shandong Taishan B against Jiangxi Lushan, making his professional debut.

On 22 August 2026, Yang scored a stoppage-time equalizer for Shandong Taishan B in a 2–2 draw against Nantong Haimen Codion in China League Two.

== International career ==
In March 2025, Yang was named in the Chinese Football Association's first 2007 age-group elite player training camp.

On 26 August 2025, Yang scored the opening goal and provided an assist in China U18's 3–0 win over Shimizu S-Pulse U18 at the 33rd China-Japan-Korea Sports Exchange Games.

In November 2025, Yang was called up to the China U18 national team for a training camp in Shanghai.

In March 2026, Yang was included in the China U19 squad for a training camp and the Yiwu International Youth Football Tournament. On 11 November 2026, he was named among the substitutes for China U19's Panda Cup match against Vietnam.

== Career statistics ==
=== Club ===
As of 12 November 2026

Appearances and goals by club, season and competition
Club	Season	League			National Cup		Continental		Other		Total	
Club	Season	Division	Apps	Goals	Apps	Goals	Apps	Goals	Apps	Goals	Apps	Goals
Shandong Taishan B	2025	China League Two	2	0	—		—		—		2	0
Shandong Taishan B	2026	China League Two	10	1	—		—		—		10	1
Career total			12	1	0	0	0	0	0	0	12	1
