= Zhu Wei =

Chinese artist

Zhu Wei (Chinese: 朱偉︱朱伟) is a Chinese artist. As one of China's most visible contemporary practitioners of the post-Tiananmen period, Zhu is known for his subtly quizzical critique of politics and society in a rapidly evolving China. Faithful to that country's quintessentially classical artistic medium, Chinese painting, the Beijing-born-and-based Zhu is principally a painter. In recent years, however, the artist has broadened his formal reach to include print-making as well as figurative sculpture. His China China series of monumental Mao-jacket-clad Chinese cadres, begun in 2000, has achieved iconic status. In most of his works, his vision often seems anguished and alienated, personal and political at the same time.

== Biography ==
Zhu Wei was born in Beijing in 1966. As a teenager, Zhu entered the military. His soldiering days ended when he was admitted to the People's Liberation Army Art Academy, finishing in 1989. After a few years of painting propaganda art for the motherland, his unit was demobilized in 1992. In the following year he went to study at the Beijing Academy of Film. Despite his educational background and association with the artistic values of state sanctioned art, Zhu has an incredible knowledge of Chinese tradition and spends enormous effort in perfecting his ink washes (also called Chinese painting), a technique popularized by Taoist artists in fourth and fifth centuries. His works are widely collected in Europe, the United States, Asia and often feature in international auctions.

== Exhibitions ==
Hubei Museum of Art, Tel Aviv Museum of Art, City Gallery Wellington, Beijing Today Art Museum, Williams College Museum of Art, China National Convention Center, Art Gallery of China National Academy of Painting, Museo Nacional de Bellas Artes Cuba, BELvue Museum of Belgium, National Contemporary Art Center of Greece, the State Tretyakov Gallery of Russia, Nanjing Museum, Art Complex Museum of Massachusetts, Asian Art Museum of San Francisco, Guangdong Museum of Art, Shenzhen Art Museum, Ashmolean Museum of Art and Archaeology, the National Art Museum of China, Grand Palais of France, Singapore Museum of Contemporary Arts, Jiangsu Art Museum, etc.
