= Ma Zixiang =

Chinese association football player

Personal information
- Date of birth: 9 February 1988 (age 38)
- Position: Defender

International career
Years	Team	Apps	(Gls)
- China

Ma Zixiang is a Chinese professional footballer who plays as a defender for the Chinese Women's Super League. She is also a member of the Chinese women's national football team. Zixiang represented China in the 2008 AFC Women's Asian Cup.
