= Kyle Macaulay =

Scottish footballer

Personal information
- Date of birth: 13 May 1986 (age 40)
- Place of birth: Elgin, Scotland
- Position: Midfielder

Team information
- Current team: Manchester United (scouting)

Youth career
- 2003–2005: Derby County

Senior career*
Years	Team	Apps	(Gls)
2005–2007	Aberdeen	5	(0)
2006–2007	→ Peterhead (loan)	7	(4)
2007	Peterhead	13	(2)
2008–2009	Alloa Athletic	42	(9)
2009–2010	Elgin City	34	(4)
- Huntly
Total		101	(19)
Medal record
Representing Great Britain
World University Games
Silver medal – second place	2011 Shenzhen	Men's Team
- * Club domestic league appearances and goals as of 28 July 2010

Kyle Macaulay (born 13 May 1986) is a Scottish former professional footballer who played as a midfielder. He works as head of senior scouting for Manchester United.

== Club career ==
Born in Elgin, he started his career at Derby County but after two years at Pride Park, he was released. Macaulay was signed by his uncle Steve Paterson for Aberdeen. He made his debut on 4 February 2006 against Heart of Midlothian at Tynecastle.

In November 2006 he was loaned out to Peterhead before signing a permanent deal with them on 31 January 2007. After leaving Peterhead in the summer of 2007, Macaulay was out of football for a few months until he signed for Alloa Athletic after a successful trial period. He scored for Alloa in February 2008 in a game against his former club Peterhead.

In 2011, Macaulay won a silver medal in the football at the 2011 Summer Universiade.

He continued playing semi-professional football in the Scottish League system until 2012, when he graduated from the University of Stirling.

== International career ==
Macaulay played for Scotland at youth international level.

== Post-retirement career ==
=== Ostersunds FK ===
Macaulay began in a non-playing role in Sweden shortly afterwards, working as a performance analyst at Östersunds for Graham Potter, where he spent six years.

=== Swansea City ===
Macaulay joined Swansea City in a similar role in June 2018, when Potter moved to the Welsh club. Swansea had a somewhat successful season back in the Championship following relegation from the Premier League in the season prior finishing in 10th place and reaching the quarter finals of the FA Cup.

=== Brighton & Hove Albion ===
Potter was appointed as the new Brighton & Hove Albion manager on 20 May 2019 where Macaulay, assistant manager Billy Reid and coach Bjorn Hamberg moved to the Sussex club alongside Potter.

=== Chelsea ===
On 8 September 2022, Macaulay followed Graham Potter on a move to Chelsea.

=== West Ham United ===
Macaulay left Chelsea to become head of recruitment for West Ham United in January 2025, once again reuniting with Potter.

=== Manchester United ===
Macaulay was appointed Head of Senior Scouting at Manchester United in November 2025.

== Personal life ==
Macaulay is the nephew of former manager Steve Paterson.
