= Makoto Rindo =

Japanese footballer

Makoto Rindo 林堂 眞
Personal information
- Full name: Makoto Rindo
- Date of birth: 21 November 1989 (age 36)
- Place of birth: Osaka, Japan
- Height: 1.78 m (5 ft 10 in)
- Position: Centre back

Youth career
- 1999–2000: Shimizu FC
- 2001: Kashiwa Reysol
- 2002–2004: Vivaio Funabashi SC
- 2005–2007: Narashino High School

College career
Years	Team	Apps	(Gls)
2008–2011	Komazawa University		

Senior career*
Years	Team	Apps	(Gls)
2012–2013	Ventforet Kofu	0	(0)
2013	→ Gainare Tottori (loan)	24	(2)
2014–2019	Ehime FC	185	(7)
2020–2023	Kataller Toyama	109	(12)
2023–2025	Hong Kong Rangers	33	(1)
Medal record
Representing Japan
Summer Universiade
Gold medal – first place	2022 Shenzhen	Team
- * Club domestic league appearances and goals as of 31 May 2025

Makoto Rindo (林堂 眞, Rindō Makoto; born 21 November 1989) is a former Japanese professional footballer who played as a centre back.

== Club career ==
Rindo played for the youth teams of Shimizu FC and Kashiwa Reysol during his primary school years. He played high school football for Narashino High School.

After graduating from high school, Rindo went on to study at Komazawa University, where he became captain of the university football team. He was part of the team which lifted the Prime Minister's Cup All Japan University Football Tournament in 2010. In 2011, he was selected to represent Japan at the 2011 Summer Universiade, where Japan went on to win the gold medal, after defeating Great Britain 2–1 in the final.

On 22 November 2011, Ventforet Kofu announced that they have signed Rindo ahead of the 2012 season. On 8 September 2012, Rindo made his professional debut in the Emperor's Cup second round match against Fukushima United.

On 4 May 2013, Rindo was loaned to Gainare Tottori.

On 17 December 2013, J2 club Ehime FC signed Rindo for the 2014 season.

On 25 November 2018, Ehime FC announced that Rindo will be leaving the club at the end of the season, following the expiration of his contract. One month later, Kataller Toyama announced the signing of Rindo on a free transfer.

On 26 December 2023, Kataller Toyama announced the departure of Rindo at the end of his contract. He joined Hong Kong Premier League club Rangers on the same day.

On 31 May 2025, Rindo announced his retirement from professional football.

== Career statistics ==
=== Club ===
Updated to end of 2018 season.

Club	Season	League			Cup		League Cup		Other		Total	
Club	Season	League	Apps	Goals	Apps	Goals	Apps	Goals	Apps	Goals	Apps	Goals
Komazawa University	2010	—			2	0	–		–		2	0
Ventforet Kofu	2012	J2 League	0	0	1	0	–		–		1	0
Ventforet Kofu	2013	J1 League	0	0	–		3	0	–		3	0
Ventforet Kofu	Total		0	0	1	0	3	0	–		4	0
Gainare Tottori (loan)	2013	J2 League	24	2	1	0	–		2 (Note: Appearances in the JFL Relegation Playoffs)	0	27	2
Ehime FC	2014	J2 League	34	2	2	0	–		–		36	2
Ehime FC	2015	J2 League	42	1	1	0	–		1 (Note: Appearance in the J1 Promotion Playoffs)	0	44	1
Ehime FC	2016	J2 League	42	3	1	0	–		–		43	3
Ehime FC	2017	J2 League	39	1	0	0	–		–		39	1
Ehime FC	2018	J2 League	25	0	0	0	–		–		25	0
Ehime FC	2019	J2 League	3	0	0	0	–		–		3	0
Ehime FC	Total		185	7	4	0	–		1	0	190	7
Kataller Toyama	2020	J3 League	31	0	1	0	–		–		32	0
Kataller Toyama	2021	J3 League	27	4	0	0	–		–		27	4
Kataller Toyama	2022	J3 League	34	8	1	0	–		–		35	8
Kataller Toyama	2023	J3 League	17	0	2	0	–		–		19	0
Kataller Toyama	Total		109	12	4	0	–		–		113	12
Hong Kong Rangers	2023–24	Hong Kong Premier League	11	1	0	0	7 (Note: Appearances in the Hong Kong Sapling Cup)	0	2 (Note: Appearances in the HKPLC Cup)	0	20	1
Hong Kong Rangers	2024–25	Hong Kong Premier League	10	0	0	0	2	0	2 (Note: Appearances in the Hong Kong Senior Challenge Shield)	0	14	0
Hong Kong Rangers	Total		21	1	0	0	9	0	4	0	34	1
Career total			339	22	12	0	12	0	7	0	370	22

== Honours ==
=== College ===
Komazawa University

- Prime Minister's Cup All Japan University Football Tournament: 2010

=== Club ===
Rangers

- Hong Kong Sapling Cup: 2023–24

=== Personal ===
- J3 League Best Eleven: 2022
- JPFA Awards J3 League Best Eleven: 2022
