= Daniele (footballer) =

Brazilian footballer (born 1983)

Personal information
- Full name: Daniele dos Santos de Paula Batista
- Date of birth: 2 April 1983 (age 43)
- Height: 1.64 m (5 ft 5 in)
- Position: Forward

Senior career*
Years	Team	Apps	(Gls)
- Vasco da Gama
2014	Botafogo	12	(6)
2015	Flamengo	4	(3)
2018	Kindermann/Avaí	2	(0)
2022–	CRESSPOM	7	(0)

International career^{‡}
	Brazil	12	(3)
- * Club domestic league appearances and goals ‡ National team caps and goals as of 26 June 2011 (before the 2011 FIFA Women's World Cup)

Daniele dos Santos de Paula Batista (born 2 April 1983), known as just Daniele, is a Brazilian footballer who plays as a forward for the Brazil women's national football team. She was part of the team at the 2011 FIFA Women's World Cup. At the club level, she has played for Vasco da Gama in Brazil.
