= Akito Kawamoto =

Japanese footballer

Personal information
- Full name: Akito Kawamoto
- Date of birth: 1 May 1990 (age 36)
- Place of birth: Shiga Prefecture, Japan
- Height: 1.75 m (5 ft 9 in)
- Position: Striker

Team information
- Current team: Nankatsu SC
- Number: 33

Youth career
- 2006–2008: RKU Kashiwa High School

College career
| Years | Team | Apps | (Gls) |
| 2009–2012 | Ryutsu Keizai University | | |

Senior career*
| Years | Team | Apps | (Gls) |
| 2013–2017 | Ventforet Kofu | 72 | (2) |
| 2015 | → Tochigi SC (loan) | 24 | (6) |
| 2018–2019 | Tokyo United | 18 | (6) |
| 2020– | Nankatsu SC | 20 | (6) |
- * Club domestic league appearances and goals as of 14 October 2022

Akito Kawamoto (河本 明人, Kawamoto Akito; born 1 May 1990) is a Japanese football player who plays for Nankatsu SC. He made his debut on 2 March 2013 in a 1–1 draw against Vegalta Sendai.

== Career statistics ==
Updated to 23 February 2016.

Appearances and goals by club, season and competition
| Club | Season | League | | | Emperor's Cup | | J.League Cup | | Total | |
| Club | Season | Division | Apps | Goals | Apps | Goals | Apps | Goals | Apps | Goals |
|---|---|---|---|---|---|---|---|---|---|---|
| Ventforet Kofu | 2013 | J1 League | 24 | 1 | 3 | 0 | 6 | 2 | 33 | 3 |
| Ventforet Kofu | 2014 | J1 League | 16 | 0 | 1 | 0 | 4 | 1 | 21 | 1 |
| Tochigi SC | 2015 | J2 League | 24 | 6 | 1 | 0 | — | | 25 | 6 |
| Career total | | | 64 | 7 | 5 | 0 | 10 | 3 | 79 | 10 |
