= Hikari Nakade =

Japanese footballer

Hikari Nakade 中出 ひかり
Personal information
- Full name: Hikari Nakade
- Date of birth: December 6, 1988 (age 37)
- Place of birth: Mie, Japan
- Height: 1.56 m (5 ft 1 1/2 in)
- Position: Forward

Youth career
- Kibi International University

Senior career*
Years	Team	Apps	(Gls)
- Iga FC Kunoichi

International career
2008	Japan U-20	2	(0)
2013	Japan	1	(0)
Medal record
Representing Japan
AFC U-19 Women's Championship
Silver medal – second place	2007 China
- * Club domestic league appearances and goals

Hikari Nakade (中出 ひかり, Nakade Hikari; born December 6, 1988) is a Japanese former football player. She played for the Japan national team as a forward.

== Club career ==
Nakade was born in Mie Prefecture on December 6, 1988. After graduating from Kibi International University, she played for Iga FC Kunoichi.

== National team career ==
In November 2008, Nakade was selected Japan U-20 national team for 2008 U-20 World Cup. On September 26, 2013, she debuted for Japan national team against Nigeria.

== National team statistics ==
Japan national team
Year	Apps	Goals
2013	1	0
Total	1	0
