= Li Wen (footballer) =

Chinese association football player

Personal information
- Full name: Li Wen
- Date of birth: 21 February 1989 (age 37)
- Place of birth: China,
- Height: 1.75 m (5 ft 9 in)
- Position: Midfielder

Senior career*
Years	Team	Apps	(Gls)
-2020	Dalian	1	(0)
2021-2022	Changchun Public Excellence	23	(6)

International career^{‡}
2012–2019	China	33	(3)
- * Club domestic league appearances and goals as of 17 June 2019 ‡ National team caps and goals as of 17 June 2019

Li Wen (Chinese: 李雯; born 21 February 1989) is a Chinese former footballer who played as a midfielder.

== Career statistics ==
=== International ===
As of matches played 7 June 2019.

National team	Year	Apps	Goals
China	2017	4	0
China	2018	0	0
China	2019	1	0
Total		5	0
