= 2019 WAFF Women's Championship squads =

The 2019 WAFF Women's Championship was an international women's football tournament held in Bahrain from 7 to 15 January 2019. The five national teams involved in the tournament were required to register a squad of 23 players, including three goalkeepers. Only players in these squads were eligible to take part in the tournament.

The age listed for each player is on 7 January 2019, the first day of the tournament. The numbers of caps and goals listed for each player do not include any matches played after the start of tournament. The club listed is the club for which the player last played a competitive match prior to the tournament. (Note: This is the club a player was last able to play for during the previous season in the event a player did not play a competitive match.) The nationality for each club reflects the national association (not the league) to which the club is affiliated. A flag is included for coaches who are of a different nationality than their own national team.

== Teams ==
=== Bahrain ===
Coach: Khaled Mohamed Kharban

No.	Pos.	Player	Date of birth (age)	Caps	Goals	Club
1	GK	Dana Noor				
2	DF	Leah Sarwani	11 July 2002 (aged 16)			
3	MF	Eman Ramadhan	7 January 1992 (aged 27)			
4	MF	Deena Abdelrahman	23 February 1983 (aged 35)			
7	FW	Reem Al-Hashmi	27 June 1987 (aged 31)			
8	MF	Dwa Al Khalifa	29 November 1987 (aged 31)			
9	FW	Hessa Al Isa	30 August 1995 (aged 23)			
10	DF	Alyaa Al Mudhahki	23 September 1987 (aged 31)			
11	FW	Rose Tobellah	28 January 1998 (aged 20)			
13	DF	Manar Yaqoob	27 July 1994 (aged 24)			
14	DF	Fatema Isa	14 December 1990 (aged 28)			
15	DF	Marwa Zayed	13 September 1988 (aged 30)			
16	FW	Noora Al Dossary	1 August 2000 (aged 18)			
17	MF	Yasmeen Tobellah	17 September 1989 (aged 29)			
18	DF	Marwa Al Majiri				
19	DF	Fatema Al Nesuf	19 September 1998 (aged 20)			
21	MF	Phoebe Licence	20 August 1999 (aged 19)			
22	GK	Khulood Abdulla	13 November 1997 (aged 21)			
23	MF	Eman Al Khattal	14 March 1999 (aged 19)			
25	MF	Rama Salim	15 October 1986 (aged 32)			
29	FW	Amira Sowar	18 January 1998 (aged 20)			
30	MF	Leleya Sabkar	15 July 2002 (aged 16)			
35	GK	Huda Salman	21 September 1988 (aged 30)			

=== Jordan ===
Coach: (Algeria) Azzedine Chih

No.	Pos.	Player	Date of birth (age)	Caps	Goals	Club
1	GK	Sherin Al-Shalabe	3 June 1994 (aged 24)			
2	DF	Haya Khalil	12 September 1994 (aged 24)			
3	DF	Alanoud Al Zabrey	18 May 1999 (aged 19)			
4	MF	Luna Al Masri	9 March 1994 (aged 24)			
5	DF	Anfal Al-Sufy	14 October 1995 (aged 23)			
6	FW	Razan Al-Zagha	23 March 1995 (aged 23)			
7	MF	Raya Hina	26 November 1995 (aged 23)			
8	MF	Stephanie Al-Naber	12 July 1987 (aged 31)			
9	FW	Abeer Al-Nahar	13 February 1991 (aged 27)			
10	MF	Natasha Al-Naber	15 March 1995 (aged 23)			
11	FW	Maysa Jbarah	20 September 1989 (aged 29)			
12	GK	Joud Al Shanty	26 July 1999 (aged 19)			
13	MF	Lana Feras	1 June 1998 (aged 20)			
14	FW	Leen Al Btoush	20 July 2001 (aged 17)			
15	MF	Mai Sweilem	25 September 1995 (aged 23)			
16	MF	Shahnaz Jebreen	28 July 1992 (aged 26)			
17	DF	Nour Zoqash	1 September 1999 (aged 19)			
18	FW	Tala Al Barghouthy	11 April 2002 (aged 16)			
19	DF	Ayah Al-Majali	9 March 1992 (aged 26)			
20	MF	Shorooq Shathli	6 January 1987 (aged 32)			
21	DF	Rand Abu-Hussein	1 March 1997 (aged 21)			
22	GK	Malak Shannak	1 August 1998 (aged 20)			
23	MF	Tasneem Abu-Rob	4 March 2001 (aged 17)			

=== United Arab Emirates ===
Coach: Houriya Taheri

No.	Pos.	Player	Date of birth (age)	Caps	Goals	Club
3	DF	Ghanima Rashid	22 October 2003 (aged 15)			
4	MF	Alanoud Faleh	26 November 1993 (aged 25)			
5	DF	Ameena Al Hosani	18 August 1986 (aged 32)			
6	DF	Shamma Al Mansoori	17 November 1992 (aged 26)			
7	MF	Shahad Khaled	14 March 2002 (aged 16)			
8	DF	Fatima Al Noobi	11 December 2001 (aged 17)			
9	FW	Asma Al Muntaser	28 March 1988 (aged 30)			
10	MF	Nouf Faleh	14 November 1996 (aged 22)			
11	FW	Alanoud Khaled	30 October 2001 (aged 17)			
13	MF	Areej Al Hammadi	13 February 1986 (aged 32)			
14	DF	Nehal Abdelaziz	18 August 1978 (aged 40)			
15	FW	Afra Al Mheiri	15 May 1991 (aged 27)			
16	DF	Salha Rashid	26 May 2001 (aged 17)			
17	FW	Amal Wael	7 June 1991 (aged 27)			
19	DF	Rawan Al Hammadi	12 November 2002 (aged 16)			
20	MF	Aalya Humaid	31 October 2003 (aged 15)			
21	MF	Najla Essa	30 January 2005 (aged 13)			
22	GK	Noura Al Mazrooei	2 January 1984 (aged 35)			
23	DF	Fatema Al Marzooqi	25 October 2004 (aged 14)			
25	DF	Oshba Salem	6 June 1993 (aged 25)			
30	FW	Naeema Ibrahim	30 December 1999 (aged 19)			
35	GK	Badreyya Al Mansoori	16 June 1998 (aged 20)			
41	GK	Maha Al Blooshi	17 May 2004 (aged 14)			

=== Palestine ===
Coach: Raed Al Khdour

No.	Pos.	Player	Date of birth (age)	Caps	Goals	Club
1		Razan Al Qazaha	27 June 2000 (aged 18)			
3		Mariamcicilia Nazzal	20 February 1999 (aged 19)			
4		Joulia Nassar	26 April 1999 (aged 19)			
5		Ayah Khattab	22 December 1999 (aged 19)			
6		Taymaa Qatamesh	3 November 1997 (aged 21)			
7		Talin Helta	12 February 1996 (aged 22)			
8		Bartina Qumseya	12 May 1996 (aged 22)			
9		Caroline Sohgian	8 July 1993 (aged 25)			
10		Lurin Tanas	5 December 1998 (aged 20)			
11		Ayah Al Khatib	19 September 1993 (aged 25)			
12		Sineen Bazian	22 November 2000 (aged 18)			
13		Mariam Istefan	2 December 1999 (aged 19)			
14		Nadin Elias	31 May 1995 (aged 23)			
15		Israa Al Zabon	21 October 1994 (aged 24)			
16		Shaden Abuzuluf	16 February 1997 (aged 21)			
17		Mira Natour	15 May 1999 (aged 19)			
18		Rimah Adawi	8 April 1999 (aged 19)			
19		Ahlam Abueed	3 April 1999 (aged 19)			
20		Saja Kanaaneh	3 February 1996 (aged 22)			
21		Dima Said	27 May 1994 (aged 24)			
22		Leen Qatawi	12 June 2000 (aged 18)			
25		Nour Eleyan	1 June 1998 (aged 20)			

=== Lebanon ===
Coach: Wael Gharzeddine

No.	Pos.	Player	Date of birth (age)	Caps	Goals	Club
1	GK	Racha Yaghi	10 June 2002 (aged 16)	2	0	(Lebanese Football Association) Akhaa Ahli Aley
2	DF	Mira Hoteit	20 September 2000 (aged 18)	2	0	(Lebanese Football Association) Zouk Mosbeh
3	DF	Christelle Bedran	5 December 2000 (aged 18)	0	0	(Lebanese Football Association) Sporting High
4	DF	Amal Salha	2 December 2000 (aged 18)	0	0	(Lebanese Football Association) Akhaa Ahli Aley
5	DF	Lara Bahlawan	5 September 1994 (aged 24)	9	3	(Lebanese Football Association) SAS
6	MF	Tatiana Khalil (captain)	3 November 1992 (aged 26)	2	1	(Lebanese Football Association) SAS
7	FW	Samira Awad	30 June 2000 (aged 18)	2	0	(Lebanese Football Association) ÓBerytus
8	MF	Lili Iskandar	16 May 2002 (aged 16)	2	0	(Lebanese Football Association) Salam Zgharta
10	FW	Yara Bou Rada	7 August 2000 (aged 18)	2	0	(Lebanese Football Association) SAS
11	FW	Hanin Tamim	5 April 2000 (aged 18)	2	0	(Lebanese Football Association) SAS
12	DF	Aya Jamal-Eddine	11 October 1997 (aged 21)	1	0	(Lebanese Football Association) SAS
13	MF	Rhea May Taleb	20 March 2001 (aged 17)	0	0	(Lebanese Football Association) ÓBerytus
14	DF	Ithamar Romanos	10 May 1999 (aged 19)	2	0	(Lebanese Football Association) ÓBerytus
15	DF	Aya Al Jurdi	8 April 1998 (aged 20)	0	0	(Lebanese Football Association) SAS
16	MF	Joya Maria Azzi	23 September 2000 (aged 18)	1	0	(Lebanese Football Association) Zouk Mosbeh
17	DF	Dima Al Kasti	13 December 2001 (aged 17)	0	0	(Lebanese Football Association) Akhaa Ahli Aley
18	DF	Celine Al Haddad	12 March 2001 (aged 17)	0	0	(Lebanese Football Association) Akhaa Ahli Aley
19	MF	Rana Al Mokdad	18 November 1998 (aged 20)	1	0	(Lebanese Football Association) SAS
20	MF	Aya Boukhary	4 October 2002 (aged 16)	0	0	(Lebanese Football Association) Salam Zgharta
21	MF	Fatima Al Zahraa Khachab	22 July 1999 (aged 19)	1	0	(Lebanese Football Association) Zouk Mosbeh
22	GK	Yasmin Sardouk	20 May 2000 (aged 18)	0	0	(Lebanese Football Association) ÓBerytus
23	GK	Arlette Ghostine	25 June 2002 (aged 16)	0	0	(Lebanese Football Association) Salam Zgharta
