= Nancy Tchaylian =

Lebanese footballer (born 1991)

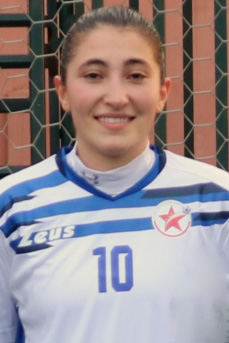
- Tchaylian with SAS in 2020

Personal information
- Full name: Nancy Krikor Tchaylian
- Date of birth: 28 May 1991 (age 35)
- Place of birth: Bourj Hammoud, Lebanon
- Height: 1.67 m (5 ft 6 in)
- Position: Attacking midfielder

Team information
- Current team: Jwaya
- Number: 10

Senior career*
| Years | Team | Apps | (Gls) |
| 2007–2009 | Ansar | | |
| 2009–2010 | Athletico | | |
| 2010–2014 | Sadaka | | |
| 2014–2016 | SAS | | |
| 2016 | FC Beirut | | |
| 2017 | Shooterz (futsal) | | |
| 2017–2019 | Zouk Mosbeh | | |
| 2019 | Alashkert | | |
| 2019–2020 | SAS | | (3) |
| 2020 | Al-Arabi (futsal) | | |
| 2020–2021 | SAS | 10 | (9) |
| 2021 | Police Club (futsal) | | |
| 2021–2022 | SAS | 4 | (0) |
| 2022–2023 | Al-Shabab | 12 | (5) |
| 2023 | SAS | 1 | (0) |
| 2023–2024 | Al-Taqadom | | |
| 2024 | SAS | 5 | (5) |
| 2025 | ÓBerytus | 10 | (9) |
| 2025–2026 | Nejmeh | 12 | (10) |
| 2026– | Jwaya | 0 | (0) |

International career^{‡}
| 2012–2018 | Lebanon (futsal) | 7 | (8) |
| 2010–2021 | Lebanon | 8 | (0) |
- * Club domestic league appearances and goals as of 28 June 2026 ‡ National team caps and goals as of 18:19, 15 April 2021 (UTC)

Nancy Krikor Tchaylian (Arabic: نانسي كريكور تشايليان; born 28 May 1991) is a Lebanese football and futsal player who plays as an attacking midfielder for Lebanese club Jwaya.

== Early life ==
Born in Bourj Hammoud, Lebanon, Tchaylian is of Armenian descent. She began playing football aged nine, in 2000, at a time when women's football in Lebanon had few clubs, training facilities or tournament venues.

== Club career ==
Starting her career in futsal, Tchaylian switched to football and played for Ansar. She then played for several other teams in the Lebanese Women's Football League, namely Athletico, Sadaka, SAS and FC Beirut. In 2017 she joined Zouk Mosbeh and played for their futsal club (Shooterz), before returning to play football at the same club.

In 2019, Tchaylian joined Armenian league champions Alashkert to compete in the UEFA Women's Champions League. She returned to Lebanon and joined SAS on 27 August 2019, helping her team finish runners-up of the 2019 WAFF Women's Clubs Championship as the tournament's best player. On 21 January 2020, Tchaylian moved to Kuwaiti futsal club Al-Arabi for one-and-a-half months to play the Final Four stage of the season. In December 2021, Tchaylian played for Police Club in the Maldives.

Tchaylian moved to Al-Shabab, competing in the 2022–23 Saudi Women's Premier League, in October 2022. She scored a hat-trick on 21 October, in a 3–3 draw against Al-Nassr in the second matchday. Tchalyan finished the season with six goals, helping her side to a third-place finish. On 28 July 2023, Tchaylian joined newly-formed Al-Taqadom ahead of the 2023–24 Saudi Women's First Division League, on a seven-month contract.

Tchaylian finished top scorer of the 2024–25 Lebanese Women's League with ÓBerytus, scoring eight goals and helping her team to a historic second-place finish. On 18 November 2025, Tchaylian was presented as Nejmeh's first signing in their history. In August 2026, Tchaylian joined Jwaya.

== International career ==
Tchaylian represented Lebanon internationally for several years. Although she was eligible to play for Armenia through her heritage, she said she was unable to do so because she had already played for Lebanon. She was offered an opportunity to play for Armenia in the 2023 FIFA Women's World Cup qualification but did not take it.

Tchaylian represented Lebanon internationally for several years. She was later approached about representing Armenia in the 2023 FIFA Women's World Cup qualifiers, but was unable to do so because of her previous international appearances for Lebanon.

== Honours ==
Sadaka

- Lebanese Women's Football League: 2010–11, 2011–12, 2012–13
- Lebanese Women's FA Cup: 2010–11, 2011–12

SAS

- Lebanese Women's Football League: 2014–15, 2019–20, 2021–22, 2022–23
- Lebanese Women's FA Cup: 2014–15

FC Beirut

- Lebanese Women's FA Cup: 2015–16
- Lebanese Women's Super Cup: 2015–16

Zouk Mosbeh

- Lebanese Women's Football League: 2017–18
- Lebanese Women's FA Cup: 2016–17, 2017–18
- Lebanese Women's Super Cup: 2017

ÓBerytus

- Lebanese Women's Football League: 2024–25

Individual

- WAFF Women's Clubs Championship Best Player winner: 2019
- Lebanese Women's Football League Best Player winner: 2010–11
- Lebanese Women's Football League top goalscorer: 2016–17, 2024–25

== See also ==
- List of Lebanon women's international footballers
