= Sahar Dbouk =

Lebanese footballer and coach (born 1985)

Personal information
- Date of birth: 5 October 1985 (age 41)
- Place of birth: Tyre, Lebanon
- Position: Centre-back

Senior career*
Years	Team	Apps	(Gls)
2006–2009	Ansar		
2009–2014	Sadaka		
2019–2024	Super Girls	23	(1)

International career
2007–2015	Lebanon	15+	(1)

Managerial career
- 2021–2024: Super Girls
- 2022–2024: Lebanon U16
- 2025–: Saudi Arabia U15
Medal record
Women's football
Representing Lebanon (as player)
WAFF Women's Championship
Bronze medal – third place	2007
Representing Lebanon (as manager)
WAFF U-16 Girls Championship
Gold medal – first place	2023	U-16 Team
- * Club domestic league appearances and goals

Sahar Dbouk (Arabic: سحر دبوق; born 5 October 1985) is a Lebanese football coach and former player who is the head coach of the Saudi Arabia women's national under-15 team. A centre-back, she played for the Lebanon national team and has also coached Lebanese youth and club teams.

== Playing career ==
=== Club career ===
Dbouk began her football career with Ansar, where she played from 2006 to 2009, before joining Sadaka. She played for Sadaka until their dissolution in 2014. During her time at the club, she travelled from southern Lebanon to Beirut every two days for training. Dbouk was nominated Best Player of the Lebanese Women's Football League for the 2012 season.

=== International career ===
Dbouk represented Lebanon between 2007 and 2015. She participated in the 2006 Arab Women's Championship and the 2007 WAFF Women's Championship, and later played in the 2014 AFC Women's Asian Cup qualification in 2013. During the latter competition, she scored in Lebanon's 12–1 victory over Kuwait on 9 June 2013.

== Managerial career ==
Dbouk began working in girls' football development in Tyre, where she and former international player Sarah Awally established a football academy in 2010. The project initially involved four girls and gradually expanded as more families became involved. The initiative developed into Super Girls, a girls' football club and academy in southern Lebanon. By 2023, the academy had grown to include more than 50 girls aged between four and twelve.

Dbouk served as a coach at Super Girls and worked with the Lebanese Football Association's youth national teams. In 2022, she coached Lebanon's under-16 team (Lebanon "B") at the WAFF U-18 Girls Championship. She subsequently led the team to victory at the 2023 WAFF U-16 Girls Championship.

On 24 September 2025, the Saudi Arabian Football Federation appointed Dbouk to supervise the newly established Saudi Arabia under-15 girls' national team. She led the team during its first training camp in September 2025 and continued in the role during preparations for its first international competition.

== Career statistics ==
=== International ===
Scores and results list Lebanon's goal tally first, score column indicates score after each Dbouk goal.

List of international goals scored by Sahar Dbouk
No.	Date	Venue	Opponent	Score	Result	Competition	Ref.
1	9 June 2013	Amman International Stadium, Amman, Jordan	Kuwait	1–0	12–1	2014 AFC Women's Asian Cup qualification	

== Honours ==
=== Player ===
Ansar

- Lebanese Women's FA Cup runner-up: 2007–08, 2008–09

Sadaka

- Lebanese Women's Football League: 2008–09, 2009–10, 2010–11, 2011–12, 2012–13
- Lebanese Women's FA Cup: 2008–09, 2009–10, 2010–11, 2011–12

Lebanon

- WAFF Women's Championship third place: 2007

=== Manager ===
Lebanon U16

- WAFF U-16 Championship: 2022

== See also ==
- List of Lebanon women's international footballers
