= Sara Bakri =

Lebanese football and futsal player (born 1989)

Personal information
- Full name: Sara Abbas Bakri
- Date of birth: 1 November 1989 (age 37)
- Place of birth: Beirut, Lebanon
- Position: Midfielder

Youth career
- Arz

Senior career*
Years	Team	Apps	(Gls)
2008–2014	Sadaka		
2014–2019	SAS		
2019–2023	BFA		
Total			(120)

International career
2006–2017	Lebanon	22	(7)
2008–2018	Lebanon (futsal)		
Medal record
Women's football
Representing Lebanon
WAFF Women's Championship
Bronze medal – third place	2007
- * Club domestic league appearances and goals

Sara Abbas Bakri (Arabic: سارة عباس بكري; born 1 November 1989) is a Lebanese former footballer and futsal player who played as a midfielder. She represented Lebanon internationally in both football and futsal.

With seven goals in 22 appearances between 2006 and 2017, Bakri was the Lebanon national football team's all-time top goalscorer and most-capped player, before both records were broken in 2023.

== Early life ==
Born on 1 November 1989, in Beirut, Lebanon, Bakri has two sisters and a brother. She began playing football at the age of seven.

== Club career ==
Bakri played for Arz, before moving to Sadaka in the Lebanese Women's Football League. She helped them win several domestic titles. Bakri joined SAS in 2014, with whom she also won multiple titles. She joined BFA on 30 September 2019. After suffering an ACL tear in 2022, Bakri retired in 2023.

== International career ==
Bakri has been capped for Lebanon at senior level in both football and futsal.

In football, she represented Lebanon in multiple competitions, namely the 2010 Arabia Women's Cup and the 2014 AFC Women's Asian Cup qualification in 2013, where she played three games and scored a goal against Kuwait. Bakri scored seven goals in 22 games between 2006 and 2017; she was her national team's all-time top goalscorer before being surpassed by Christy Maalouf in 2023, and the joint-most capped player – alongside Taghrid Hamadeh – before being surpassed by Rana Al Mokdad in 2023.

In futsal, Bakri played for Lebanon at the WAFF Women's Futsal Championship in 2008 and 2012, and the AFC Women's Futsal Championship in 2018.

== Career statistics ==
=== International ===
Scores and results list Lebanon's goal tally first, score column indicates score after each Bakri goal.

List of international goals scored by Sara Bakri
No.	Date	Venue	Opponent	Score	Result	Competition	Ref.
1	19 October 2010	Al Ahli Stadium, Manama, Bahrain	Egypt	1–?	1–5	2010 Arabia Women's Cup	
2	21 October 2010	Al Ahli Stadium, Manama, Bahrain	Jordan	1–?	1–3	2010 Arabia Women's Cup	
3	23 October 2010	Bahrain National Stadium, Riffa, Bahrain	Iraq	?–0	9–0	2010 Arabia Women's Cup	
4	23 October 2010	Bahrain National Stadium, Riffa, Bahrain	Iraq	?–0	9–0	2010 Arabia Women's Cup	
5	9 June 2013	Amman International Stadium, Amman, Jordan	Kuwait	11–0	12–1	2014 AFC Women's Asian Cup qualification	
6	15 September 2011	Petra Stadium, Amman, Jordan	Jordan	1–6	1–10	Friendly	
7	21 March 2017	Bir Hassan Stadium, Beirut, Lebanon	Syria	1–0	4–0	Friendly	

== Honours ==
Sadaka

- Lebanese Women's Football League: 2007–08, 2008–09, 2009–10, 2010–11, 2011–12, 2012–13, 2013–14
- Lebanese Women's FA Cup: 2007–08, 2008–09, 2009–10, 2010–11, 2011–12

SAS

- Lebanese Women's Football League: 2014–15, 2015–16, 2016–17, 2018–19
- Lebanese Women's FA Cup: 2014–15, 2018–19
- Lebanese Women's Super Cup: 2016–17

Lebanon

- WAFF Women's Championship third place: 2007

Individual

- Lebanese Women's Football League top goalscorer: 2014–15

== See also ==
- List of Lebanon women's international footballers
