= Jouana Hamze =

Lebanese footballer and coach (born 1988)

Personal information
- Full name: Jouana Toufic Hamze
- Date of birth: 13 October 1988 (age 38)
- Place of birth: Beirut, Lebanon
- Position: Defender

Team information
- Current team: Jwaya (head coach)

Senior career*
Years	Team	Apps	(Gls)
2007	Sadaka		
2007–2009	Ansar		
2010–2012	Sadaka		

International career
2010–2013	Lebanon	8+	(0)

Managerial career
- 2022–2023: Lebanon U18
- 2023: Lebanon U19
- 2023: Lebanon U20
- 2023–2024: Lebanon
- 2024: Lebanon (assistant)
- 2024: Lebanon U18
- 2024: Lebanon U20
- 2025–2026: No Limits
- 2026–: Jwaya
Medal record
Women's football
Representing Lebanon (as manager)
WAFF U-18 Girls Championship
Gold medal – first place	2022	U-18 Team
- * Club domestic league appearances and goals

Jouana Toufic Hamze (Arabic: جوانا توفيق حمزة; born 13 October 1988) is a Lebanese football coach and former player who is the head coach of Lebanese club Jwaya. She played as a defender for the Lebanon national team.

== Club career ==
Hamze played for Sadaka in 2007, then moved Ansar and played in 2007–08 and 2008–09. She then returned to Sadaka, playing in 2010–11 and 2011–12.

== International career ==
Hamze made her senior debut for Lebanon on 19 October 2010, in a 5–1 defeat to Egypt. She capped during the 2010 Arabia Women's Cup, the 2011 WAFF Women's Championship and the 2014 AFC Women's Asian Cup qualification.

== Managerial career ==
Hamze was head coach of the Lebanon women's national under-18 team at the 2022 WAFF U-18 Girls Championship, in which she helped Lebanon lift the title after defeating Syria 5–1 in the final. She also coached the under-20 team at the 2024 AFC U-20 Women's Asian Cup qualification, in which Lebanon qualified to the second round.

On 9 July 2023, Hamze was appointed head coach of Lebanon women's national team. On 18 and 21 July, she helped Lebanon beat Palestine 5–0 and 2–1 in her first two games as Lebanon coach. In September 2023, Hamze led Lebanon to win the 2023 SAFF Friendly Tournament in Saudi Arabia. She became assistant coach in 2024.

Hamze was appointed head coach of No Limits in September 2025, helping them lift the 2025–26 Lebanese Women's Football League title for the first time. In August 2026, she was announced head coach of Jwaya.

== Personal life ==
Her paternal uncle, Salim Hamze, was also an international footballer for Lebanon during the 1990s.

== Honours ==
=== Manager ===
Lebanon U18

- WAFF U-18 Girls Championship: 2022

No Limits

- Lebanese Women's Football League: 2025–26

== See also ==
- List of Lebanon women's international footballers
- List of association football families
