= Australian soccer coaches in head coaching positions overseas =

OCE

There has been an increasing number of Australian football coaches gaining employment overseas in recent years, with coaches such as Ange Postecoglou, Kevin Muscat and Harry Kewell having been appointed to manage major clubs in Europe and Asia.

The first Australian football coach to take charge of a club in one of Europe's Big Five leagues was Patrick Kisnorbo at Troyes.

The first Australian to win a championship in Europe was Anthony Limbrick at The New Saints in Wales, followed by Postecoglou with Celtic in Scotland.

Postecoglou went on to win the Europa League with Tottenham Hotspur on May 21, 2025. It was the club's first trophy in 17 years.

== List of Australian head coaches currently employed overseas ==
Coach	Employer	Competition	Tier
Mel Andreatta	Scotland women	(Scotland) FIFA	1
Graham Arnold	Iraq	(Iraq) FIFA	1
Tom Ballantyne	Sha Tin	Hong Kong Premier League	1
Dan Barrett	Solomon Islands women	(Solomon Islands) FIFA	1
Leah Blayney	Calgary Wild	(Canada) Northern Super League	1
Jon Brady	Port Vale	(England) League Two	4
Luke Casserly	Auckland FC (OFC)	(New Zealand) OFC Pro League	1
Ben Cahn	Solomon Islands	(Solomon Islands) FIFA	1
Ben Cahn	Solomon Kings	(Solomon Islands) OFC Pro League	1
Peter Cklamovski	Salford City	(England) League Two	4
Steve Corica	Yokohama F Marinos	(Japan) J1 League	1
Arthur Diles	Cong An Ho Chi Minh City	(Vietnam) V.League 1	1
Aaron Downes	Hereford	(England) National League North	6
Mehmet Durakovic	Star City	Malaysia Super League	1
Wael Gharzeddine	Lebanon women	(Lebanon) FIFA	1
Ian Gillan	Thiruvanathapuram Kombans	(India) Super League Kerala	N/A
Giancarlo Italiano	Lee Man	Hong Kong Premier League	1
Mirko Jeličić	Lokomotiv Tashkent	Uzbekistan Super League	1
Harry Kewell	Hanoi FC	(Vietnam) V.League 1	1
Anthony Limbrick	Loudoun United	(United States) USL Championship	2
Garrath McPherson	Philippines U23	(Philippines) FIFA	2
Ante Milicic	China women	(China) FIFA	1
Nick Montgomery	Beijing Guoan	(China) Chinese Super League	1
Warren Moon	Visakha FC	(Cambodia) Cambodian Premier League	1
Kevin Muscat	Shanghai Port	(China) Chinese Super League	1
Tanya Oxtoby	Newcastle United	(England) Women's Super League 2	2
Arthur Papas	Al-Ettifaq	(Saudi Arabia) Saudi Pro League	1
Gary Phillips	Bhutan	(Bhutan) FIFA	1
Ange Postecoglou	Al-Nassr	(Saudi Arabia) Saudi Pro League	1
Matt Ross	Chinese Taipei	(Chinese Taipei) FIFA	1
Alex Smith	Brooklyn FC	(United States) USL Super League	1
Alen Stajcic	Indonesia women	(Indonesia) FIFA	1
Mark Torcaso	Philippines women	(Philippines) FIFA	1

== Honours ==
=== John Aloisi ===
(China) Chengdu Rongcheng

- Chinese Super League: Runner-up 2026

=== Graham Arnold ===
Iraq

- Kings Cup: 2025

=== Jon Brady ===
(England) Brackley Town

- Southern Premier Division: 2011–12

(England) Northampton Town

- EFL League Two third-place promotion: 2022–23

=== Luke Casserly ===
(New Zealand) Auckland FC

- OFC Professional League: 2026.

=== Steve Corica ===
(New Zealand) Auckland FC

- A-League: Premiership 2024–25
- A-League: Championship 2025-26

=== Jean-Paul de Marigny ===
(Malaysia) Sabah

- Malaysia FA Cup: Runner-up 2025.

=== Mehmet Durakovic ===
(Malaysia) Selangor

- M-League: Runner-up 2014, 2015
- Malaysia Cup: 2015

(Malaysia) Perak

- M-League: Runner-up 2018
- Malaysia FA Cup: Runner-up 2019
- Malaysia Cup: 2018

=== Wael Gharzeddine ===
(Lebanon) SAS

- Lebanese Women's Football League: 2014–15, 2015–16
- Lebanese Women's FA Cup: 2013–14, 2014–15

(Jordan) Etihad

- Jordan Women's Pro League: 2023; Runner-up 2022
- Jordan Women's Cup: Runner-up: 2022

Lebanon

- WAFF Women's Championship: Third place: 2019

=== Ian Gillan ===
(Nepal) Lalitpur City

- Nepal Super League: 2023

(India) Calicut FC

- Super League Kerala: 2024

=== Mirko Jeličić ===
(Uzbekistan) Locomotiv Tashkent

- Uzbekistan Pro League: 2025

=== Harry Kewell ===
(Japan) Yokohama F Marinos

- AFC Champions League: Runner-up 2023–24.

=== Anthony Limbrick ===
(Wales) The New Saints

- Cymru Premier: 2021–22
- Welsh Cup: 2021−22

=== Joe Montemurro ===
(England) Arsenal Women

- FA Women's Super League: Champion 2018–19, Runner-up 2019–20.
- FA Women's League Cup: Champion 2017–18; Runner-up 2018–19; 2019–20
- FA Women's Cup : Runner-up 2017–18, 2020–21

(Italy) Juventus Women

- Serie A: Champion 2021–22; Runner-up 2022–23
- Coppa Italia: Champion 2021–22, 2022–23
- Supercoppa Italiana Champion 2021–22, 2023–24; Runner-up: 2022–23

(France) Lyon Women

- Première Ligue: Champion 2024–25

=== Nick Montgomery ===
(China) Beijing Guoan

- Chinese FA Super Cup: 2026

=== Kevin Muscat ===
(Japan) Yokohama F Marinos

- J1 League: 2022
- J1 League Runner-up: 2021, 2023
- Japanese Super Cup: 2023

(China) Shanghai Port

- Chinese Super League: 2024, 2025
- Chinese FA Cup: 2024

=== Ange Postecoglou ===
(Japan) Yokohama F Marinos

- J1 League: 2019
- J League Cup: Runner-up 2018
- Japanese Super Cup: Runner-up 2020

(Scotland) Celtic

- Scottish Premiership: 2021–22, 2022–23
- Scottish Cup: 2022–23
- Scottish League Cup: 2021–22, 2022–23

(England) Tottenham Hotspur

- UEFA Europa League: 2024–25

=== Zayid Ramsay ===
(Singapore) Geylang International

- FAS Premier League: 1988

=== Alen Stajcic ===
Philippines women's national football team

- AFF Women's Championship: 2022
- South-East Asian Games: Bronze 2021

=== Darren Stewart ===
(Singapore) Balestier Khalsa

- Singapore League Cup: 2013; 2012 (Plate)

=== Mark Torcaso ===
Philippines women's national football team

- South-East Asian Games: Gold 2025

=== Aurelio Vidmar ===
(Thailand) BG Pathum United

- Thailand Champions Cup: 2021

=== Ken Worden ===
(Malaysia) Selangor

- Malaysia FA Cup: 1991
- Malaysia Cup: 1995, 1996, 2002
- Charity Shield: 1996, 2002
