= Aya Jamal-Eddine =

Lebanese footballer (born 1997)

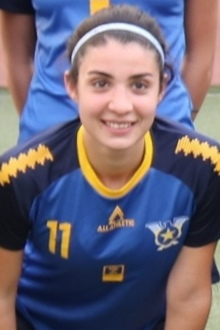
- Jamal-Eddine with Safa in 2020

Personal information
- Full name: Aya Salah Jamal-Eddine
- Date of birth: 11 October 1997 (age 29)
- Place of birth: Beirut, Lebanon
- Position: Defender

Youth career
- 2011–2014: SAS

Senior career*
Years	Team	Apps	(Gls)
2014–2015	SAS		
2015–2016	Akhaa Ahli Aley		
2016–2018	AUST (futsal)		
2017–2019	SAS		
2019–2022	Safa	16	(1)
2023	BFA	2	(0)

International career
2014	Lebanon U19		
2017–2021	Lebanon	14	(0)
2018	Lebanon (futsal)	3	(0)
Medal record
Women's football
Representing Lebanon
WAFF Women's Championship
Bronze medal – third place	2019
- * Club domestic league appearances and goals

Aya Salah Jamal-Eddine (Arabic: آية صلاح جمال الدين; born 11 October 1997) is a Lebanese former footballer who played as a defender.

== Early life ==
Jamal-Eddine was born in Beirut, Lebanon, andmoved to Australia at an early age. Growing up there, she participated in several sports, including Australian rules football and cricket. She returned to Lebanon at the age of 13.

== Club career ==
After returning to Lebanon, Jamal-Eddine joined Stars Association for Sports (SAS), where she initially trained with the boys' team because the academy did not yet have a women's section. Once the women's team was established in 2014, she played in the Lebanese Women's Football League, before moving to Akhaa Ahli Aley the next season. Jamal-Eddine returned to SAS in April 2017.

In August 2019, she joined Safa. She scored one goal in eight league appearances during the 2019–20 season. She remained with Safa until 2022, subsequently joining Beirut Football Academy in April 2023.

== International career ==
Jamal-Eddine represented Lebanon at under-19 level in 2014 and was included in the squad for the qualifying tournament for the 2015 AFC U-19 Women's Championship.

She made her senior debut for Lebanon in a friendly against Syria on 21 March 2017. She was part of the squad that finished third at the 2019 WAFF Women's Championship, appearing in all four of Lebanon's matches.

Jamal-Eddine subsequently represented Lebanon at the 2021 Arab Women's Cup, where she played in all three of the team's matches, and in the 2022 AFC Women's Asian Cup qualification campaign, appearing in all three group matches.

Jamal-Eddine was selected for Lebanon's squad at the 2018 AFC Women's Futsal Championship in Thailand.

== Personal life ==
Jamal-Eddine studied education and obtained a teaching degree. In 2020, she was pursuing an MBA in sports management. She also worked as a teaching intern and football coach.

== Honours ==
SAS

- Lebanese Women's Football League: 2014–15, 2018–19
- Lebanese Women's FA Cup: 2014–15, 2018–19; runner-up: 2017–18
- Lebanese Women's Super Cup runner-up: 2017, 2018

Safa

- Lebanese Women's Football League: 2020–21

Lebanon

- WAFF Women's Championship third place: 2019

== See also ==
- List of Lebanon women's international footballers
