= Mira Hoteit =

Lebanese footballer (born 2000)

- Hoteit with Safa in 2021

Personal information
- Full name: Mira Hassan Hoteit
- Date of birth: 20 September 2000 (age 26)
- Place of birth: Nabatieh, Lebanon
- Position: Full-back

Team information
- Current team: London Bees
- Number: 2

Senior career*
Years	Team	Apps	(Gls)
2016–2017	GFA		
2017–2019	Zouk Mosbeh		
2019–2022	Safa	24	(0)
2022–2024	London Seaward		
2024–	London Bees		

International career^{‡}
2018	Lebanon U19	3	(0)
2018–2025	Lebanon	14	(0)
Medal record
Women's football
Representing Lebanon
WAFF Women's Championship
Bronze medal – third place	2019
- * Club domestic league appearances and goals as of 12:17, 3 August 2024 (UTC) ‡ National team caps and goals as of 19 July 2025

Mira Hassan Hoteit (Arabic: ميرا حسن حطيط; born 20 September 2000) is a Lebanese footballer who plays as a full-back for English club London Bees.

== Club career ==
Born in Nabatieh, Lebanon, Hoteit began playing organised football at age 15 after enjoying casual games with her older brother. She played for several teams in the Lebanese Women's Football League, starting at GFA, before joining Zouk Mosbeh in 2017, and then Safa in 2019.

Hoteit left Lebanon to pursue her studies at University College London in 2021. She joined London Seaward in the FA Women's National League Division One South East (fourth tier) ahead of the 2022–23 season. Hoteit played 19 games during the 2023–24 season, scoring twice and getting one assist.

After two seasons, Hoteit moved to fellow Division One South East side London Bees ahead of the 2024–25 season. She was featured as one of several part-time players taking part in the 2024–25 Women's FA Cup fourth round. Hoteit played 24 games in all competitions, scoring three goals and getting five assists in the process. In May 2025, London Bees extended her contract for a further season.

== Personal life ==
Hoteit moved to the United Kingdom in 2021 to study bioscience entrepreneurship at University College London. As of 2025, she works for nsave, a fintech company that facilitates digital banking in unstable economies like Lebanon. Hoteit balances full-time work and football: she starts her day at 7 am and sometimes finishes as late as 11 pm.

== Honours ==
Zouk Mosbeh

- Lebanese Women's FA Cup runner-up: 2018–19

Safa

- Lebanese Women's Football League: 2020–21

Lebanon

- WAFF Women's Championship third place: 2019

== See also ==
- List of Lebanon women's international footballers
