= 2016–17 Lebanese Women's Football League =

Football tournament season

Lebanese Women's Football League
- Season: 2016–17
- Dates: 23 April – 28 July 2017
- Champions: SAS; 3rd title
- Matches: 40
- Goals: 329 (8.23 per match)
- Top goalscorer: Nancy Tchaylian (20 goals)
- Biggest win: GFA 20–0 Sporting High (1 May 2017)
- Highest scoring: GFA 20–0 Sporting High (1 May 2017)

The 2016–17 Lebanese Women's Football League was the 10th edition of the Lebanese Women's Football League since it was formed in 2008. Two-time defending champions SAS won their third title.

This was the first season to split the tournament into two phases. In the regular season, the top three teams of each group qualify for the championship round. The first-placed team are crowned champions.

== Regular season ==
=== Group A ===
Pos	Team	Pld	W	D	L	GF	GA	GD	Pts	Qualification
1	Zouk Mosbeh	5	5	0	0	32	2	+30	15	Qualification to the championship round
2	GFA	5	4	0	1	33	5	+28	12	Qualification to the championship round
3	ÓBerytus	5	2	1	2	19	5	+14	7	Qualification to the championship round
4	Sporting High	5	2	0	3	4	42	−38	6	
5	BFA	5	1	1	3	11	8	+3	4	
6	FC Beirut	5	0	0	5	1	38	−37	0	

Source: Global Sports Archive

=== Group B ===
Pos	Team	Pld	W	D	L	GF	GA	GD	Pts	Qualification
1	SAS	4	4	0	0	33	4	+29	12	Qualification to the championship round
2	Salam Zgharta	4	3	0	1	18	5	+13	9	Qualification to the championship round
3	Akhaa Ahli Aley	4	2	0	2	25	8	+17	6	Qualification to the championship round
4	United Tripoli	4	1	0	3	9	13	−4	3	
5	Nasr Hadath	4	0	0	4	0	55	−55	0	

Source: Global Sports Archive

== Championship round ==
Pos	Team	Pld	W	D	L	GF	GA	GD	Pts	Qualification
1	SAS	10	9	1	0	44	4	+40	28	Champions
2	Zouk Mosbeh	10	8	1	1	50	6	+44	25	
3	Salam Zgharta	10	6	0	4	31	17	+14	18	
4	Akhaa Ahli Aley	10	2	2	6	7	34	−27	8	
5	ÓBerytus	10	1	2	7	6	25	−19	5	
6	GFA	10	0	2	8	6	58	−52	2	

Source: Global Sports Archive

== See also ==
- 2016–17 Lebanese Women's FA Cup
- 2016–17 Lebanese Women's Super Cup
