= Samira Awad =

Lebanese footballer (born 2000)

- Awad with Safa in 2021

Personal information
- Full name: Samira Mohamad Awad
- Date of birth: 30 June 2000 (age 26)
- Place of birth: Haret Hreik, Lebanon
- Position: Winger

Youth career
- 2013–2016: Nasr Hadath
- 2016–2018: ÓBerytus

Senior career*
| Years | Team | Apps | (Gls) |
| 2018–2019 | ÓBerytus | | (4) |
| 2019–2022 | Safa | 25 | (19) |
| 2023–2024 | SAS | 15 | (12) |
| Total | | 40+ | (35) |

International career
| 2014–2019 | Lebanon U19 | 6 | (3) |
| 2018–2024 | Lebanon | 27 | (5) |
Medal record
Women's football
Representing Lebanon
WAFF Women's Championship
| Bronze medal – third place | 2019 |
WAFF U-18 Women's Championship
| Silver medal – second place | 2018 | U-18 Team |
Arab U-17 Women's Cup
| Gold medal – first place | 2015 | U-17 Team |
- * Club domestic league appearances and goals

Samira Mohamad Awad (Arabic: سميرة محمد عوض; born 30 June 2000) is a Lebanese former footballer who played as a winger.

Coming through the youth system, Awad made her senior debut for ÓBerytus in 2018. She then moved to Safa, winning the 2022 WAFF Women's Clubs Championship. Internationally, she won the 2015 Arab U-17 Women's Cup with Lebanon U17, and made her debut with the senior team in 2018.

== Club career ==
Awad started playing on the streets, and was noticed by Nasr Hadath's coach. She signed to the club's under-15s in 2013, and progressed through the youth system. After the club folded, she signed for ÓBerytus in 2016.

Awad joined Safa in 2019; she scored 13 goals and made 11 assists in 14 games in the 2019–20 season. She helped the team lift the 2022 WAFF Women's Clubs Championship title. After Safa's dissolution in 2022, Awad initially decided to retire from football due to conflicts with her work schedule.

== International career ==
Awad participated in the 2015 AFC U-19 Women's Championship qualification with Lebanon U19 in November 2014. In February 2015, she won the 2015 Arab U-17 Women's Cup with Lebanon U17. She helped the U19 team qualify to the second round of qualification for the 2019 AFC U-19 Women's Championship.

On 18 July 2023, Awad scored a brace in a 5–0 friendly win against Palestine. She was called up to the 2024 WAFF Women's Championship.

== Personal life ==
Awad is Muslim and wears the hijab. She stated that her family was supportive and encouraged her to play football.

She graduated in computer science from University of Sciences and Arts in Lebanon (USAL). She subsequently worked as a software engineer for a multinational company.

== Career statistics ==
=== International ===
Scores and results list Lebanon's goal tally first, score column indicates score after each Awad goal.

List of international goals scored by Samira Awad
| No. | Date | Venue | Opponent | Score | Result | Competition |
|---|---|---|---|---|---|---|
| 1 | 9 January 2019 | Al Muharraq Stadium, Muharraq, Bahrain | United Arab Emirates | 2–0 | 2–0 | 2019 WAFF Championship |
| 2 | 15 January 2019 | Al Muharraq Stadium, Muharraq, Bahrain | Palestine | 3–0 | 3–0 | 2019 WAFF Championship |
| 3 | 18 July 2023 | Ansar Stadium, Ansar, Lebanon | Palestine | 1–0 | 5–0 | Friendly |
| 4 | 18 July 2023 | Ansar Stadium, Ansar, Lebanon | Palestine | 2–0 | 5–0 | Friendly |
| 5 | 21 September 2023 | King Fahd Sports City, Taif, Saudi Arabia | Bhutan | 2–0 | 3–2 | 2023 SAFF Friendly Tournament |

== Honours ==
Safa

- Lebanese Women's Football League: 2020–21
- WAFF Women's Clubs Championship: 2022

SAS

- Lebanese Women's Football League: 2022–23

Lebanon U17

- Arab U-17 Women's Cup: 2015

Lebanon U18

- WAFF U-18 Women's Championship runner-up: 2018

Lebanon

- WAFF Women's Championship third place: 2019

== See also ==
- List of Lebanon women's international footballers
