= Dima Al Kasti =

Lebanese footballer (born 2001)

- Al Kasti with Safa in 2021

Personal information
- Full name: Dima Hani Al Kasti
- Date of birth: 13 December 2001 (age 24)
- Place of birth: Beirut, Lebanon
- Positions: Left-back; left winger

Team information
- Current team: No Limits
- Number: 3

Senior career*
Years	Team	Apps	(Gls)
2016–2019	Akhaa Ahli Aley		(13)
2019–2022	Safa	42	(10)
2022	SAS	0	(0)
2022–2023	Al Hilal	12	(1)
2023–2024	SAS	18	(5)
2024–	No Limits	15	(3)
2025–2026	→ Orthodox (loan)		

International career^{‡}
2018–2019	Lebanon U19	5	(0)
2019–	Lebanon	34	(5)
Medal record
Women's football
Representing Lebanon
WAFF Women's Championship
Silver medal – second place	2022
Bronze medal – third place	2019
WAFF U-18 Women's Championship
Silver medal – second place	2018	U-18 Team
- * Club domestic league appearances and goals as of 28 June 2026 ‡ National team caps and goals as of 28 November 2025

Dima Hani Al Kasti (Arabic: ديما هاني الكاستي; born 13 December 2001) is a Lebanese footballer who plays as a left-back or left winger for Lebanese club No Limits and the Lebanon national team.

== Club career ==
Al Kasti joined Safa in 2019; she scored four goals and made six assists in 14 games in the 2019–20 season. On 5 September 2022, Al Kasti moved to reigning champions SAS. Only one month later, she moved to Al Hilal ahead of the 2022–23 Saudi Women's Premier League.

On 15 August 2025, Al Kasti was loaned out by No Limits to Jordanian club Orthodox.

== International career ==
On 30 August 2021, Al Kasti scored a brace for Lebanon in a 5–1 win against Sudan in the 2021 Arab Women's Cup. She was called up to represent Lebanon at the 2022 WAFF Women's Championship, helping her side finish runners-up. She was called up to the 2024 WAFF Women's Championship.

== Career statistics ==
=== International ===
Scores and results list Lebanon's goal tally first, score column indicates score after each Al Kasti goal.

List of international goals scored by Dima Al Kasti
No.	Date	Venue	Opponent	Score	Result	Competition
1	7 January 2019	Shaikh Ali Bin Mohammed Stadium, Muharraq, Bahrain	Bahrain	2–3	2–3	2019 WAFF Championship
2	30 August 2021	Police Academy Stadium, Cairo, Egypt	Sudan	1–0	5–1	2021 Arab Cup
3	30 August 2021	Police Academy Stadium, Cairo, Egypt	Sudan	3–0	5–1	2021 Arab Cup
4	15 February 2024	Safa Stadium, Beirut, Lebanon	Syria	3–0	3–1	Friendly
5	7 April 2025	Fouad Chehab Stadium, Jounieh, Lebanon	Comoros	1–0	4–0	Friendly

== Honours ==
Safa

- WAFF Women's Clubs Championship: 2022
- Lebanese Women's Football League: 2020–21

No Limits

- Lebanese Women's Football League: 2025–26

Lebanon U18

- WAFF U-18 Women's Championship runner-up: 2018

Lebanon

- WAFF Women's Championship runner-up: 2022; third place: 2019

== See also ==
- List of Lebanon women's international footballers
