= Wael Gharzeddine =

Football coach (born 1978)

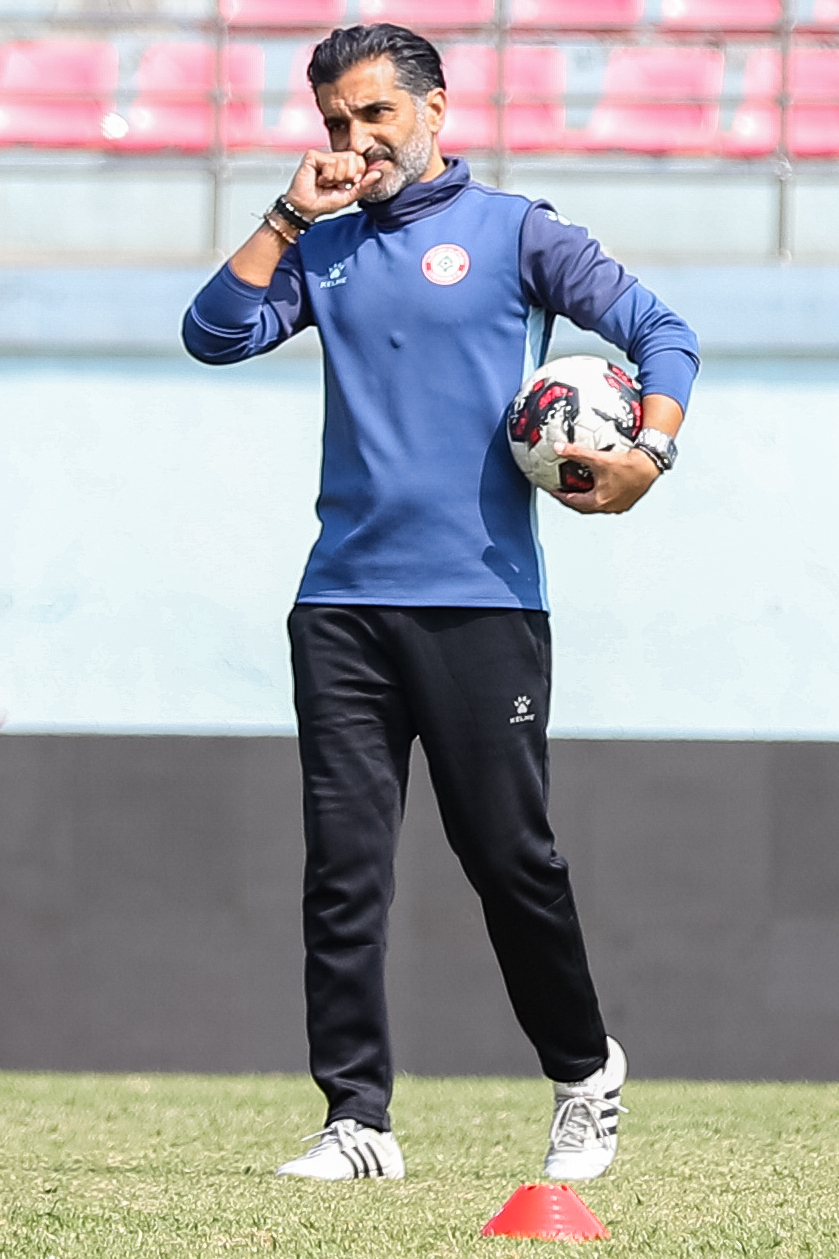
- Gharzeddine coaching Lebanon in 2025

Personal information
- Full name: Wael Gharzeddine
- Date of birth: 3 February 1978 (age 48)
- Place of birth: Ras el-Matn, Lebanon

Team information
- Current team: Lebanon women (head coach)

Managerial career
- Years: Team
- 2005: Bentleigh Greens (youth)
- 2006: South Melbourne FC (women)
- 2006–2008: Australian Football Skool (technical director)
- 2006–2008: Football Federation Victoria (state team)
- 2008–2010: Atlético Mineiro (youth coach)
- 2010–2011: UE Cornellà U14
- 2011–2013: South Melbourne FC U18
- 2012–2013: Bentleigh Greens SC (technical consultant)
- 2014–2016: SAS (women)
- 2017–2022: Lebanon (women)
- 2018–2019: Lebanon U19 (women)
- 2022–2023: Etihad (women)
- 2024–: Lebanon (women)
Medal record
Women's football
Representing Lebanon (as manager)
WAFF Women's Championship
Bronze medal – third place	2019

Wael Gharzeddine (Arabic: وائل غرز الدين; born 3 February 1978) is a football coach who is the head coach of the Lebanon women's national team. Born in Lebanon, Gharzeddine moved to Australia at an early age and holds dual citizenship.

== Career ==
=== Early career ===
Beginning his coaching career in Australia, Gharzeddine moved to Brazil where he coached the youth teams of Atletico Mineiro and Fluminense. He then moved to Spain, coaching UE Cornellà's U14 team, before moving to Lebanon, where he coached SAS in the Lebanese Women's Football League between 2014 and 2016, winning two league titles and a cup.

=== Lebanon ===
In 2017, Gharzeddine became the head coach of the Lebanon women's national team. He finished in third place in the 2019 WAFF Women's Championship. Under his management, the national team made the biggest jump in points in the FIFA ranking of December 2021, mainly due to ranking best second in the 2022 AFC Women's Asian Cup Qualifiers. In February 2022, he resigned as head coach of the Lebanon women's national team.

Gharzeddine also coached the Lebanon women's national under-19 team between 2018 and 2019, finishing as runner-up in the 2018 WAFF U-18 Women's Championship. That national team made a 22-place jump in the AFC ranking to reach the 12th place in Asia.

=== Etihad ===
On 22 February 2022, Gharzeddine was appointed head coach of Jordan Women's Pro League side Etihad, section of the 6 Yard Football Academy. In his first year with the club, he led the team to second-place finishes in the league and the cup in the club's debut season.

He started his second season winning the first four games, scoring 18 goals and conceding two. With the club sitting in first place with 17 points, Gharzeddine left Etihad on 1 August 2023, upon the expiration of his contract.

=== Return to Lebanon ===
In 2024, Gharzeddine was re-appointed head coach of the Lebanon women's national team.

== Personal life ==
Born in Ras el-Matn, Lebanon, Gharzeddine holds both Lebanese and Australian citizenship.

== Managerial statistics ==
As of 13 October 2026

Managerial record by club and tenure
Team	From	To	Record				
Team	From	To	M	W	D	L	Win %
SAS	March 2014	October 2016	31	25	4	2	80.65
Lebanon	March 2017	February 2022	16	6	1	9	37.50
Etihad	February 2022	August 2023	23	15	4	4	65.22
Lebanon	February 2024	present	21	10	3	8	47.62
Total			91	56	12	23	61.54

== Honours ==
Atlético Mineiro

- Taça Belo Horizonte de Juniores: 2009

Australian Football Skool

- Institute Cup U-19: 2010

SAS

- Lebanese Women's Football League: 2014–15, 2015–16
- Lebanese Women's FA Cup: 2013–14, 2014–15

Etihad

- Jordan Women's Pro League: 2023; runner-up: 2022
- Jordan Women's Cup runner-up: 2022

Lebanon U19

- WAFF U-18 Girls Championship runner-up: 2018

Lebanon

- WAFF Women's Championship third place: 2019
