= Aya Chiry =

Lebanese footballer (born 1986)

Personal information
- Date of birth: 4 April 1986 (age 40)
- Place of birth: Beirut, Lebanon
- Position: Midfielder

Senior career*
| Years | Team | Apps | (Gls) |
- Sadaka
- Athletico Beirut
- * Club domestic league appearances and goals

Aya Chiry (Arabic: آية شيري; born 4 April 1986) is a Lebanese former footballer who played for the Lebanon national football team as a defensive midfielder.

== Career ==
Chiry started playing basketball at the age of fourteen and reached a high level before succumbing to multiple injuries in 2011, at which point she focused on football. She founded Lebanese side Girls Football Academy (Fatat Academy) with Lebanese footballers Nadia Assaf and Karen Haddad.

== Personal life ==
Outside of futsal, Chiry received a bachelor's degree in chemistry and a Master of Business Administration in marketing. She also worked for Obagi, an American medical cosmetics company.
