= Alice Kusi =

Ghanaian footballer

Personal information
- Full name: Alice Kusi
- Date of birth: 12 January 1995 (age 31)
- Place of birth: Ghana
- Position: Midfielder

Team information
- Current team: Al Ahli SFC

Senior career*
Years	Team	Apps	(Gls)
2016–2017	Fabulous Ladies		
2017–2018	Zouk Mosbeh	18	(29)
2018–2019	Fabulous Ladies		
2019–2020	Shabab Al-Ordon		
2020	Safa	7	(13)
2021–2023	Spartak Subotica		
2023–	Al Ahli SFC		

International career
2016–	Ghana	5	(0)
- * Club domestic league appearances and goals

Alice Kusi (born 12 January 1995) is a Ghanaian footballer who plays as a midfielder for the Ghana national team. She competed for Ghana at the 2018 Africa Women Cup of Nations, playing in three matches.

== Club career ==
Starting her career in Ghana at Fabulous Ladies, Kusi moved to Lebanese-based Zouk Mosbeh in 2017 one a one-year contract. In her only season in Lebanon, she won the league, cup and Super Cup, and was crowned top scorer of the league. Kusi returned to Fabulous Ladies in 2018 for one year.

On 27 May 2019, Kusi moved to Jordanian champions Shabab Al-Ordon on a one-year contract. She won the inaugural edition of the WAFF Women's Clubs Championship as the tournament's top goalscorer, with nine goals in four matches.

On 17 January 2020, Kusi returned to Lebanon, signing for Safa mid-2019–20 season. She scored a hat-trick for her new club just three days later, against Stars of South in a 5–0 victory. Kusi ended the season with 13 goals in seven appearances, helping her side come second in the league.

She joined Serbian club Spartak Subotica ahead of the 2021–22 season, featuring in the UEFA Women's Champions League.

== Honours ==
Zouk Mosbeh

- Lebanese Women's Football League: 2017–18
- Lebanese Women's FA Cup: 2017–18
- Lebanese Women's Super Cup: 2018

Shabab Al-Ordon

- WAFF Women's Clubs Championship: 2019

Individual

- WAFF Women's Clubs Championship top goalscorer: 2019
- Lebanese Women's Football League top goalscorer: 2017–18
