= 2020–21 Lebanese Women's Football League =

Football tournament season

Lebanese Women's Football League
- Season: 2020–21
- Dates: 23 May – 11 July 2021
- Champions: Safa; 1st title
- WAFF Championship: Safa
- Matches: 40
- Goals: 244 (6.1 per match)
- Top goalscorer: Syntia Salha (13 goals)
- Best goalkeeper: Perla Nasr (5 clean sheets)

The 2020–21 Lebanese Women's Football League was the 14th edition of the Lebanese Women's Football League since it was formed in 2008.

It began on 23 May 2021, and 11 teams are participating, divided into a group of five and a group of six. Safa won their first title, after beating ÓBerytus 6–1 in the final matchday of the season.

== League table ==
=== Group A ===
Pos	Team	Pld	W	D	L	GF	GA	GD	Pts	Qualification
1	EFP	4	3	1	0	27	4	+23	10	Qualification to the final six
2	Safa	4	3	0	1	28	3	+25	9	Qualification to the final six
3	BFA	4	2	1	1	18	7	+11	7	Qualification to the final six
4	United Tripoli	4	1	0	3	5	34	−29	3	
5	Montada North Lebanon	4	0	0	4	4	34	−30	0	

Source: Global Sports Archive
Rules for classification: 1) Points; 2) Goal difference; 3) Number of goals scored

=== Group B ===
Pos	Team	Pld	W	D	L	GF	GA	GD	Pts	Qualification
1	SAS	5	5	0	0	47	0	+47	15	Qualification to the final six
2	Super Girls	5	4	0	1	28	10	+18	12	Qualification to the final six
3	ÓBerytus	5	3	0	2	16	11	+5	9	Qualification to the final six
4	Sakafi Chhim	5	2	0	3	14	25	−11	6	
5	Taadod Mazraat Chouf	5	1	0	4	4	19	−15	3	
6	Primo	5	0	0	5	5	49	−44	0	

Source: Global Sports Archive
Rules for classification: 1) Points; 2) Goal difference; 3) Number of goals scored

== Final six ==
Pos	Team	Pld	W	D	L	GF	GA	GD	Pts	Qualification
1	Safa (C)	5	4	1	0	17	2	+15	13	Qualification for the WAFF Clubs Championship
2	EFP	5	3	1	1	12	3	+9	10	
3	SAS	5	2	3	0	7	5	+2	9	
4	BFA	5	2	1	2	7	12	−5	7	
5	ÓBerytus	5	1	0	4	4	13	−9	3	
6	Super Girls	5	0	0	5	1	13	−12	0	

Source: Global Sports Archive
Rules for classification: 1) Points; 2) Goal difference; 3) Number of goals scored
(C) Champions

== Top goalscorers ==
Rank	Player	Club	Goals
1	(Lebanon) Syntia Salha	Safa	13
2	(Lebanon) Christy Maalouf	EFP	12
3	(Lebanon) Sally Mjarkach	Sakafi Chhim	9
3	(Lebanon) Nancy Tchaylian	SAS	9
5	(Lebanon) Jana Korjieh	Super Girls	8
5	(Lebanon) Yara Srour	BFA	8
5	(Lebanon) Hanin Tamim	SAS	8
8	(Lebanon) Rana Al Mokdad	SAS	7
8	(Lebanon) Sara Bakri	BFA	7
8	(Lebanon) Rachel Nassif	Safa	7

== See also ==
- 2020–21 Lebanese Women's FA Cup
