= List of women's football clubs in Lebanon =

In Lebanon, there is only one women's football league: the Lebanese Women's Football League. Thus, there are no promotions or relegation to date.

== Clubs ==
=== Current ===
The following clubs are in the Lebanese Women's Football League for the 2025–26 season. The years in parentheses represent the years of participation.

- BFA (2017–2026)
- EFP (2020–2026)
- Jounieh (2025–2026)
- Jwaya (2026)
- Mawadda Tripoli (2026)
- Nejmeh (2026)
- No Limits (2024–2026)
- Safa Saad Barouk (2026)
- Sanharib (2026)

=== Former ===
The following clubs used to play in the Lebanese Women's Football League at one point. The years in parentheses represent the years of participation.

- Adab W Riyada Kfarchima (2008–2010)
- Akhaa Ahli Aley (2017–2020; 2024)
- Ansar (2008–2009)
- Arabi (2011–2015)
- Athletico Beirut (2011–2013)
- FC Beirut (2011–2017; 2023–2024)
- Girls (2012–2017)
- Helium (2020; 2023–2024)
- Homenmen (2008–2009)
- Hoops (2019–2020)
- Jabal (2023)
- Jabal Sheikh (2018–2019)
- Kfarchima (2019–2020)
- Montada North Lebanon (2020–2021)
- Nasr Hadath (2017)
- ÓBerytus (2017–2025)
- Phoenicia (2012)
- Primo (2020–2021)
- Sadaka (2008–2014)
- Safa (2020–2022)
- Sakafi Chhim (2019–2021)
- Salam Zgharta (2016–2020; 2024–2025)
- SAS (2014–2024)
- Shabab Arabi (2008–2012)
- Shabab Tripoli (2008–2010)
- Shooters (2011–2013)
- Southern Stars (Note: Terdeba Stars in 2019, Southern Stars in 2020, Montada Sour Sakafi in 2023) (2019–2020; 2024–2025)
- Sporting High (2017–2019)
- Super Girls (2020–2024)
- Taadod Mazraat Chouf (2021–2022)
- United Tripoli (2014–2015; 2017–2022)
- Zouk Mosbeh (2017–2019)

== See also ==
- List of football clubs in Lebanon
- Women's football in Lebanon
- List of women's football teams
- List of women's national football teams
- International competitions in women's association football
