= 2024–25 Lebanese Women's Football League =

Football tournament season

Lebanese Women's Football League
- Season: 2024–25
- Dates: 26 January – 10 May 2025
- Champions: BFA; 2nd title
- WAFF Championship: BFA
- Matches: 27
- Goals: 72 (2.67 per match)
- Top goalscorer: Nancy Tchaylian (8 goals)
- Biggest win: BFA 6–0 FC Beirut (26 January 2025)
- Highest scoring: ÓBerytus 5–2 Salam Zgharta (9 March 2025)

The 2024–25 Lebanese Women's Football League was the 18th edition of the Lebanese Women's Football League since it was formed in 2008.

BFA won their second consecutive title after defeating Jounieh 3–1. Nancy Tchaylian finished top scorer with eight goals, helping ÓBerytus to a second-place finish.

== Regular season ==
| Pos | Team | Pld | W | D | L | GF | GA | GD | Pts | Qualification (Note: Teams played each other once in the first phase (6 matches). In the second phase, the top four teams played each other once more (3 matches). Teams carried over half their point tally from the first phase into the second phase.) |
|---|---|---|---|---|---|---|---|---|---|---|
| 1 | BFA (C) | 9 | 5 | 4 | 0 | 17 | 4 | +13 | 14 | Qualification for the WAFF Clubs Championship group stage |
| 2 | ÓBerytus | 9 | 6 | 1 | 2 | 24 | 9 | +15 | 13 | |
| 3 | No Limits | 9 | 3 | 4 | 2 | 10 | 6 | +4 | 8 | |
| 4 | Jounieh | 9 | 3 | 1 | 5 | 10 | 14 | −4 | 5 | |
| 5 | EFP | 6 | 2 | 2 | 2 | 6 | 9 | −3 | 8 | |
| 6 | FC Beirut | 6 | 1 | 1 | 4 | 1 | 16 | −15 | 4 | |
| 7 | Salam Zgharta | 6 | 0 | 1 | 5 | 4 | 14 | −10 | 1 | |
| 8 | Southern Stars | 0 | 0 | 0 | 0 | 0 | 0 | 0 | 0 | Withdraw |
| 9 | Akhaa Ahli Aley | 0 | 0 | 0 | 0 | 0 | 0 | 0 | 0 | Withdraw |

Source: Global Sports Archive
Rules for classification: 1) Points; 2) Head-to-head points; 3) Head-to-head goal difference; 4) Goal difference; 5) Goals scored; 6) Disciplinary points.
(C) Champions

== Season statistics ==
=== Top goalscorers ===
| Rank | Player | Club | Goals |
|---|---|---|---|
| 1 | (Lebanon) Nancy Tchaylian | ÓBerytus | 8 |
| 2 | (Lebanon) Waed Raed | ÓBerytus | 5 |
| 2 | (Lebanon) Lama Abdine | BFA | 5 |
| 4 | (Lebanon) Paula Karam | Jounieh | 3 |
| 4 | (Lebanon) Sara Issa | Jounieh | 3 |
| 4 | (Lebanon) Lynn Moutran | BFA | 3 |
| 4 | (Lebanon) Rachel Nassif | EFP | 3 |
| 4 | (Lebanon) Anji Saad | No Limits | 3 |

=== Most assists ===
| Rank | Player | Club | Assists |
|---|---|---|---|
| 1 | (Lebanon) Waed Raed | ÓBerytus | 4 |
| 2 | (Lebanon) Nancy Tchaylian | ÓBerytus | 3 |
| 3 | (Lebanon) Cecile Iskandar | EFP | 2 |
| 3 | (Lebanon) Lama Abdine | BFA | 2 |
| 3 | (Lebanon) Lea El Hajj Ali | BFA | 2 |
| 3 | (Lebanon) Ayana Rezkallah | EFP | 2 |
| 3 | (Lebanon) Haya Najjad | BFA | 2 |
| 3 | (Lebanon) Nour Kishly | No Limits | 2 |
