= Hamze =

Hamze is a surname. Notable people with the surname include:

- Darine Hamze (born 1978), Lebanese actress, director, and producer
- Jouana Hamze (born 1988), Lebanese footballer
- Kassem Hamzé (born 1950), Lebanese sprinter
- Mona Abou Hamze (born 1968), Lebanese television personality and presenter
