= 2007–08 Lebanese Women's Football League =

Football tournament season

Lebanese Women's Football League
- Season: 2007–08
- Dates: 1 June – 24 July 2008
- Champions: Sadaka; 1st title
- Matches: 25
- Goals: 240 (9.6 per match)
- Top goalscorer: Sarah Haidar (18 goals)
- Biggest win: Ansar 28–0 Shabab Tripoli (18 July 2008)
- Highest scoring: Ansar 28–0 Shabab Tripoli (18 July 2008)

The 2007–08 Lebanese Women's Football League was the first edition of the Lebanese Women's Football League. Sadaka won the competition's first title, with a 2–1 victory over Ansar in the final matchday of the season.

== League table ==
Pos	Team	Pld	W	D	L	GF	GA	GD	Pts	Qualification
1	Sadaka	9	8	1	0	90	7	+83	25	Champions
2	Ansar	9	7	1	1	78	6	+72	22	
3	Homenmen	9	4	0	5	49	16	+33	12	
4	Adab W Riyada Kfarchima	9	1	0	8	7	116	−109	3	
5	Shabab Tripoli	9	2	0	7	8	83	−75	−6	
6	Shabab Arabi	5	2	0	3	8	12	−4	−6	

Source: Global Sports Archive

=== Top goalscorers ===
Rank	Player	Club	Goals
1	(Lebanon) Sarah Haidar	Sadaka	18
2	(Lebanon) Sara Bakri	Sadaka	17
3	(Lebanon) Dima Krayyem	Ansar	15
3	(Armenia) Gayane Kostanyan	Homenmen	15
5	(Lebanon) Nancy Tchaylian	Ansar	11
5	(Nigeria) Aiyenugba Funke	Ansar	11
5	(Lebanon) Myriam Neaimeh	Ansar	11
5	(Lebanon) Saria Al Sayegh	Sadaka	11
9	(Lebanon) Iman Chaito	Ansar	10

== See also ==
- 2007–08 Lebanese Women's FA Cup
