= North Lebanon Stars =

Lebanese women's football club

- Full name: North Lebanon Stars
- Founded: 2019; 6 years ago, as Montada North Lebanon
- Chairman: Hamad Al Salem
| Home colours | Away colours |

North Lebanon Stars (Arabic: نجوم شمال لبنان) is a women's association football club based in Tripoli, Lebanon. Founded in 2019 as Montada North Lebanon, they competed in the Lebanese Women's Football League until the 2020–21 season.

== History ==
Founded in 2019, Montada North Lebanon finished in 4th place in Group B of the 2019–20, qualifying to the Final Eight round, where they finished in 8th place. On 22 June 2021, the club changed their name to North Lebanon Stars.

== See also ==
- Lebanese Women's Football League
- Women's football in Lebanon
- List of women's association football clubs in Lebanon
