= Nadia Assaf =

Lebanese footballer and coach (born 1985)

- Assaf with GFA

Personal information
- Full name: Nadia Walid Assaf
- Date of birth: 30 September 1985 (age 41)
- Place of birth: Dubai, United Arab Emirates
- Positions: Attacking midfielder; centre forward

Senior career*
Years	Team	Apps	(Gls)
2008–2009	Ansar		
2009–2011	Athletico		
2011–2017	GFA		
Total			(54)

International career
2008	Lebanon (futsal)	1+	(1)
2007–2013	Lebanon	7+	(5)
Medal record
Women's football
Representing Lebanon
WAFF Women's Championship
Bronze medal – third place	2007
- * Club domestic league appearances and goals

Nadia Assaf (Arabic: ناديا عساف; born 30 September 1985) is a Lebanese football coach and former player who played as a midfielder and forward. She represented Lebanon internationally in football and futsal. In 2011, she co-founded Girls Football Academy (GFA), a women's football academy in Beirut.

== Early life ==
Born in Dubai, United Arab Emirates, to a Lebanese Druze family, Assaf spent part of her childhood in Australia, where she began playing football.

She later studied at the American University of Beirut, where she obtained a bachelor's degree, before completing a master's degree in Sports Education and Development at the University of Bath in England.

== Club career ==
Upon returning to Lebanon, Assaf played for Ansar and Athletico Beirut in the Lebanese Women's Football League.

In 2011, Assaf co-founded Girls Football Academy (GFA) with Walid Arakji. The project emerged from their shared concerns about the limited resources and training opportunities available to female footballers in Lebanon. The academy aimed to provide girls with professional coaching and facilities, while developing players for the national team.

The academy began operating in October 2011, with training sessions held at the Al-Ansar Stadium in Beirut. Its programme included teams in several age categories, from under-nine players to a senior team competing in the Lebanese women's first division. By March 2013, GFA had more than 45 registered players distributed across several teams and age groups. The senior team finished as runners-up in the 2012 Lebanese women's championship.

Assaf also coached GFA's under-18 teams.

== International career ==
Assaf represented Lebanon in association football between 2007 and 2013. She scored twice at the 2007 WAFF Women's Championship, where Lebanon finished third, and once at the 2011 WAFF Women's Championship. At the 2014 AFC Women's Asian Cup qualification in June 2013, Assaf appeared in all three of Lebanon's matches and scored twice in a 12–1 victory over Kuwait.

In futsal, Assaf represented Lebanon at the 2008 WAFF Women's Futsal Championship, scoring once.

== Career statistics ==
=== International ===
Scores and results list Lebanon's goal tally first, score column indicates score after each Assaf goal.

List of international goals scored by Nadia Assaf
No.	Date	Venue	Opponent	Score	Result	Competition	Ref.
1	7 September 2007	Amman, Jordan	Syria		7–0	2007 WAFF Women's Championship	
2	7 September 2007	Amman, Jordan	Syria		7–0	2007 WAFF Women's Championship	
3	4 October 2011	Zayed Bin Sultan Stadium, Abu Dhabi, United Arab Emirates	Iran	1–1	1–8	2011 WAFF Women's Championship	
4	9 June 2013	Amman International Stadium, Amman, Jordan	Kuwait	2–0	12–1	2014 AFC Women's Asian Cup qualification	
5	9 June 2013	Amman International Stadium, Amman, Jordan	Kuwait	8–0	12–1	2014 AFC Women's Asian Cup qualification	

== Honours ==
Lebanon

- WAFF Women's Championship third place: 2007

Individual

- Lebanese Women's Football League top goalscorer: 2015–16

== See also ==
- List of Lebanon women's international footballers
