= 2013–14 Lebanese Women's Football League =

Football tournament season

Lebanese Women's Football League
- Season: 2013–14
- Dates: 28 May – 27 June 2014
- Champions: Sadaka; 7th title
- Matches: 28
- Goals: 143 (5.11 per match)
- Top goalscorer: Maysa Jbarah (25 goals)
- Biggest win: SAS 17–0 United Tripoli (22 June 2014)
- Highest scoring: SAS 17–0 United Tripoli (22 June 2014)

The 2013–14 Lebanese Women's Football League was the seventh edition of the Lebanese Women's Football League since its inception in 2008. Six-time defending champions Sadaka won their seventh title.

== League table ==
Pos	Team	Pld	W	D	L	GF	GA	GD	Pts	Qualification
1	Sadaka	10	9	1	0	64	3	+61	28	Champions
2	SAS	10	8	1	1	41	10	+31	25	
3	GFA	9	4	1	4	16	17	−1	13	
4	FC Beirut	9	2	2	5	9	19	−10	8	
5	Arabi	9	2	0	7	10	31	−21	6	
6	United Tripoli	9	0	1	8	3	63	−60	1	

Source: Global Sports Archive

== See also ==
- 2013–14 Lebanese Women's FA Cup
