= Super Girls FC =

Lebanese women's football club

Super Girls
- Full name: Super Girls Football Club
- Founded: 29 April 2019; 5 years ago
- Chairman: Sahar Dbouk
- Manager: Sahar Dbouk
- League: Lebanese Women's Football League
- 2023–24: Lebanese Women's Football League, withdrew
Home colours	Away colours

Super Girls Football Club (Arabic: نـادي سـوبـر غـيـرلـز) is a women's association football club based in Tyre, Lebanon. Founded in 2018, they compete in the Lebanese Women's Football League.

== History ==
Super Girls was established by Sahar Dbouk on 29 April 2019 as the first women's football academy in Southern Lebanon. Despite the Lebanese liquidity crisis, which began in that year, the club received support from the local community and UNIFIL who donated a team bus, and various football and medical equipment.

Super Girls made their debut in the 2019–20 Lebanese Women's Football League, finishing in 6th place in Group A. On 22 April 2023, the team withdrew from the 2022–23 season after the first matchday.

== See also ==
- Lebanese Women's Football League
- Women's football in Lebanon
- List of women's association football clubs in Lebanon
