= 2017–18 Lebanese Women's Football League =

Football tournament season

Lebanese Women's Football League
- Season: 2017–18
- Champions: Zouk Mosbeh; 1st title
- Matches: 42
- Goals: 311 (7.4 per match)
- Top goalscorer: Alice Kusi (26 goals)

The 2017–18 Lebanese Women's Football League was the 11th edition of the Lebanese Women's Football League since its inception in 2008. Zouk Mosbeh won their first title, with defending champions SAS coming second.

== League table ==
Pos	Team	Pld	W	D	L	GF	GA	GD	Pts	Qualification
1	Zouk Mosbeh	8	8	0	0	79	5	+74	24	Qualification to the final four
2	SAS	8	7	0	1	34	6	+28	21	Qualification to the final four
3	ÓBerytus	8	6	0	2	46	9	+37	18	Qualification to the final four
4	Akhaa Ahli Aley	8	4	1	3	32	12	+20	13	Qualification to the final four
5	Salam Zgharta	8	3	1	4	27	23	+4	10	
6	BFA	8	2	3	3	19	25	−6	9	
7	United Tripoli	8	2	1	5	19	30	−11	7	
8	Jabal Al-Shaykh	8	1	0	7	8	96	−88	3	
9	Sporting High	8	0	0	8	5	63	−58	0	

Source: Goalzz.com
Rules for classification: 1) Points; 2) Goal difference; 3) Number of goals scored

== Final four ==
Pos	Team	Pld	W	D	L	GF	GA	GD	Pts	Qualification
1	Zouk Mosbeh	3	3	0	0	19	6	+13	9	Champions
2	SAS	3	1	1	1	15	5	+10	4	
3	ÓBerytus	3	1	1	1	5	4	+1	4	
4	Akhaa Ahli Aley	3	0	0	3	3	27	−24	0	

Source: Goalzz.com
Rules for classification: 1) Points; 2) Goal difference; 3) Number of goals scored

== See also ==
- 2017–18 Lebanese Women's FA Cup
- 2017–18 Lebanese Women's Super Cup
