= 2012–13 Lebanese Women's Football League =

Football tournament season

Lebanese Women's Football League
- Season: 2012–13
- Dates: 23 February – 28 April 2013
- Champions: Sadaka; 6th title
- Matches: 30
- Goals: 111 (3.7 per match)
- Top goalscorer: Diakiese Kaluzodi (11 goals)
- Biggest win: Sadaka 10–0 Shooters (23 February 2013)
- Highest scoring: Sadaka 10–0 Shooters (23 February 2013)

The 2012–13 Lebanese Women's Football League was the sixth edition of the Lebanese Women's Football League since its inception in 2008. Five-time defending champions Sadaka won their sixth title.

== League table ==
Pos	Team	Pld	W	D	L	GF	GA	GD	Pts	Qualification
1	Sadaka	10	9	0	1	47	7	+40	27	Champions
2	GFA	10	8	0	2	27	10	+17	24	
3	FC Beirut	10	5	0	5	13	14	−1	15	
4	Athletico Beirut	10	4	1	5	11	17	−6	13	
5	Arabi	10	2	0	8	5	27	−22	6	
6	Shooters	10	1	1	8	8	36	−28	4	

Source: Global Sports Archive

== See also ==
- 2012–13 Lebanese Women's FA Cup
