= 2011–12 Lebanese Women's Football League =

Football tournament season

Lebanese Women's Football League
- Season: 2011–12
- Dates: 22 April – 11 July 2012
- Champions: Sadaka; 5th title
- Matches: 56
- Goals: 233 (4.16 per match)
- Top goalscorer: Sara Haidar (25 goals)
- Biggest win: Sadaka 11–0 Athletico Beirut (26 May 2012)
- Highest scoring: Shabab Arabi 9–3 Arabi (16 June 2012)

The 2011–12 Lebanese Women's Football League was the fifth edition of the Lebanese Women's Football League since its inception in 2008. Four-time defending champions Sadaka won their fifth title.

== League table ==
Pos	Team	Pld	W	D	L	GF	GA	GD	Pts	Qualification
1	Sadaka	14	12	1	1	76	2	+74	37	Champions
2	GFA	14	10	3	1	37	7	+30	33	
3	Shabab Arabi	14	8	3	3	32	16	+16	27	
4	Athletico Beirut	14	7	4	3	25	28	−3	25	
5	Arabi	14	5	1	8	20	41	−21	16	
6	Shooters	14	5	0	9	26	35	−9	15	
7	Phoenicia	14	2	0	12	10	54	−44	6	
8	FC Beirut	14	1	0	13	7	50	−43	3	

Source: Global Sports Archive

== See also ==
- 2011–12 Lebanese Women's FA Cup
