= Eleven Football Pro =

Lebanese women's football club

- Full name: Eleven Football Pro
- Short name: EFP
- Founded: 2019; 7 years ago
- Manager: Dany El Khoury
- League: Lebanese Women's Football League
- 2025–26: Lebanese Women's Football League, 5th of 9
- Website: https://11footballpro.com/
Home colours	Away colours

Eleven Football Pro (Arabic: نادي أيليفين فوتبول برو), or simply EFP, is a women's football club based in Zouk Mosbeh, Lebanon, section of the homonymous sports academy. Founded in 2019, they compete in the Lebanese Women's Football League and have won one Lebanese Women's FA Cup.

== History ==
Eleven Football Pro were founded in 2019. In 2019–20, their debut season, EFP came third in the league, after losing 4–2 to SAS in the final matchday of the season. They won their first trophy in 2021, winning the 2020–21 Lebanese Women's FA Cup final after beating BFA on penalties.

== Players ==
As of 19 April 2025

Note: Flags indicate national team as defined under FIFA eligibility rules; some limited exceptions apply. Players may hold more than one non-FIFA nationality.

No.	Pos.	Nation	Player
2	MF	LBN	Gwen Aoun
3	MF	LBN	Maria Mansour
4	DF	LBN	Ithamar Romanos (captain)
5	FW	LBN	Rachel Nassif
7	FW	LBN	Ayana Rezkallah
8	FW	LBN	Maria Mansour
14	DF	LBN	Perla Bartaa
16	DF	LBN	Marianne Merhej
17	DF	LBN	Elsa Korban
20	MF	LBN	Alexis Samaha
21	GK	LBN	Amal Jabbour
23	DF	LBN	Aya Edris
24	FW	LBN	Rebecca Mansour

No.	Pos.	Nation	Player
25	MF	LBN	Christelle Boutrous
26	MF	LBN	Marita Chebli
28	DF	LBN	Maria Semaan
30	DF	LBN	Remie Elias
31	DF	LBN	Michelle-Ange Issa
32	DF	LBN	Gilnar El Kaii
33	DF	LBN	Chloe Sassine
35	DF	LBN	Claire Hnein
39	FW	LBN	Aya Chahoud
42	DF	LBN	Christina Chebli
44	GK	LBN	Marie-Joe Chebli
45	DF	LBN	Stephanie Barakat
50	FW	LBN	Renata Maria Tannouri

== Honours ==
- Lebanese Women's FA Cup
  - Winners (1): 2020–21
- Lebanese Women's Super Cup
  - Runners-up (1): 2021–22

== See also ==
- Lebanese Women's Football League
- Women's football in Lebanon
- List of women's association football clubs in Lebanon
