= Anfal Al-Sufy =

Jordanian footballer

Personal information
- Full name: Anfal Nayef Hammad Al-Sufy
- Date of birth: 14 October 1995 (age 31)
- Place of birth: Amman, Jordan
- Position: Defender

International career^{‡}
Years	Team	Apps	(Gls)
	Jordan U19	1+	(0)
2013–2023	Jordan	60	(9)
- ‡ National team caps and goals as of 11 April 2023

Anfal Nayef Hammad Al-Sufy (born 14 October 1995) is a Jordanian former footballer who played as a defender for the Jordan women's national team.

== International goals ==
No.	Date	Venue	Opponent	Score	Result	Competition
1.	7 January 2019	Al-Muharraq Stadium, Muharraq, Bahrain	United Arab Emirates	4–1	4–1	2019 WAFF Women's Championship
2.	11 January 2019	Al-Muharraq Stadium, Muharraq, Bahrain	Lebanon	2–0	3–1	2019 WAFF Women's Championship
