= 2015–16 Lebanese Women's Football League =

Football tournament season

Lebanese Women's Football League
- Season: 2015–16
- Dates: 10 April – 6 June 2016
- Champions: SAS; 2nd title
- Matches: 12
- Goals: 56 (4.67 per match)
- Top goalscorer: Nadia Assaf (9 goals)
- Biggest win: GFA 10–0 Salam Zgharta
- Highest scoring: GFA 10–0 Salam Zgharta

The 2015–16 Lebanese Women's Football League was the ninth edition of the Lebanese Women's Football League since its inception in 2008. Defending champions SAS won their second title.

== League table ==
Pos	Team	Pld	W	D	L	GF	GA	GD	Pts	Qualification
1	SAS	6	4	1	1	18	8	+10	13	Champions
2	GFA	6	4	0	2	22	8	+14	12	
3	FC Beirut	6	3	1	2	14	5	+9	10	
4	Salam Zgharta	6	0	0	6	2	35	−33	0	
5	United Tripoli	0	0	0	0	0	0	0	0	Withdraw

Source: Global Sports Archive

== See also ==
- 2015–16 Lebanese Women's FA Cup
- 2015–16 Lebanese Women's Super Cup
