= Gayane Kostanyan =

Armenian footballer (born 1988)

Personal information
- Date of birth: 20 July 1988 (age 38)
- Height: 1.64 m (5 ft 5 in)
- Position: Forward

Senior career*
Years	Team	Apps	(Gls)
2002–2008	CSC Yerevan		(90)
2008–2012	Homenmen Beirut		(64)
2012–2013	Naftokhimik Kalush		(12)
2013–2014	Kubanochka Krasnodar	27	(9)
2015–2016	Kokshe		(6)
2016	FAF Marseille		

International career
- Armenia
- * Club domestic league appearances and goals

Gayane Kostanyan (born 20 July 1988) is an Armenian footballer who plays as a forward. She played for the Armenia national team.

Kostanyan played in Russia, Ukraine, Lebanon, Kazakhstan and France. In 2004, aged 16, she was recognized as the best player of the year in Armenia. In 2015, she started coaching the girls at the FAF Marseille in France.

== Honours ==
CSC Yerevan

- Armenian Women's League: 2001, 2004, 2005, 2006
- Armenian Women's Cup: 2004–05, 2005–06, 2006–07

Homenmen

- Lebanese Women's Football League runner-up: 2008–09

Naftokhimik Kalush

- Ukrainian Women's Cup: 2012
- Ukrainian Women's League runner-up: 2012

Kubanochka Krasnodar

- Russian Women's Cup runner-up: 2014

Kokshe

- Kazakhstani Women's Cup runner-up: 2015

Individual

- Best Armenian Women's Footballer: 2004
- Lebanese Women's Football League top goalscorer: 2008–09

== See also ==
- List of Armenia women's international footballers
