= No Limits FC =

Lebanese women's football club

No Limits
- Full name: No Limits Football Club
- Short name: NLFC
- Founded: 22 July 2017; 9 years ago
- President: Rabih Najjar
- Head coach: Hagop Demerjian
- League: Lebanese Women's Football League
- 2025–26: Lebanese Women's Football League, 1st of 9 (champions)
Home colours

No Limits Football Club (Arabic: نادي نوليميتس الرياضي) is a women's football club based in Jdeideh, Lebanon. Founded in 2017, the club is a part of the No Limits Football Academy, which was established in 2009. They compete in the Lebanese Women's Football League and have won one league title.

== History ==
Founded in 2009 as a football academy, No Limits were affiliated to the Lebanese Football Association on 22 July 2017. On 9 March 2023, the women's team was admitted to the Lebanese Women's Football League, making their debut in the 2023–24 Lebanese Women's Football League.

On 28 June 2026, No Limits were crowned champions of the 2025–26 Lebanese Women's Football League following a 3–0 win over Nejmeh in the final matchday of the season. Their league title win allowed them to participate in the 2026–27 AFC Women's Champions League preliminary stage, as the first Lebanese club to do so.

== Players ==
As of 28 June 2026

Note: Flags indicate national team as defined under FIFA eligibility rules; some limited exceptions apply. Players may hold more than one non-FIFA nationality.

| No. | Pos. | Nation | Player |
|---|---|---|---|
| 1 | GK | LBN | Selena Malaeb |
| 2 | DF | LBN | Karly Harfouche |
| 3 | DF | LBN | Dima Al Kasti |
| 4 | DF | LBN | Amina Karime |
| 5 | FW | GHA | Faustina Worwornyo |
| 6 | MF | LBN | Zahwa Arabi |
| 7 | FW | LBN | Sally Al Moujarkach |
| 8 | MF | LBN | Claya El Najjar |
| 9 | FW | LBN | Zeina Abi Faraj |
| 10 | FW | LBN | Mariam Chehab |
| 11 | DF | LBN | Abeer Mojahed |
| 12 | DF | LBN | Nour Kishly |
| 13 | MF | LBN | Emmanuelle Georges |
| 14 | FW | LBN | Razan Timani |

| No. | Pos. | Nation | Player |
|---|---|---|---|
| 15 | MF | LBN | Lara Farhat |
| 17 | DF | LBN | Lara Bou Hamra |
| 18 | DF | LBN | Celine Al Haddad |
| 19 | DF | LBN | Clara El Najjar |
| 20 | FW | LBN | Caren Serhal |
| 21 | FW | LBN | Anji Saad |
| 24 | GK | LBN | Arlette Ghostine |
| 27 | FW | LBN | Tatianna El Kaym |
| 30 | FW | LBN | Merry Habak |
| 61 | MF | LBN | Mariam Monzer |
| 77 | FW | LBN | Angy Boustany |
| 91 | DF | LBN | Fadia Abou Saleh |
| 99 | DF | LBN | Rawane El Hajj |

== Honours ==
- Lebanese Women's Football League
  - Winners (1): 2025–26

== Performance in AFC competitions ==
- AFC Women's Champions League: 1 appearance

2026–27: To be determined

All results list No Limits FC's goal tally first.

| Season | Competition | Round | Club | Result |
|---|---|---|---|---|
| 2026–27 | AFC Women's Champions League | Preliminary stage | (Chinese Taipei) New Taipei City Hang Yuan | 0–6 |
| 2026–27 | AFC Women's Champions League | Preliminary stage | (Myanmar) Ayeyawady | 0–8 |
| 2026–27 | AFC Women's Champions League | Preliminary stage | (Singapore) Albirex Jurong | 1–2 |

== See also ==
- Lebanese Women's Football League
- Women's football in Lebanon
- List of women's association football clubs in Lebanon
