= 2009–10 Lebanese Women's Football League =

Football tournament season

Lebanese Women's Football League
- Season: 2009–10
- Dates: 20 March – 5 June 2010
- Champions: Sadaka; 3rd title
- Matches: 20
- Goals: 124 (6.2 per match)
- Top goalscorer: Sara Haidar (16 goals)
- Biggest win: Sadaka 14–0 Shabab Tripoli (9 May 2010)
- Highest scoring: Sadaka 14–0 Shabab Tripoli (9 May 2010)

The 2009–10 Lebanese Women's Football League was the third edition of the Lebanese Women's Football League since its inception in 2008. Two-time defending champions Sadaka won their third title.

== League table ==
Pos	Team	Pld	W	D	L	GF	GA	GD	Pts	Qualification
1	Sadaka	8	7	1	0	59	2	+57	22	Champions
2	Athletico Beirut	8	5	1	2	33	6	+27	16	
3	Shabab Arabi	8	4	0	4	21	15	+6	12	
4	Adab W Riyada Kfarchima	8	2	1	5	7	47	−40	7	
5	Shabab Tripoli	8	0	1	7	4	54	−50	1	

Source: Global Sports Archive

== See also ==
- 2009–10 Lebanese Women's FA Cup
