= 2008–09 Lebanese Women's Football League =

Football tournament season

Lebanese Women's Football League
- Season: 2008–09
- Dates: 14 March – 24 May 2009
- Champions: Sadaka; 2nd title
- Matches: 30
- Goals: 171 (5.7 per match)
- Top goalscorer: Sara Haidar; Gayane Kostanyan (13 goals each)
- Biggest win: Homenmen 16–0 Shabab Tripoli (28 March 2009)
- Highest scoring: Homenmen 16–0 Shabab Tripoli (28 March 2009)

The 2008–09 Lebanese Women's Football League was the second edition of the Lebanese Women's Football League since its inception in 2008. Defending champions Sadaka won their second title, with a 2–0 victory over Homenmen in the final matchday of the season.

== League table ==
Pos	Team	Pld	W	D	L	GF	GA	GD	Pts	Qualification
1	Sadaka	10	9	0	1	50	11	+39	27	Champions
2	Homenmen	10	6	2	2	52	7	+45	20	
3	Ansar	10	6	2	2	34	6	+28	20	
4	Shabab Arabi	10	4	0	6	19	22	−3	12	
5	Adab W Riyada Kfarchima	10	1	1	8	4	66	−62	4	
6	Shabab Tripoli	10	1	1	8	12	59	−47	4	

Source: Global Sports Archive

== See also ==
- 2008–09 Lebanese Women's FA Cup
