= 2010–11 Lebanese Women's Football League =

Football tournament season

Lebanese Women's Football League
- Season: 2010–11
- Dates: 1 May – 3 July 2011
- Champions: Sadaka; 4th title
- Matches: 30
- Goals: 198 (6.6 per match)
- Top goalscorer: Sara Haidar (22 goals)
- Biggest win: Athletico Beirut 15–0 FC Beirut (15 May 2011); Sadaka 15–0 FC Beirut (16 June 2011)
- Highest scoring: Athletico Beirut 15–0 FC Beirut (15 May 2011); Sadaka 14–1 FC Beirut (22 May 2011); Sadaka 15–0 FC Beirut (16 June 2011)

The 2010–11 Lebanese Women's Football League was the fourth edition of the Lebanese Women's Football League since its inception in 2008. Three-time defending champions Sadaka won their fourth title.

== League table ==
Pos	Team	Pld	W	D	L	GF	GA	GD	Pts	Qualification
1	Sadaka	10	10	0	0	90	7	+83	30	Champions
2	Athletico Beirut	10	8	0	2	52	7	+45	24	
3	Shabab Arabi	10	5	1	4	27	22	+5	16	
4	FC Beirut	10	3	0	7	9	67	−58	9	
5	Arabi Tripoli	10	2	1	7	15	39	−24	7	
6	Shooters	10	1	0	9	5	56	−51	3	

Source: Global Sports Archive

== See also ==
- 2010–11 Lebanese Women's FA Cup
