= 2025–26 Lebanese Women's Football League =

Football tournament season

Lebanese Women's Football League
- Season: 2025–26
- Dates: 14 December 2025 – 28 June 2026
- Champions: No Limits; 1st title
- AFC Champions League: No Limits
- Matches: 54
- Goals: 302 (5.59 per match)
- Top goalscorer: Ayana Rezkallah (21 goals)
- Biggest win: Mawadda Tripoli 0–21 BFA (11 January 2026)
- Highest scoring: Mawadda Tripoli 0–21 BFA (11 January 2026)

The 2025–26 Lebanese Women's Football League was the 19th edition of the Lebanese Women's Football League since it was formed in 2008.

The season began on 14 December 2025. Due to the breakout of the 2026 Lebanon war on 2 March 2026, the Lebanese Football Association (LFA) suspended all football activities on 18 March. On 2 June 2026, following a 10-day ceasefire of the war, the LFA announced the resumption of the women's league on 7 June.

No Limits won their first title after defeating Nejmeh 3–0 in the final matchday. Ayana Rezkallah of EFP finished top scorer with 21 goals.

== League table ==
Pos	Team	Pld	W	D	L	GF	GA	GD	Pts	Qualification (Note: Teams played each other once in the first phase (6 matches). In the second phase, the top four teams played each other twice more (6 matches), while the bottom six teams played each other once (4 matches). Teams carried over half their point tally from the first phase into the second phase.)
1	No Limits (C)	14	12	1	1	57	4	+53	26	Qualification for the AFC Women's Champions League preliminary stage
2	BFA	14	11	1	2	75	8	+67	24	
3	Nejmeh	14	7	3	4	42	16	+26	15	
4	Jwaya	14	4	2	8	31	29	+2	8	
5	Jounieh	11	5	3	3	24	13	+11	13	
6	EFP	11	5	2	4	50	17	+33	12	
7	Sanharib	11	2	0	9	12	57	−45	3	
8	Safa Saad Barouk	11	1	0	10	7	79	−72	3	
9	Mawadda Tripoli (Note: Mawadda Tripoli withdrew after the regular season (8 matches).)	8	1	0	7	4	79	−75	2	

Source: Global Sports Archive
Rules for classification: 1) Points; 2) Head-to-head points; 3) Head-to-head goal difference; 4) Goal difference; 5) Goals scored; 6) Disciplinary points.
(C) Champions

== Top goalscorers ==
Rank	Player	Club	Goals
1	(Lebanon) Ayana Rezkallah	EFP	21
2	(Lebanon) Lea El Hage Ali	BFA	18
3	(Lebanon) Angelina Saade	BFA	12
4	(Lebanon) Lama Abdine	BFA	11
4	(Lebanon) Lea Douaihy	BFA	11
6	(Lebanon) Nancy Tchaylian	Nejmeh	10
7	(Lebanon) Lara Bou Hamra	No Limits	9
7	(Lebanon) Hoda Hamzi	Nejmeh	9
9	(Lebanon) Yasma Rizk	Sanharib	8
