= Athletico SC (Lebanon) =

Football academy based in Dbayeh, Lebanon

Athletico
- Full name: Athletico Sports Club
- Founded: 2006; 20 years ago
- Based in: Beirut
- Colors: Blue and yellow
- President: Robert Paoli
- Website: www.athleticosc.com

Athletico Sports Club (Arabic: نادي اتلتيكو الرياضي), known as Athletico Beirut or simply Athletico, is a football academy based in Dbayeh, Mount Lebanon Governorate, Lebanon.

== History ==
Founded in 2006, the academy has eight branches across the country.

Since 2011, Athletico has been partnered with French club Olympique Lyonnais. In particular, Lyon provide the academy with training expertise and facilities. Athletico graduate Philippe Paoli moved to Lyon's B team in 2013. In September 2026, Athletico and Olympique Lyonnais extended their partnership for three additional years, until June 2029.

In 2019, Athletico became the first football academy in the Middle East to receive the "One-Star" label from the Asian Football Confederation (AFC). In 2021, the AFC approved Athletico as an elite one-star academy after meeting the 20 criteria in the AFC's Elite Youth Scheme.

== Senior teams ==
The women's team was founded in 2010 as one of the first in Lebanon. They were league runners up in the 2009–10 season, and cup finalists in 2010–11. They withdrew their team prior to the 2012–13 season.

The men's senior team won the Lebanese Fourth Division Beirut in 2021–22, and were promoted to the Third Division. They won the Fourth Division Beirut once more in 2024–25.

== Honours ==
=== Men ===
- Lebanese Fourth Division Beirut
  - Champions (2): 2021–22, 2024–25

=== Women ===
- Lebanese Women's FA Cup
  - Runners-up (1): 2010–11

== See also ==
- Lebanese Women's Football League
- Women's football in Lebanon
- List of women's association football clubs in Lebanon
