= Al Ansar FC (women) =

Women's association football club from Lebanon

Ansar Women
- Full name: Al Ansar Football Club Women
- Founded: 17 April 2007; 17 years ago
- Dissolved: 2010; 15 years ago
- League: Lebanese Women's Football League
| Home colours | Away colours |

Al Ansar Football Club (Arabic: نادي الأنصار الرياضي السيدات) was the women's team of the Lebanese association football club Ansar. Founded in 2007 as one of the first women's teams in Lebanon, Ansar withdrew their women's team prior to the 2011 season.

== History ==
Ansar's women's team began their activities on 17 April 2007.

== Honours ==
- Lebanese Women's FA Cup
  - Runners-up (2): 2007–08, 2008–09

== See also ==
- Lebanese Women's Football League
- Women's football in Lebanon
- List of women's association football clubs in Lebanon
