= Nejmeh SC (women) =

Women's association football club from Lebanon

Nejmeh
- Full name: Nejmeh Sporting Club
- Founded: 1 August 2016 (9 years ago) as ÓBerytus; 22 October 2025 (8 months ago) as Nejmeh SC
- Chairman: Saeed Serbeh
- Manager: Saad Jradi
- League: Lebanese Women's Football League
- 2025–26: Lebanese Women's Football League, 3rd of 9
Home colours

Nejmeh Sporting Club (Arabic: نادي النجمة الرياضي), commonly referred to as Nejmeh, is a women's football club based in Manara, a neighbourhood in Ras Beirut, Beirut, Lebanon. It is the women's section of Nejmeh SC and competes in the Lebanese Women's Football League.

The club was previously known as ÓBerytus (2016–2025).

== History ==
Formed in 2016, ÓBerytus debuted in the 2017–18 season, finishing in third place. In 2017, the U18 Women's team also competed in the Gothia Cup. In 2018–19, they came third once again. ÓBerytus reached their best-ever placement in the 2024–25 season, finishing runners-up behind BFA.

On 22 October 2025, the club was acquired by Nejmeh SC and renamed to reflect the ownership change.

== Players ==
As of 10 May 2025

Note: Flags indicate national team as defined under FIFA eligibility rules; some limited exceptions apply. Players may hold more than one non-FIFA nationality.

No.	Pos.	Nation	Player
1	GK	LBN	Aya Kobaissi
3	DF	LBN	Meg Tarraf
5	DF	LBN	Waed Raed
6	MF	LBN	Latifa Kilani
7	DF	LBN	Rakelle Nasr
8	MF	LBN	Yara El Gitani
9	FW	LBN	Yara Chaptini
10	MF	LBN	Nancy Tchaylian (captain)
11	FW	LBN	Yara Srour
12	DF	LBN	Nourelhouda Khalil
13	MF	LBN	Gaelle Monsef
14	DF	LBN	Christina Sayegh
15	DF	LBN	Patricia Mezher

No.	Pos.	Nation	Player
16	MF	LBN	Djana Felefle
17	FW	LBN	Jana Korjieh
18	DF	LBN	Serena Fakhri
19	FW	LBN	Alaa Akkouch
20	FW	LBN	Douaa Kobeissi
21	MF	LBN	Nagham Abou Khalil
23	GK	LBN	Maha Korjieh
24	MF	LBN	Yasmine Hamdar
27	GK	LBN	Cyrine Bachir
33	FW	LBN	Shirley Lewis
44	MF	LBN	Shahed El Hassan
99	DF	LBN	Reem Mostafa

== Honours ==
- Lebanese Women's Football League
  - Runners-up (1): 2024–25

== See also ==
- Lebanese Women's Football League
- Women's football in Lebanon
- List of women's association football clubs in Lebanon
