= Women's football in Lebanon =

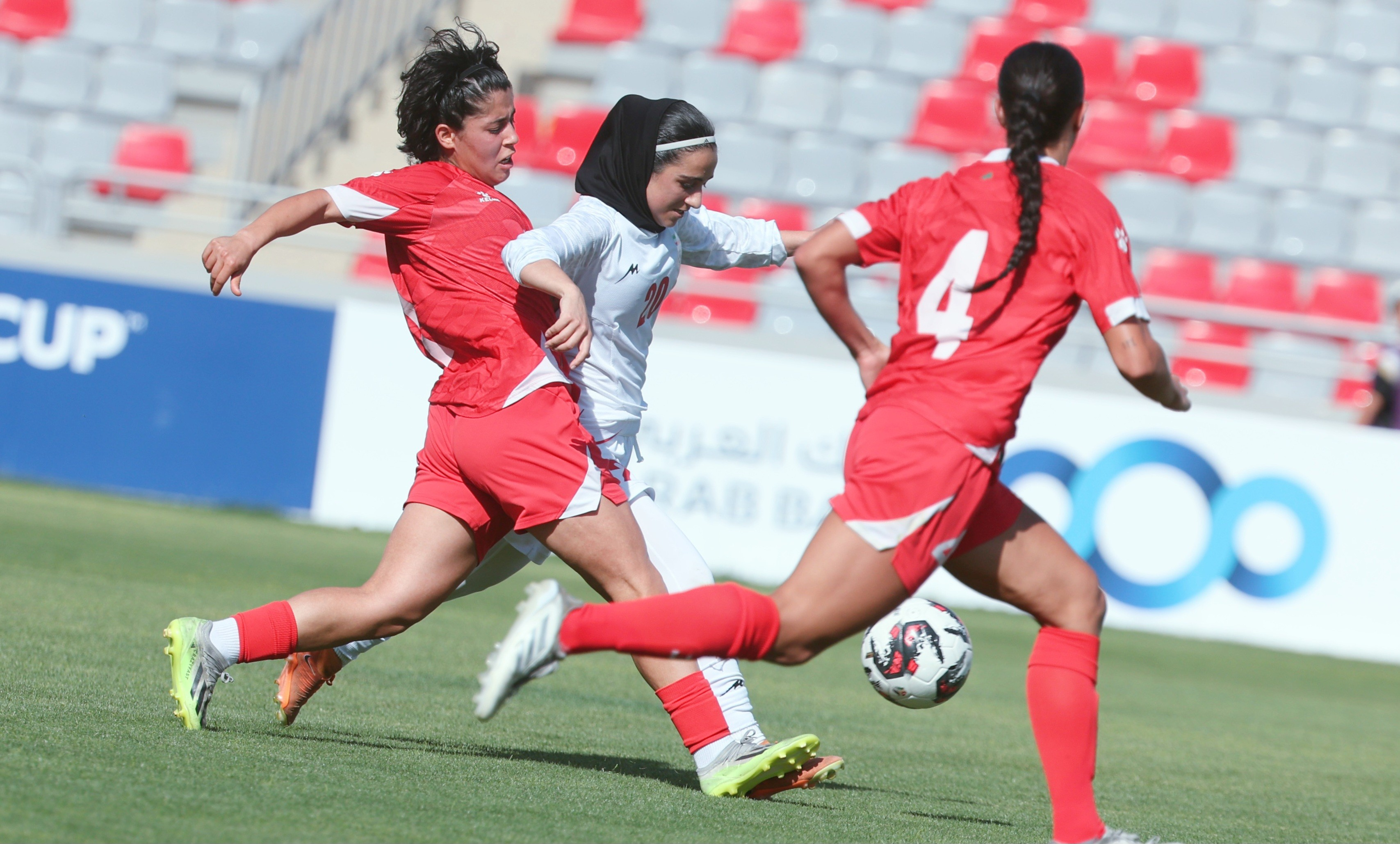
- The women's national team against Iran at the 2026 Asian Cup qualifiers
- Country: Lebanon
- Governing body: Lebanon Football Association
- National team: Women's national team
- First played: 1964 (unofficially); 2005 (officially)
- Registered players: 650 (as of 2019)
- Clubs: 11 (2023–24)

National competitions
- FIFA Women's World Cup; AFC Women's Asian Cup; Arab Women's Cup; WAFF Women's Championship

Club competitions
- Lebanese Women's Football League; Lebanese Women's Cup; Lebanese Women's Super Cup

International competitions
- AFC Women's Club Championship; WAFF Women's Clubs Championship

Women's football in Lebanon officially began in 2005, with the creation of the Lebanese Women's Football (LWF). Founded in 2008, the Lebanese Women's Football League is the national club league; Sadaka and SAS won the league a record seven times each. Internationally, Safa became the first Lebanese team to win the WAFF Women's Clubs Championship in 2022.

The senior national team, who made their debut in 2006, finished runners-up in the WAFF Women's Championship in 2022, and in third place twice in 2007 and 2019. The youth teams won the Arab U-17 Women's Cup in 2015, the WAFF U-18 Girls Championship in 2019 and 2022, and the WAFF U-17 Girls Championship in 2019, 2023, and 2025. The under-17 team also qualified for the 2026 AFC U-17 Women's Asian Cup, becoming the first Lebanese women's national team to reach the Asian Cup.

== History ==
In 1964, the American University of Beirut (AUB) appointed their first-ever women's physical education teacher, Rose La Sorte from the United States. She introduced women's football to AUB's curriculum for the first time.

The AUB formed a proper women's football team in October–November 1998 under the initiative of student Luma Shihab-Eldin. In February 1999, the AUB played their first game against the women's team of the Notre Dame University–Louaize (NDU), which finished 4–4. Two other schools in Lebanon also had a women's football team: the American Community School Beirut (ACS) and the International College, Beirut (IC). In 2002, the first interscholastic girls' football tournament was played.

In 2005, the Lebanese Women's Football (LWF) committee was formed, affiliated to the Lebanese Football Association (LFA), to oversee the women's national teams. From the late 2010s, football became more widespread among the female population in Lebanon. Indeed, in 2019 there were 650 registered players, compared to 150 in 2005. With the LFA investing more into the women's youth system, Lebanon has achieved considerable success within its region (West Asia) both at the national team and club levels.

A turning point in youth development came in 2017–2018, when a new head of women's football launched a nationwide plan to organize U15, U17, and U19 leagues and national teams. This structured approach produced early results in regional tournaments. However, political and economic crises — including the 2019–20 revolution, the COVID-19 pandemic, and the 2020 Beirut port explosion — disrupted momentum.

== Clubs ==
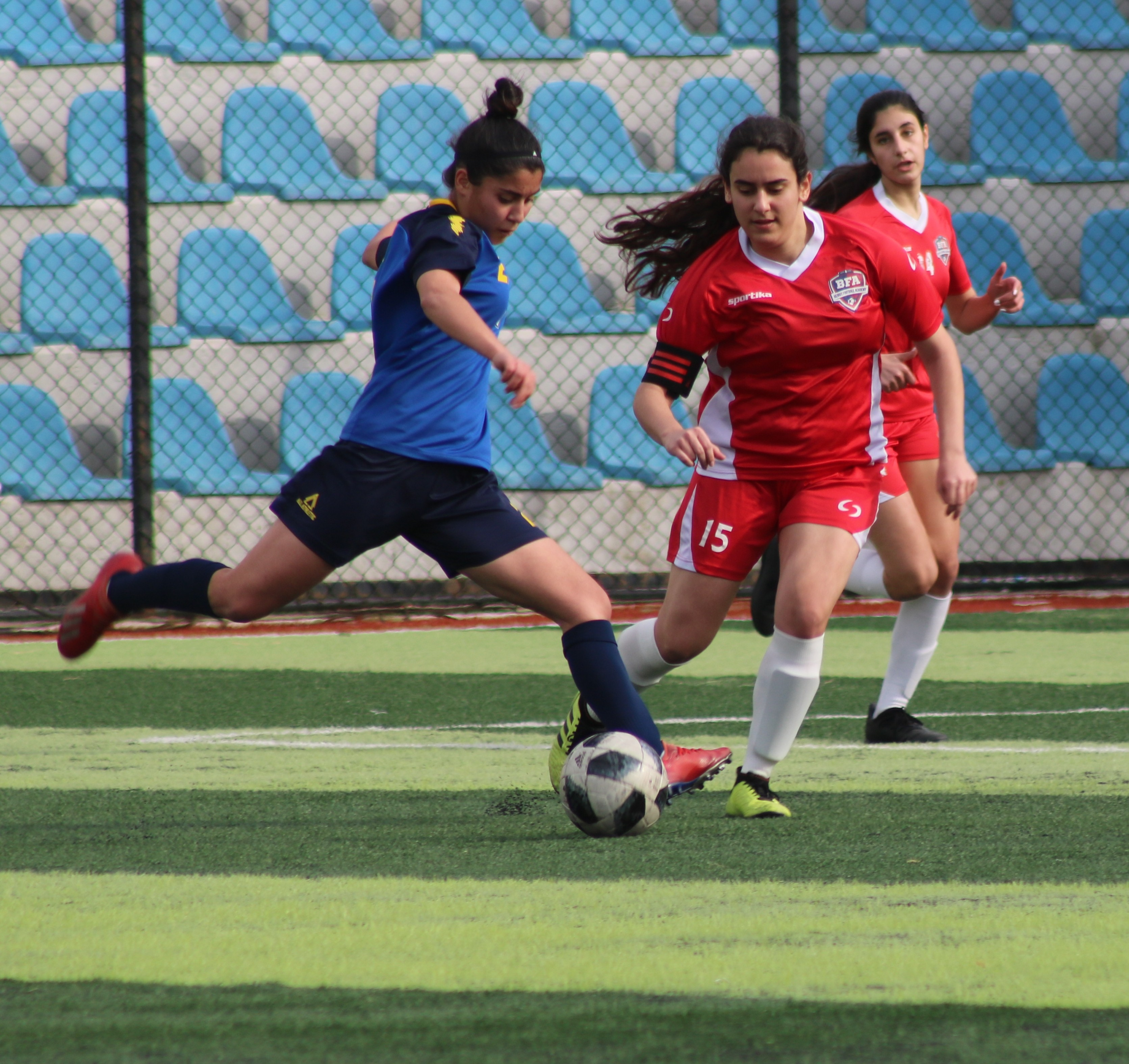
Match between Safa and BFA in 2020

The Lebanese Women's Football League was founded in 2008, with Sadaka winning the first title. They went on to win seven league titles in a row, until they dissolved in 2014. From the 2014–15 season onwards, Stars Association for Sports (SAS) became the dominating force in Lebanon, winning seven of the following nine league titles. There are two domestic women's cup competitions in Lebanon: the Lebanese Women's Cup and the Lebanese Women's Super Cup.

In 2019, SAS finished runners-up in the inaugural edition of the WAFF Women's Clubs Championship, a club competition for teams from West Asia. Safa became the first Lebanese team to win the competition, winning the final of the second edition in 2022. After winning the 2025–26 league title, No Limits qualified for 2026–27 AFC Women's Champions League preliminary stage as the first Lebanese club to do so.

== National teams ==
Established in 2005, the Lebanon women's national football team was among the first in West Asia. The senior team made its debut at the 2006 Arab Women's Championship, finishing last in the tournament. Their first participation in an official qualification campaign came at the 2014 AFC Women's Asian Cup qualifiers. Over the years, Lebanon have shown gradual progress, finishing third at the WAFF Women's Championship in 2007 and 2019, and reaching the final in 2022, where they finished as runners-up.

Lebanon's youth teams have played a key role in the development of women's football in the country. The under-17 team won the 2015 Arab U-17 Women's Cup – the first official title ever achieved by any Lebanese national football team, male or female. Subsequent success followed, with victories in the WAFF U-15 and U-18 Girls Championships in 2019, a second WAFF U-18 title in 2022 after a 5–1 win over Syria in the final as hosts, and a second WAFF U-16 title in 2023. Lebanon won their third WAFF U-17 title in 2025.

In October 2025, the under-17 team achieved a historic milestone by defeating Iran 2–0 to qualify for the 2026 AFC U-17 Women's Asian Cup. This marked the first time any Lebanese women's national team, senior or youth, qualified for an Asian Cup tournament.

== Reception ==
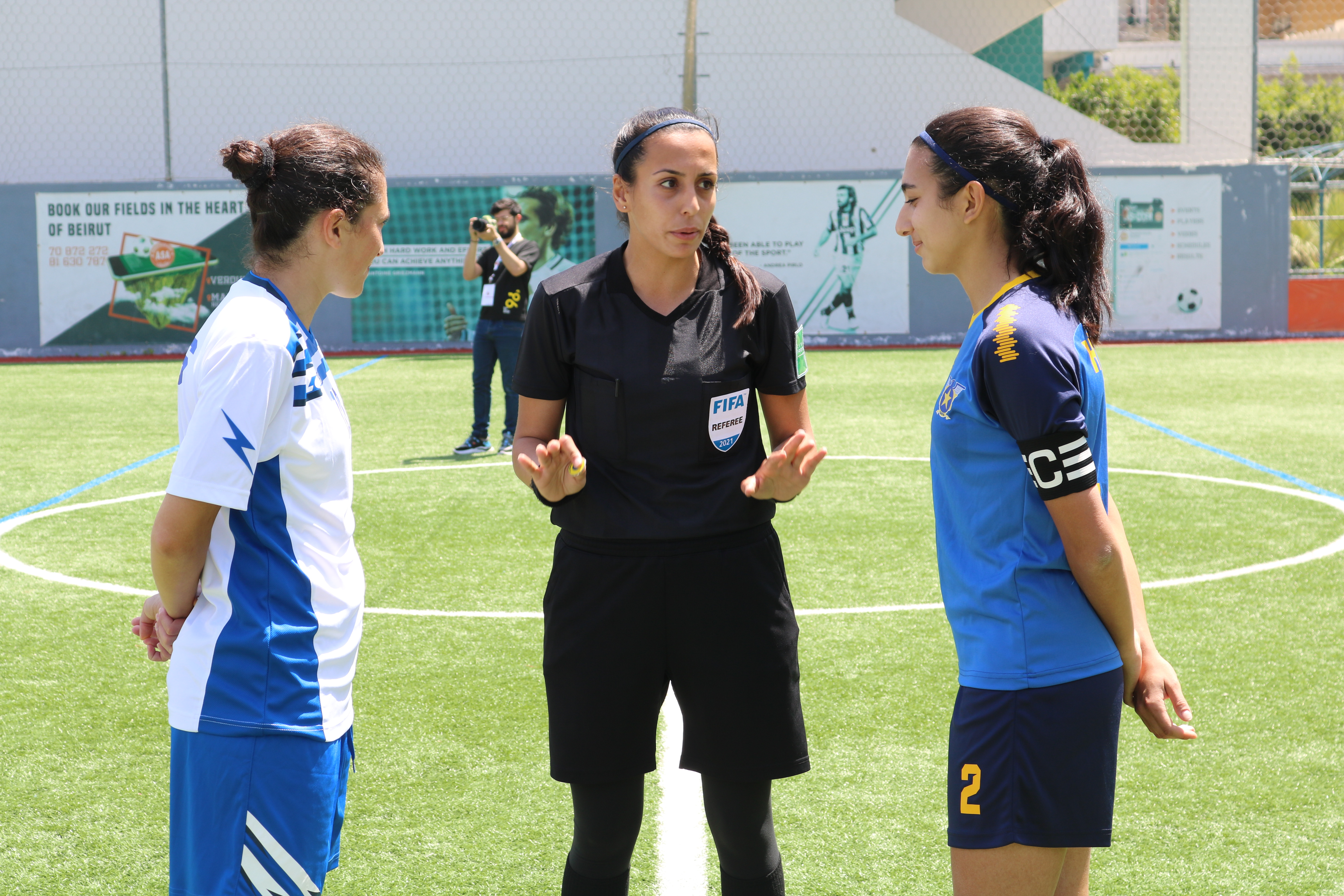
Doumouh Al Bakkar (center) as referee in a match between Safa and SAS in 2021.

While not popular, women's football has mainly been played in affluent areas in Lebanon since the 2000s. One of the barriers of the growing sport has been the prejudice that many women have faced for playing it.

The sport has become more popular since the late 2010s, with increasing numbers in participation nationwide and more supporters (both women and men) in the stands. Many parents also encourage their daughters to play. However, while women's participation in football has been generally viewed positively in most cities, the more conservative communities still view football as a "male sport".

In 2017, Doumouh Al Bakkar became the first Lebanese female referee to officiate a game between men, in a friendly game between Lebanese Premier League sides Safa and Tadamon Sour. Regarding her experience refereeing a match between two top-tier men's clubs, Al Bakkar stated: "Some players were surprised at the idea of a woman officiating the game, others laughed. But of course, on the other hand, some were cooperative and offered me words of encouragement".

Former Lebanese national team player and PhD researcher Assile Toufaily spoke about the structural and cultural barriers that female players face in Lebanon. Despite the growth in youth participation and national success, she noted persistent issues such as inadequate training times, lack of proper equipment, and the marginalization of women's teams compared to men's teams. For instance, while male players often trained at 4–5 p.m., girls as young as 15 were often assigned late training hours (9–10 p.m.). Toufaily also highlighted the lack of financial support, as many club presidents paid expenses from their own pockets due to the absence of investors or federation support.

"We invest time, we invest money, we invest effort — and we get nothing in return."

— Assile Toufaily

Lebanese nationality law also creates a structural disadvantage for Lebanese women in the diaspora. Children of Lebanese mothers and foreign fathers do not automatically acquire Lebanese nationality, unlike children of Lebanese fathers. The restriction can affect the eligibility of players with Lebanese maternal heritage who might otherwise be available to the national team.

== See also ==
- List of women's football clubs in Lebanon
- Football in Lebanon
- Women in Lebanon
