= Safa WFC =

Lebanese women's football club

Safa
- Full name: Safa Women's Football Club
- Short name: SWFC
- Founded: 14 May 2019
- Dissolved: 31 July 2022; 2 years ago
Home colours	Away colours

Safa Women's Football Club (Arabic: نادي الصفاء الرياضي للسيدات), or simply Safa, was a women's football club based in Wata El-Museitbeh, Beirut, Lebanon, section of the homonymous football club. Founded in 2019, they competed in the Lebanese Women's Football League, which they won in 2020–21. They were disbanded following the 2021–22 season.

== History ==
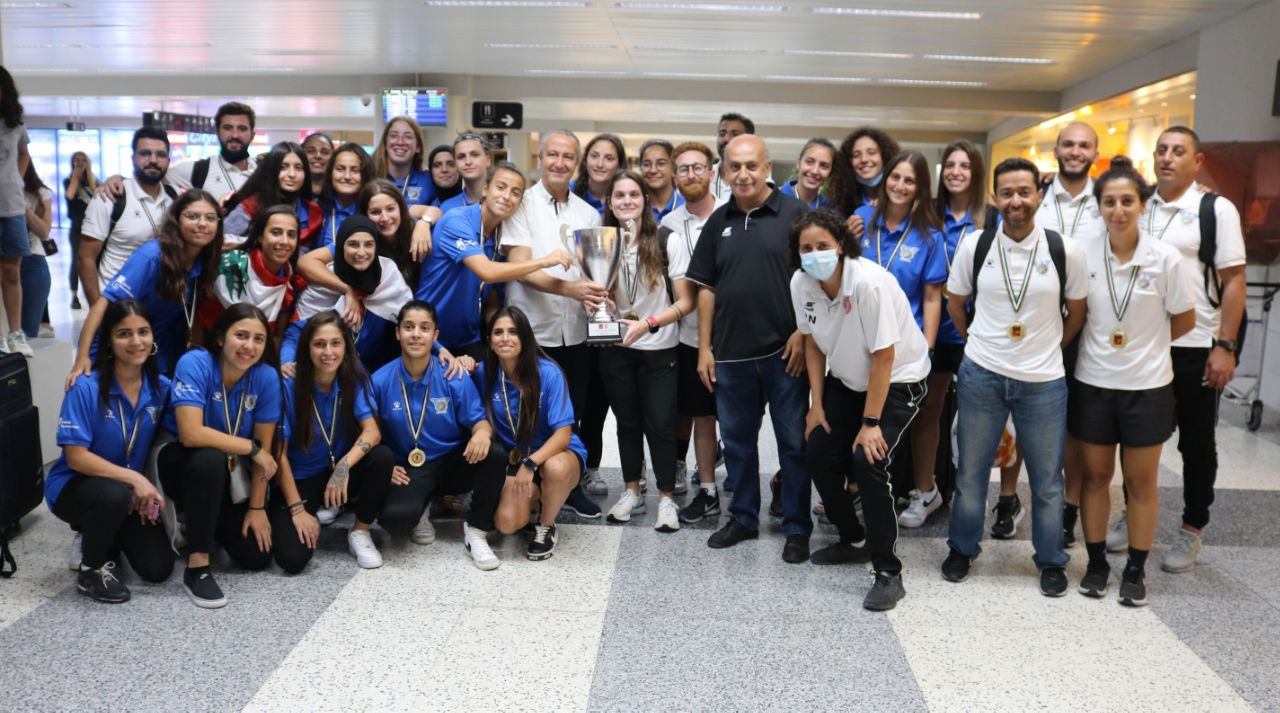
Safa after returning as victors from the 2022 WAFF Women's Clubs Championship

Founded on 14 May 2019, Safa debuted in the 2019–20 season and finished in second place. They won their only league title in the 2020–21 season, after beating ÓBerytus 6–1 in the final matchday of the season. Having won the league, Safa qualified to compete in the 2022 edition of the WAFF Women's Clubs Championship for the first time. They became the first Lebanese team to win the competition, after beating Orthodox of Jordan 3–1 in the final.

On 31 July 2022, Safa announced the dissolution of its women's team.

== Honours ==
=== Domestic ===
- Lebanese Women's Football League
  - Winners (1): 2020–21
- Lebanese Women's Super Cup
  - Winners (1): 2021–22

=== Regional ===
- WAFF Women's Clubs Championship
  - Winners (1): 2022

== See also ==
- Women's football in Lebanon
- List of women's association football clubs in Lebanon
