= 2014–15 Lebanese Women's Football League =

Football tournament season

Lebanese Women's Football League
- Season: 2014–15
- Dates: 13 May – 16 August 2015
- Champions: SAS; 1st title
- Matches: 20
- Goals: 80 (4 per match)
- Top goalscorer: Sara Bakri (7 goals)
- Biggest win: GFA 10–2 United Tripoli (13 May 2015)
- Highest scoring: GFA 10–2 United Tripoli (13 May 2015)

The 2014–15 Lebanese Women's Football League was the eighth edition of the Lebanese Women's Football League since its inception in 2008. SAS won their first title.

== League table ==
Pos	Team	Pld	W	D	L	GF	GA	GD	Pts	Qualification
1	SAS	8	7	1	0	27	4	+23	22	Champions
2	FC Beirut	8	4	1	3	12	13	−1	13 (Note: Head-to-head results: FC Beirut 1–0 GFA; FC Beirut 2–1 GFA.)	
3	GFA	8	4	1	3	24	8	+16	13	
4	Arabi	8	2	1	5	7	20	−13	7	
5	United Tripoli	8	1	0	7	10	35	−25	3	

Source: Global Sports Archive

== See also ==
- 2014–15 Lebanese Women's FA Cup
