= Sadaka SC =

Lebanese multi-sports club in Beirut

Sadaka
- Full name: Sadaka Sporting Club
- Short name: SSC
- Founded: 1995; 31 years ago
- Based in: Beirut
- Colors: Blue and yellow
- President: Abdallah Ashour

Sadaka Sporting Club (Arabic: نادي الصداقة الرياضي, lit. 'The Friendship Sporting Club') is a multi-sports club based in Beirut, Lebanon. The club has consisted of various departments throughout their history, including handball, futsal, women's football, and kung fu.

Sadaka's women's football department began in 2008 as one of the first women's teams in Lebanon, winning the first seven league titles, as well as the first six FA Cups. They withdrew their team prior to the 2014–15 season.

== Honours ==
=== Men's futsal ===
- Lebanese Futsal League
  - Winners (2): 2010–11, 2012–13

=== Women's football ===
- Lebanese Women's Football League
  - Winners (7; joint record): 2007–08, 2008–09, 2009–10, 2010–11, 2011–12, 2012–13, 2013–14
- Lebanese Women's FA Cup
  - Winners (6; record): 2007–08, 2008–09, 2009–10, 2010–11, 2011–12, 2012–13

== See also ==
- Women's football in Lebanon
