= Stars Association for Sports =

Women's association football club from Lebanon

SAS
- Full name: Stars Association for Sports
- Nickname(s): The SASers
- Short name: SAS
- Founded: 7 July 2011, as Stars Academy for Sports
- Dissolved: 21 December 2024; 3 months ago
Home colours	Away colours

Stars Association for Sports (Arabic: جمعية نجوم الرياضة), or simply SAS, was a women's football club section of the similarly-named sports academy, based in Aley, Lebanon. Founded in 2011 as Stars Academy for Sports, they competed in the Lebanese Women's Football League between 2014 and 2024.

SAS won seven league titles, three FA Cup titles, and one Super Cup title, and were runners-up in the inaugural edition of the WAFF Women's Clubs Championship in 2019.

== History ==
Established in 2011 as "Stars Academy for Sports" (SAS), the senior team debuted in the Lebanese Women's Football League in 2013–14. They won the 2014–15 league title after beating Girls Football Academy (GFA) in the final matchday of the season, on 23 July 2015, and won the FA Cup by beating FC Beirut 3–0 in the final, on 28 August 2015. SAS won three consecutive league titles, between the 2014–15 and 2016–17 season.

Ahead of the 2017–18 season, SAS changed their name to "Stars Association for Sports". They achieved their second domestic double in 2018–19 by winning both the league (their fourth in total) and the FA Cup (their second).

In 2019 SAS took part in the inaugural edition of the WAFF Women's Clubs Championship, an international club competition for West Asian (WAFF) clubs, along with four other clubs. After winning their opening two matches, against Arab Orthodox (7–0) and Abu Dhabi (2–1), SAS lost against eventual champions Shabab Ordon (3–0), before drawing the last game of the tournament against Riffa (3–3) to finish as runners-up.

On 1 March 2020, SAS won 4–2 against newly-founded Eleven Football Pro (EFP) in the effective final of the 2019–20 season, becoming five-time champions of the league. They won their sixth league title in the 2021–22 season, after defeating defending champions Safa 2–1 in the final matchday. Having won the 2022–23 league title, SAS became seven-time champions, a joint record with Sadaka.

After having won seven league titles, three cup titles, and one Super Cup, the club announced its dissolution on 21 December 2024.

== Managerial history ==
Below is a list of SAS managers from 2014 until the present day.

Name	Nationality	Years
Wael Gharzeddine	(Lebanon)	2014–2017
Said Wehbe	(Lebanon)	2017–2020
Farid Njeim	(Lebanon)	2020–2024

== Honours ==
=== Domestic ===
- Lebanese Women's Football League
  - Winners (7; joint record): 2014–15, 2015–16, 2016–17, 2018–19, 2019–20, 2021–22, 2022–23
- Lebanese Women's FA Cup
  - Winners (3): 2013–14, 2014–15, 2018–19
  - Runners-up (2): 2016–17, 2017–18
- Lebanese Women's Super Cup
  - Winners (1): 2016–17
  - Runners-up (3): 2015–16, 2017–18, 2018–19

=== Regional ===
- WAFF Women's Clubs Championship
  - Runners-up (1): 2019

== See also ==
- Lebanese Women's Football League
- Women's football in Lebanon
- List of women's association football clubs in Lebanon
