= Girls Football Academy =

Women's association football club from Lebanon

GFA
- Full name: Girls Football Academy
- Founded: November 2011
- Dissolved: 31 August 2017; 7 years ago
- League: Lebanese Women's Football League
Home colours	Away colours

Girls Football Academy (Arabic: اكاديمية الفتاة), or simply GFA, was a women's football academy based in Beirut, Lebanon. They were founded in 2011 as the first exclusively female football academy in the Middle East.

GFA's senior team were runners up three times in a row in the Lebanese Women's Football League, between 2012 and 2014, as well as in the 2015–16 Lebanese Women's FA Cup. They withdrew their team in 2017, prior to the 2017–18 season.

== History ==
GFA was founded in November 2011 by former international footballer Nadia Assaf and her friend Walid Arakji, alongside Aya Chiry and Karen Haddad, as the first private football academy for girls in the Middle East.

== Honours ==
- Lebanese Women's FA Cup
  - Runners-up (1): 2015–16

== See also ==
- Lebanese Women's Football League
- Women's football in Lebanon
- List of women's association football clubs in Lebanon
