= Beirut Football Academy =

Lebanese football academy

- Full name: Beirut Football Academy
- Short name: BFA
- Founded: March 2004; 22 years ago
- Based in: Beirut
- Colors: Red and blue
- President: Ziad Saade
- Website: bfa-lebanon.com

Beirut Football Academy (Arabic: أكاديمية بيروت لكرة القدم), or simply BFA, is a football academy based in Furn El Chebbak, a district in Beirut, Lebanon. Founded in 2004 as the first football academy in the country, they play their games at the Al Sharq Stadium.

They operate a women's team, which competes in the Lebanese Women's Football League, and a men's team, called BFA Sporting, which competes in the Lebanese Third Division.

== Academy ==
=== History ===
Beirut Football Academy (BFA) was founded in March 2004 as Lebanon's first football academy. Over the years, BFA expanded from its original base in Furn El Chebbak into a nationwide academy network. The academy operates nine branches across Lebanon: Furn El Chebbak, Hazmieh, Sin El Fil, Mansourieh, Beit Mery, Haddath, Kfarshima, Sahel Alma, and Sultan Yaacoub in the West Bekaa (an affiliate branch through Al Sultan Yacoub Club).

On 29 December 2019, BFA signed an agreement with Cypriot club AEK Larnaca, with the two clubs becoming affiliates. The partnership included cooperation between the two academies, with AEK Larnaca coaches visiting Lebanon to conduct training sessions and seminars for BFA coaches and players.

On 10 December 2025, BFA was recognised as an AFC One Star Academy, becoming one of the Lebanese academies accredited by the Asian Football Confederation for youth football development standards.

=== International competitions ===
BFA regularly participates in international youth tournaments, including the Gothia Cup in Sweden, which it has entered since 2007. In 2024, BFA Elite's 2013 team reached the semi-finals of the tournament and finished third in Class A, with the academy describing the achievement as the first time a Lebanese team had reached the semi-final stage of the competition.

== Women's team ==
Beirut Football Academy
- Full name: Beirut Football Academy
- Short name: BFA
- Founded: 2016; 10 years ago
- Manager: Samer Barbari
- League: Lebanese Women's Football League
- 2025–26: Lebanese Women's Football League, 2nd of 9
Home colours	Away colours

Beirut Football Academy's women's football club was founded in 2016, and competes in the Lebanese Women's Football League.

BFA were crowned league champions in the 2023–24 season, after finishing first with 18 wins out of 18 matches. They also finished runners-up in the 2020–21 Lebanese Women's FA Cup, losing on penalty shoot-outs to EFP in the final. They retained their title the following season, in 2024–25. With their league title, they qualified to participate in the 2026 WAFF Women's Clubs Championship.

=== Players ===
As of 10 May 2025

Note: Flags indicate national team as defined under FIFA eligibility rules; some limited exceptions apply. Players may hold more than one non-FIFA nationality.

No.	Pos.	Nation	Player
1	GK	LBN	Nour Hammoudy
2	DF	LBN	Yara Abi Fadel
3	DF	PLE	Pia Kassis
4	DF	LBN	Perla Medlej
5	DF	LBN	Haya Najjad
7	FW	LBN	Lea El Hajj Ali
7	FW	LBN	Hoda Hamzi
10	FW	LBN	Lama Abdine (captain)
11	FW	LBN	Lynn Moutran
12	DF	LBN	Yasmina Nassar
14	DF	LBN	Sarah El Feghali
15	MF	LBN	Noura Dawy
16	MF	LBN	Carla Abdel Khalek
17	FW	LBN	Calina Osman

No.	Pos.	Nation	Player
21	FW	LBN	Joya Issa
22	GK	LBN	Sinal Breiche
23	GK	LBN	Christa Mekdassi
24	MF	LBN	Gaelle Abou Melheb
28	MF	LBN	Diva Luna El Hajj
32	FW	LBN	Tatianna El Kaym
33	DF	LBN	Sarah Dagher
34	DF	LBN	Maria Antoun
44	GK	LBN	Ghenwa Karam
56	DF	LBN	Clea Diab
70	MF	LBN	Malak El Ali
77	DF	LBN	Lynn Bou Ghazaleh
88	MF	LBN	Nour El Khoury
95	GK	LBN	Cynthia Narkararian

=== Honours ===
- Lebanese Women's Football League
  - Champions (2): 2023–24, 2024–25
- Lebanese Women's FA Cup
  - Runners-up (1): 2020–21

== Men's team ==
In addition to its academy teams, BFA has operated BFA Sporting since 2023, a senior men's team competing in the Lebanese Third Division.

== See also ==
- BFA Sporting
- Lebanese Women's Football League
- Women's football in Lebanon
- List of women's association football clubs in Lebanon
