= 2019 WAFF Women's Championship =

6th edition of the WAFF Women's Championship

Tournament details
- Host country: Bahrain
- Dates: 7–15 January
- Teams: 5 (from 1 sub-confederation)
- Venue: 1 (in 1 host city)

Final positions
- Champions: Jordan (4th title)
- Runners-up: Bahrain
- Third place: Lebanon
- Fourth place: United Arab Emirates

Tournament statistics
- Matches played: 10
- Goals scored: 30 (3 per match)
- Top scorer: (Jordan) Raya Hina (5 goals)
- Best player: (Bahrain) Hessa Alisa
- Best goalkeeper: (United Arab Emirates) Noura Almazrooei

The 2019 WAFF Women's Championship was the sixth edition of the WAFF Women's Championship, the international women's football championship of Western Asia organised by the West Asian Football Federation (WAFF). It was held in Bahrain from 7 January to 15 January 2019. The tournament was won by Jordan for the fourth time, and Bahrain became the first host nation to not win the WAFF Women's Championship.

== Teams ==
=== Participants ===
Five teams entered the tournament.

Country	Appearance	Previous best performance	FIFA ranking December 2018
Jordan	6th	Champions (2005, 2007, 2014)	52
United Arab Emirates	3rd	Champions (2010, 2011)	92
Palestine	5th	Runners-up (2014)	106
Lebanon	3rd	Third place (2007)	134
Bahrain	5th	Third place (2010, 2011, 2014)	NR

=== Squads ===
Each team must register a squad of 23 players, minimum three of whom must be goalkeepers.

== Group stage ==
Team	Pld	W	D	L	GF	GA	GD	Pts
Jordan	4	4	0	0	11	2	+9	12
Bahrain	4	2	1	1	9	4	+5	7
Lebanon	4	2	0	2	8	6	+2	6
United Arab Emirates	4	0	2	2	2	7	−5	2
Palestine	4	0	1	3	0	11	−11	1

Source: Global Sports Archive
7 January 2019
13:00

Jordan	4–1	United Arab Emirates
Al-Adwan 45' (o.g.); Hina 63', 74'; Al-Sufy 79'	AFC Report	Juma 31'

Al Muharraq Stadium, Muharraq
7 January 2019
16:00

Bahrain	3–2	Lebanon
Licence 69'; Alisa 78', 81'	AFC Report; Report	Tamim 57'; Kasty 90+1'

Al Muharraq Stadium, Muharraq

9 January 2019
13:00

Bahrain	5–0	Palestine
Tobellah 45+1' (pen.), 75'; Alisa 56'; Ramadhan 73'; Sabkar 79'	AFC Report; Report

Al Muharraq Stadium, Muharraq
9 January 2019
16:00

Lebanon	2–0	United Arab Emirates
Mokdad 45+2'; Awad 86'	AFC Report

Al Muharraq Stadium, Muharraq

11 January 2019
13:00

Jordan	3–1	Lebanon
Hina 8'; Al-Sufy 12'; Jebreen 56'	AFC Report	Tamim 58'

Al Muharraq Stadium, Muharraq
11 January 2019
16:00

United Arab Emirates	0–0	Palestine
	AFC Report

Al Muharraq Stadium, Muharraq

13 January 2019
13:00

United Arab Emirates	1–1	Bahrain
Aladwan 35'	AFC Report	Alisa 19'

Al Muharraq Stadium, Muharraq
13 January 2019
16:00

Palestine	0–3	Jordan
	AFC Report	Al-Nahar 16'; Hina 36', 83'

Al Muharraq Stadium, Muharraq

15 January 2019
13:00

Palestine	0–3	Lebanon
	AFC Report	Tamim 7'; Jurdi 16'; Awad 23'

Al Muharraq Stadium, Muharraq
15 January 2019
16:00

Jordan	1–0	Bahrain
Al-Naber 67'	AFC Report

Al Muharraq Stadium, Muharraq

=== Champions ===
2019 WAFF Women's champions

Jordan
Fourth title

== Statistics ==
=== Goalscorers ===
There were 30 goals scored in 10 matches, for an average of 3 goals per match.

5 goals

- (Jordan) Raya Hina

4 goals

- (Bahrain) Hessa Allisa

3 goals

- (Lebanon) Hanin Tamim

2 goals

- (Jordan) Anfal Al-Sufy
- (Lebanon) Samira Awad
- (Bahrain) Yasmeen Tobellah

1 goal

- (Bahrain) Phoebe Licence
- (Bahrain) Eman Ramadhan
- (Bahrain) Leleya Sabkar
- (Jordan) Stephanie Al-Naber
- (Jordan) Abeer Al-Nahar
- (Jordan) Shahenaz Jebreen
- (Lebanon) Aya Jurdi
- (Lebanon) Dima Kasty
- (Lebanon) Rana Mokdad
- (United Arab Emirates) Naeema Juma
- (United Arab Emirates) Alanoud Al-Adwan

1 own goal

- (United Arab Emirates) Nouf Al-Adwan

=== Awards ===
Golden Boot

- (Jordan) Raya Hina

Golden Ball

- (Bahrain) Hessa Alisa

Golden Glove

- (United Arab Emirates) Noura Almazrooei
