= Zouk Mosbeh SC =

Lebanese multi-sports club in Zouk Mosbeh

Zouk Mosbeh
- Full name: Zouk Mosbeh Sporting Club
- Based in: Zouk Mosbeh
- Colors: Black and green
- President: George Al Hajj

Zouk Mosbeh Sporting Club (Arabic: نادي ذوق مصبح الرياضي), formerly Shooters Sporting Club (Arabic: نادي شوترز), is a multi-sports club based in Zouk Mosbeh, Lebanon. The club has consisted of various departments throughout their history, including futsal, women's football, table tennis, basketball, and kung fu.

Zouk Mosbeh's women's football department was founded in 2017. They competed in the Lebanese Women's Football League and won one league title and one FA Cup in the 2017–18 season, before being dissolved in 2019.

== History ==
=== Women's football ===
Zouk Mosbeh debuted in the 2017–18 season, winning the league and cup in their debut season. The following season, they came second both in the league and cup. The club was dissolved in 2019.

== Honours ==
=== Men's futsal ===
- Lebanese Futsal League Second Division
  - Winners (1): 2017–18

=== Men's basketball ===
- Lebanese Basketball League Second Division
  - Winners (1): 2014–15

=== Women's football ===
- Lebanese Women's Football League
  - Winners (1): 2017–18
- Lebanese Women's FA Cup
  - Winners (2): 2016–17, 2017–18
  - Runners-up (1): 2018–19
- Lebanese Women's Super Cup
  - Winners (2; record): 2017–18, 2018–19

=== Women's futsal ===
- Lebanese Women's Futsal League
  - Winners (1): 2017–18

== See also ==
- Women's football in Lebanon
- List of women's football clubs in Lebanon
