= Lebanese Women's Cup =

Lebanese women's top cup competition

- Founded: 2008; 18 years ago
- Region: Lebanon
- Teams: 8 (2020–21)
- Current champions: EFP (1st title)
- Most championships: Sadaka (6 titles)
- 2020–21 Lebanese Women's Cup

The Lebanese Women's Cup (Arabic: كأس لبنان للسيدات) is the top annual cup tournament for women's clubs in Lebanese football. The competition began in 2007–08, and Sadaka holds the record for most titles overall, having won six.

== List of finals ==
Year	Winners	Score	Runners up
2007–08	Sadaka	2–0	Ansar
2008–09	Sadaka	3–0	Ansar
2009–10	Sadaka	10–0	Shabab Tripoli
2010–11	Sadaka	2–0	Athletico Beirut
2011–12	Sadaka	2–0	Shabab Arabi
2012–13	Sadaka	2–1	Arabi
2013–14	SAS	6–0	Arabi
2014–15	SAS	3–0	FC Beirut
2015–16	FC Beirut	3–0	GFA
2016–17	Zouk Mosbeh	4–1	SAS
2017–18	Zouk Mosbeh	3–2	SAS
2018–19	SAS	1–0	Zouk Mosbeh
2019–20	Not held		
2020–21	EFP	2–2 (p)	BFA
2021–22	Not held		
2022–23	Not held		

=== Performance by club ===
Club	Winners	Runners-up	Winning years
Sadaka	6	0	2007–08, 2008–09, 2009–10, 2010–11, 2011–12, 2012–13
SAS	3	2	2013–14, 2014–15, 2018–19
Zouk Mosbeh	2	1	2016–17, 2017–18
FC Beirut	1	1	2015–16
EFP	1	0	2020–21
Ansar	0	2	
Arabi	0	2	
Shabab Tripoli	0	1	
Athletico Beirut	0	1	
Shabab Arabi	0	1	
GFA	0	1	
BFA	0	1	

== See also ==
- Women's football in Lebanon
- Lebanese Women's Football League
- Lebanese Women's Super Cup
