= Lebanese Women's Football League =

Women's section of association football league in Lebanon

- Organising body: Lebanese Football Association
- Founded: 1 June 2008; 18 years ago
- Country: Lebanon
- Confederation: AFC
- Number of clubs: 9
- Domestic cups: Lebanese Women's Cup; Lebanese Women's Super Cup
- International cups: AFC Women's Champions League; WAFF Women's Clubs Championship
- Current champions: No Limits (1st title) (2025–26)
- Most championships: Sadaka; SAS (7 titles each)
- Top scorer: Syntia Salha (134)
- Broadcaster(s): FIFA+
- Website: the-lfa.com
- Current: 2025–26 Lebanese Women's Football League

The Lebanese Women's Football League (Arabic: الدوري اللبناني لكرة القدم للسيدات) is the only league of women's football in Lebanon. It is run by the Lebanese Football Association and began in May 2008, with six teams participating in the debut season. As of the 2025–26 season, nine teams participate in the league.

== History ==
The first edition of the Lebanese Women's Football League was played in 2007–08. The first matchday began on 1 June 2008 and six teams participated; Sadaka won the first edition.

== Clubs ==
=== Champions ===
No.	Season	Champion
1	2007–08	Sadaka (1)
2	2008–09	Sadaka (2)
3	2009–10	Sadaka (3)
4	2010–11	Sadaka (4)
5	2011–12	Sadaka (5)
6	2012–13	Sadaka (6)
7	2013–14	Sadaka (7)
8	2014–15	SAS (1)
9	2015–16	SAS (2)
10	2016–17	SAS (3)

No.	Season	Champion
11	2017–18	Zouk Mosbeh (1)
12	2018–19	SAS (4)
13	2019–20	SAS (5)
14	2020–21	Safa (1)
15	2021–22	SAS (6)
16	2022–23	SAS (7)
17	2023–24	BFA (1)
18	2024–25	BFA (2)
19	2025–26	No Limits (1)

==== Wins by club ====
Club	Wins	Winning years
Sadaka	7	2007–08, 2008–09, 2009–10, 2010–11, 2011–12, 2012–13, 2013–14
SAS	7	2014–15, 2015–16, 2016–17, 2018–19, 2019–20, 2021–22, 2022–23
BFA	2	2023–24, 2024–25
Zouk Mosbeh	1	2017–18
Safa	1	2020–21
No Limits	1	2025–26

=== 2025–26 season ===
The following nine clubs competed in the 2025–26 season.

Club	Home city	First season	League titles	Last league title
BFA	Beirut	2016–17	2	2024–25
EFP	Zouk Mosbeh	2019–20	0	n/a
Jounieh	Jounieh	2024–25	0	n/a
Jwaya	Jwaya	2025–26	0	n/a
Mawadda Tripoli	Tripoli	2025–26	0	n/a
Nejmeh	Beirut	2025–26	0	n/a
No Limits	Jdeideh	2023–24	0	n/a
Safa Saad Barouk	Barouk	2025–26	0	n/a
Sanharib	Beirut	2025–26	0	n/a

=== Seasons in the Lebanese Women's Football League ===
There are 41 teams that have taken part in 19 Lebanese Women's Football League championships from the 2007–08 season until the 2025–26 season. The teams in bold compete in the Lebanese Women's Football League currently. The year in parentheses represents the most recent year of participation.

- 11 seasons: SAS (2024)
- 10 seasons: FC Beirut (2025), **BFA** (2026)
- 9 seasons: ÓBerytus (2025)
- 8 seasons: United Tripoli (2022)
- 7 seasons: Sadaka (2014), Salam Zgharta (2025), **EFP** (2026)
- 6 seasons: Girls (2017)
- 5 seasons: Shabab Arabi (2012), Arabi (2015), Super Girls (2024), Akhaa Ahli Aley (2025)
- 4 seasons: Southern Stars (Note: Terdeba Stars in 2019, Southern Stars in 2020, Montada Sour Sakafi in 2023) (2025)
- 3 seasons: Adab W Riyada Kfarchima (2010), Shabab Tripoli (2010), Athletico Beirut (2013), Shooters (2013), Sporting High (2019), Zouk Mosbeh (2019), Sakafi Chhim (2021), Safa (2022), Helium (2024), **No Limits** (2026)
- 2 seasons: Ansar (2009), Homenmen (2009), Jabal Sheikh (2019), Hoops (2020), Kfarchima (2020), Montada North Lebanon (2021), Primo (2021), Taadod Mazraat Chouf (2022), **Jounieh** (2026)
- 1 season: Phoenicia (2012), Nasr Hadath (2017), Jabal (2023), **Jwaya** (2026), **Mawadda Tripoli** (2026), **Nejmeh** (2026), **Safa Saad Barouk** (2026), **Sanharib** (2026)

== Players ==
=== Top scorers by season ===
Season	Player(s)	Nationality	Club(s)	Goals
2007–08	Sara Haidar	Lebanon	Sadaka	18
2008–09	Sara Haidar; Gayane Kostanyan	Lebanon; Armenia	Sadaka; Homenmen	13
2009–10	Sara Haidar	Lebanon	Sadaka	16
2010–11	Sara Haidar	Lebanon	Sadaka	22
2011–12	Sara Haidar	Lebanon	Sadaka	25
2012–13	Diakiese Kaluzodi	DR Congo	Sadaka	11
2013–14	Maysa Jbarah	Jordan	SAS	25
2014–15	Sara Bakri	Lebanon	SAS	7
2015–16	Nadia Assaf	Lebanon	GFA	9
2016–17	Nancy Tchaylian	Lebanon	Zouk Mosbeh	20
2017–18	Alice Kusi	Ghana	Zouk Mosbeh	26
2018–19	Mariam Camara	Ivory Coast	SAS	18
2019–20	Melanie Ghanime	Lebanon	EFP	20
2020–21	Syntia Salha	Lebanon	Safa	13
2021–22	Syntia Salha	Lebanon	Safa	20
2022–23	Syntia Salha	Lebanon	BFA	29
2023–24	Syntia Salha	Lebanon	BFA	40
2024–25	Nancy Tchaylian	Lebanon	ÓBerytus	8
2025–26	Ayana Rezkallah	Lebanon	EFP	21

=== All-time top scorers ===
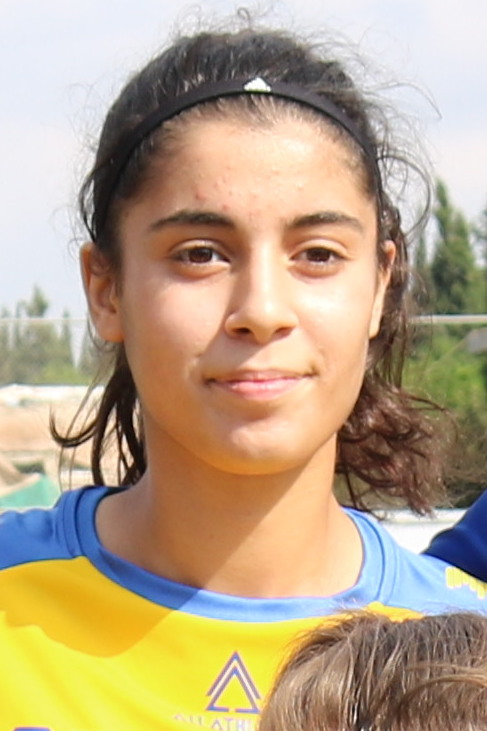
Syntia Salha is the highest goalscorer in Lebanese Women's Football League history with 134 goals.

As of 28 June 2026

Rank	Name	Goals
1	(Lebanon) Syntia Salha	134
2	(Lebanon) **Nancy Tchaylian**	129
3	(Lebanon) Sara Bakri	120
4	(Lebanon) Sara Haidar	103
5	(Lebanon) Reem Chalhoub	80
6	(Lebanon) Yara Bou Rada	75
7	(Lebanon) **Sally Mjarkash**	71
8	(Lebanon) Christy Maalouf	69
9	(Lebanon) Yara Srour	57
10	(Lebanon) **Lama Abdine**	55

Bold denotes players still playing in the Lebanese Women's Football League.

== Media coverage ==
In October 2022, the LFA and FIFA signed an agreement to broadcast all matches in the Lebanese Women's Football League through the FIFA+ platform.

== Transfer regulations ==
Players may only be transferred during transfer windows that are set by the Lebanese Football Association. The two transfer windows run from 1 February to 16 March and from 5 to 25 May.

== See also ==
- Lebanon women's national football team
- Lebanese Premier League
- Lebanese football league system
