= 2026 WAFF U-17 Women's Championship =

WAFF U-17 Women's Championship 2026
بطولة غرب آسيا السادسة للناشئات تحت 17 عاماً

Tournament details
- Host country: Jordan
- City: Zarqa
- Dates: 17–25 July 2026
- Teams: 7 (from 1 sub-confederation)
- Venue: 1 (in 1 host city)

Final positions
- Champions: Syria (2nd title)
- Runners-up: Lebanon

Tournament statistics
- Matches played: 12
- Goals scored: 44 (3.67 per match)

The 2026 WAFF U-17 Women's Championship (Arabic: بطولة غرب آسيا السادسة للناشئات تحت 17 عاماً) was the sixth edition of the WAFF U-17 Women's Championship, the international women's football youth championship of Western Asia organized by the West Asian Football Federation (WAFF). The tournament took place in Zarqa, Jordan, from 17 to 25 July, marking the country's fourth time as host.

Lebanon were the defending champions, having secured their third title in the previous edition by defeating Syria 4–0 in the final.

== Participation ==
=== Participating teams ===
On 12 May 2026, the WAFF Executive Committee approved the staging of the sixth edition with seven participating teams. While Iraq was initially confirmed to enter, they were later removed from the list and replaced by Saudi Arabia before the official draw.

Team	Appearance(s)			Previous best performance
Team	Total	First	Last	Previous best performance
Bahrain	4th	2018	2025	Fourth place (2018, January 2023, 2025)
Jordan	6th	2018	2025	Champions (2018)
Lebanon	6th	2018	2025	Champions (2019, January 2023, 2025)
Palestine	5th	2018	2025	Third place (2018, January 2023)
Saudi Arabia	2nd	2025		Group stage (2025)
Syria	5th	2018	2025	Champions (November 2023)
United Arab Emirates	2nd	2018		Fifth place (2018)

Did not enter

- Iraq
- Kuwait
- Oman
- Qatar
- Yemen

=== Draw ===
The official draw took place on 10 June 2026 at 12:00 AST (UTC+3) at the WAFF Headquarters in Amman and was streamed virtually. Hosts Jordan were automatically assigned to position B1, while defending champions Lebanon were placed in A1. An unseeded draw was used for the remaining teams to determine both their group and group position.

The draw resulted in the following groups:

Group A
Pos	Team
A1	Lebanon
A2	Syria
A3	Saudi Arabia
A4	United Arab Emirates

Group B
Pos	Team
B1	Jordan
B2	Bahrain
B3	Palestine

== Group stage ==
All times are local, AST (UTC+3).

=== Group A ===
Pos	Team	Pld	W	D	L	GF	GA	GD	Pts	Qualification
1	Syria	3	3	0	0	10	0	+10	9	Knockout stage
2	Lebanon	3	2	0	1	10	1	+9	6	Knockout stage
3	Saudi Arabia	3	1	0	2	5	3	+2	3	
4	United Arab Emirates	3	0	0	3	0	21	−21	0	

Source: WAFF
Rules for classification: 1) Points; 2) head-to-head matches; 3) Goal difference; 4) Number of goals scored.
17 July 2026
17:00

Lebanon	8–0	United Arab Emirates
Al Arab 2'; Geitani 10', 16'; A. Hajj 18'; Boustany 39'; D. Hajj 45+1', 56'; Saad 62'	Report; Report (WAFF)

Prince Mohammed Stadium, Zarqa
17 July 2026
20:00

Syria	1–0	Saudi Arabia
Mena 66'	Report; Report (WAFF)

Prince Mohammed Stadium, Zarqa

19 July 2026
17:00

United Arab Emirates	0–8	Syria
	Report; Report (WAFF)	Mena 9', 17', 66' (pen.), 71'; Issa 47'; Al-Ktaish 57'; Jomaa Ato 62'; Mashaal 64'

Prince Mohammed Stadium, Zarqa
Referee: Yasmin Nairoukh (Palestine)
19 July 2026
20:00

Saudi Arabia	0–2	Lebanon
	Report; Report (WAFF)	Boustany 3'; Geitani 23'

Prince Mohammed Stadium, Zarqa

21 July 2026
17:00

Lebanon	0–1	Syria
	Report; Report (WAFF)	Jomaa Ato 87'

Prince Mohammed Stadium, Zarqa
21 July 2026
20:00

Saudi Arabia	5–0	United Arab Emirates
Al-Duhiyan 27', 52', 62'; Al-Kaabi 50' (pen.); Al-Suhaymi 72'	Report; Report (WAFF)

Prince Mohammed Stadium, Zarqa

=== Group B ===
Pos	Team	Pld	W	D	L	GF	GA	GD	Pts	Qualification
1	Jordan (H)	2	2	0	0	7	0	+7	6	Knockout stage
2	Palestine	2	1	0	1	2	6	−4	3	Knockout stage
3	Bahrain	2	0	0	2	1	4	−3	0	

Source: WAFF
Rules for classification: 1) Points; 2) head-to-head matches; 3) Goal difference; 4) Number of goals scored.
(H) Hosts
18 July 2026
18:00

Palestine	0–5	Jordan
	Report; Report (WAFF)	Ja'ara 17', 84'; Abu Salha 28'; Haqrous 74', 77'

Prince Mohammed Stadium, Zarqa

20 July 2026
18:00

Bahrain	1–2	Palestine
Al-Aali 80'	Report	Abu-Sarhan 13'; Asad 65'

Prince Mohammed Stadium, Zarqa

22 July 2026
18:00

Jordan	2–0	Bahrain
Abu Salha 54' (pen.); Obeidat 86'	Report

Prince Mohammed Stadium, Zarqa

== Knockout stage ==
In the knockout stage, a penalty shoot-out was used to decide the winner if necessary (no extra time was played).

=== Bracket ===
Semi-finals
24 July - Zarqa
Syria	0 (6)
Palestine	0 (5)
24 July - Zarqa
Jordan	0
Lebanon	5

Final
26 July - Zarqa
Syria	2 (4)
Lebanon	2 (3)

=== Semi-finals ===
24 July 2026
17:00

Syria	0–0	Palestine
	Report
Penalties
Mena (penalty scored); Al-Ktaish (penalty scored); Jomaa Ato (penalty scored); Ebrahim (penalty missed); Zidane (penalty scored); Issa (penalty scored); Housin (penalty scored)	6–5	(penalty scored) Gamay; (penalty scored) Abu-Sarhan; (penalty scored) Phillips; (penalty missed) Jaber; (penalty scored) Salah; (penalty scored) Asad; (penalty missed) Ghneim

Prince Mohammed Stadium, Zarqa

24 July 2026
20:00

Jordan	0–5	Lebanon
	Report	Geitani 29', 56'; C. Chebly 31'; D. Hajj 60'; Saad 79'

Prince Mohammed Stadium, Zarqa

=== Final ===
26 July 2026
18:00

Syria	2–2	Lebanon
Al-Khelif 69'; Jomaa Ato 90+2'	Report	Geitani 36'; Abou Malhab 40' (pen.)
Penalties
Mena (penalty scored); Al-ktaish (penalty scored); Jomaa Ato (penalty scored); Issa (penalty missed); Ebrahim (penalty scored)	4–3	(penalty scored) Nassar; (penalty missed) C. Chebly; (penalty scored) Geitani; (penalty scored) Dib; (penalty missed) Abou Malhab

Prince Mohammed Stadium, Zarqa

== Goalscorers ==
There have been 40 goals scored in 11 matches, for an average of 3.64 goals per match (as of 24 July 2026).

5 goals

- (Syria) Masa Mena

3 goals

- (Lebanon) Yara Geitani

2 goals

- (Jordan) Ragad Haqrous
- (Jordan) Taima'a Ja'ara
- (Lebanon) Angy Boustany
- (Lebanon) Diva-Luna Hajj

1 goal

- (Jordan) Nadin Abu Salha
- (Lebanon) Lamar Arab
- (Lebanon) Acil Hajj
- (Lebanon) Sarah Saad
- (Syria) Tasneem Al-Ktaish
- (Syria) Amal Issa
- (Syria) Bayan Jomaa Ato
- (Syria) Sham Mashaal

Source: WAFF
