= 2025 WAFF U-17 Girls Championship =

WAFF U-17 Girls Championship 2025
بطولة غرب آسيا للناشئات - السعودية 2025

Tournament details
- Host country: Saudi Arabia
- City: Khobar
- Dates: 8–16 February
- Teams: 6 (from 1 confederation)
- Venue: 1 (in 1 host city)

Final positions
- Champions: Lebanon (3rd title)
- Runners-up: Syria
- Third place: Jordan
- Fourth place: Bahrain

Tournament statistics
- Matches played: 10
- Goals scored: 30 (3 per match)
- Top scorer(s): (Lebanon) Yasmin El Habbal (4 goals)
- Best player: (Lebanon) Yara Geitani
- Best goalkeeper: (Bahrain) Maya Al-Abbasi

The 2025 WAFF U-17 Girls Championship (Arabic: بطولة اتحاد غرب آسيا الخامسة للناشئات) was the fifth edition of the WAFF U-17 Girls Championship, the biennial international youth football championship organised by the West Asian Football Federation (WAFF) for the women's under-17 national teams of West Asia. It was hosted in Saudi Arabia from 8 to 16 February 2025.

Defending champions Syria, who defeated the previous edition's host Jordan 1–0 in the final, finished runners-up. Lebanon won the tournament, defeating Syria 4–0 in the final and winning their third title.

== Participation ==
=== Participating teams ===
Initially, eight out of 12 member associations entered teams for the tournament. However, Iraq and Kuwait later withdrew, bringing the total down to six teams. Of the six participants, Saudi Arabia is making its debut in the tournament.

Team	App	Last	Best placement in the tournament
Bahrain	3rd	Jan 2023	Fourth Place (2018, Jan 2023)
Jordan	5th	Nov 2023	Champions (2018)
Lebanon	5th	Nov 2023	Champions (2019, Jan 2023)
Palestine	4th	Jan 2023	Third Place (2018, Jan 2023)
Saudi Arabia	1st	—N/a	Debut
Syria	4th	Nov 2023	Champions (Nov 2023)

Did not enter

- Iraq (W)
- Kuwait (W)
- Oman
- Qatar
- United Arab Emirates
- Yemen

=== Draw ===
The official draw was held on 6 January 2025 at the WAFF Headquarters in Amman at 12:00 (UTC+3). The host team, Saudi Arabia, was automatically seeded and placed in position A1, while the title holders, Syria, were also automatically seeded and assigned to position B1.

The draw resulted in the following groups:

Group A
Pos	Team
A1	Saudi Arabia
A2	Bahrain
A3	Jordan

Group B
Pos	Team
B1	Syria
B2	Palestine
B3	Lebanon

=== Squads ===
Players born between 1 January 2008 and 31 December 2010 were eligible to compete in the tournament. Each team must register a squad of minimum 18 players and maximum 23 players, minimum three of whom must be goalkeepers

== Venue ==
The tournament took place in Khobar, a coastal city in the Eastern Province, with the following stadium used for all matches:

2025 WAFF U-17 Girls Championship is located in Saudi Arabia	Khobar
2025 WAFF U-17 Girls Championship is located in Saudi Arabia	Prince Saud bin Jalawi Stadium
2025 WAFF U-17 Girls Championship is located in Saudi Arabia	Capacity: 20,000

== Group stage ==
All times are local, SAST (UTC+3).

Tiebreakers

Teams were ranked according to points (3 points for a win, 1 point for a draw, 0 points for a loss), and should they tied on points, the following tiebreaking criteria were applied, in the order given, to determine the rankings:

1. Points in head-to-head matches among tied teams;
2. Goal difference in head-to-head matches among tied teams;
3. Goals scored in head-to-head matches among tied teams;
4. Should more than two teams were tied, and after applying all head-to-head criteria above, a subset of teams were still tied, all head-to-head criteria above were reapplied exclusively to this subset of teams;
5. Goal difference in all group matches;
6. Goals scored in all group matches;
7. Penalty shoot-out if only two teams are tied and they meet in the last round of the group;
8. Disciplinary points (yellow card = 1 point, red card as a result of two yellow cards = 3 points, direct red card = 3 points, yellow card followed by direct red card = 4 points);
9. Drawing of lots.

=== Group A ===
Pos	Team	Pld	W	D	L	GF	GA	GD	Pts	Qualification
1	Jordan	2	2	0	0	8	0	+8	6	Knockout stage
2	Bahrain	2	1	0	1	1	5	−4	3	Knockout stage
3	Saudi Arabia (H)	2	0	0	2	0	4	−4	0	

Source: WAFF
Rules for classification: Group stage tiebreakers
(H) Hosts
8 February 2025
19:15

Jordan	3–0	Saudi Arabia
Jarrar 8'; Abu Ali 12'; Abu Hazeem 43'	Report

Prince Saud bin Jalawi Stadium, Khobar
Referee: Khuloud Al-Zaabi (United Arab Emirates)

10 February 2025
15:15

Bahrain	0–5	Jordan
	Report	Abu Ali 23', 55'; D'mour 26'; Jarrar 49'; Abu Hazeem 59'

Prince Saud bin Jalawi Stadium, Khobar
Referee: Mohammed Barahma (Palestine)

12 February 2025
19:15

Saudi Arabia	0–1	Bahrain
	Report	Hasan 47'

Prince Saud bin Jalawi Stadium, Khobar
Referee: Doumouh Al Bakkar (Lebanon)

=== Group B ===
Pos	Team	Pld	W	D	L	GF	GA	GD	Pts	Qualification
1	Lebanon	2	2	0	0	6	0	+6	6	Knockout stage
2	Syria	2	1	0	1	6	2	+4	3	Knockout stage
3	Palestine	2	0	0	2	0	10	−10	0	

Source: WAFF
Rules for classification: Group stage tiebreakers
8 February 2025
15:15

Lebanon	2–0	Syria
Moghrabi 51'; Issa 61'	Report

Prince Saud bin Jalawi Stadium, Khobar
Referee: Haneen Murad (Jordan)

10 February 2025
19:15

Palestine	0–4	Lebanon
	Report	Frangieh 17'; Moslemani 46', 81'; El Habbal 62'

Prince Saud bin Jalawi Stadium, Khobar
Referee: Alesar Baddour (Syria)

12 February 2025
15:15

Syria	6–0	Palestine
Baddour 1'; Alloush 49'; Salwayeh 52', 67', 75'; Harb 60'	Report

Prince Saud bin Jalawi Stadium, Khobar
Referee: Maryam Ali (Bahrain)

== Knockout stage ==
In the knockout stage, a penalty shoot-out was used to decide the winner if necessary (no extra time was played).

=== Bracket ===
Semi-finals
14 February - Khobar
Lebanon	3
Bahrain	0
14 February - Khobar
Jordan	0 (6)
Syria (p)	0 (7)

Final
16 February - Khobar
Lebanon	4
Syria	0
Third place
16 February - Khobar
Bahrain	0
Jordan	2

=== Semi-finals ===
14 February 2025
15:30

Lebanon	3–0	Bahrain
Issa 10'; Geitani 46'; Habbal 54'	Report

Prince Saud bin Jalawi Stadium, Khobar
Referee: Reem Al-Dossary (Saudi Arabia)

14 February 2025
19:30

Jordan	0–0	Syria
	Report
Penalties
Abu Ali (penalty scored); Issa (penalty scored); Salamhe (penalty scored); Abu Salha (penalty scored); Hammad (penalty scored); D'mour (penalty scored); Kamal (penalty missed)	6–7	(penalty scored) Baddour; (penalty scored) Harb; (penalty scored) Deeb; (penalty scored) Alloush; (penalty scored) Sakkour; (penalty scored) Jomaa Ato; (penalty scored) Mena

Prince Saud bin Jalawi Stadium, Khobar
Referee: Jamal Huseen (Kuwait)

=== Third place play-off ===
16 February 2025
15:30

Bahrain	0–2	Jordan
	Report	Jarrar 19'; Abu Hazeem 43'

Prince Saud bin Jalawi Stadium, Khobar

=== Final ===
16 February 2025
19:30

Lebanon	4–0	Syria
Habbal 29', 49'; Geitani 55'; Issa 57'	Report

Prince Saud bin Jalawi Stadium, Khobar

== Goalscorers ==
There were 30 goals scored in 10 matches, for an average of 3 goals per match.

4 goals

- (Lebanon) Yasmin Habbal

3 goals

- (Jordan) Haya Abu Ali
- (Jordan) Dana Abu Hazeem
- (Jordan) Mira Jarrar
- (Lebanon) Sara Issa
- (Syria) Alma Salwayeh

2 goals

- (Lebanon) Yara Geitani
- (Lebanon) Zahraa Moslemani

1 goal

- (Bahrain) Fatima Hasan
- (Jordan) Layan D'mour
- (Lebanon) Gianna Frangieh
- (Lebanon) Rama Moghrabi
- (Syria) Joudi Alloush
- (Syria) Nivin Baddour
- (Syria) Tala Harb

Source: WAFF
