= Racha Yaghi =

Lebanese footballer (born 2002)

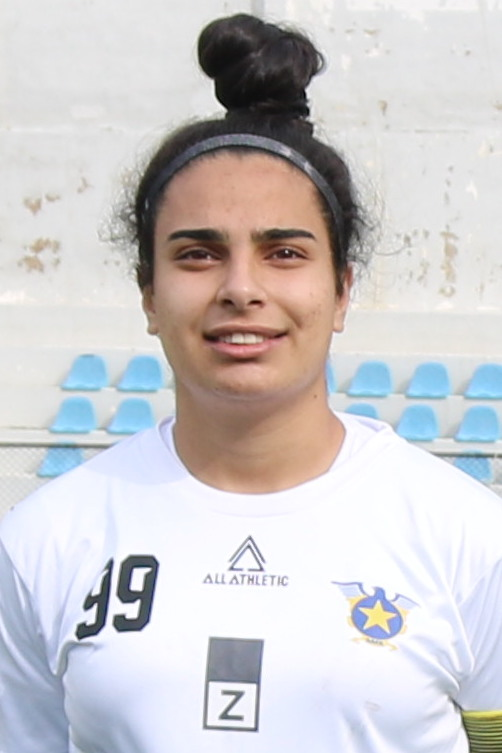
- Yaghi with Safa in 2021

Personal information
- Full name: Racha Mohammad Yaghi
- Date of birth: 10 June 2002 (age 24)
- Place of birth: Baalbek, Lebanon
- Position: Goalkeeper

Team information
- Current team: BFA
- Number: 1

Senior career*
Years	Team	Apps	(Gls)
2018–2019	Akhaa Ahli Aley		
2019–2022	Safa	11	(0)
2022	Geroskipou	8	(0)
2023	Lakatamia	9	(0)
2023	SAS	8	(0)
2023–2024	Lakatamia	14	(0)
2024	FC Beirut	8	(0)
2025–	BFA	4	(0)

International career^{‡}
2018–2019	Lebanon U19	6	(0)
2018–2023	Lebanon	17	(0)
Medal record
Women's football
Representing Lebanon
WAFF Women's Championship
Silver medal – second place	2022
Bronze medal – third place	2019
WAFF U-18 Girls Championship
Gold medal – first place	2019	U-18 Team
- * Club domestic league appearances and goals as of 22 February 2026 ‡ National team caps and goals as of 23:39, 18 July 2023 (UTC)

Racha Mohammad Yaghi (Arabic: رشا محمد ياغي; born 10 June 2002) is a Lebanese footballer who plays as a goalkeeper for Lebanese club BFA.

Yaghi has represented Lebanon at both youth and senior international levels, winning the 2019 WAFF U-18 Girls Championship and finishing as runner-up in the 2022 WAFF Women's Championship.

== Club career ==
Yaghi began her senior club career with Akhaa Ahli Aley, before joining Safa in 2019. She kept four clean sheets in eight games in the 2019–20 season, and helped Safa win the Lebanese Women's Football League in the 2020–21 season.

In September 2022, Yaghi moved to Cyprus after signing a one-season contract with Geroskipou, which competed in the country's top division. She made eight appearances for the club in the first phase of the 2022–23 Cypriot First Division, starting all eight matches.

On 31 January 2023, Yaghi moved to fellow Cypriot side Lakatamia. She made nine appearances in the second phase of the Cypriot league, playing every match for the club during that period. Later in 2023, she returned to Lebanon to join SAS, with whom she won the 2022–23 Lebanese Women's Football League.

Yaghi subsequently returned to Cyprus for another spell with Lakatamia, before joining FC Beirut in 2024. In December 2025, she joined BFA.

== International career ==
=== Youth ===
Yaghi was involved in Lebanon's youth national-team setup from an early age. In a 2014 interview with Sayidaty, she was profiled as a 12-year-old goalkeeper for the Lebanese youth national team. She spoke about the responsibility of playing in goal and explained that she preferred the position because she enjoyed protecting her team from conceding goals.

In 2018, Yaghi represented Lebanon in the 2018 WAFF U-15 Girls Championship, where she started in the final against Jordan. Despite Lebanon's defeat, she was named the tournament's best goalkeeper. She was also part of the Lebanon under-18 team that won the 2019 WAFF U-18 Girls Championship in Bahrain, defeating the hosts 3–0 in the final.

Yaghi was subsequently included in the Lebanon under-19 squad for a training camp in Egypt in December 2020, which included two friendly matches against Egypt's under-19 team.

=== Senior ===
Yaghi made her senior international debut for Lebanon in 2018. She was part of the squad that finished third at the 2019 WAFF Women's Championship and later represented Lebanon at the 2022 WAFF Women's Championship, where the team finished as runners-up.

== Honours ==
Safa

- WAFF Women's Clubs Championship: 2022
- Lebanese Women's Football League: 2020–21

SAS

- Lebanese Women's Football League: 2022–23

Lebanon U18

- WAFF U-18 Girls Championship: 2019

Lebanon

- WAFF Women's Championship runner-up: 2022; third place: 2019

Individual

- WAFF U-15 Girls Championship: 2018

== See also ==
- List of Lebanon women's international footballers
