= 2023 WAFF U-17 Girls Championship =

Women's national youth association football tournament

2023 WAFF U-17 Women's Championship
بطولة اتحاد غرب آسيا الرابعة للناشئات

Tournament details
- Host country: Jordan
- City: Zarqa
- Dates: 9–15 November
- Teams: 4 (from 1 sub-confederation)
- Venue: 1 (in 1 host city)

Final positions
- Champions: Syria (1st title)
- Runners-up: Jordan
- Third place: Lebanon
- Fourth place: Iraq

Tournament statistics
- Matches played: 8
- Goals scored: 25 (3.13 per match)
- Top scorer(s): (Lebanon) Lea El Hage Ali (3 goals)
- Best player: (Syria) Mai AlJany
- Best goalkeeper: (Jordan) Cileen Seif

The 2023 WAFF U-17 Girls Championship was the fourth edition of the WAFF U-17 Girls Championship, the international women's football youth championship of Western Asia organized by the West Asian Football Federation (WAFF). The final tournament was originally scheduled to be held in Lebanon. However, the tournament was relocated to Jordan due to the adjacent Gaza war.

Lebanon were two-time defending champions, having won the last two editions, but failed to defend their title, falling short of the final. Instead, they played in the third-place match and secured the bronze medal. On the other hand, Syria were crowned champions after defeating hosts Jordan 1–0 in the final. This marked Syria's first-ever major title in women's football across all age categories.

== Participation ==
=== Participating teams ===
Initially, five teams entered the tournament. Iraq and Kuwait were set to debut in the tournament however the latter withdrew due to security concerns.

Team	App	Last	Best placement in the tournament
Iraq	1st	—N/a	Debut
Jordan	4th	2023	Champions (2018)
~~Kuwait~~	~~1st~~	—N/a	~~Debut~~
Lebanon	4th	2023	Champions (2019, 2023)
Syria	3rd	2019	Third Place (2018)

Did not enter

- Bahrain
- Oman
- Qatar
- Palestine
- Saudi Arabia
- United Arab Emirates
- Yemen

=== Draw ===
The official draw took place on 31 October 2023 at the WAFF Headquarters in Amman, Jordan.

The draw resulted in the following order:

Pos	Team
A1	Jordan
A2	Syria
A3	Iraq
A4	Lebanon

== Venues ==
In October 2023, WAFF confirmed that Prince Mohammed Stadium would host the tournament matches.

2023 WAFF U-17 Girls Championship is located in Jordan	Zarqa
2023 WAFF U-17 Girls Championship is located in Jordan	Prince Mohammed Stadium
2023 WAFF U-17 Girls Championship is located in Jordan	Capacity: 3,800

== Match officials ==
Referees

- (Iraq) Ahmed Gatea
- (Jordan) Haneen Murad
- (Lebanon) Hanine Merhi
- (Palestine) Muath Owfi
- (Syria) Alesar Baddour

Assistant referees

- (Jordan) Sabreen Alabadi
- (Lebanon) Perissa Nasr
- (Palestine) Rafat Roma
- (Syria) Roba Zarka

== Group stage ==
All times are local, AST (UTC+3).

Pos	Team	Pld	W	D	L	GF	GA	GD	Pts	Final result
1	Jordan (H)	3	2	1	0	8	1	+7	7	Advance to final
2	Syria	3	1	2	0	5	1	+4	5	Advance to final
3	Lebanon	3	1	1	1	9	3	+6	4	Advance to third place play-off
4	Iraq	3	0	0	3	0	17	−17	0	Advance to third place play-off

Source: WAFF
Rules for classification: Group stage tiebreakers
(H) Hosts
9 November 2023
17:00

Syria	4–0	Iraq
Alshemali 16'; K. Ibrahim 29'; Dayoub 71'; AlJany 81'	Report (WAFF)

Prince Mohammed Stadium, Zarqa
Referee: Hanine Merhi (Lebanon)
9 November 2023
20:00

Jordan	2–1	Lebanon
N. Ahmad 2'; Shqair 84'	Report (WAFF)	Daher 83'

Prince Mohammed Stadium, Zarqa
Referee: Muath Owfi (Palestine)

11 November 2023
17:00

Lebanon	1–1	Syria
Raed 71' (pen.)	Report (WAFF)	A. Mohammad 25'

Prince Mohammed Stadium, Zarqa
Referee: Ahmed Gatea (Iraq)
11 November 2023
20:00

Iraq	0–6	Jordan
	Report (WAFF)	Shqair 8'; Marar 21'; M. Awadallah 30'; Abu Ali 35'; Ma'touq 77', 85'

Prince Mohammed Stadium, Zarqa
Referee: Alesar Baddour (Syria)

13 November 2023
17:00

Iraq	0–7	Lebanon
	Report (WAFF)	El Hage Ali 35', 70'; Abou Khalil 45'; Mansour 51'; Iskandar 56'; Hachem 62'; Rezkallah 73'

Prince Mohammed Stadium, Zarqa
13 November 2023
20:00

Jordan	0–0	Syria
	Report (WAFF)

Prince Mohammed Stadium, Zarqa

== Knockout stage ==
Final
15 November - Zarqa
Jordan	0
Syria	1
Third place play-off
15 November - Zarqa
Lebanon	2
Iraq	0

=== Third place play-off ===
15 November 2023
17:00

Lebanon	2–0	Iraq
Chaptini 1'; El Hage Ali 66'	Report (WAFF)

Prince Mohammed Stadium, Zarqa
Referee: Muath Owfi (Palestine)

=== Final ===
15 November 2023
20:00

Jordan	0–1	Syria
	Report (WAFF)	A. Mohammad 76'

Prince Mohammed Stadium, Zarqa
Referee: Ahmed Gatea (Iraq)

== Goalscorers ==
There were 25 goals scored in 8 matches, for an average of 3.12 goals per match.

3 goals

- (Lebanon) Lea El Hage Ali

2 goals

- (Jordan) Janna Ma'touq
- (Jordan) Khitam Shaqir
- (Syria) Aya Mohammad

1 goal

- (Jordan) Nour Ahmad
- (Jordan) Hala Marar
- (Jordan) Maya Awadallah
- (Jordan) Haya Abu Ali
- (Lebanon) Tia Rita Daher
- (Lebanon) Waed Raed
- (Lebanon) Nagham Abou Khalil
- (Lebanon) Serena Mansour
- (Lebanon) Cecile Iskandar
- (Lebanon) Lea Hachem
- (Lebanon) Ayana Rezkallah
- (Lebanon) Yara Chaptini
- (Syria) Aya Alshemali
- (Syria) Khadija Ibrahim
- (Syria) Hayat Dayoub
- (Syria) Mai AlJany

Source: WAFF
