= Sophie Fayad =

Lebanese footballer (born 2004)

Personal information
- Full name: Sophie Sayed Fayad
- Date of birth: 8 December 2004 (age 21)
- Place of birth: Batroun, Lebanon
- Position: Midfielder

Team information
- Current team: EFP
- Number: 8

Youth career
- Salam Zghata

Senior career*
Years	Team	Apps	(Gls)
2019–	EFP	41	(24)

International career^{‡}
2018	Lebanon U15		(0)
2018	Lebanon U16	4	(2)
2023	Lebanon U17		(0)
2019–2022	Lebanon U18		(1)
2023	Lebanon U20	6	(2)
2022–2023	Lebanon	8	(2)
2025–	Lebanon (futsal)		
Medal record
Women's football
Representing Lebanon
WAFF Women's Championship
Silver medal – second place	2022
WAFF U-18 Girls Championship
Gold medal – first place	2019	U-18 Team
Gold medal – first place	2022	U-18 Team
WAFF U-15 Girls Championship
Silver medal – second place	2018	U-15 Team
- * Club domestic league appearances and goals as of 13:33, 26 February 2025 (UTC) ‡ National team caps and goals as of 13:33, 26 February 2025 (UTC)

Sophie Sayed Fayad (Arabic: صوفي سيد فياض; born 8 December 2004) is a Lebanese football and futsal player who plays as midfielder for Lebanese club EFP.

== Club career ==
A youth player for Salam Zghata, Fayad played as a starter in the under-17 championship aged just 12; she helped her side finish second and scored 10 goals in 2017.

== International career ==
=== Youth ===
Fayad represented Lebanon at various youth levels. In 2018, she played for the Lebanon U15 team at the WAFF U-15 Girls Championship. The following year, she competed with the Lebanon U16 squad during the 2019 AFC U-16 Women's Championship qualification. She went on to play with the Lebanon U17 team, participating in the 2024 AFC U-17 Women's Asian Cup qualification.

In 2019, she was part of the Lebanon U18 team that won the WAFF U-18 Girls Championship in Bahrain. Notably, she was the youngest player in the squad at just 15 years old. She won her second regional title at the 2022 WAFF U-18 Girls Championship. In 2023, Fayad played for Lebanon U20 at the 2024 AFC U-20 Women's Asian Cup qualification.

=== Senior ===
Fayad made her senior debut for Lebanon on 12 August 2022 against Syria. She was called up for the 2022 WAFF Women's Championship, in which Lebanon finished second, and scored in the opening match against Palestine. On 18 July 2023, she scored another goal against Palestine in 5–0 friendly victory.

=== Futsal ===
In addition to football, Fayad has represented Lebanon in futsal. She played for the national futsal team during the 2025 AFC Women's Futsal Asian Cup qualification.

== Career statistics ==
=== International ===
Scores and results list Lebanon's goal tally first, score column indicates score after each Fayad goal.

List of international goals scored by Sophie Fayad
No.	Date	Venue	Opponent	Score	Result	Competition
1	29 August 2022	Petra Stadium, Amman, Jordan	Palestine	1–0	3–0	2022 WAFF Championship
2	18 July 2023	Ansar Stadium, Ansar, Lebanon	Palestine	4–0	5–0	Friendly

== Honours ==
EFP

- Lebanese Women's FA Cup: 2020–21
- Lebanese Women's Super Cup runner-up: 2021–22

Lebanon

- WAFF Women's Championship runner-up: 2022

Lebanon U18

- WAFF U-18 Girls Championship: 2019, 2022

Lebanon U15

- WAFF U-15 Girls Championship runner-up: 2018

== See also ==
- List of Lebanon women's international footballers
