= 2023 WAFF U-16 Girls Championship =

بطولة اتحاد غرب آسيا الثالثة للناشئات الأردن ٢٠٢٣

Tournament details
- Host country: Jordan
- City: Aqaba
- Dates: 4–10 January
- Teams: 4 (from 1 sub-confederation)
- Venue: 1 (in 1 host city)

Final positions
- Champions: Lebanon (2nd title)
- Runners-up: Jordan
- Third place: Palestine
- Fourth place: Bahrain

Tournament statistics
- Matches played: 8
- Goals scored: 17 (2.13 per match)
- Top scorer: (Lebanon) Cecile Iskandar (4 goals)
- Best player: (Jordan) Arwa Batayneh
- Best goalkeeper: (Lebanon) Marcelle Skaiki

The 2023 WAFF U-16 Girls Championship (Arabic: بطولة اتحاد غرب آسيا الثالثة للناشئات ٢٠٢٣) was the third edition of the WAFF U-16 Girls Championship (including previous editions of the WAFF U-15 Girls Championship), the biennial international youth football championship organised by West Asian Football Federation (WAFF) for the women's under-16 national teams of West Asia. It was held in Aqaba, Jordan from 4 to 10 January 2023. A total of four teams competed in the tournament.

Lebanon were the defending champions, having won the previous edition in 2019 and successfully retained their title by defeating hosts Jordan in the final.

== Participation ==
=== Participating teams ===
Four (out of 12) teams entered the Championship. Bahrain returned to the tournament after missing the 2019 edition, while Jordan, Lebanon, and Palestine maintained their streak of appearing in every edition.

| Team | App | Last | Best placement in the tournament |
|---|---|---|---|
| Bahrain | 2nd | 2018 | Fourth Place (2018) |
| Jordan | 3rd | 2019 | Champions (2018) |
| Lebanon | 3rd | 2019 | Champions (2019) |
| Palestine | 3rd | 2019 | Third Place (2018) |

Did not enter

- Iraq
- Kuwait
- Oman
- Qatar
- Saudi Arabia
- Syria
- United Arab Emirates
- Yemen

=== Draw ===
The official draw took place on 20 December 2022, 11:00 local time AST (UTC+3) at the WAFF Headquarters in Amman, Jordan.

The draw resulted in the following order:

| Pos | Team |
|---|---|
| A1 | Jordan |
| A2 | Lebanon |
| A3 | Bahrain |
| A4 | Palestine |

== Venues ==
On 14 December 2022, WAFF confirmed that Al-Aqaba Stadium would host the tournament matches.

| 2023 WAFF U-16 Girls Championship is located in Jordan | Aqaba |
|---|---|
| 2023 WAFF U-16 Girls Championship is located in Jordan | Al-Aqaba Stadium |
| 2023 WAFF U-16 Girls Championship is located in Jordan | Capacity: 3,800 |

== Match officials ==
Referees

- (Jordan) Haneen Murad
- (Lebanon) Doumouh Al Bakkar

Assistant referees

- (United Arab Emirates) Amal Jama Badhafari
- (Jordan) Islam Al-Abadi

== Group stage ==
All times are local, AST (UTC+3).

| Pos | Team | Pld | W | D | L | GF | GA | GD | Pts | Final result |
|---|---|---|---|---|---|---|---|---|---|---|
| 1 | Lebanon | 3 | 2 | 1 | 0 | 8 | 1 | +7 | 7 | Advance to final |
| 2 | Jordan (H) | 3 | 1 | 2 | 0 | 2 | 1 | +1 | 5 | Advance to final |
| 3 | Palestine | 3 | 1 | 1 | 1 | 2 | 5 | −3 | 4 | Advance to third place play-off |
| 4 | Bahrain | 3 | 0 | 0 | 3 | 0 | 5 | −5 | 0 | Advance to third place play-off |

Source: WAFF
Rules for classification: Group stage tiebreakers
(H) Hosts
4 January 2023
16:00

| Lebanon | 2–0 | Bahrain |
|---|---|---|
| Iskandar 31', 90+5' | Report; Report (WAFF) |

Al-Aqaba Stadium, Aqaba
Referee: Haneen Murad (Jordan)
4 January 2023
19:00

| Jordan | 0–0 | Palestine |
|---|---|---|
| | Report; Report (WAFF) |

Al-Aqaba Stadium, Aqaba

6 January 2023
16:00

| Palestine | 0–5 | Lebanon |
|---|---|---|
| | Report; Report (WAFF) | Hamdar 19'; El Hage Ali 22'; Abou Khalil 34'; Iskandar 45+5'; Shabtini 90+4' |

Al-Aqaba Stadium, Aqaba
6 January 2023
19:00

| Bahrain | 0–1 | Jordan |
|---|---|---|
| | Report; Report (WAFF) | Ma'touq 14' |

Al-Aqaba Stadium, Aqaba
Referee: Doumouh Al Bakkar (Lebanon)

8 January 2023
16:00

| Bahrain | 0–2 | Palestine |
|---|---|---|
| | Report; Report (WAFF) | Gabi 25'; Qodsi 67' |

Al-Aqaba Stadium, Aqaba
8 January 2023
19:00

| Jordan | 1–1 | Lebanon |
|---|---|---|
| AlKhashook 67' | Report; Report (WAFF) | Shabtini 26' |

Al-Aqaba Stadium, Aqaba

== Knockout stage ==
Final
10 January - Aqaba
Lebanon | 2
Jordan | 0
Third place play-off
10 January - Aqaba
Palestine | 2
Bahrain | 1

=== Third place play-off ===
10 January 2023
16:00

| Palestine | 2–1 | Bahrain |
|---|---|---|
| Gabi 26'; Bahbah 87' | Report (WAFF) | Ellen 80' |

Al-Aqaba Stadium, Aqaba

=== Final ===
10 January 2023
19:00

| Lebanon | 2–0 | Jordan |
|---|---|---|
| Iskandar 28'; El Hage Ali 60' |

Al-Aqaba Stadium, Aqaba

== Goalscorers ==
There were 17 goals scored in 8 matches, for an average of 2.12 goals per match.

4 goals

- (Lebanon) Cecile Iskandar

2 goals

- (Lebanon) Lea El Hage Ali
- (Lebanon) Yara Shabtini
- (Palestine) Tala Gabi

1 goal

- (Bahrain) Hannah Ellen
- (Jordan) Rama AlKhashook
- (Jordan) Janna Ma'touq
- (Lebanon) Nagham Abou Khalil
- (Lebanon) Yasmine Hamdar
- (Palestine) Natal Bahbah
- (Palestine) Rand Qodsi

Source: WAFF
