= Leleya Sabkar =

Bahraini footballer (born 2002)

Personal information
- Full name: Leleya Jaweed Abdulhusain Ali Sabkar
- Date of birth: 15 July 2002 (age 24)
- Place of birth: Manama, Bahrain
- Position: Midfielder

Team information
- Current team: United Eagles

Senior career*
Years	Team	Apps	(Gls)
2021–2022	Al Mamlaka		
2023–	United Eagles		

International career^{‡}
2016	Bahrain U14	3	(7)
2019–2020	Bahrain U18	4	(2)
2017–	Bahrain	8	(2)
2019–	Bahrain (futsal)	20	(3)
- * Club domestic league appearances and goals ‡ National team caps and goals as of June 11, 2024

Leleya Jaweed Abdulhusain Ali Sabkar (Arabic: ليليا جاويد عبد الحسين علي سبكار; born 15 July 2002) is a Bahraini professional footballer and futsal player who plays as a midfielder for Saudi Women's First Division League club United Eagles FC and the Bahrain national team.

== Club career ==
Sabkar featured in the first edition of the SAFF Women's National Football Championship with Al Mamlaka, who were crowned as the champions of the kingdom.

On 4 October 2024, United Eagles announced the renewal of her contract for one more season.

== International career ==
=== Youth ===
In 2016, Sabkar was selected to represent the Bahrain under-14 national team at the AFC U-14 Girls' Regional Championship (West). She scored seven goals in three matches, ending the tournament as the second-highest scorer and being named the tournament's best player. In December 2019, she featured for Bahrain in the WAFF U-18 Girls Championship, held in the kingdom. She scored a brace against Kuwait on the opening matchday, with Bahrain finishing the tournament as runners-up.

=== Senior ===
In 2019, Sabkar made the Bahrain squad for the 2019 WAFF Women's Championship held on home soil. During the tournament, she scored her first international goal in the 79th minute against Palestine.

=== International goals ===
As of 11 June 2024
Scores and results list Bahrain's goal tally first, score column indicates score after each Sabkar goal.

List of international goals scored by Leleya Sabkar
No.	Date	Venue	Opponent	Score	Result	Competition
1	9 January 2019	Al Muharraq Stadium, Al Muharraq, Bahrain	Palestine	5–0	5–0	2019 WAFF Women's Championship
2	8 June 2024	Al Ahli Stadium, Manama, Bahrain	Indonesia	1–3	2–3	Friendly
3	2 July 2025	Thuwunna Stadium, Yangon, Myanmar	Turkmenistan	1–1	2–2	2026 AFC Women's Asian Cup qualification

== Honours ==
Bahrain

- WAFF Women's Championship:
  - Runner-up: 2019 WAFF Women's Championship

Bahrain U18

- WAFF U-18 Girls Championship:
  - Runner-up: 2019

Bahrain Futsal

- GCC Games:
  - (gold) Gold Medalist: 2022
- WAFF Women's Futsal Championship:
  - Third place: 2022
