= Christy Maalouf =

Lebanese footballer (born 2005)

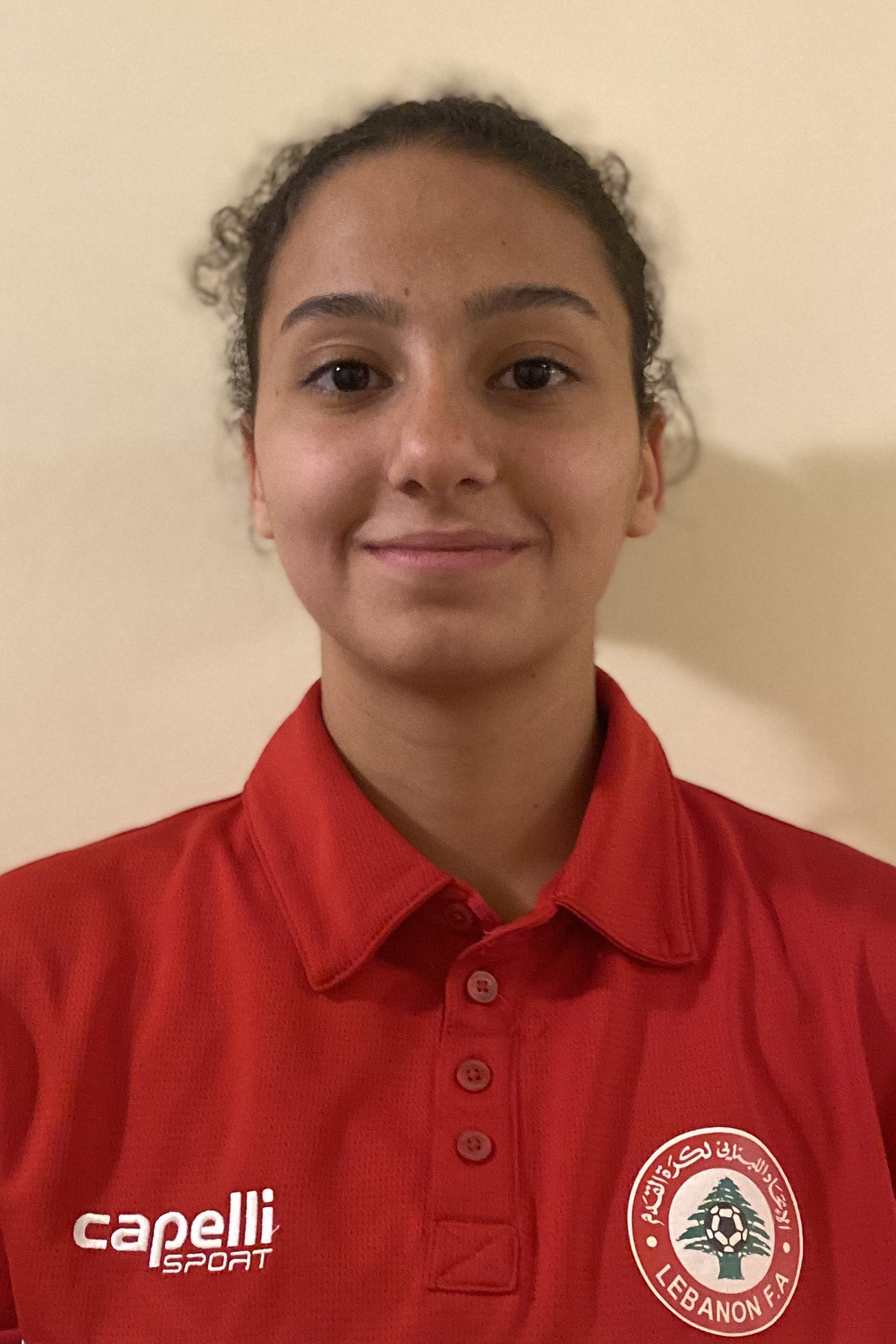
- Maalouf in 2022

Personal information
- Full name: Christy Tony Maalouf
- Date of birth: 20 December 2005 (age 20)
- Place of birth: Ghadir, Lebanon
- Height: 1.74 m (5 ft 9 in)
- Position: Forward

Team information
- Current team: Paris FC 2
- Number: 9

Youth career
- Jeita Country Club

Senior career*
Years	Team	Apps	(Gls)
2018–2019	Zouk Mosbeh		(15)
2019–2023	EFP	34+	(54)
2024	Paris FC 2	8	(5)
2024–2026	VGA Saint-Maur	31	(18)
2026–	Paris FC 2	3	(5)

International career^{‡}
2018–2019	Lebanon U15		(13)
2018	Lebanon U16	3	(1)
2022	Lebanon U18		(6)
2023	Lebanon U20		(6)
2021–	Lebanon	33	(18)
Medal record
Women's football
Representing Lebanon
WAFF Women's Championship
Silver medal – second place	2022
WAFF U-18 Girls Championship
Gold medal – first place	2022	U-18 Team
WAFF U-15 Girls Championship
Gold medal – first place	2019	U-15 Team
Silver medal – second place	2018	U-15 Team
- * Club domestic league appearances and goals as of 26 September 2026 ‡ National team caps and goals as of 13 October 2026

Christy Tony Maalouf (Arabic: كريستي توني معلوف; born 20 December 2005) is a Lebanese footballer who plays as forward for French club Paris FC 2 and the Lebanon national team.

== Club career ==
=== Lebanon ===
Maalouf began her career at the Jeita Country Club, later moving to Zouk Mosbeh. With 15 goals, she was the second-highest scorer of the 2018–19 season. She then joined EFP, where she scored a total of 55 goals across all competitions between 2019 and 2023.

=== Paris FC 2 ===
In January 2024, midway through the 2023–24 season, Maalouf moved to France and signed with Paris FC, playing for the club's reserve team in the Régional 1, the fourth tier of French women's football. She made her debut on 27 January as a starter in a 1–1 draw against Fleury's reserve team. Maalouf scored five goals in eight appearances in 2023–24.

=== VGA Saint-Maur ===
Ahead of the 2024–25 season, Maalouf joined VGA Saint-Maur, another Régional 1 club. She won three titles with the club that season: the Régional 1 Île-de-France championship, securing promotion to Division 3; the Coupe de Paris, in which she scored in the final against Sarcelles; and the Coupe du Val-de-Marne. Maalouf finished the season with 14 goals in 16 games in all competitions.

During the 2025–26 Division 3 season, Maalouf scored seven goals and provided four assists in 19 games, including two goals and three assists in a 7–0 win over US Orléans on 26 April 2026. She helped her side avoid relegation and win a second consecutive Coupe de Paris. Maalouf departed the club in July 2026.

=== Return to Paris FC 2 ===
Maalouf returned to Paris FC 2 for the 2026–27 Régional 1 season.

== International career ==
=== Youth ===
Maalouf played for Lebanon U15 at the 2019 WAFF U-15 Championship, winning the tournament as the top scorer with nine goals in two games. She also won the 2022 WAFF U-18 Championship with Lebanon U18 as the tournament's best player.

=== Senior ===
Maalouf made her senior international debut for Lebanon on 24 August 2021, as a starter in a 0–0 draw against Tunisia in the 2021 Arab Women's Cup. She scored her first goal on 30 August, in a 5–1 win against Sudan. Maalouf scored three goals in two friendly games against Syria, on 12 and 14 August 2022, including a brace in the second game. She took part in the 2022 WAFF Women's Championship; Lebanon finished as runners-up, with Maalouf scoring twice against Palestine and Syria.

With her goal against Indonesia in a 5–0 win at the 2024 AFC Women's Olympic Qualifying Tournament, on 8 April 2023, Maalouf reached Sara Bakri's national-team record of seven goals for Lebanon. She surpassed the record on 18 July 2023 – aged 17 years, 210 days – scoring a goal in a 5–0 win against Palestine. The record was broken two months later, on 30 September, when Lili Iskandar scored her ninth international goal.

She was called up to the 2024 WAFF Women's Championship, scoring two goals against Guam and Saudi Arabia. On 16 July 2025, Maalouf scored a hat-trick against Iran in a 3–1 win – Lebanon's first – in the 2026 Asian Cup qualifiers, bringing her tally to 17 goals and reclaiming her spot as Lebanon's all-time top scorer. It was also Lebanon's first ever hat-trick in an Asian Cup qualifier.

== Career statistics ==
=== International ===
Scores and results list Lebanon's goal tally first, score column indicates score after each Maalouf goal.

List of international goals scored by Christy Maalouf
No.	Date	Venue	Opponent	Score	Result	Competition
1	30 August 2021	Police Academy Stadium, Cairo, Egypt	Sudan	2–0	5–1	2021 Arab Cup
2	12 August 2022	Amin Abdelnour Stadium, Bhamdoun, Lebanon	Syria	1–0	1–1	Friendly
3	14 August 2022	Amin Abdelnour Stadium, Bhamdoun, Lebanon	Syria	1–0	2–1	Friendly
4	14 August 2022	Amin Abdelnour Stadium, Bhamdoun, Lebanon	Syria	2–0	2–1	Friendly
5	29 August 2022	Petra Stadium, Amman, Jordan	Palestine	2–0	3–0	2022 WAFF Championship
6	4 September 2022	Petra Stadium, Amman, Jordan	Syria	3–0	5–2	2022 WAFF Championship
7	8 April 2023	Fouad Chehab Stadium, Jounieh, Lebanon	Indonesia	4–0	5–0	2024 AFC Olympic Qualifying Tournament
8	18 July 2023	Ansar Stadium, Ansar, Lebanon	Palestine	5–0	5–0	Friendly
9	19 February 2024	King Abdullah Sports City Reserve Stadium, Jeddah, Saudi Arabia	Guam	2–2	4–3	2024 WAFF Championship
10	21 February 2024	King Abdullah Sports City Reserve Stadium, Jeddah, Saudi Arabia	Saudi Arabia	1–0	3–2	2024 WAFF Championship
11	23 February 2025	Dasharath Rangasala, Kathmandu, Nepal	Kyrgyzstan	1–0	2–0	2025 Vianet Championship
12	5 April 2025	Champville Stadium, Beirut, Lebanon	Comoros	1–0	1–1	Friendly
13	7 April 2025	Fouad Chehab Stadium, Jounieh, Lebanon	Comoros	3–0	4–0	Friendly
14	7 April 2025	Fouad Chehab Stadium, Jounieh, Lebanon	Comoros	4–0	4–0	Friendly
15	16 July 2025	King Abdullah II Stadium, Amman, Jordan	Iran	1–0	3–1	2026 Asian Cup qualification
16	16 July 2025	King Abdullah II Stadium, Amman, Jordan	Iran	2–0	3–1	2026 Asian Cup qualification
17	16 July 2025	King Abdullah II Stadium, Amman, Jordan	Iran	3–1	3–1	2026 Asian Cup qualification
18	13 October 2026	Fouad Chehab Stadium, Jounieh, Lebanon	Palestine	2–0	2–1	Friendly

== Honours ==
EFP

- Lebanese Women's FA Cup: 2020–21
- Lebanese Women's Super Cup runner-up: 2021–22

VGA Saint-Maur

- Régional 1 Féminine: 2024–25 (Île-de-France)
- Coupe de Paris: 2024–25, 2025–26
- Coupe du Val-de-Marne: 2024–25

Lebanon U15

- WAFF U-15 Girls Championship: 2019; runner-up: 2018

Lebanon U18

- WAFF U-18 Girls Championship: 2022

Lebanon

- WAFF Women's Championship runner-up: 2022

Individual

- WAFF U-15 Girls Championship top goalscorer: 2019

Records

- Lebanon all-time top goalscorer: 18 goals (as of 13 October 2026)

== See also ==
- List of top international women's football goalscorers by country
- List of Lebanon women's international footballers
