= Rawand Kassab =

Jordanian footballer

Personal information
- Full name: Rawand Hashem Abd-Alrazq Kassab
- Date of birth: 6 November 2003 (age 23)
- Place of birth: Amman, Jordan
- Position: Goalkeeper

Team information
- Current team: Al-Ahli
- Number: 1

Senior career*
Years	Team	Apps	(Gls)
2015–2022	Amman		
2022–2023	Al-Ahli (Amman)		
2023–	Al-Ahli (Jeddah)	7	(0)

International career^{‡}
2015–2017	Jordan U14	7	(0)
2016–2018	Jordan U17	4	(0)
2018–2020	Jordan U19	5	(0)
2021–	Jordan	10	(0)
Medal record
Women's football
Representing Jordan
Arab Women's Cup
Winner	2021 Egypt
WAFF Women's Championship
Winner	2022 Jordan
- * Club domestic league appearances and goals ‡ National team caps and goals as of 8 April 2025

Rawand Hashem Abd-Alrazq Kassab (Arabic: روند هاشم عبد الرزاق كساب; born 6 November 2003), is a Jordanian professional footballer who plays as a goalkeeper for Saudi Women's Premier League club Al-Ahli and the Jordan national team.

== Club career ==
Kassab started her football journey as a forward with the Zarka U-15 youth team. Later, the former national youth team coach, Manar Fraij, drafted her into the U-14 national team, shifting her position from attack to goalkeeper due to her limited effectiveness upfront. Kasab caught the attention of Amman's team after her standout performances, joining them in 2015 and representing the team across all age groups until 2022. Afterwards, she joined Al-Ahli SC where she played a pivotal role in Al-Ahli winning the league for the first time in history, Rawand was awarded the Best Goalkeeper trophy for the 2022 season.

In October 2023, Al-Ahli announced the signing of Kassab to compete in the 2023–24 season, This move reflects the club's commitment to strengthening its roster and enhancing its competitiveness in the upcoming season.

== International career ==
Kassab has earned caps with the women's under-14, under-17, and under-20 teams. with the under-14 team, she won the 2016 AFC U-14 Girls' Regional Championship West in Jordan. she played for the U-16 team since 2016 until 2018 playing two AFC U-16 Women's Championship qualifying tournaments in 2017 and 2019. she was called to the under-19 team for the 2019 AFC U-19 Women's Championship qualification in Hanoi. Yet, she remained on the bench for all three matches. the following year Kassab got called to participate in the 2019 WAFF U-18 Girls Championship in Bahrain. She helped the team clinch bronze in the tournament.

Kassab got her first call-up to the Jordanian team in 2021 to participate in the 2021 Arab Women's Cup. On 8 April 2022, Kassab made her international debut as starter in a 0–1 loss to India.

== Career statistics ==
=== International ===
As of 11 April 2023

Jordan
Year	Apps	Goals
2022	5	0
2023	2	0
Total	7	0

=== Club ===
As of match played 30 December 2023

Appearances and goals by club, season and competition
Club	Season	League			Cup		Continental		Other		Total	
Club	Season	Division	Apps	Goals	Apps	Goals	Apps	Goals	Apps	Goals	Apps	Goals
Al-Ahli	2023–24	SWPL	7	0	2	0	—		—		9	0
Al-Ahli	Total		7	0	2	0	—		—		9	0

== Honours ==
Amman SC

- Jordan Women's Pro League: 2020, 2021
- AFC Women's Club Championship: 2021

Al-Ahli SC (Amman)

- Jordan Women's Pro League: 2022

Al-Ahli (Jeddah)

- SAFF Women's Cup: 2023–24

Jordan

- Arab Women's Cup: 2021
- WAFF Women's Championship: 2022

Jordan U18

- WAFF U-18 Girls Championship Third place: 2019

Individual

- Jordan Women's Pro League Best Goalkeeper: 2022
- WAFF Women's Championship Best Goalkeeper: 2022
