= Waed Raed =

Lebanese footballer (born 2006)

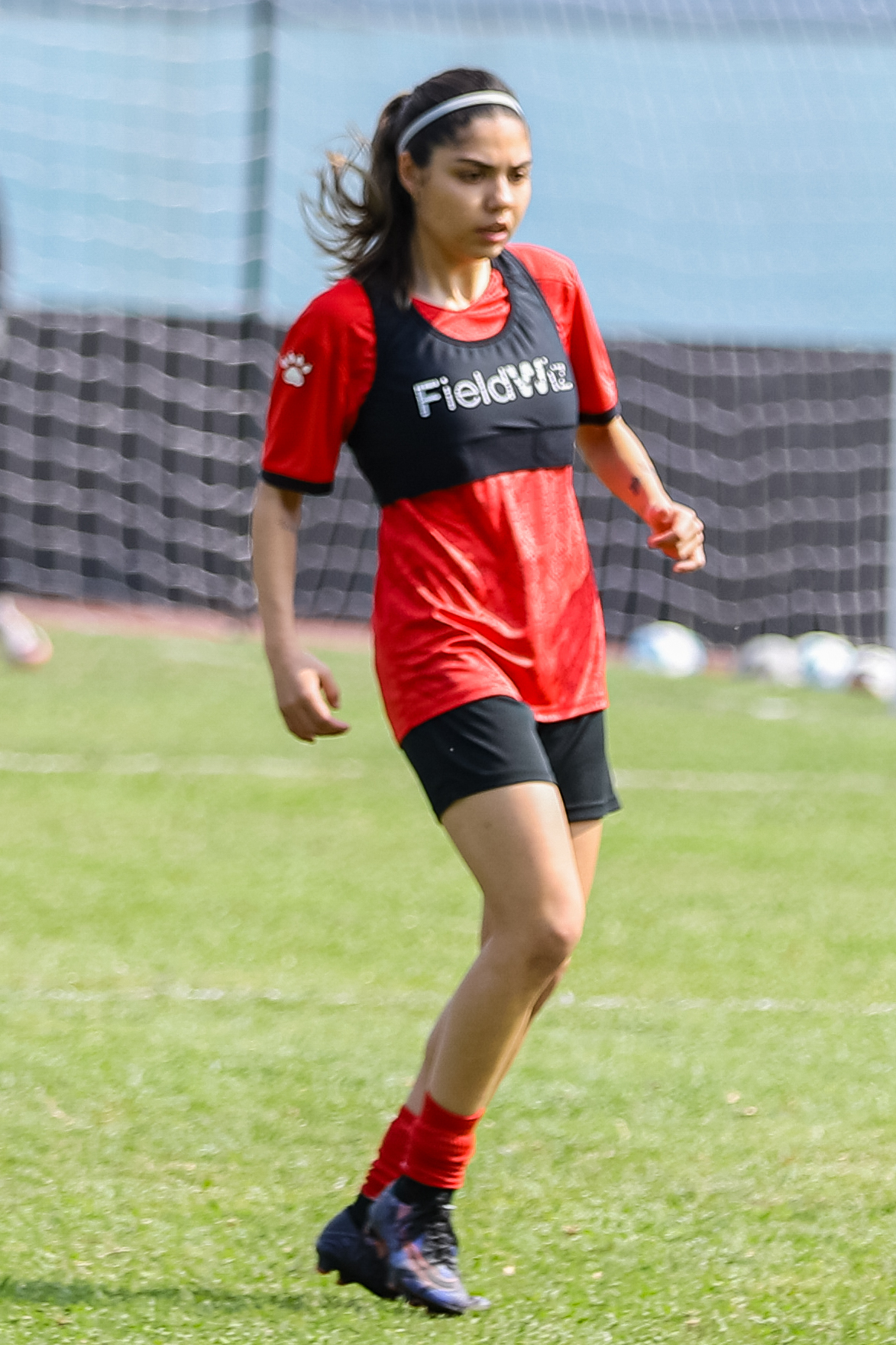
- Raed with Lebanon in 2025

Personal information
- Full name: Waed Bilal Raed
- Date of birth: 9 November 2006 (age 20)
- Place of birth: Ghobeiry, Lebanon
- Position: Left wing-back

Team information
- Current team: Jwaya
- Number: 24

Youth career
- Shady Football Academy
- SAS

Senior career*
| Years | Team | Apps | (Gls) |
| 2020–2024 | SAS | 43 | (10) |
| 2022 | → Safa (loan) | 0 | (0) |
| 2024–2025 | ÓBerytus | 10 | (5) |
| 2025– | Jwaya | 11 | (4) |

International career^{‡}
| 2019 | Lebanon U15 | | |
| 2022–2024 | Lebanon U18 | | (0) |
| 2024 | Lebanon U19 | 2 | (0) |
| 2023–2025 | Lebanon U20 | 7 | (1) |
| 2021– | Lebanon | 31 | (1) |
Medal record
Women's football
Representing Lebanon
WAFF Women's Championship
| Silver medal – second place | 2022 |
WAFF U-18 Girls Championship
| Gold medal – first place | 2022 | U-18 Team |
| Silver medal – second place | 2024 | U-18 Team |
WAFF U-15 Girls Championship
| Gold medal – first place | 2019 | U-15 Team |
- * Club domestic league appearances and goals as of 28 June 2026 ‡ National team caps and goals as of 13 October 2026

Waed Bilal Raed (Arabic: وعد بلال رعد; born 9 November 2006) is a Lebanese footballer who plays as a left wing-back for Lebanese club Jwaya and the Lebanon national team.

Coming through the youth system, Raed made her senior debut for SAS in 2020. She played for Safa during the 2022 WAFF Women's Clubs Championship, helping them lift the title. After one season at ÓBerytus in 2024–25, she joined Jwaya.

Raed played internationally for Lebanon at youth level, winning the 2019 WAFF U-15 Championship. She made her senior debut in 2021, and competed at the 2022 and 2024 WAFF Women's Championships.

== Club career ==
Raed began playing football in the Shady Football Academy in 2015 as the only girl in the academy, before moving to Stars Association for Sports (SAS)'s youth sector. She scored her first senior goal in the Lebanese Women's Football League on 13 June 2021, in a 3–3 draw against BFA. On 29 June 2022, Raed joined Safa on loan to compete in the 2022 WAFF Women's Clubs Championship in Jordan; Safa eventually won the tournament after beating Orthodox of Jordan 3–1 in the final.

On 31 August 2025, Raed joined ÓBerytus. On 12 October 2025, she joined Jwaya.

== International career ==
Raed played for the Lebanon national under-15 team at the 2019 WAFF U-15 Championship, winning the tournament.

She made her senior international debut for Lebanon on 30 August 2021, as a half-time substitute in a 5–1 win against Sudan in the 2021 Arab Women's Cup. Raed was called up to represent Lebanon at the 2022 WAFF Women's Championship, helping her side finish runners-up.

On 18 September 2023, she scored her first international goal against Laos in a friendly tournament in Saudi Arabia. She was called up to the 2024 WAFF Women's Championship.

== Personal life ==
Raed supports Spanish club Barcelona and Lebanese club Ansar.

== Career statistics ==
=== International ===
Scores and results list Lebanon's goal tally first, score column indicates score after each Raed goal.

List of international goals scored by Waed Raed
| No. | Date | Venue | Opponent | Score | Result | Competition |
|---|---|---|---|---|---|---|
| 1 | 18 September 2023 | King Fahd Sports City, Taif, Saudi Arabia | Laos | 3–0 | 4–1 | 2023 SAFF Friendly Tournament |

== Honours ==
Safa

- WAFF Women's Clubs Championship: 2022

SAS

- Lebanese Women's Football League: 2021–22, 2022–23

Lebanon U15

- WAFF U-15 Girls Championship: 2019

Lebanon U18

- WAFF U-18 Girls Championship: 2022; runner-up: 2024

Lebanon

- WAFF Women's Championship runner-up: 2022

== See also ==
- List of Lebanon women's international footballers
