= Pilar Khoury =

Association football player (born 1994)

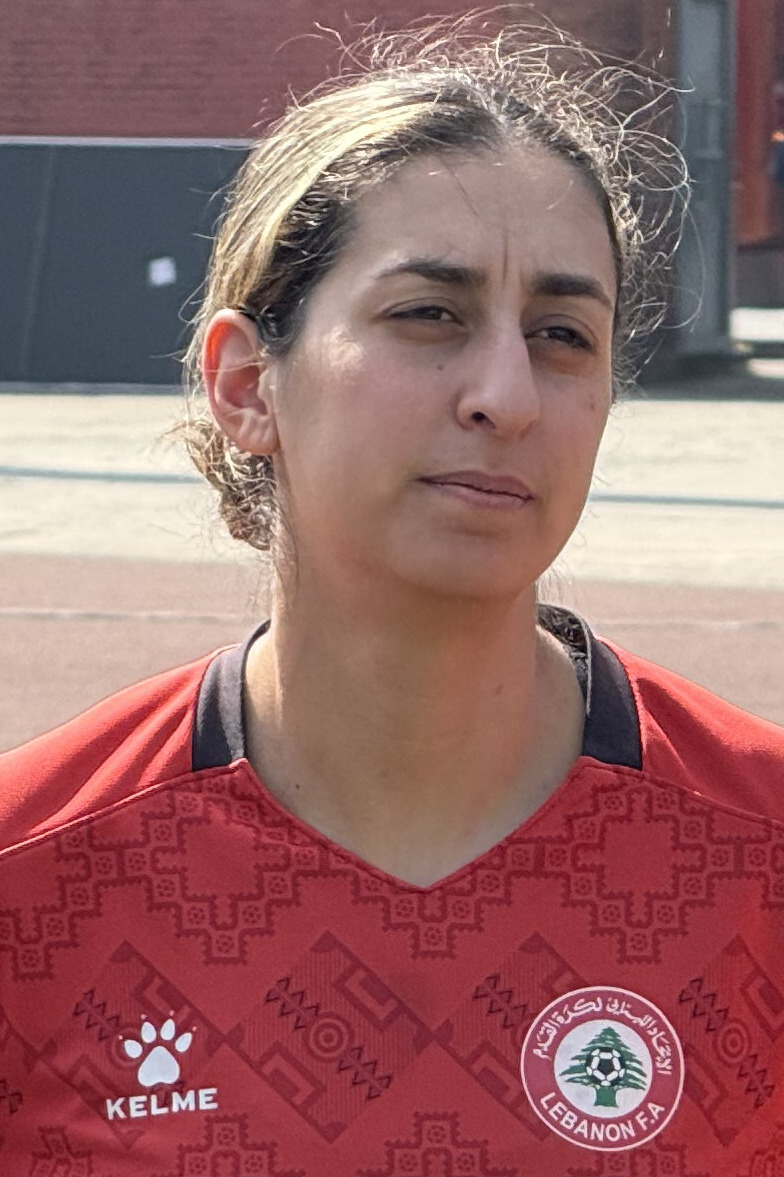
- Khoury with Lebanon in 2025

Personal information
- Full name: Pilar Tony Khoury
- Date of birth: 25 August 1994 (age 32)
- Place of birth: Ottawa, Ontario, Canada
- Height: 1.64 m (5 ft 5 in)
- Position: Forward

Team information
- Current team: Metz U19 (head coach)

Youth career
- 2004–2011: Ottawa Gloucester Hornets

College career
Years	Team	Apps	(Gls)
2011–2016	Ottawa Gee-Gees		(58)

Senior career*
Years	Team	Apps	(Gls)
2016–2018	Albi	31	(3)
2018–2019	Grenoble	22	(11)
2019–2021	Saint-Étienne	17	(10)
2021–2023	Nantes	38	(11)
2023–2025	Strasbourg	30	(4)
Total		138	(39)

International career
2021–2025	Lebanon	14	(5)

Managerial career
- 2025–: Metz U19
Medal record
Women's football
Representing Lebanon
WAFF Women's Championship
Silver medal – second place	2022
- * Club domestic league appearances and goals

Pilar Tony Khoury (Arabic: بيلار توني خوري; born 25 August 1994) is a professional football coach and former player who is the head coach of French club Metz's under-19 team. Born in Canada, Khoury played for the Lebanon national team.

A forward, Khoury played at the college level for the Ottawa Gee-Gees, the University of Ottawa's team; she left in 2016 as their all-time goal scorer with 58 goals. Khoury moved to France the same year, where she joined Albi in the Division 1 Féminine; she then played for Division 2 sides Grenoble, Saint-Étienne, Nantes and Strasbourg. Khoury helped the latter team gain promotion to the Première Ligue in 2024.

Khoury played for the Lebanon national team between 2021 and 2025. She helped Lebanon finish runners-up at the 2022 WAFF Championship, in which she scored her first international goal.

== Early life ==
Khoury was born in Canada to Lebanese parents. She noted that she was surrounded by Lebanese people and culture growing up, due to the large presence of Lebanese diaspora in her area.

== Club career ==
=== Youth and college ===
At 10 years old, Khoury began her youth career at local club Ottawa Gloucester Hornets, where she remained for seven years. She began as a defender, before being moved up to forward in her last year at the club.

In 2011, Khoury moved to the University of Ottawa's team, the Ottawa Gee-Gees. She made her breakthrough in her third season at the club, in 2013–14, breaking the university's scoring record twice and winning multiple individual titles. Khoury finished her career with the Gee-Gees in 2015 as their all-time leading goal scorer, with 58 goals. (Note: The record has been surpassed by Cassandra Provost, who scored her 59th goal on 5 October 2024.)

=== Albi ===
Khoury began her senior career in 2016, moving to Division 1 Féminine side Albi in France on 1 August. After being a reserve for the first half of the 2016–17 season, she became a regular in the second half and helped her side avoid relegation. Her second season saw Khoury miss multiple matches due to injuries, and the club was relegated to the Division 2.

=== Grenoble ===
She moved to Grenoble for the 2018–19 season in the Division 2. After a slow start, scoring once in the first half of the season, Khoury scored 10 goals in her next 10 games. She also scored three goals in four Coupe de France games.

=== Saint-Étienne ===
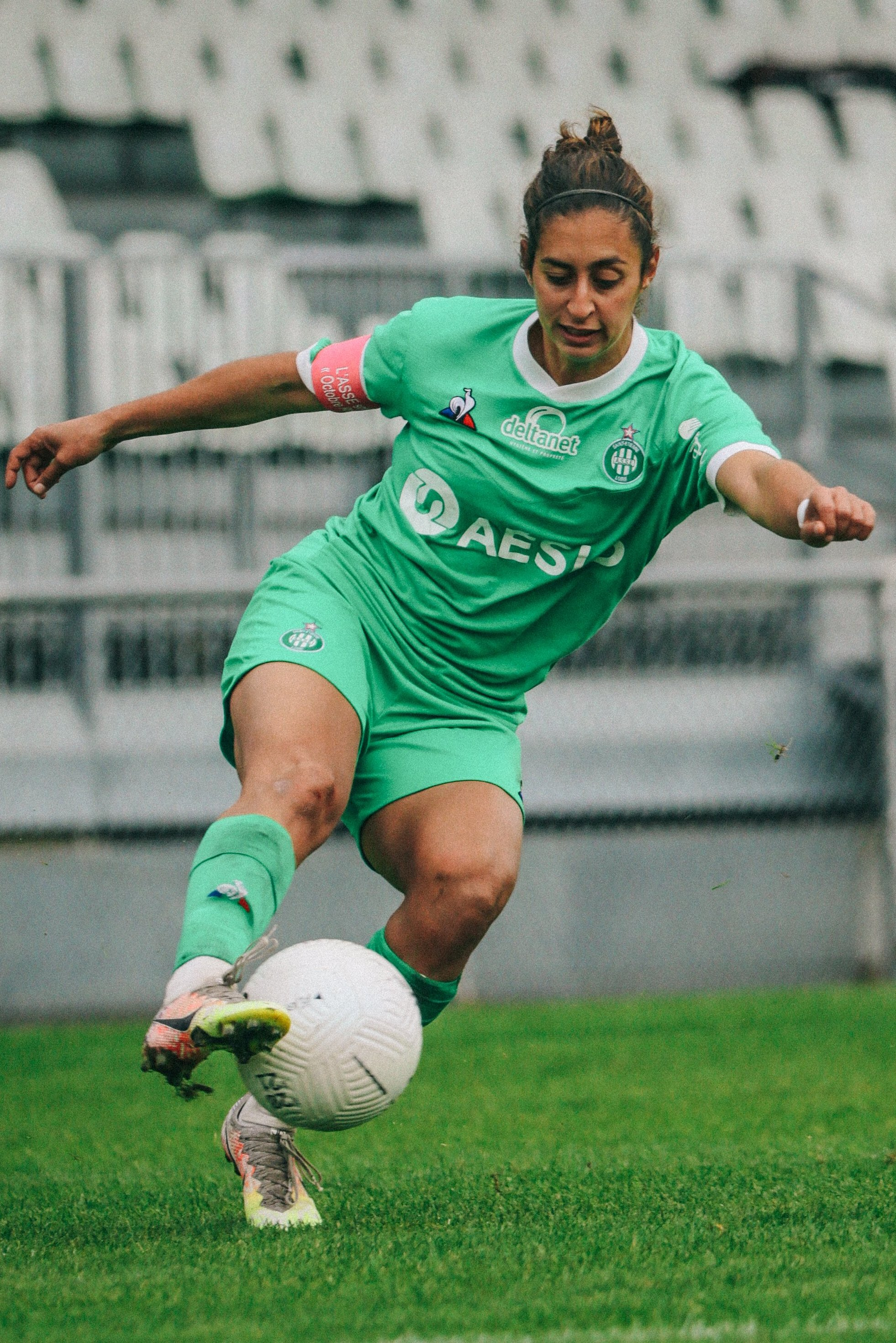
Khoury playing for Saint-Étienne in 2020

In 2019, Khoury joined Division 2 runners-up Saint-Étienne where, in the 2019–20 season, she scored six league goals in 11 matches. She also scored a goal in her only Coupe de France appearance.

In 2020–21, Khoury scored four goals in four games, before the season was cancelled due to the COVID-19 pandemic in France. She finished with 11 goals in 18 games in all competitions.

=== Nantes ===
On 27 July 2021, Khoury moved to Nantes. She made her debut on 5 September, in a 3–0 win against Lens. On 10 October, Khoury scored her first goal for Nantes, helping her team win 3–0 against Orléans. She ended the 2021–22 season with six goals in 20 league games, missing out on Division 1 promotion by one point. Khoury also scored one goal in five Coupe de France games, helping her side reach the semi-finals.

The following season, in 2022–23, Khoury scored five goals in 18 league games, as well as two goals in three Coupe de France games. Nantes finished in third place.

=== Strasbourg ===
On 28 July 2023, fellow Division 2 team Strasbourg announced the signing of Khoury. She scored four goals in 19 games in the 2023–24 league season, helping her team win the championship and gain promotion to the Première Ligue.

On 12 January 2025, Khoury scored a brace in a 4–0 win in the Coupe de France against VGA Saint-Maur. She helped her side avoid relegation in the last matchday, finishing in ninth place in the 2024–25 Première Ligue.

== International career ==
Born in Canada, Khoury is of Lebanese descent. In 2020 she stated her preference to play for Lebanon over Canada, saying that she dreamed of representing Lebanon from a young age.

Khoury was first called up for Lebanon in April 2021, ahead of a friendly tournament in Armenia. Regarding her first call-up, she stated: "I have difficulty expressing how much it means to me. To represent my parents' country after all the sacrifices they made for my soccer career". However, due to resulting positive to COVID-19, she was unable to travel.

She made her debut on 21 October 2021, helping Lebanon beat the United Arab Emirates 1–0 in the 2022 AFC Asian Cup qualification. Khoury was called up to represent Lebanon at the 2022 WAFF Championship; she helped her side finish runners-up, scoring her first international goal against Syria on 4 September 2022.

== Managerial career ==
Khoury worked with youth teams ranging from under-11 to under-19 at Saint-Étienne, Nantes, and Strasbourg. On 2 September 2025, she was appointed video analyst for Seconde Ligue club Metz and head coach of the club's under-19 team.

== Style of play ==
Initially a striker, Khoury developed into a winger during her stay at Nantes. She was capable of playing in all attacking positions.

== Personal life ==
Khoury's maternal grandfather, Louis Saad, was also a footballer; he died in 2013. Khoury stated that he taught her how to play football. A few days prior to dying, her grandfather passed his French citizenship onto her, which facilitated her move to play professionally in France three years later. She is the cousin of fellow footballer Ralph Khoury.

While playing for the Ottawa Gee-Gees, Khoury completed a bachelor's degree in health sciences with a minor in psychology. Khoury was also a student during her time at Albi.

== Career statistics ==
=== Club ===
Appearances and goals by club, season and competition
Club	Season	League			Coupe de France		Total	
Club	Season	Division	Apps	Goals	Apps	Goals	Apps	Goals
Albi	2016–17	Division 1	15	2	1	0	16	2
Albi	2017–18	Division 1	16	1	1	1	17	2
Albi	Total		31	3	2	1	33	4
Grenoble	2018–19	Division 2	22	11	4	2	26	13
Saint-Étienne	2019–20	Division 2	13	6	1	1	14	7
Saint-Étienne	2020–21	Division 2	4	4	0	0	4	4
Saint-Étienne	Total		17	10	1	1	18	11
Nantes	2021–22	Division 2	20	6	5	1	25	7
Nantes	2022–23	Division 2	18	5	3	2	21	7
Nantes	Total		38	11	8	3	46	14
Strasbourg	2023–24	Division 2	19	4	2	0	21	4
Strasbourg	2024–25	Première Ligue	11	0	2	2	13	2
Strasbourg	Total		30	4	4	2	34	8
Career total			138	39	19	9	157	48

=== International ===
Appearances and goals by national team and year
National team	Year	Apps	Goals
Lebanon	2021	1	0
Lebanon	2022	2	1
Lebanon	2023	5	2
Lebanon	2024	0	0
Lebanon	2025	6	2
Total		14	5

Scores and results list Lebanon's goal tally first, score column indicates score after each Khoury goal.

List of international goals scored by Pilar Khoury
No.	Date	Venue	Opponent	Score	Result	Competition
1	4 September 2022	Petra Stadium, Amman, Jordan	Syria	5–0	5–2	2022 WAFF Championship
2	5 April 2023	Fouad Chehab Stadium, Jounieh, Lebanon	Chinese Taipei	1–0	1–5	2024 AFC Olympic Qualifying Tournament
3	8 April 2023	Fouad Chehab Stadium, Jounieh, Lebanon	Indonesia	2–0	5–0	2024 AFC Olympic Qualifying Tournament
4	7 April 2025	Fouad Chehab Stadium, Jounieh Lebanon	Comoros	2–0	4–0	Friendly
5	10 July 2025	King Abdullah II Stadium, Amman, Jordan	Bhutan	1–1	1–2	2026 Asian Cup qualification

== Honours ==
Strasbourg

- Division 2 Féminine: 2023–24

Lebanon

- WAFF Women's Championship runner-up: 2022

Individual

- OUA Player of the Year: 2014–15, 2015–16
- OUA First Team All-Star: 2013–14, 2014–15, 2015–16
- U SPORTS First Team All-Canadian: 2014–15, 2015–16

== See also ==
- List of Lebanon women's international footballers
- List of association football families
