= Farah El Tayar =

Lebanese footballer (born 2003)

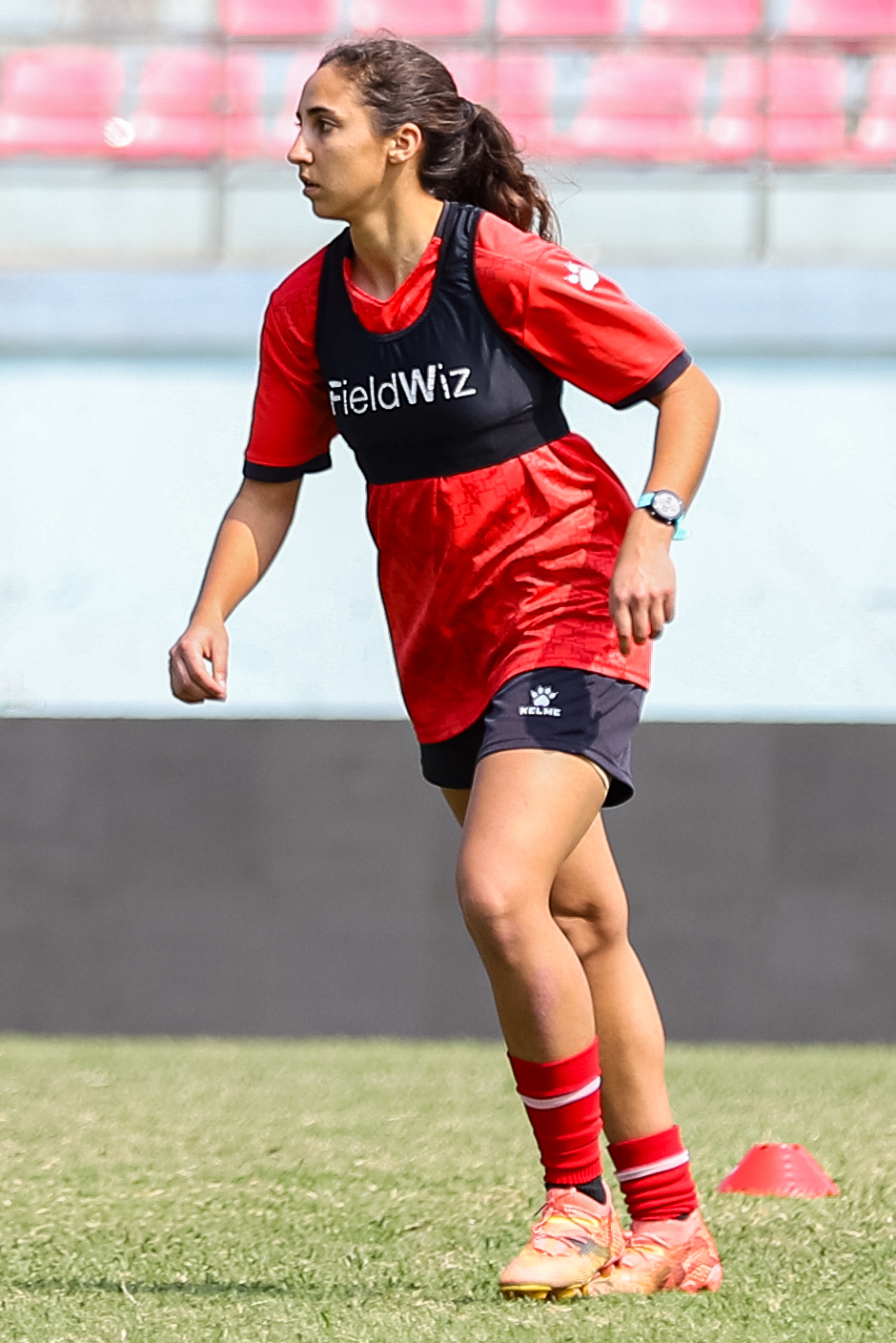
- El Tayar training with Lebanon in 2025

Personal information
- Full name: Farah Dani El Tayar
- Date of birth: 10 December 2003 (age 22)
- Place of birth: Bsous, Lebanon
- Height: 1.63 m (5 ft 4 in)
- Position: Full-back

College career
Years	Team	Apps	(Gls)
2021–2024	FIU Panthers	51	(1)

Senior career*
Years	Team	Apps	(Gls)
2018–2020	Akhaa Ahli Aley		(4)
2020–2021	EFP	11	(5)
2022	Iowa Raptors FC		(0)
2024	Tormenta FC	4	(0)
Total			(9)

International career
2018	Lebanon U15		(2)
2018	Lebanon U16	4	(1)
2019	Lebanon U19	3	(1)
2021–2025	Lebanon	9	(1)
Medal record
Women's football
Representing Lebanon
WAFF U-18 Girls Championship
Gold medal – first place	2019	U-18 Team
WAFF U-15 Girls Championship
Silver medal – second place	2018	U-15 Team
- * Club domestic league appearances and goals

Farah Dani El Tayar (Arabic: فرح داني الطيار; born 10 December 2003) is a Lebanese former footballer who played as a full-back.

== Club career ==
El Tayar began her club career in Lebanon, playing for Akhaa Ahli Aley from 2018 to 2020 and then Eleven Football Pro from 2020 to 2021, both in the Lebanese Women's Football League.

On 3 August 2021, El Tayar was recruited to play for Florida International University in the United States. She made her debut on 22 August, as a 19th-minute substitute in a 3–2 defeat to the Jacksonville Dolphins. In 2023, during her senior season, she captained the team.

On 18 April 2022, El Tayar joined the Iowa Raptors FC in the Women's Premier Soccer League.

On 4 April 2024, El Tayar signed with Tormenta FC in the USL W League.

== International career ==
El Tayar represented Lebanon at various youth levels, playing for the U15 and U16 teams in 2018, and being called up to the U19 squad the following year.

She made her senior international debut on 8 April 2021, coming on as a substitute in the 2021 Armenia International Friendly Tournament against hosts Armenia. She scored her first goal two days later, in a 7–1 defeat against Lithuania in the same competition. In 2024, she played in the AFC Olympics Qualifiers. In 2025, she recorded 3 appearances and an assist in the ANFA International Championship, and also appeared in two friendly matches.

== Career statistics ==
=== International ===
Scores and results list Lebanon's goal tally first, score column indicates score after each El Tayar goal.

List of international goals scored by Farah El Tayar
No.	Date	Venue	Opponent	Score	Result	Competition
1	10 April 2021	Pyunik Training Centre, Yerevan, Armenia	Lithuania	1–4	1–7	2021 Armenia Tournament

== Honours ==
Lebanon U15

- WAFF U-15 Girls Championship: runner-up: 2018

Lebanon U18

- WAFF U-18 Girls Championship: 2019

== See also ==
- List of Lebanon women's international footballers
