= Katerina Falida =

Greek footballer

Personal information
- Full name: Aikaterini Falida
- Date of birth: 2 April 1983
- Place of birth: Greece
- Position: Goalkeeper

Senior career*
Years	Team	Apps	(Gls)
- Kallithea

International career
- Greece

Managerial career
- 2009–2014: Olympiacos (academy coach)
- 2011–2013: Lavra Argyroupolis
- 2014–2018: Olympiacos (U19 & U17 assistant)
- 2018–2019: AEK (academy coach)
- 2019–2022: Greece U17
- 2019–2022: Greece U19
- 2019–2022: Greece (assistant)
- 2022–2023: Singapore U17
- 2023–2025: Al Qadsiah (technical director)
- 2025–: Saudi Arabia U17
- * Club domestic league appearances and goals

Aikaterini "Katerina" Falida (Greek: Κατερίνα Φαλίδα; born 2 April 1983) is a Greek football manager and former footballer.

== Early life and education ==
Falida started playing football at the age of six. Falida attended the National and Kapodistrian University of Athens in Greece.

== Managerial career ==
Falida managed the Greece women's national under-17 football team, helping the team reach the elite round of 2020 UEFA Women's Under-17 Championship qualification.

== Personal life ==
Falida is fluent in English.
