= Yasmin Nayroukh =

Palestinian football referee

Yasmin Nayroukh (Arabic: ياسمين نيروخ) is a Palestinian football referee.
