= Lebanese Women's Super Cup =

Lebanese women's annual football match

- Founded: 2016
- Region: Lebanon
- Teams: 2
- Current champions: Safa (1st title)
- Most championships: Zouk Mosbeh (2 titles)
- 2021–22 Lebanese Women's Super Cup

The Lebanese Women's Super Cup (Arabic: كأس السوبر اللبناني للسيدات) is an annual match contested between the champions of the previous Lebanese Women's Football League season and the holders of the Lebanese Women's Cup – designed as an equivalent to the Lebanese Super Cup. The competition began in 2015, with FC Beirut winning the first title.

== List of finals ==
| Year | Winners | Score | Runners up |
|---|---|---|---|
| 2015–16 | FC Beirut | 5–2 | SAS |
| 2016–17 | SAS | 15–0 | FC Beirut |
| 2017–18 | Zouk Mosbeh | 5–2 | SAS |
| 2018–19 | Zouk Mosbeh | 5–0 | SAS |
| 2019–20 | Not held | | |
| 2020–21 | Not held | | |
| 2021–22 | Safa | 2–1 | EFP |
| 2022–23 | Not held | | |

=== Performance by club ===
| Club | Winners | Runners-up | Winning years |
|---|---|---|---|
| Zouk Mosbeh | 2 | 0 | 2017–18, 2018–19 |
| SAS | 1 | 3 | 2016–17 |
| FC Beirut | 1 | 1 | 2015–16 |
| Safa | 1 | 0 | 2021–22 |
| EFP | 0 | 1 | |

== See also ==
- Women's football in Lebanon
- Lebanese Women's Cup
- Lebanese Super Cup
