= 2019 WAFF U-18 Girls Championship =

Women's national youth association football tournament

Tournament details
- Host country: Bahrain
- City: Isa Town
- Dates: 29 December 2019 – 6 January 2020
- Teams: 7 (from 1 sub-confederation)
- Venue(s): 1 (in 1 host city)

Final positions
- Champions: Lebanon (1st title)
- Runners-up: Bahrain
- Third place: Jordan
- Fourth place: Palestine

Tournament statistics
- Matches played: 14
- Goals scored: 50 (3.57 per match)
- Top scorer(s): (Lebanon) Lili Iskandar (7 goals)
- Best player(s): (Palestine) Emily Ibrahim
- Best goalkeeper: (Bahrain) Zahra Ali

The 2019 WAFF U-18 Girls Championship was the 2nd edition of the WAFF U-18 Girls Championship, the international women's football youth championship of Western Asia organised by the West Asian Football Federation (WAFF). It was held in Bahrain from 29 December 2019 to 6 January 2020. Lebanon won their first title, after beating hosts Bahrain 3–0 in the final.

== Teams ==
Seven teams competed in the tournament.

Country	Appearance	Previous best performance
Bahrain	1st	—
Iraq	1st	—
Jordan	2nd	Champions (2018)
Kuwait	1st	—
Lebanon	2nd	Runners-up (2018)
Palestine	2nd	Third place (2018)
United Arab Emirates	1st	—

== Group stage ==
All times are local, AST (UTC+3).

=== Group A ===
Pos	Team	Pld	W	D	L	GF	GA	GD	Pts	Qualification
1	Lebanon	3	3	0	0	10	1	+9	9	Advance to knockout stage
2	Jordan	3	1	1	1	4	3	+1	4	Advance to knockout stage
3	United Arab Emirates	3	1	1	1	5	5	0	4	Advance to 5th place play-off
4	Iraq	3	0	0	3	2	12	−10	0	

Source: WAFF
29 December 2019
16:30

Iraq	2–4	United Arab Emirates
Muayad 65', 73'	Report	Alzarkan 24', 63'; Rashid 61'; Aljasimi 78'

Khalifa Sports City Stadium, Isa Town
29 December 2019
17:30

Lebanon	3–0	Jordan
Al Tayar 4', 25'; Kassap 73' (o.g.)	Report

Khalifa Sports City Stadium, Isa Town

31 December 2019
17:30

Jordan	4–0	Iraq
Almaiah 17' (pen.); Alluhaymaq 52', 59'; Albtoosh 62' (pen.)	Report

Khalifa Sports City Stadium, Isa Town
31 December 2019
20:30

United Arab Emirates	1–3	Lebanon
Alzarkan 71'	Report	Iskandar 14', 76'; El Tayar 42'

Khalifa Sports City Stadium, Isa Town

2 January 2020
14:30

United Arab Emirates	0–0	Jordan
	Report

Khalifa Sports City Stadium, Isa Town
2 January 2020
20:30

Lebanon	4–0	Iraq
Assaf 32'; Salha 75'; Nassif 76'; Abi Faraj 81'	Report

Khalifa Sports City Stadium, Isa Town

=== Group B ===
Pos	Team	Pld	W	D	L	GF	GA	GD	Pts	Qualification
1	Bahrain (H)	2	2	0	0	6	1	+5	6	Advance to knockout stage
2	Palestine	2	1	0	1	7	2	+5	3	Advance to knockout stage
3	Kuwait	2	0	0	2	1	11	−10	0	Advance to 5th place play-off

Source: WAFF
(H) Hosts
29 December 2019
20:30

Kuwait	1–4	Bahrain
Alraqem 86'	Report	Sabkar 11', 81'; Almannaei 45+1', 75'

Khalifa Sports City Stadium, Isa Town

31 December 2019
14:30

Palestine	7–0	Kuwait
Salama 9'; Sarawi 39', 55'; Nasrah 45+1'; Bawatneh 47'; Alhouti 66' (o.g.); Aldhafiri 90+2' (o.g.)	Report

Khalifa Sports City Stadium, Isa Town

2 January 2020
17:30

Bahrain	2–0	Palestine
Shattara 82' (o.g.); Almannaei 89'	Report

Khalifa Sports City Stadium, Isa Town

== 5th place play-off ==
5 January 2020
17:30 (UTC+3)

United Arab Emirates	2–0	Kuwait
Alhammadi 42'; Alzarkan 59'	Report

Khalifa Sports City Stadium, Isa Town

== Knockout stage ==
All times are local, AST (UTC+3).

=== Bracket ===
Semi-finals
4 January – Khalifa Sports City
Lebanon	4
Palestine	2
4 January – Khalifa Sports City
Bahrain (p)	0 (5)
Jordan	0 (3)

Final
6 January – Khalifa Sports City
Lebanon	3
Bahrain	0
Third place
6 January – Khalifa Sports City
Palestine	1
Jordan	3

=== Semi-finals ===
4 January 2020
17:00

Lebanon	4–2	Palestine
Iskandar 28', 42', 45'; El Tayar 90+2' (pen.)	Report	Bawatneh 67'; Shattara 75'

Khalifa Sports City Stadium, Isa Town
4 January 2020
20:30

Bahrain	0–0 (a.e.t.)	Jordan
	Report
Penalties
	5–3

Khalifa Sports City Stadium, Isa Town

=== Third place play-off ===
6 January 2020
17:30

Palestine	1–3	Jordan
Alshakhshir 72'	Report	Abusa'ad 45'; Al Barghouthy 54', 75'

Khalifa Sports City Stadium, Isa Town

=== Final ===
6 January 2020
20:30

Lebanon	3–0	Bahrain
Iskandar 45+1', 87'; El Tayar 53'	Report

Khalifa Sports City Stadium, Isa Town

== Statistics ==
=== Final ranking ===
As per statistical convention in football, matches decided in extra time are counted as wins and losses, while matches decided by penalty shoot-outs are counted as draws.

Pos	Team	Pld	W	D	L	GF	GA	GD	Pts	Final result
1	Lebanon	5	5	0	0	17	3	+14	15	Champions
2	Bahrain	4	2	1	1	6	4	+2	7	Runners-up
3	Jordan	5	2	2	1	7	4	+3	8	Third place
4	Palestine	4	1	0	3	10	9	+1	3	Fourth place
5	United Arab Emirates	4	2	1	1	7	5	+2	7	Fifth place
6	Kuwait	3	0	0	3	1	13	−12	0	Sixth place
7	Iraq	3	0	0	3	2	12	−10	0	Eliminated in Group stage

Source: WAFF

=== Goalscorers ===
There were 50 goals scored in 14 matches, for an average of 3.57 goals per match.

7 goals

- (Lebanon) Lili Iskandar

5 goals

- (Lebanon) Farah El Tayar

4 goals

- (United Arab Emirates) Shahd Alzarkan

3 goals

- (Bahrain) Alannoud Almannaei

2 goals

- (Bahrain) Leleya Sabkar
- (Iraq) Tbarek Muayad
- (Jordan) Tala Al Barghouthy
- (Jordan) Sima Alluhaymaq
- (Palestine) Dana Bawatneh
- (Palestine) Hala Sarawi

1 goal

- (Jordan) Leen Abusa'ad
- (Jordan) Lujain Albtoosh
- (Jordan) Lina Almaiah
- (Kuwait) Muneerah Alraqem
- (Lebanon) Zeina Abi Faraj
- (Lebanon) Zahraa Assaf
- (Lebanon) Rachelle Nassif
- (Lebanon) Syntia Salha
- (Palestine) Sara Alshakhshir
- (Palestine) Camellia Nasrah
- (Palestine) Tina Salama
- (Palestine) Jeniver Shattara
- (United Arab Emirates) Rawan Alhammadi
- (United Arab Emirates) Najla Aljasimi
- (United Arab Emirates) Ghanima Rashid

1 own goal

- (Jordan) Rawned Kassap (against Lebanon)
- (Kuwait) Sarah Aldhafiri (against Palestine)
- (Kuwait) Nour Alhouti (against Palestine)
- (Palestine) Jeniver Shattara (against Bahrain)

Source: WAFF
