= Jordan women's national under-17 football team =

National association football team

Jordan U-17
- Nickname(s): نشميات الأردن; Nashmeyat Al-Urdon ("The Chivalrous of Jordan")
- Association: Jordan Football Association
- Confederation: AFC (Asia)
- Sub-confederation: WAFF (West Asia)
- Head coach: Jamal Al-Lahham
First colours	Second colours	Third colours

First international
- Jordan 3–0 India (Amman, Jordan; 10 October 2010)

Biggest win
- Syria 0–15 Jordan (Dubai, United Arab Emirates; 7 April 2018)

Biggest defeat
- Jordan 0–9 China (Colombo, Sri Lanka; 21 September 2018)

World Cup
- Appearances: 1 (first in 2016)
- Best result: Group Stage, 2016

Asian Cup
- Appearances: 1 (first in 2013)
- Best result: Group Stage, 2013

WAFF U-17 Girls Championship
- Appearances: 6 (first in 2018)
- Best result: Champions (2018)
Medal record
WAFF U-17 Girls Championship
Gold medal – first place	2018 United Arab Emirates
Silver medal – second place	2019 Jordan
Silver medal – second place	2023 Jordan
Silver medal – second place	2023 Jordan
Bronze medal – third place	2025 Saudi Arabia

Jordan women's national under-17 football team represents Jordan in international youth football competitions.

Jordan had played the FIFA U-17 Women's World Cup as hosts in 2016. They also had played the AFC U-17 Asian Cup once back in 2013 where they bowed out of group stage.

== Results and friendlies ==
=== 2026 ===
18 July 2026 2026 WAFF U-17 GS	Palestine	0–5	Jordan	Zarqa, Jordan
18:00 UTC+3		Report; Report (WAFF)	Ja'ara 17', 84'; Abu Salha 28'; Haqrous 74', 77'	Stadium: Prince Mohammed Stadium

22 July 2026 2026 WAFF U-17 GS	Jordan	2–0	Bahrain	Zarqa, Jordan
18:00 UTC+3	Abu Salha 54' (pen.); Obeidat 86'	Report		Stadium: Prince Mohammed Stadium

24 July 2026 2026 WAFF U-17 SF	Jordan	0–5	Lebanon	Zarqa, Jordan
20:00 UTC+3		Report	Geitani 29', 56'; C. Chebly 31'; D. Hajj 60'; Saad 79'	Stadium: Prince Mohammed Stadium

15 August 2026 Srikandi Merdeka Cup 2026 GS	Singapore	1–3	Jordan	Kudus, Indonesia
15:00 UTC+7		Report		Stadium: Supersoccer Arena

17 August 2026 Srikandi Merdeka Cup 2026 GS	Jordan	0–2	Thailand	Kudus, Indonesia
16:00 UTC+7		Report		Stadium: Supersoccer Arena

19 August 2026 Srikandi Merdeka Cup 2026 GS	Jordan	1–3	PUTRI NUSANTARA	Kudus, Indonesia
15:00 UTC+7		Report		Stadium: Supersoccer Arena

21 August 2026 Srikandi Merdeka Cup 2026 SF	Indonesia	3–0	Jordan	Kudus, Indonesia
15:00 UTC+7		Report		Stadium: Supersoccer Arena

23 August 2026 Srikandi Merdeka Cup 2026 3rd place	Malaysia	4–0	Jordan	Kudus, Indonesia
--:-- UTC+7		Report		Stadium: Supersoccer Arena

10 September 2026 Friendly	Bangladesh	5–0	Jordan	JFA Field, Jordan
17:00 UTC+3	Alpi 10'; Reya 51'; Mousumi 58'; Kulsum 80'; Payal 90'	Report

13 September 2026 Friendly	Bangladesh	2–0	Jordan	JFA Field, Jordan
17:00 UTC+3	Alpi	Report

5 October 2026 2027 Asian Cup qualification	Jordan	1–1	Tajikistan	Tursonzoda, Tajikistan
20:00 UTC+5	Dweik 69'	Report	Abdikarimova 80'	Stadium: TALCO Arena; Referee: Keomany Phengmeuangkhoun (Laos)

8 October 2026 2027 Asian Cup qualification	United Arab Emirates	0–6	Jordan	Tursonzoda, Tajikistan
15:00 UTC+5		Report	Haqrous 21', 35'; Dweik 47', 80', 87'; Abu-Helweh 13'	Stadium: TALCO Arena; Referee: Ranjita Devi Tekcham (India)

11 October 2026 2027 Asian Cup qualification	South Korea	9–0	Jordan	Tursonzoda, Tajikistan
15:00 UTC+5	Shin So-eun 11', 40'; Lim Ji-hye 22'; Cho An 28', 57', 80'; Choi Min-seo 60'; Park Na-young 67'; Kwon Hyo-ri 77'	Report		Stadium: TALCO Arena; Referee: Wang Yuran (China)

== Competitive record ==
=== FIFA U-17 Women's World Cup ===
Year	Round	Pld	W	D	L	GF	GA	Squad
(New Zealand) 2008	Did not qualify							
(Trinidad and Tobago) 2010	Did not qualify							
(Azerbaijan) 2012	Did not qualify							
(Costa Rica) 2014	Did not qualify							
(Jordan) 2016	Group stage	3	0	0	3	1	15	Squad
(Uruguay) 2018	Did not qualify							
(India) 2022	Did not qualify							
(Dominican Republic) 2024	Did not qualify							
(Morocco) 2025	Did not qualify							
Total	1/9	3	0	0	3	1	15	-

=== AFC U-17 Women's Asian Cup ===
AFC U-17 Women's Asian Cup record								Qualification record					
Year	Round	Pld	W	D	L	GF	GA	Pld	W	D	L	GF	GA
(South Korea) 2005	Did not qualify							Not held					
(Malaysia) 2007	Did not qualify							Not held					
(Thailand) 2009	Did not qualify							Did not enter					
(China) 2011	Did not qualify							2	1	1	0	4	1
(China) 2013	Group stage	2	0	0	2	1	8	2	2	0	0	13	0
(China) 2015	Did not qualify							4	1	0	3	12	14
(Thailand) 2017	Did not qualify							4	1	0	3	7	9
(Thailand) 2019	Did not qualify							4	2	1	1	16	9
(Indonesia) 2024	Did not qualify							2	0	0	2	2	11
(China) 2026	Did not qualify							2	0	1	1	2	7
Total	1/10	2	0	0	2	1	8	20	7	3	10	56	51

=== WAFF U-17 Girls Championship ===
Host nation(s) and year	Round	Pos	Pld	W	D	L	GF	GA
(United Arab Emirates) 2018	Champions	1st	4	3	1	0	25	2
(Jordan) 2019	Runners-up	2nd	3	1	1	1	5	2
(Jordan) 2023	Runners-up	2nd	4	1	2	1	2	3
(Jordan) 2023	Runners-up	2nd	4	2	1	1	8	2
(Saudi Arabia) 2025	Third place	3rd	4	3	1	0	10	0
(Jordan) 2026	Semi-finals	3rd	3	2	0	1	7	5
Total	6/6		22	12	6	4	57	14

== Current squad ==
The following 23 players were selected for the 2026 AFC U-17 Women's Asian Cup qualification in Aqaba, Jordan.

No.	Pos.	Player	Date of birth (age)	Club
	GK	Renata Al-Badayneh		
	GK	Malak Talib		
	GK	Reina Abu Jaber		
		Eman Al-Tamizi		
		Hala Assaf		
		Jayida Kamal		
		Janna Muhtaseb		
		Retal Salama		
		Layan D'mour		
		Sadeen Obeidat		
		Sadeen Al-Damen		
		Lia Marar		
		Noha Al-Qaisi		
		Riana Issa		
		Celine Ghazal		
		Leen Abu Halwa		
		Leen Al-Qaisi		
		Lamar Youssef		
		Haya Abu Ali		
		Mira Jarrar		
		Janna Masri		
		Alma Al-Saifi		
		Dana Abu Hazeem		

=== Recent call-ups ===
The following players have previously been called up to the Jordan under-17 squad and remain eligible.

Pos.	Player	Date of birth (age)	Caps	Goals	Club	Latest call-up

== Head-to-head record ==
The following table shows Jordan's head-to-head record in the FIFA U-17 Women's World Cup.

Opponent	Pld	W	D	L	GF	GA	GD	Win %
Mexico	1	0	0	1	1	4	−3	0.00
New Zealand	1	0	0	1	0	5	−5	0.00
Spain	1	0	0	1	0	6	−6	0.00
Total	3	0	0	3	1	15	−14	0.00

== See also ==
- Jordan women's national football team
- Jordan women's national under-20 football team
