= 2022 WAFF Women's Championship =

7th edition of the WAFF Women's Championship

بطولة اتحاد غرب آسيا السابعة للسيدات

Tournament details
- Host country: Jordan
- City: Amman
- Dates: 29 August – 4 September
- Teams: 4 (from 1 sub-confederation)
- Venue: 1 (in 1 host city)

Final positions
- Champions: Jordan (5th title)
- Runners-up: Lebanon
- Third place: Syria
- Fourth place: Palestine

Tournament statistics
- Matches played: 6
- Goals scored: 23 (3.83 per match)
- Attendance: 2,498 (416 per match)
- Top scorer: (Jordan) Maysa Jbarah (6 goals)
- Best player: (Lebanon) Lili Iskandar
- Best goalkeeper: (Jordan) Rawand Kassab

The 2022 WAFF Women's Championship was the seventh edition of the WAFF Women's Championship, the international women's football championship of Western Asia organised by the West Asian Football Federation (WAFF). It was held in Amman, Jordan from 29 August to 4 September 2022.

Hosts Jordan won their fifth title – and third in a row – after finishing top of their group with three wins in three games. Lebanon finished second, winning two, while Syria and Palestine finished third and fourth respectively, with one draw and two defeats each.

== Teams ==
=== Participants ===
Five teams from the West Asian Football Federation (WAFF) entered the tournament; the official draw took place at the WAFF headquarters in Amman, Jordan on 15 August 2022. The United Arab Emirates were due to compete, but withdrew prior to the start of the competition.

Country	Appearance	Previous best performance	FIFA ranking August 2022
Jordan	7th	Champions (2005, 2007, 2014, 2019)	66
Palestine	6th	Runners-up (2014)	130
Lebanon	4th	Third place (2007, 2019)	143
Syria	4th	Third place (2005)	NR

=== Squads ===
Each team had to register a squad of 23 players, minimum three of whom must be goalkeepers.

== Group stage ==
Team	Pld	W	D	L	GF	GA	GD	Pts
Jordan (H, C)	3	3	0	0	10	1	+9	9
Lebanon	3	2	0	1	9	4	+5	6
Syria	3	0	1	2	3	10	−7	1
Palestine	3	0	1	2	1	8	−7	1

Source: Global Sports Archive
(C) Champions; (H) Hosts
29 August 2022
17:00

Palestine	0–3	Lebanon
	Report	Fayad 10'; Maalouf 74'; Iskandar 90+2'

Petra Stadium, Amman
Attendance: 200
Referee: Alesar Baddour (Syria)
29 August 2022
21:00

Jordan	4–0	Syria
Jbarah 11', 61', 89'; Al-Bitar 66'	Report

Petra Stadium, Amman
Attendance: 500
Referee: Doumouh Al Bakkar (Lebanon)

1 September 2022
17:00

Syria	1–1	Palestine
Hammou 52'	Report	Abed 46'

Petra Stadium, Amman
Attendance: 200
Referee: Ahmed Kadhim Gatea (Iraq)
1 September 2022
21:00

Lebanon	1–2	Jordan
Arabi 51'	Report	Al-Bitar 26'; Al-Btoush 66'

Petra Stadium, Amman
Attendance: 498
Referee: Muath Owfi (Palestine)

4 September 2022
17:00

Lebanon	5–2	Syria
Oghlan 9' (o.g.); Azzi 42'; Maalouf 51'; Allouch 62'; Khoury 68'	Report	Gharib 73'; Mohammad 90+1'

Petra Stadium, Amman
Attendance: 100
Referee: Esra'a Al Mbaidin (Jordan)
4 September 2022
21:00

Jordan	4–0	Palestine
Jbarah 23', 59', 73'; Al-Bitar 50'	Report

Petra Stadium, Amman
Attendance: 1,000
Referee: Doumouh Al Bakkar (Lebanon)

== Statistics ==
=== Goalscorers ===
There were 23 goals scored in 6 matches, for an average of 3.83 goals per match.

6 goals

- (Jordan) Maysa Jbarah

3 goals

- (Jordan) Bana Al-Bitar

2 goals

- (Lebanon) Christy Maalouf

1 goal

- (Jordan) Leen Al Btoush
- (Lebanon) Hiba Allouch
- (Lebanon) Zahwa Arabi
- (Lebanon) Joya-Maria Azzi
- (Lebanon) Sophie Fayad
- (Lebanon) Lili Iskandar
- (Lebanon) Pilar Khoury
- (Palestine) Aya Abed
- (Syria) Roaa Gharib
- (Syria) Aysha Hammou
- (Syria) Aya Mohammad

1 own goal

- (Syria) Elham Kord Oghlan (against Lebanon)

=== Awards ===
The following awards were given at the conclusion of the tournament.

Award	Player
Top scorer	(Jordan) Maysa Jbarah (6 goals)
Best player	(Lebanon) Lili Iskandar
Best goalkeeper	(Jordan) Rawand Kassab

== See also ==
- 2022 AFC Women's Asian Cup
- 2022 AFF Women's Championship
- 2022 CAFA Women's Championship
- 2022 EAFF E-1 Football Championship (women)
- 2022 SAFF Women's Championship
