= 2019 WAFF U-15 Girls Championship =

بطولة اتحاد غرب آسيا الثانية للناشئات الأردن ٢٠١٩

Tournament details
- Host country: Jordan
- City: Amman
- Dates: 12–16 December
- Teams: 4 (from 1 sub-confederation)
- Venue(s): 1 (in 1 host city)

Final positions
- Champions: Lebanon (1st title)
- Runners-up: Jordan
- Third place: Syria
- Fourth place: Palestine

Tournament statistics
- Matches played: 6
- Goals scored: 21 (3.5 per match)
- Top scorer(s): (Lebanon) Christy Maalouf (9 goals)
- Best player(s): (Lebanon) Amina Karime
- Best goalkeeper: (Jordan) Hadeel Al-Zawaidah

The 2019 WAFF U-15 Girls Championship was the second edition of the WAFF U-15 Girls Championship, an international women's football youth tournament organised by the West Asian Football Federation for the women's under-15 national teams of West Asia. Initially, Lebanon was scheduled to host the tournament from December 12 to 16, featuring four teams, with players born on or after 1 January 2004 eligible to participate. In November 2019, it was announced that the hosting rights had been reallocated to Jordan, which would serve as the new host.

Jordan were the defending champions, having won last year's edition in the United Arab Emirates. However, they failed to defend their title, falling to Lebanon on the second match day. On the other hand, Lebanon went on to win their first title undefeated.

== Participation ==
=== Participating teams ===
Four (out of 12) WAFF nations entered the final competition.

Team	App.	Previous best performance
Jordan	2nd	Champions (2018)
Lebanon	2nd	Runners-up (2018)
Palestine	2nd	Third place (2018)
Syria	2nd	Group Stage (2018)

Did not enter

- Bahrain
- Iraq
- Kuwait
- Oman
- Qatar
- Saudi Arabia
- United Arab Emirates
- Yemen

=== Draw ===
The final draw was held on 21 November 2019, at West Asian Football Federation Headquarters in Amman, Jordan.

== Main tournament ==
All times are local, AST (UTC+3).

Pos	Team	Pld	W	D	L	GF	GA	GD	Pts	Final result
1	Lebanon	3	3	0	0	14	0	+14	9	Champions
2	Jordan (H)	3	1	1	1	5	2	+3	4	Runners-up
3	Syria	3	1	1	1	1	7	−6	4	Third place
4	Palestine	3	0	0	3	1	12	−11	0	Fourth place

Source: WAFF
Rules for classification: Group stage tiebreakers
(H) Hosts
12 December 2019
15:00

Palestine	0–7	Lebanon
	Report	Maalouf 44', 49', 56', 69'; Raed 62'; Abdine 73'

Polo Stadium, Amman
Referee: Mohammad Shebeeb (Iraq)
12 December 2019
18:00

Jordan	0–0	Syria
	Report

Polo Stadium, Amman
Referee: Baraa Abu Aisha (Palestine)

14 December 2019
15:00

Syria	1–0	Palestine
Noureddin 24'	Report

Polo Stadium, Amman
Referee: Doumouh Al Bakkar (Lebanon)
14 December 2019
18:00

Lebanon	1–0	Jordan
Karime 38'	Report

Polo Stadium, Amman
Referee: Mohammad Qanah (Syria)

16 December 2019
15:00

Lebanon	7–0	Syria
Korjieh 18'; Maalouf 23', 66', 74', 79', 90+4'; Abdine 41'	Report

Polo Stadium, Amman
Referee: Israa Al-Mubaideen (Jordan)
16 December 2019
18:00

Jordan	5–1	Palestine
Abo-AlSondos 27', 80'; Shuwayyat 42'; AlTmaizy 57'; Qumseya 90+2' (o.g.)	Report	Qassis 49'

Polo Stadium, Amman
Referee: Doumouh Al Bakkar (Lebanon)

== Champion ==
2019 WAFF U-15 Girls Championship champion

Lebanon
First title

== Player awards ==
The following awards were given at the conclusion of the tournament:

Top Goalscorer	Best player	Best Goalkeeper
(Lebanon) Christy Maalouf	(Lebanon) Amina Karime	(Jordan) Hadeel Al-Zawaidah

== Goalscorers ==
There were 21 goals scored in 6 matches, for an average of 3.5 goals per match.

9 goals

- (Lebanon) Christy Maalouf

2 goals

- (Jordan) Rama Abo-AlSondos
- (Lebanon) Lama Abdine

1 goal

- (Jordan) Tuleen Shuwayyat
- (Jordan) Sara AlTmaizy
- (Lebanon) Waed Raed
- (Lebanon) Amina Karime
- (Lebanon) Jana Korjieh
- (Palestine) Miral Qassis
- (Syria) Tala Noureddin

1 own goal

- (Palestine) Yuliana Qumseya
