= Doumouh Al Bakkar =

Lebanese football referee (born 1990)

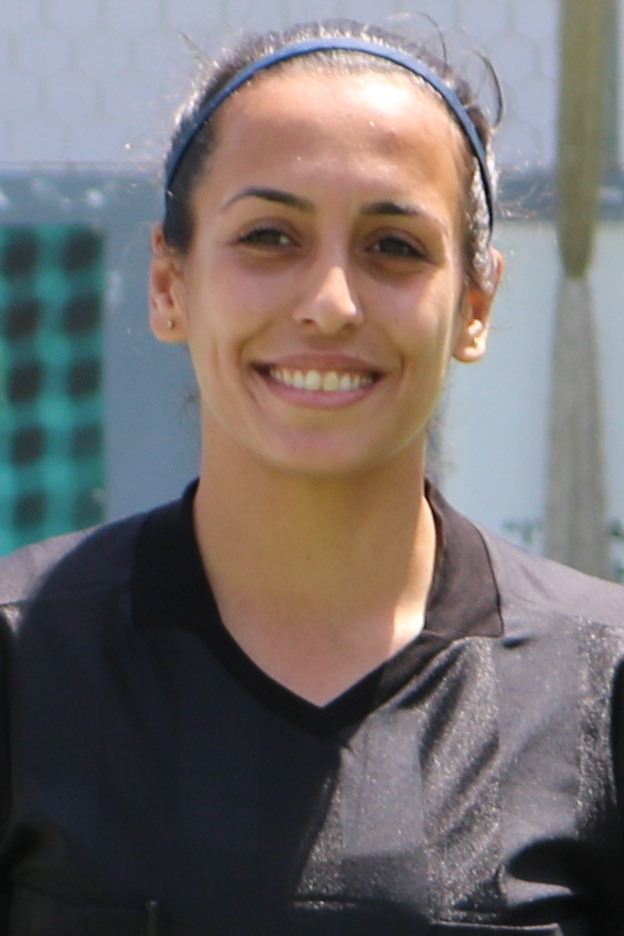
- Al Bakkar in 2021
- Full name: Doumouh Ibrahim Al Bakkar
- Born: 7 April 1990 (age 36); Tripoli, Lebanon
- Other occupation: Human Resources Manager

Domestic
Years	League	Role
2014–	Women's League	Referee
2017–	Fourth Division	Referee
2017–	Third Division	Referee
2017–	Second Division	Referee
2021–	Premier League	Referee

International
Years	League	Role
2016–	FIFA listed	Referee
2018–	AFC Elite	Referee

Doumouh Ibrahim Al Bakkar (Arabic: دموع ابراهيم البقار; born 7 April 1990) is a Lebanese football referee who officiates primarily in the Lebanese Women's Football League.

Starting out as a player and coach, Al Bakkar became a referee in 2014. In addition to women's matches, she has also officiated men's matches domestically, at both senior and youth level. Al Bakkar has refereed in various women's international competitions, such as the AFC Olympic Qualifying Tournament, AFC Asian Cup qualification, Arab Cup, Southeast Asian Games and WAFF Championship. She was also part of the refereeing team in the 2017 Summer Universiade final. In 2021, Al Bakkar became the first woman to officiate a Lebanese Premier League game.

== Early life ==
Born on 7 April 1990 in Tripoli, Lebanon, Al Bakkar studied at a private school in Zgharta. She practised various sports in school, which led her to play basketball for Shabab Al Azm and Homenetmen. After finishing her national diploma, Al Bakkar played football for Arabi Tripoli aged 16. Aged 19, she began coaching various girls teams.

== Career ==
Al Bakkar got interested in refereeing in 2014, when she attended a "Referees of Tomorrow" training course, organized by the Lebanese Football Association (LFA) in cooperation with lecturers from the Asian Football Confederation (AFC). She stated that there were eight women participating in the session, with her being the only one to pass the fitness test.

She began by officiating women's matches domestically in 2014, both in the youth league and the Lebanese Women's Football League. In 2016, Al Bakkar received the FIFA badge. She took part in the 2017 Summer Universiade in Taipei; she was the first referee in the quarter-final match between Canada and Brazil, and part of the refereeing team in the final between Japan and Brazil. The same year, Al Bakkar began officiating men's youth matches domestically, in addition to senior matches in the Second Division, Third Division, and Fourth Division.

In 2017, Al Bakkar officiated a men's friendly game between Lebanese Premier League sides Safa and Tadamon Sour, in the Safa Stadium in Beirut. Regarding her experience refereeing a match between two top-tier men's clubs, Al Bakkar stated that "some players were surprised at the idea of a woman officiating the game, others laughed. But of course, on the other hand, some were cooperative and offered me words of encouragement".

Al Bakkar was listed as an AFC Elite referee in 2018, which allowed her to officiated at the international level. She refereed in multiple matches in the 2019 AFC U-16 and U-19 Women's Championships, and in the 2020 AFC Women's Olympic Qualifying Tournament. Al Bakkar also officiated in the 2019 WAFF Women's Championship, as well as several other local and international competitions in the Middle East. Al Bakkar was one of two Lebanese referees to officiate the inaugural edition of the WAFF Women's Clubs Championship in 2019. She also refereed at the 2019 Southeast Asian Games.

Bakkar became the first woman to referee a Lebanese Premier League match on 17 April 2021, in the South derby between Chabab Ghazieh and Tadamon Sour. In 2021, she refereed in the 2021 Arab Women's Cup and the 2022 AFC Women's Asian Cup qualification, while in 2022 she officiated the 2022 WAFF Women's Championship.

== Personal life ==
Al Bakkar has a master's degree in political and administrative sciences at the Lebanese University, and worked as a Human Resources Manager at Baytna Foundation in her hometown Tripoli. Her husband, Maher Al Ali, also works as a referee.
