= Kuwait women's national under-17 football team =

Kuwait under-17
- Nickname(s): ناشئات الأزرق النسائي (The Girls's Blue)
- Association: Kuwait Football Association (الاتحاد الكويتي لكرة القدم)
- Confederation: AFC (Asia)
- Sub-confederation: WAFF (West Asia)
- Head coach: Nilufar Hodjaeva
- Home stadium: Jaber Al-Ahmad International Stadium
- FIFA code: KUW
First colours	Second colours

First international
- Bahrain 4–1 Kuwait (Isa Town, Bahrain; 29 December 2019)

Biggest win
- Kuwait 4–1 Saudi Arabia (Kuwait City, Kuwait; 4 March 2023)

Biggest defeat
- Kuwait 0–11 Saudi Arabia (Khobar, Saudi Arabia; 17 October 2025)

2026 AFC U-17 Women's Asian Cup qualification
- Appearances: 1 (first in 2019)
- Best result: 6th place

The Kuwait women's national under-17 football team (Arabic: منتخب الكويت لكرة القدم تحت 17 سنة للسيدات), represent Kuwait in international women's youth football. The team is governed by the Women's Committee of Kuwait Football Association (KFA). The team also serves as the women's national under-18 and women's national under-16 football team of Kuwait. The team comprises a diverse group of talented players, including Taibah Al Rayes, Tala Sultan, Shaikha Shabeeb, Wafa Al Mashaan, Layan Mousa, Noura Awad Al-Sarbel, Manayer Musaed Al-Mutairi, and Salma Saleh Al-Ajmi, among others.

== History ==
In 2019, the women's committee of the Kuwait football association launched for the first time the youth women's team, right away after its creation, the team held a training camp in the Austrian capital Vienna from 1 to 15 August 2019, as preparation for their first appearance in WAFF U-18 Girls Championship, during the camp they played three friendlies against youth teams of Austrian clubs.

In December 2019, the Kuwaiti U-17 team started its historic journey with a debut participation in WAFF U-18 Girls Championship hosted in neighboring Bahrain. Kuwait lost all its three matches to finish sixth out of seven.

The team came back to the international stage in 2023, where they hosted their Saudi counterpart who are competing in their first international game to play two friendly games on 4 and 8 March 2023.

== Fixtures and results ==
Legend Win Draw Fixture Lose

== Coaching staff ==
As of 4 March 2023

Position	Name
Head coach	(Uzbekistan) Nilufar Hodjaeva

=== Coaching history ===
- (Kuwait) Ali Al-Dhahi (2019–2020)
- (Uzbekistan) Nilufar Hodjaeva (2023–)

== Players ==
=== Current squad ===
The following players were named for the two friendly matches against Saudi Arabia on 4 and 8 March 2023.

No.	Pos.	Player	Date of birth (age)	Club
1	GK	Samya Ashoor		(Kuwait Football Association)
2	DF	Sara Jantoush		(Kuwait Football Association)
3	DF	Alaya Nouti		(Kuwait Football Association)
4	DF	Omaira Muhammad		(Kuwait Football Association)
5	MF	Jenniver Al Gamri		(Kuwait Football Association)
6	MF	Sabah Salmi		(Kuwait Football Association)
7	MF	Kurmatoun Zamzam		(Kuwait Football Association)
8	MF	Lynn Ayyad		(Kuwait Football Association)
9	FW	Noor Bellal		(Kuwait Football Association)
10	FW	Hayya Abdulhamad		(Kuwait Football Association)
11	FW	Christine Salib		(Kuwait Football Association)
12	GK	Eva Ghabbas		(Kuwait Football Association)
13	DF	Saniya Taibes		(Kuwait Football Association)
14	DF	Eiday Albuaini		(Kuwait Football Association)
15	DF	Lamaa Saber		(Kuwait Football Association)
16	MF	Shereen Shaheeb		(Kuwait Football Association)
17	MF	Eisabelle Zharsawi		(Kuwait Football Association)
18	MF	Stephanie Altaqi		(Kuwait Football Association)
19	MF	Noufe Zaki		(Kuwait Football Association)
20	FW	Michelle Zain Alabeddin		(Kuwait Football Association)
21	FW	Mariana Khedrouse		(Kuwait Football Association)
22	GK	Aysha Majnawi		(Kuwait Football Association)
23	FW	Malak Talawe		(Kuwait Football Association)
24	DF	Nada Fooad		(Kuwait Football Association)

== Competitive record ==
=== WAFF U-18 Women's Championship ===
WAFF U-18 Girls Championship record
Year	Round	Position	Pld	W	D*	L	GS	GA	GD
(Lebanon) 2018	did not exist								
(Bahrain) 2019	Sixth place	6th	3	0	0	3	1	13	−12
(Lebanon) 2022	did not enter								
Appearances	1/3	6th	3	0	0	3	1	13	−12

=== Arab U-17 Women's Cup ===
Arab U-17 Women's Cup
Appearances: 1
Year	Round	Position	Pld	W	D	L	GF	GA
(Qatar) 2015								
Total	0/1							

== See also ==
- Kuwait women's national football team
- Football in Kuwait
