= Women's football in Yemen =

Summary of women's association football in Yemen

- Country: Yemen
- Governing body: Yemen Football Association
- National team: None (as of 2024)
- First played: 2005; 21 years ago
- Registered players: 160 (as of 2006)
- Clubs: 6 senior, 3 youth (as of 2009)

Women's football in Yemen has no active senior national team representing the country. Women's association football in Yemen is governed by the Yemen Football Association (YFA).

== History ==
=== Background and development ===
The national federation was founded in 1962 and became a FIFA affiliate in 1980. The federation had four dedicated staffers for women's football. Representation of women's football on the board is required as part of a wider mandate connected to women's football. As of 2009, 26% of the federation's budget is dedicated to men's football while only 4% is dedicated to a category for technical development, which includes women's football, refereeing, futsal and sports medicine.

The development of women's football in the Middle East and central Asia dates back only about ten years. In 2005, a women's football programme was set up in the country. In 2006, there were 160 registered female footballers, 110 of whom were adult players and 50 of whom were junior players. This was an increase from 15 in 2005. In 2006, there were 360 football teams in the country, zero of which were open to women. By 2009 there were six senior women's teams and three junior women's teams.

=== Team ===
A FIFA recognised national team setup existed in 2006, which had four training sessions a week. In 2006, the country also had an under-18 program which also had four training sessions a week. However, no teams representing Yemen played a game between 2002 and 2006. The national team setup still existed in 2009. By 2024, Yemen still had not played a women's international match and was not ranked in the world by FIFA.

=== Players ===
A few Yemeni players have played in professional leagues, most notably striker Hadeel Jehran with Al-Ula in the Saudi Women's Premier League, defender Sumaya Jabran with Al-Orobah in the Saudi Women's Second Division League. and Agawad Faranti with Al-Yarmouk in the Saudi Women's First Division League.
