= 2018 WAFF U-15 Girls Championship =

بطولة اتحاد غرب آسيا الأولى للناشئات الإمارات ٢٠١٨

Tournament details
- Host country: United Arab Emirates
- City: Dubai
- Dates: 7–15 April
- Teams: 6 (from 1 sub-confederation)
- Venue(s): 1 (in 1 host city)

Final positions
- Champions: Jordan (1st title)
- Runners-up: Lebanon
- Third place: Palestine
- Fourth place: Bahrain

Tournament statistics
- Matches played: 11
- Goals scored: 59 (5.36 per match)
- Top scorer(s): (Jordan) Aleen Al Sweilmin (6 goals)
- Best player(s): (Jordan) Enas Al-Jamaeen
- Best goalkeeper: (Bahrain) Zahra Ali

The 2018 WAFF U-15 Girls Championship was the inaugural edition of the WAFF U-15 Girls Championship, an international women's football youth tournament organised by the West Asian Football Federation for the women's under-15 national teams of West Asia. the United Arab Emirates hosted the tournament from 7 to 15 April in Dubai. A total of six teams played in the tournament, with players born on or after 1 January 2003 eligible to participate.

Jordan claimed the title, being crowned the first-ever champions, after beating Lebanon on penalties in the final.

== Participation ==
=== Participating teams ===
Six (out of 12) WAFF nations entered the final competition.

Team	App.	Previous best performance
Bahrain	1st	Debut
Jordan	1st	Debut
Lebanon	1st	Debut
Palestine	1st	Debut
Syria	1st	Debut
United Arab Emirates	1st	Debut

=== Draw ===
The final draw was held on 6 April 2018, 10:00 GST, at UAE Football Association headquarters in Dubai, the United Arab Emirates.

== Group stage ==
The group winners and runners-up advanced to the semi-finals, while the third-placed teams competed in the 5th place playoff.

All times are local, GST (UTC+4)

=== Group A ===
Pos	Team	Pld	W	D	L	GF	GA	GD	Pts	Qualification
1	Palestine	2	2	0	0	5	3	+2	6	Knockout stage
2	Bahrain	2	1	0	1	4	4	0	3	Knockout stage
3	United Arab Emirates (H)	2	0	0	2	2	4	−2	0	Fifth place match

Source: WAFF
Rules for classification: Group stage tiebreakers
(H) Hosts
7 April 2018
16:20

Bahrain	2–3	Palestine
Charafedein 38', 73'	Report	Bawatneh 52'; Shattara 78'; Fawwaqa 52'

Theyab Awana Stadium
Referee: Doumouh Al Bakkar (Lebanon)

9 April 2018
19:20

Palestine	2–1	United Arab Emirates
Al Shakhshir 27'; Fawwaqa 58'	Report	Al Zarkan 49'

Theyab Awana Stadium
Referee: Khalid Al Shaqsi (Oman)

11 April 2018
19:20

United Arab Emirates	1–2	Bahrain
Al Zaabi 61'	Report	Al Mahmood 1'; Khaled 45'

Theyab Awana Stadium
Referee: Wissam Rabie (Syria)

=== Group B ===
Pos	Team	Pld	W	D	L	GF	GA	GD	Pts	Qualification
1	Jordan	2	2	0	0	19	1	+18	6	Knockout stage
2	Lebanon	2	1	0	1	6	4	+2	3	Knockout stage
3	Syria	2	0	0	2	0	20	−20	0	Fifth place match

Source: WAFF
Rules for classification: Group stage tiebreakers
7 April 2018
19:20

Syria	0–15	Jordan
	Report	Al-Sweilmin 7', 16', 62'; Al-Jamaeen 13', 42', 55'; Al-Maiah 14', 23', 41', 60'; Al-Btoosh 25', 81'; Al-Hadidi 71'; Hassan 77', 89'

Theyab Awana Stadium
Referee: Mohammed Juma (Bahrain)

9 April 2018
16:40

Jordan	4–1	Lebanon
Al-Jamaeen 65'; Qadoura 80'; Al-Sweilmin 82', 86'	Report	Maalouf 38'

Theyab Awana Stadium
Referee: Hamad Ali (United Arab Emirates)

11 April 2018
16:20

Lebanon	5–0	Syria
Salha 26', 39'; AlAbed 59', 64'; Mansour 68'	Report

Theyab Awana Stadium
Referee: Omar Al Miani (Jordan)

== Placement matches ==
The host, the United Arab Emirates, finished fifth after defeating Syria in the 5th place match.

=== Fifth place match ===
14 April 2018
16:30

United Arab Emirates	5–1	Syria
Al Zarkan 19', 28'; Al Mazrouei 45+3'; Al Zaabi 54'; Marouf 89' (o.g.)	Report	Gharib 8'

Theyab Awana Stadium
Referee: Omar Al Miani (Jordan)

== Knockout stage ==
Semi-finals
13 April - Dubai
Palestine	1
Lebanon	7
13 April - Dubai
Jordan	5
Bahrain	0

Final
24 June - [Dubai
Lebanon	1 (3)
Jordan (p)	1 (4)
Third Place
24 June - Dubai
Palestine	2
Bahrain	0

=== Semi-finals ===
13 April 2018
16:30

Palestine	1–7	Lebanon
Shattara 25'	Report	Maalouf 4', 16'; El Tayar 48', 76'; Allouch 83'; Assaf 88'; Jaffar 90'

Theyab Awana Stadium
Referee: Hamad Ali (United Arab Emirates)
13 April 2018
19:30

Jordan	5–0	Bahrain
Hassan 8', 48'; Qaddourah 19'; Al-Jamaeen 20'; Al-Sweilmin 65'	Report

Theyab Awana Stadium
Referee: Emad Bojeh (Palestine)

=== Third place match ===
15 April 2018
16:30

Palestine	2–0	Bahrain
Bawatneh 4', 60'	Report

Theyab Awana Stadium
Referee: Doumouh Al Bakkar (Lebanon)

=== Final ===
15 April 2018
19:30

Lebanon	1–1 (a.e.t.)	Jordan
Maalouf 9'	Report	Qaddourah 41'
Penalties
Fayadh (penalty scored); Mansour (penalty scored); Assaf (penalty scored)	3–4	(penalty scored) Al Sweilmin; (penalty scored) Al-Jamaeen; (penalty scored) Al Maiah; (penalty scored) Hassan

Theyab Awana Stadium
Referee: Mohammed Juma (Bahrain)

== Champion ==
2018 WAFF U-15 Girls Championship champion

Jordan
First title

== Player awards ==
The following awards were given at the conclusion of the tournament:

Top Goalscorer	Best player	Best Goalkeeper
(Jordan) Aleen Al-Sweilmin	(Jordan) Enas Al-Jamaeen	(Bahrain) Zahra Ali

== Goalscorers ==
There were 59 goals scored in 11 matches, for an average of 5.36 goals per match.

6 goals

- (Jordan) Aleen Al-Sweilmin

5 goals

- (Jordan) Enas Al-Jamaeen

4 goals

- (Jordan) Lina Al-Maiah
- (Jordan) Zaina Hassan
- (Lebanon) Christy Maalouf

3 goals

- (Jordan) Joud Qaddourah
- (Palestine) Dana Bawatneh
- (United Arab Emirates) Shahd Al Zarkan

2 goals

- (Bahrain) Dana Charafedein
- (Jordan) Lujain Al-Btoosh
- (Lebanon) Syntia Salha
- (Lebanon) Nathalie AlAbed
- (Lebanon) Farah El Tayar
- (Palestine) Jeniver Shattara
- (Palestine) Leen Fawwaqa
- (United Arab Emirates) Aalya Al Zaabi

1 goal

- (Bahrain) Aneesa Al Mahmood
- (Bahrain) Maryam Khaled
- (Jordan) Shaima Al-Hadidi
- (Lebanon) Maria Mansour
- (Lebanon) Hiba Allouch
- (Lebanon) Zahraa Assaf
- (Lebanon) Lina Jaffar
- (Palestine) Sara Al Shakhshir
- (Syria) Roaa Gharib
- (United Arab Emirates) Sendya Al Mazrouei

1 own goal

- (Syria) Ranim Marouf

== Final ranking ==
Pos	Team	Pld	W	D	L	GF	GA	GD	Pts	Final result
1	Jordan	4	3	1	0	25	2	+23	10	Champions
2	Lebanon	4	2	1	1	14	6	+8	7	Runners-up
3	Palestine	4	3	0	1	8	10	−2	9	Third place
4	Bahrain	4	1	0	3	4	11	−7	3	Fourth place
5	United Arab Emirates	3	1	0	2	7	5	+2	3	Fifth place
6	Syria	3	0	0	3	1	25	−24	0	Sixth place

Source: WAFF
