= WAFF Women's Championship =

West Asian association football tournament for women's national teams

- Founded: 2005; 21 years ago
- Region: West Asia (WAFF)
- Teams: 4 (2022)
- Current champions: Jordan (6th title)
- Most championships: Jordan (6 titles)
- 2025 WAFF Women's Championship

The WAFF Women's Championship (Arabic: بطولة غرب آسيا للسيدات) is the international football tournament organised by the West Asian Football Federation (WAFF) for the women's national teams of West Asia.

The championship has been held, on average, every two to three years. The first edition was held in 2005, with hosts Jordan winning the competition. Jordan are also the current champions, having won the 2024 edition, and are the most successful team with six titles. The United Arab Emirates have won the other two titles.

== Results ==
Edition	Year	Host	Final			Third place match		
Edition	Year	Host	Winner	Score	Runner-up	Third place	Score	Fourth place
1	2005 details	Jordan	Jordan	(Note: A round-robin tournament determined the final standings.)	Iran	Syria		Bahrain
2	2007 details	Jordan	Jordan		Iran	Lebanon		Syria
3	2010 details	United Arab Emirates	United Arab Emirates	1–0; Abu Dhabi	Jordan	Bahrain	3–0; Abu Dhabi	Palestine
4	2011 details	United Arab Emirates	United Arab Emirates	2–2 (a.e.t.) (6–5 (p))	Iran	Bahrain	0–0 (a.e.t.) (4–3 (p))	Jordan
5	2014 details	Jordan	Jordan		Palestine	Bahrain		Qatar
6	2019 details	Bahrain	Jordan		Bahrain	Lebanon		United Arab Emirates
7	2022 details	Jordan	Jordan		Lebanon	Syria		Palestine
8	2024 details	Saudi Arabia	Jordan	2–2 (5–3 (p))	Nepal	Lebanon and Palestine		
9	2025 details	Saudi Arabia	Jordan	3–1	Palestine	Iraq	2–2 (4–2 (p))	Saudi Arabia

=== Teams reaching the top four ===
Teams reaching the top four
Team	Titles	Runners-up	Third place	Fourth place	Semi-finalists	Total
Jordan	7 (2005^{*}, 2007^{*}, 2014^{*}, 2019, 2022^{*}, 2024, 2025)	1 (2010)		1 (2011)		9
United Arab Emirates	2 (2010^{*}, 2011^{*})			1 (2019)		3
Iran		3 (2005, 2007, 2011)				3
Palestine		2 (2014, 2025)		2 (2010, 2022)	1 (2024)	5
Bahrain		1 (2019^{*})	3 (2010, 2011, 2014)	1 (2005)		5
Lebanon		1 (2022)	2 (2007, 2019)		1 (2024)	4
Syria			2 (2005, 2022)	1 (2007)		3
Iraq			1 (2025)			1
Qatar				1 (2014)		1
Saudi Arabia				1 (2025)		1
Invitees
Nepal		1 (2024)				1

* = hosts

== Records and statistics ==
=== Summary ===
Rank	Team	Part	M	W	D	L	GF	GA	GD	Points
1	Jordan	7	26	22	2	2	115	14	+101	68
2	Iran	4	14	9	1	4	58	16	+42	28
3	Bahrain	5	20	7	4	9	46	48	–2	25
4	United Arab Emirates	3	13	7	3	3	36	15	+21	24
5	Lebanon	4	13	6	0	7	26	29	–3	18
6	Palestine	6	21	4	3	14	33	83	–50	15
7	Syria	4	13	2	1	10	11	60	–49	7
8	Qatar	1	3	0	0	3	2	19	–17	0
9	Iraq	1	2	0	0	2	0	19	–19	0
10	Kuwait	1	2	0	0	2	0	24	–24	0

== Under-age tournaments ==
=== Under-20 ===
Edition	Year	Host	Final			Third place match		
Edition	Year	Host	Winner	Score	Runner-up	Third place	Score	Fourth place
2018: WAFF U-18 Women's Championship
1	2018 details	Lebanon	Jordan	(Note: There was no official final match in 2018. The tournament winner was decided by a round-robin group contested by three teams (Lebanon, Jordan, and Palestine). Coincidentally, the last match of the tournament pitted the two top ranked teams against each other, with Jordan's victory over Lebanon thus being considered as the de facto final of the 2018 WAFF U-18 Women's Championship.); 2–1	Lebanon	Palestine	(Note: Only three teams participated.)	
2019–2024: WAFF U-18 Girls Championship
2	2019 details	Bahrain	Lebanon	3–0	Bahrain	Jordan	3–1	Palestine
3	2022 details	Lebanon	Lebanon A	5–1	Syria	Jordan	2–1	Lebanon B
4	2024 details	Jordan	Jordan		Lebanon	Palestine		Saudi Arabia
Since 2025: WAFF U-20 Girls Championship
5	2025 details	Jordan	Palestine	1–1 (4–2 p)	Jordan	Syria	7–1	Kuwait
6	2026 details	Jordan						

Notes

Teams reaching the top four
Team	Titles	Runners-up	Third place	Fourth place	Total
Jordan	2 (2018, 2024)	1 (2025^{*})	2 (2019, 2022)		5
Lebanon	2 (2019, 2022^{*})	2 (2018^{*}, 2024)			4
Palestine	1 (2025)		2 (2019, 2024)	1 (2019)	4
Syria		1 (2022)	1 (2025)		2
Bahrain		1 (2019^{*})			1
Lebanon B				1 (2022^{*})	1
Saudi Arabia				1 (2024)	1
Kuwait				1 (2025)	1

* = hosts

=== Under-17 ===
Edition	Year	Host	Final			Third place match		
Edition	Year	Host	Winner	Score	Runner-up	Third place	Score	Fourth place
2018–2019: WAFF U-15 Girls Championship
1	2018 details	United Arab Emirates	Jordan	1–1 (a.e.t.) (4–3 (p))	Lebanon	Palestine	2–0	Bahrain
2	2019 details	Jordan	Lebanon	(Note: A round-robin tournament determined the final standings.)	Jordan	Syria		Palestine
2023: WAFF U-16 Girls Championship
3	2023 details	Jordan	Lebanon	2–0	Jordan	Palestine	2–1	Bahrain
Since 2023: WAFF U-17 Girls Championship
4	2023 details	Jordan	Syria	1–0	Jordan	Lebanon	2–0	Iraq
5	2025 details	Saudi Arabia	Lebanon	4–0	Syria	Jordan	2–0	Bahrain
4	2026 details	Jordan	Syria	2–2 (4–3 p)	Lebanon	Jordan and Palestine		

Notes

Teams reaching the top four
Team	Titles	Runners-up	Third place	Fourth place	Total
Lebanon	3 (2019, 2023, 2025)	2 (2018, 2026)	1 (2023)		6
Syria	2 (2023, 2026)	1 (2025)	1 (2019)		4
Jordan	1 (2018)	3 (2019^{*}, 2023^{*}, 2023^{*})	1 (2025)		5
Palestine			2 (2018, 2023)	1 (2019)	3
Bahrain				3 (2018, 2023, 2025)	3
Iraq				1 (2023)	1

* = hosts

=== Under-14 ===
Edition	Year	Host	Final			Third place match		
Edition	Year	Host	Winner	Score	Runner-up	Third place	Score	Fourth place
1	2022 details	Lebanon	Jordan	1–0	Lebanon A	Palestine	2–0	Lebanon B
2	2023 details	Jordan	Syria	1–0	Lebanon	Jordan A	2–0	Jordan B
3	2025 details	Saudi Arabia	Jordan	2-1	Lebanon	Palestine	1-1 (8-9 P)	Saudi Arabia

Teams reaching the top four
Team	Titles	Runners-up	Third place	Fourth place	Total
Jordan	1 (2022)		1 (2023^{*})		2
Syria	1 (2023)				1
Lebanon		1 (2022^{*}, 2023)			2
Palestine			1 (2022)		1
Lebanon B				1 (2022^{*})	1
Jordan B				1 (2023^{*})	1

* = hosts

== See also ==
- WAFF Championship
- AFF Women's Championship
- CAFA Women's Championship
- EAFF E-1 Football Championship (women)
- SAFF Women's Championship
- AFC Women's Asian Cup
