= Aya Al Jurdi =

Lebanese footballer (born 1998)

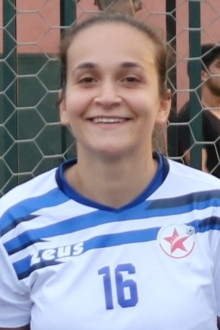
- Al Jurdi with SAS in 2020

Personal information
- Full name: Aya Kassem Al Jurdi
- Date of birth: 8 April 1998 (age 28)
- Place of birth: Aley, Lebanon
- Position: Defender

Senior career*
Years	Team	Apps	(Gls)
2014–2023	SAS		

International career
2015	Lebanon U17		(3)
2014	Lebanon U19		
2015–2023	Lebanon	10+	(1)
Medal record
Women's football
Representing Lebanon
WAFF Women's Championship
Silver medal – second place	2022
Bronze medal – third place	2019
Arab U-17 Women's Cup
Gold medal – first place	2015	U-17 Team
- * Club domestic league appearances and goals

Aya Kassem Al Jurdi (Arabic: أية قاسم الجردي; born 8 April 1998) is a Lebanese former footballer who played as a defender.

Al Jurdi played for SAS in the Lebanese Women's Football League between 2014 and 2023. At the international level, she won the 2015 Arab U-17 Women's Cup with Lebanon U17, and made her debut for the senior team in 2015, finishing runner-up at the 2022 WAFF Women's Championship.

== Club career ==
Al Jurdi played for Stars Association for Sports (SAS) from 2014 until April 2023, when she retired from football.

== International career ==
=== Youth ===
Al Jurdi was selected for the Lebanon national under-19 team squad for the qualifying tournament for the 2015 AFC U-19 Women's Championship, held in Jordan in November 2014.

In February 2015, she was part of the Lebanon under-17 team that won the 2015 Arab U-17 Women's Cup in Qatar. She scored in the group-stage matches against Djibouti and Qatar, and converted the penalty that gave Lebanon a 1–0 victory over Algeria in the semi-final. Lebanon went on to defeat Djibouti 1–0 in the final to win the tournament.

=== Senior ===
Al Jurdi made her senior international appearances for Lebanon between 2015 and 2023. She participated in the 2019 WAFF Women's Championship, where Lebanon finished third, and scored against Palestine in a 3–0 group-stage victory.

She was also part of the Lebanese team that finished as runners-up at the 2022 WAFF Women's Championship in Jordan. Her final recorded international appearance was against Chinese Taipei in an Olympic qualifying match on 5 April 2023.

== Career statistics ==
=== International ===
Scores and results list Lebanon's goal tally first, score column indicates score after each Al Jurdi goal.

List of international goals scored by Aya Al Jurdi
No.	Date	Venue	Opponent	Score	Result	Competition
1	15 January 2019	Shaikh Ali Bin Mohammed Stadium, Muharraq, Bahrain	Palestine	2–0	3–0	2019 WAFF Championship

== Honours ==
SAS

- Lebanese Women's Football League: 2018–19, 2019–20, 2021–22

Lebanon

- WAFF Women's Championship runner-up: 2022; third place: 2019

Lebanon U17

- Arab U-17 Women's Cup: 2015

== See also ==
- List of Lebanon women's international footballers
