= Ghiya Mtairek =

Lebanese footballer and runner (born 2000)

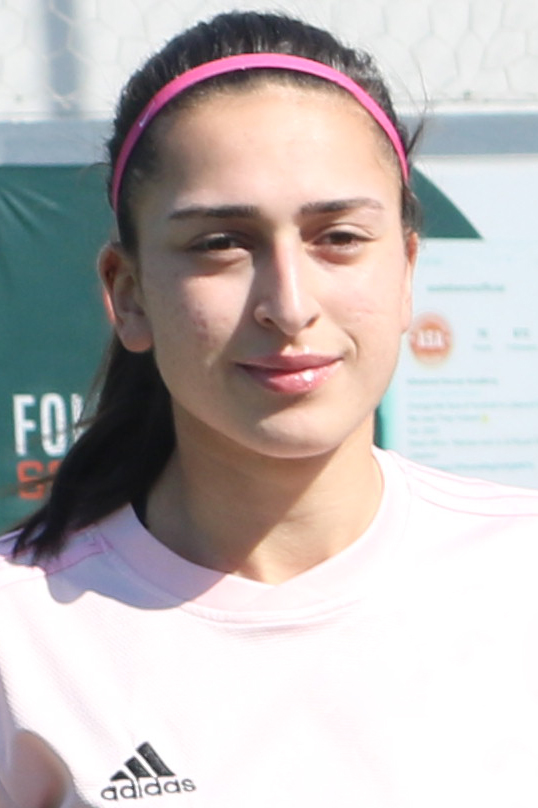
- Mtairek with Super Girls in 2021

Personal information
- Full name: Ghiya Mohamad Mtairek
- Date of birth: 9 January 2000 (age 26)
- Place of birth: Tyre, Lebanon
- Position: Winger

Senior career*
Years	Team	Apps	(Gls)
2018–2020	Southern Stars (Note: Terdeba Stars changed their name to Southern Stars in 2019.)		(20)
2020–2023	Super Girls	22	(6)
Total			(26)

International career
2021–2022	Lebanon	3	(0)
- * Club domestic league appearances and goals

Ghiya Mohamad Mtairek (Arabic: غيا محمد متيرك; born 9 January 2000) is a Lebanese long-distance runner and former footballer.

== Football career ==
Mtairek played for Terdeba Stars in the 2018–19 season, scoring four goals. She remained at the club during the 2019–20 season, when they changed their name to Southern Stars; she scored 16 goals. On 1 July 2020, Mtairek joined Super Girls.

Mtairek made her senior international debut for Lebanon on 8 April 2021, coming on as a substitute in a friendly tournament against Armenia.

== Running career ==
Mtairek is also a long-distance runner. She began running aged 9, at the Beirut Marathon, where she won the 5 km race of her age group. Mtairek participated in all Lebanese championships of her respective age group from 2009 to 2019.

In 2016 Mtairek, who was part of Phoenicia Club Tyre, participated with the Lebanese national team at the 2016 West Asian Junior Athletics Championships in Bahrain, finishing in fourth place in the 400 m women. She participated in the 2017 Limassol Marathon, finishing second in her category and fifth overall in the female 5 km race. Mtairek also participated the following year, finishing third in the female 5 km.

In 2018 Mtairek took part in the Ooredoo Marathon in Qatar, finishing second in the 5 km. In 2019, she won the Lebanese Universities Cross Country representing the Islamic University of Lebanon (IUL). Mtairek finished in second place in the 2019 Limassol Marathon female 5 km.

== See also ==
- List of Lebanon women's international footballers
