= Hanin Tamim =

Lebanese footballer (born 2000)

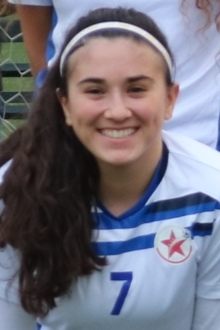
- Tamim with SAS in 2020

Personal information
- Full name: Hanin Maher Tamim
- Date of birth: 5 April 2000 (age 26)
- Place of birth: Beirut, Lebanon
- Height: 1.50 m (4 ft 11 in)
- Position: Forward

Youth career
- 2010–2013: FC Beirut
- 2013–2015: GFA

College career
Years	Team	Apps	(Gls)
2022	Lander Bearcats	12	(2)

Senior career*
Years	Team	Apps	(Gls)
2015–2018	GFA		
2018–2024	SAS		(29)
Total			(29+)

International career
2015	Lebanon U17		(1)
2014–2019	Lebanon U19	4	(1)
2018–2024	Lebanon	21	(8)
Medal record
Women's football
Representing Lebanon
WAFF Women's Championship
Bronze medal – third place	2019
WAFF U-18 Women's Championship
Silver medal – second place	2018	U-18 Team
Arab U-17 Women's Cup
Gold medal – first place	2015	U-17 Team
- * Club domestic league appearances and goals

Hanin Maher Tamim (Arabic: حنين ماهر تميم; born 5 April 2000) is a Lebanese former footballer who played as a forward. She played 21 games for the Lebanon national team between 2018 and 2024, scoring eight goals.

== Early life ==
Born and raised in Beirut, Lebanon, Tamim started playing football aged eight with her older brother and his friends. Aged 10, she started playing for FC Beirut's boys academy, stating that she "did not know that a girls team existed back then". Three years later, aged 13, she was scouted by Girls Football Academy (GFA) while playing football in her school, and joined the team.

== Club career ==
Coming through the youth system, Tamim spent three seasons at GFA playing in the Lebanese Women's Football League. She moved to Stars Association for Sports (SAS) – the league reigning champions – in 2018. Tamim helped SAS to a second-place finish at the inaugural 2019 WAFF Women's Clubs Championship; she described it as her favourite international experience.

On 27 May 2022, Tamim signed for the Lander Bearcats, the football team of Lander University in the United States.

== International career ==
Tamin had represented Lebanon internationally at under-17 and under-19 level, before making her senior debut on 8 November 2018, in a 8–0 defeat to Iran in the 2020 Summer Olympics qualifiers. She scored her first goal on 7 January 2019, with Lebanon losing to Bahrain 3–2 in the 2019 WAFF Championship. Tamim scored three goals, and helped Lebanon finish in third place.

On 24 October 2021, Tamim scored a brace in a 2022 AFC Asian Cup qualification game against Guam, which ended in a 3–0 win. She was called up to the 2024 WAFF Women's Championship.

== Personal life ==
Tamim studied three years at the American University of Beirut, with a focus in nutrition and dietetics. Shortly after a 10-month internship at a hospital in Lebanon, Tamim became a licensed dietitian.

While playing for the Lander Bearcats in 2022, Tamim majored in business administration and worked part-time as a graduate assistant at Lander University in Greenwood, South Carolina.

== Career statistics ==
=== International ===
Scores and results list Lebanon's goal tally first, score column indicates score after each Tamim goal.

List of international goals scored by Hanin Tamim
No.	Date	Venue	Opponent	Score	Result	Competition	Ref.
1	7 January 2019	Shaikh Ali Bin Mohammed Stadium, Muharraq, Bahrain	Bahrain	1–0	2–3	2019 WAFF Championship	
2	11 January 2019	Shaikh Ali Bin Mohammed Stadium, Muharraq, Bahrain	Jordan	1–3	1–3	2019 WAFF Championship	
3	15 January 2019	Shaikh Ali Bin Mohammed Stadium, Muharraq, Bahrain	Palestine	1–0	3–0	2019 WAFF Championship	
4	24 October 2021	Dolen Omurzakov Stadium, Bishkek, Kyrgyzstan	Guam	1–0	3–0	2022 AFC Asian Cup qualification	
5	24 October 2021	Dolen Omurzakov Stadium, Bishkek, Kyrgyzstan	Guam	3–0	3–0	2022 AFC Asian Cup qualification	
6	21 July 2023	Tripoli Municipal Stadium, Tripoli, Lebanon	Palestine	1–0	2–1	Friendly	
7	21 July 2023	Tripoli Municipal Stadium, Tripoli, Lebanon	Palestine	2–0	2–1	Friendly	
8	15 February 2024	Safa Stadium, Beirut, Lebanon	Syria	2–0	3–1	Friendly	

== Honours ==
SAS

- Lebanese Women's Football League: 2018–19, 2019–20, 2021–22, 2022–23
- Lebanese Women's FA Cup: 2018–19
- Lebanese Women's Super Cup: 2018
- WAFF Women's Clubs Championship runner-up: 2019

Lebanon U18

- WAFF U-18 Women's Championship runner-up: 2018

Lebanon U17

- Arab U-17 Women's Cup: 2015

Lebanon

- WAFF Women's Championship third place: 2019

== See also ==
- List of Lebanon women's international footballers
