= Algeria women's national under-17 football team =

Algeria
- Nickname: الأفناك (The Fennecs)
- Association: Algerian Football Federation
- Other affiliation: UAFA (Arab Nations)
- Confederation: CAF (Africa)
- Sub-confederation: UNAF (North Africa)
- Head coach: Wahiba Rahal
- Top scorer: Nihad Moudjer (2)
- Home stadium: Omar Hamadi Stadium
- FIFA code: ALG
First colours	Second colours

First international
- Algeria 6–0 Iraq (Doha, Qatar, 15 February 2015)

Biggest win
- Algeria 6–0 Iraq (Doha, Qatar, 15 February 2015)

Biggest defeat
- Cameroon 7–0 Algeria (Yaoundé, Cameroon, December 16, 2017)

African U-17 Women's World Cup qualification
- Appearances: 2 (first in 2018)
- Best result: Round 3 (2024)

FIFA U-17 Women's World Cup
- Appearances: None

The Algeria U-17 women's national football team (Arabic: منتخب الجزائر لكرة القدم للإناث ما تحت 17 سنة) represents Algeria in international women's football at the under-17 level. The team plays its home games at the Omar Hamadi Stadium in Algiers and is coached by Naïma Laouadi. Algeria played its first official competition in the 2018 African U-17 Women's World Cup Qualifying Tournament.

== History ==
=== Beginnings ===
The national team made its official debut in February 2015 at the inaugural edition of the Arab U-17 Women's Cup in Doha, Qatar. They began the competition with a 6–0 win over Iraq before losing to Palestine and Lebanon. They then lost to Palestine again in the third-place playoff and finished fourth.

In August 2017, the team made its continental debut in the African U-17 Women's World Cup qualification. Initially scheduled to play Mali in the first round, it received a walkover after Mali withdrew, advancing to the second round, where it faced Cameroon. Without a domestic championship for the age group, Algeria lost both matches. The first leg ended in a 4–0 defeat in Algiers, while the second leg resulted in a 7–0 loss in Yaoundé.

=== Return to Action ===
Following a period of inactivity exceeding 5 years, the Algerian Football Federation revealed in July 2023 that former Algerian international Wahiba Rahal had been appointed as the team's coach. The team engaged in the African Qualifiers for the 2024 FIFA U-17 Women's World Cup in the Dominican Republic. This marked their second appearance in history, and they were drawn to play a doubleheader against Benin.

== Fixtures and results ==
Legend

Win Draw Lose Fixture

== Coaching staff ==
=== Current coaching staff ===
As of 10 July 2023

Position	Name
Head coach	(Algeria) Wahiba Rahal
Assistant coach	(Algeria) Nassima Ben Mohamed
Goalkeeping coach	(Algeria) Nadjet Fedoul

=== Manager history ===
- (Algeria) Naïma Laouadi (2017)
- (Algeria) Wahiba Rahal (2023–present)

== Player ==
=== Current squad ===
- The following 21 players were called up for the 2025 African U-17 Women's World Cup qualification second round matches against Botswana.
- Match dates: 8 and 16 March 2025
- Opposition: Botswana

No.	Pos.	Player	Date of birth (age)	Club
		Hanane Sehoul		(Algerian Football Federation) Afak Relizane
		Zaza Rebbahi		(Algerian Football Federation) Afak Relizane
		Ibtissem Fellah		(Algerian Football Federation) Afak Relizane
		Touba Ahmed Bacha		(Algerian Football Federation) Afak Relizane
		Sabrina Benchiha		(Algerian Football Federation) CF Akbou
		Celine Iskounene	8 April 2008 (age 18)	(Algerian Football Federation) CF Akbou
		Tinhinane Izeraren		(Algerian Football Federation) CF Akbou
		Hanane Zahra Djouadou		(Algerian Football Federation) CF Akbou
		Raounak Boughara		(Algerian Football Federation) ASE Alger Centre
		Dounia Farah Derbal		(Algerian Football Federation) JF Khenchela
		Lina Khenfoussi		(Algerian Football Federation) JF Khenchela
		Amilia Akkouche		(Algerian Football Federation) O M'Chedallah
		Sirine Anfal Amara		(Algerian Football Federation) EA Sétif
		Dyhia Benkhelat		(Algerian Football Federation) CF Akbou
	GK	Ines Amelia Yahiaoui		(French Football Federation) VGA Saint-Maur
	FW	Mélissa Benkhikh		(French Football Federation) AAS Sarcelles
		Jasmine Mechmache		(French Football Federation) VGA Saint-Maur
		Assia Mehdi		(French Football Federation) AAS Sarcelles
	MF	Soleina Chennouf		(French Football Federation) Olympique Lyonnais
	MF	Assia Briki		(French Football Federation) Olympique Lyonnais
	GK	Hayden Baranes		(French Football Federation) SM Caen

== Records ==
=== Top goalscorers ===
#	Player	Year(s)	Goals	Caps	Ref.
1	Nihad Moudjer	2015	2	4	
2	Bouchra Achoub	2015	1	4	
2	Amira Chemain	2015	1	4	
2	Ferial Daoui	2015	1	4	
2	Mélissa Djernine	2015	1	4	
2	Kahina Ourbah	2015	1	4	

== Competitive record ==
=== FIFA U-17 Women's World Cup record ===
FIFA U-17 Women's World Cup
Appearances: 0
Year	Round	Position	Pld	W	D	L	GF	GA
(New Zealand) 2008	Did not enter							
(Trinidad and Tobago) 2010	Did not enter							
(Azerbaijan) 2012	Did not enter							
(Costa Rica) 2014	Did not enter							
(Jordan) 2016	Did not enter							
(Uruguay) 2018	Did not qualify							
(India) 2022	Did not enter							
(Dominican Republic) 2024	Did not qualify							
(Morocco) 2025	To be determined							
Total		0/8	0	0	0	0	0	0

=== African U-17 Cup of Nations for Women record ===
African U-17 Cup of Nations for Women
Appearances: 3
Year	Round	Position	Pld	W	D	L	GF	GA
2008	Did not enter							
2010	Did not enter							
2012	Did not enter							
2013	Did not enter							
2016	Did not enter							
2018	Round 1	–	2	2^{1}	0	2	0	11
2022	Did not enter							
2024	Round 3	–	4	1	0	3	2	10
2025	In progress							
Total	Round 3	3/9	6	3	0	5	2	21

- ^1Algeria qualified from the preliminary round by withdrawal of Mali.

=== UNAF U-17 Women's Tournament record ===
UNAF U-17 Women's Tournament
Appearances: 1
Year	Round	Position	Pld	W	D	L	GF	GA
(Tunisia) 2024	Did not enter							
Total	–	0/1	0	0	0	0	0	0

=== Arab U-17 Women's Cup ===
Arab U-17 Women's Cup record
Year	Round	Position	Pld	W	D*	L	GF	GA	GD
(Qatar) 2015	Third place Play-off	4th	4	1	0	3	8	7	+1
Appearances	1/1	4th	4	1	0	3	8	7	+1

== See also ==
- Algeria women's national football team
- Algeria women's national under-20 football team
