= 2026 AFC U-17 Women's Asian Cup squads =

The 2026 AFC U-17 Women's Asian Cup was an international women tournament held in China from 1–17 May 2026.

The age listed for each player is on 25 April 2026. The club listed is the club for which the player last played a competitive match prior to the tournament. A flag is included for coaches who are of a different nationality than their own national team.

== Group A ==
=== China ===
Head coach: Ma Xiaoxu

China announced their final squad.

| No. | Pos. | Player | Date of birth (age) | Caps | Goals | Club |
|---|---|---|---|---|---|---|
| 1 | GK | Niu Ziqi | 2 June 2009 (aged 16) | | | (Chinese Football Association) Shandong Jinghua |
| 2 | DF | Ouyang Rongxin | 29 January 2009 (aged 17) | | | (Chinese Football Association) Shenzhen 2028 |
| 3 | DF | Cai Xinlin | 18 May 2009 (aged 16) | | | (Chinese Football Association) Shanghai Shengli |
| 4 | DF | Chen Jiachun | 1 September 2010 (aged 15) | | | (Chinese Football Association) Guangzhou Yangcheng |
| 5 | DF | Yang Yuxuan | 17 May 2010 (aged 15) | | | (Chinese Football Association) Suzhou Sports School |
| 6 | DF | Zheng Niman | 11 October 2010 (aged 15) | | | (Chinese Football Association) Guangzhou Yangcheng |
| 7 | FW | Cheng Wandi | 6 November 2009 (aged 16) | | | (Chinese Football Association) Shanghai Shengli |
| 8 | MF | Zhao Siqing | 1 March 2009 (aged 17) | | | (Chinese Football Association) Suzhou Sports School |
| 9 | FW | Huang Qinyi | 29 July 2009 (aged 16) | | | (Chinese Football Association) Shanghai Shengli |
| 10 | MF | Yang Lan | 3 July 2010 (aged 15) | | | (Chinese Football Association) Sichuan Women's FC |
| 11 | FW | Liu Yuxi | 12 May 2010 (aged 15) | | | (Chinese Football Association) Sichuan Women's FC |
| 12 | GK | Bai Shuiling | 19 October 2009 (aged 16) | | | (Chinese Football Association) Shanghai Shengli |
| 13 | FW | Li Qixian | 26 February 2009 (aged 17) | | | (Chinese Football Association) Suzhou Sports School |
| 14 | DF | Li Yaqi | 4 March 2009 (aged 17) | | | (Chinese Football Association) Sichuan Women's FC |
| 15 | MF | Xu Xiaotang | 4 January 2010 (aged 16) | | | (Chinese Football Association) Suzhou Sports School |
| 16 | MF | Hu Cuiping | 19 June 2009 (aged 16) | | | (Chinese Football Association) Shenzhen 2028 |
| 17 | FW | Wang Chenxi | 26 February 2010 (aged 16) | | | (Chinese Football Association) Neijiang FA |
| 18 | FW | Wu Yichen | 18 March 2010 (aged 16) | | | (Chinese Football Association) Nanjing Football School |
| 19 | DF | Liu Yuchen | 12 May 2010 (aged 15) | | | (Chinese Football Association) Sichuan Women's FC |
| 20 | FW | Ju Zhitong | 8 September 2009 (aged 16) | | | (Chinese Football Association) Chongqing Yongchuan |
| 21 | DF | Xu Yue | 7 April 2010 (aged 16) | | | (Chinese Football Association) Shanghai Shengli |
| 22 | GK | Yu Qianna | 8 March 2009 (aged 17) | | | (Chinese Football Association) Yancheng Training Center |
| 23 | DF | Yang Ruixue | 8 January 2009 (aged 17) | | | (Chinese Football Association) Guangzhou Yangcheng |

=== Vietnam ===
Head coach: (Japan) Masahiko Okiyama

Vietnam announced their final squad on 1 April 2026.

| No. | Pos. | Player | Date of birth (age) | Caps | Goals | Club |
|---|---|---|---|---|---|---|
| 1 | GK | Lù Thị Thùy | 8 April 2009 (aged 17) | | | (Vietnam Football Federation) Than KSVN |
| 2 | DF | Nguyễn Dương Phương Nghi | 9 May 2009 (aged 16) | | | (Vietnam Football Federation) Ho Chi Minh City WFC |
| 3 | DF | Hoàng Thị Giang | 1 March 2009 (aged 17) | | | (Vietnam Football Federation) Ninh Binh FC |
| 4 | DF | Trương Yến Linh | 14 March 2010 (aged 16) | | | (Vietnam Football Federation) Ninh Binh FC |
| 5 | MF | Hà Yến Nhi | 24 June 2010 (aged 15) | | | (Vietnam Football Federation) Hanoi FC |
| 6 | MF | Nguyễn Thị Ngọc Ánh | 16 February 2010 (aged 16) | | | (Vietnam Football Federation) Hanoi FC |
| 7 | MF | Phan Thị Thu Phương | 13 March 2010 (aged 16) | | | (Vietnam Football Federation) Hanoi FC |
| 8 | DF | Phạm Thị Trang | 4 February 2009 (aged 17) | | | (Vietnam Football Federation) VFF |
| 9 | DF | Nguyễn Thị Linh Chi | 3 December 2009 (aged 16) | | | (Vietnam Football Federation) Ninh Binh FC |
| 10 | FW | Nguyễn Thị Minh Ánh | 29 July 2009 (aged 16) | | | (Vietnam Football Federation) Ninh Binh FC |
| 11 | MF | Nguyễn Thị Ngọc Ánh | 28 August 2009 (aged 16) | | | (Vietnam Football Federation) VFF |
| 12 | GK | Trần Thị Cẩm Mỹ | 1 July 2009 (aged 16) | | | (Vietnam Football Federation) Ho Chi Minh City WFC |
| 13 | DF | Ngô Hải Yến | 17 August 2009 (aged 16) | | | (Vietnam Football Federation) VFF |
| 14 | FW | Nguyễn Thị Thanh Lam | 19 May 2009 (aged 16) | | | (Vietnam Football Federation) Hanoi FC |
| 15 | MF | Nguyễn Thị Phương Thảo | 11 October 2010 (aged 15) | | | (Vietnam Football Federation) Ninh Binh FC |
| 16 | FW | Đoàn Thị Thu Hướng | 2 September 2009 (aged 16) | | | (Vietnam Football Federation) Than KSVN |
| 17 | MF | Lê Thị Hồng Thái | 3 March 2010 (aged 16) | | | (Vietnam Football Federation) Ho Chi Minh City WFC |
| 18 | DF | Đặng Hồ Thanh Phương | 3 September 2009 (aged 16) | | | (Vietnam Football Federation) Ho Chi Minh City WFC |
| 19 | MF | Đỗ Thị Hạ Vi | 9 September 2010 (aged 15) | | | (Vietnam Football Federation) Hanoi FC |
| 20 | MF | Nguyễn Khánh Ly | 20 April 2009 (aged 17) | | | (Vietnam Football Federation) Thai Nguyen |
| 21 | GK | Bùi Phương Thảo | 19 February 2010 (aged 16) | | | (Vietnam Football Federation) Ninh Binh FC |
| 22 | DF | Nguyễn Anh Thư | 20 April 2010 (aged 16) | | | (Vietnam Football Federation) Hanoi FC |
| 23 | DF | Trần Thị An | 10 April 2009 (aged 17) | | | (Vietnam Football Federation) Ninh Binh FC |

=== Thailand ===
Head coach: Thidarat Wiwasukhu

Thailand announced their final squad on 1 April 2026.

| No. | Pos. | Player | Date of birth (age) | Caps | Goals | Club |
|---|---|---|---|---|---|---|
| 1 | GK | Pimlapat Aeewong | 9 September 2009 (aged 16) | | | (Football Association of Thailand) Bangkok Women's FC |
| 2 | DF | Arisa Tamsakul | 9 June 2009 (aged 16) | | | (Football Association of Thailand) Chonburi Sports School |
| 3 | DF | Atitaya Nuthong | 29 October 2009 (aged 16) | | | (Football Association of Thailand) Nakhon Si Thammarat Sports School |
| 4 | DF | Similin Wongsuban | 15 August 2009 (aged 16) | | | (Football Association of Thailand) Nakhon Si Thammarat Sports School |
| 5 | DF | Bunyaphon Sonsi | 15 April 2009 (aged 17) | | | (Football Association of Thailand) BRU Burirat Academy |
| 6 | DF | Suracha Tanawat | 23 July 2009 (aged 16) | | | (Football Association of Thailand) Phranakorn FC |
| 7 | MF | Pattaramon Saengta | 9 August 2009 (aged 16) | | | (Football Association of Thailand) Chonburi Sports School |
| 8 | MF | Aunchidtha Homtago | 29 January 2009 (aged 17) | | | (Football Association of Thailand) Chonburi Sports School |
| 9 | FW | Thidawan Wangchin | 9 January 2009 (aged 17) | | | (Football Association of Thailand) Lampang Sports School |
| 10 | FW | Kurisara Limpawanich | 5 February 2009 (aged 17) | | | (Football Association of Thailand) BG-College of Asian Scholars |
| 11 | FW | Monthida Numnuan | 12 March 2009 (aged 17) | | | (Football Association of Thailand) Nakhon Si Thammarat Sports School |
| 12 | FW | Supansa Danique | 21 December 2009 (aged 16) | | | (Royal Dutch Football Association) Hera United |
| 13 | MF | Kawinthida Kikuntod | 16 January 2010 (aged 16) | | | (Football Association of Thailand) BG-College of Asian Scholars |
| 14 | MF | Warantorn Pongkoksi | 31 October 2011 (aged 14) | | | (Football Association of Thailand) Chonburi Sports School |
| 15 | DF | Warittha Janya | 1 April 2009 (aged 17) | | | (Football Association of Thailand) Lampang Sports School |
| 16 | DF | Napatsawan Suebsuan | 3 June 2009 (aged 16) | | | (Football Association of Thailand) Chonburi Sports School |
| 17 | FW | Miricah Murdoch | 6 August 2010 (aged 15) | | | (Football Australia) Meriden School |
| 18 | GK | Deenara Kordem | 11 February 2010 (aged 16) | | | (Football Association of Thailand) Nakhon Si Thammarat Sports School |
| 19 | FW | Nattatida Tirapalika | 7 January 2009 (aged 17) | | | (Football Association of Thailand) Nakhon Si Thammarat Sports School |
| 20 | MF | Zuzana Kordem | 11 February 2010 (aged 16) | | | (Football Association of Thailand) Nakhon Si Thammarat Sports School |
| 21 | MF | Papitchaya Krajangsaeng | 5 May 2009 (aged 16) | | | (Football Association of Thailand) Bangkok Sports School |
| 22 | GK | Thanaphon Sinsairam | 31 May 2010 (aged 15) | | | (Football Association of Thailand) BRU Burirat Academy |
| 23 | FW | Prawnapa Wisadchat | 19 August 2011 (aged 14) | | | (Football Association of Thailand) BRU Burirat Academy |

=== Myanmar ===
Head coach: (Japan) Kumiko Tashiro

Myanmar announced their final squad.

| No. | Pos. | Player | Date of birth (age) | Caps | Goals | Club |
|---|---|---|---|---|---|---|
| 1 | GK | Saung Pwint Phyu | 6 June 2011 (aged 14) | | | (Myanmar Football Federation) Young Lionesses |
| 2 | DF | Thae Ei Hlaing | 18 June 2009 (aged 16) | | | (Myanmar Football Federation) Ayeyawady |
| 3 | FW | Chit Pwint Aung | 1 December 2009 (aged 16) | | | (Myanmar Football Federation) Young Lionesses |
| 4 | FW | Myat Moe San | 21 April 2011 (aged 15) | | | (Myanmar Football Federation) Young Lionesses |
| 5 | FW | Win Yupar | 4 January 2011 (aged 15) | | | (Myanmar Football Federation) Young Lionesses |
| 6 | DF | Pin Myint Yan | 10 January 2009 (aged 17) | | | (Myanmar Football Federation) Young Lionesses |
| 7 | MF | Min Htone May Zitar | 28 September 2009 (aged 16) | | | (Myanmar Football Federation) Ayeyawady |
| 8 | MF | San San Htwe | 21 August 2011 (aged 14) | | | (Myanmar Football Federation) Young Lionesses |
| 9 | FW | Saung Thazin Oo | 5 September 2010 (aged 15) | | | (Myanmar Football Federation) Young Lionesses |
| 10 | FW | Shin Thant Phyu Sin Pyone | 6 June 2010 (aged 15) | | | (Myanmar Football Federation) Ayeyawady |
| 11 | FW | Yee Yee Phyo | 27 December 2010 (aged 15) | | | (Myanmar Football Federation) Young Lionesses |
| 12 | MF | Hnin Wint War Kyaw | 21 March 2009 (aged 17) | | | (Myanmar Football Federation) Young Lionesses |
| 13 | FW | Khin Myat Bhone Htut | 7 February 2011 (aged 15) | | | (Myanmar Football Federation) Young Lionesses |
| 14 | DF | Pyae Paing Hmue Eain | 21 January 2010 (aged 16) | | | (Myanmar Football Federation) Young Lionesses |
| 15 | DF | Thaw Dar Hnin | 12 September 2009 (aged 16) | | | (Myanmar Football Federation) Young Lionesses |
| 16 | FW | L L Sai Hwal Nan | 3 February 2009 (aged 17) | | | (Myanmar Football Federation) Ayeyawady |
| 17 | MF | May Thinzar | 29 June 2009 (aged 16) | | | (Myanmar Football Federation) Young Lionesses |
| 18 | GK | Aye Wathan Toe | 10 January 2010 (aged 16) | | | (Myanmar Football Federation) Young Lionesses |
| 19 | MF | Honey Phoo Wai | 18 April 2010 (aged 16) | | | (Myanmar Football Federation) Young Lionesses |
| 20 | MF | Nang Khaing Zin Myint | 8 February 2009 (aged 17) | | | (Myanmar Football Federation) Ayeyawady |
| 21 | MF | Thet Thet Wai | 8 March 2011 (aged 15) | | | (Myanmar Football Federation) Young Lionesses |
| 22 | GK | Kyawt Kay Khine | 11 October 2010 (aged 15) | | | (Myanmar Football Federation) Young Lionesses |
| 23 | FW | Ingyin May | 18 May 2010 (aged 15) | | | (Myanmar Football Federation) Young Lionesses |

== Group B ==
=== Australia ===
Head coach: Michael Cooper

Australia announced their final squad.

| No. | Pos. | Player | Date of birth (age) | Caps | Goals | Club |
|---|---|---|---|---|---|---|
| 1 | GK | Annabelle Croll | 7 July 2009 (aged 16) | | | (Football Australia) Western Sydney Wanderers |
| 2 | DF | Willa Pearson | 24 December 2010 (aged 15) | | | (Football Australia) Sydney FC |
| 3 | DF | Charlotte Bradshaw | 17 April 2009 (aged 17) | | | (Football Australia) Western Sydney Wanderers |
| 4 | MF | Keira Sarris | 24 September 2009 (aged 16) | | | (Football Australia) Melbourne City |
| 5 | DF | Liana Luong | 5 January 2009 (aged 17) | | | (Football Australia) Macarthur Rams FC |
| 6 | MF | Frideriki Karaberis | 7 March 2011 (aged 15) | | | (Football Australia) Western Sydney Wanderers |
| 7 | MF | Claire Corbett | 18 February 2010 (aged 16) | | | (Football Australia) Sydney FC |
| 8 | FW | Kaya Jugovic | 23 January 2009 (aged 17) | | | (Football Australia) Melbourne City |
| 9 | FW | Izabella Rako | 26 June 2009 (aged 16) | | | (Football Australia) Melbourne City |
| 10 | FW | Leyla Hussein | 29 March 2009 (aged 17) | | | (Football Australia) Melbourne Victory |
| 11 | MF | Matilda Wadewitz | 20 May 2009 (aged 16) | | | (Football Australia) Macarthur Rams FC |
| 12 | GK | Alyse Oppedisano | 26 February 2009 (aged 17) | | | (Football Australia) Sydney FC |
| 13 | MF | Maeve Nicholas | 3 May 2009 (aged 16) | | | (Football Australia) Adelaide United |
| 14 | FW | Jada Taylor | 31 July 2010 (aged 15) | | | (Football Australia) Northern Tigers FC |
| 15 | FW | Tyra Bagiante | 25 September 2009 (aged 16) | | | (Football Australia) Macarthur Rams FC |
| 16 | DF | Tehya Aspland | 7 April 2009 (aged 17) | | | (Football Australia) Canberra Olympic FC |
| 17 | DF | Mary Dal Broi | 5 May 2010 (aged 15) | | | (Football Australia) Western Sydney Wanderers |
| 18 | GK | Dali Gorr Burchmore | 1 March 2010 (aged 16) | | | (Football Australia) Melbourne City |
| 19 | DF | Harper Pell | 6 March 2010 (aged 16) | | | (Football Australia) NWS Spirit FC |
| 20 | DF | Sakura Leong | 25 May 2009 (aged 16) | | | (Football Australia) Football West Academy |
| 21 | FW | Theodora Mouithys | 5 February 2009 (aged 17) | | | (Football Australia) Football West Academy |
| 22 | DF | Hayley Muir | 9 January 2009 (aged 17) | | | (Football Australia) Western Sydney Wanderers |
| 23 | MF | Abbie Puckett | 2 June 2009 (aged 16) | | | (Football Australia) Macarthur Rams FC |

=== Japan ===
Head coach: Etsuko Shirai

Japan announced their final squad.

| No. | Pos. | Player | Date of birth (age) | Caps | Goals | Club |
|---|---|---|---|---|---|---|
| 1 | GK | Mikan Yamanaka | 5 January 2010 (aged 16) | | | (Japan Football Association) Fujieda Junshin High School |
| 2 | DF | Wara Shimizu | 21 February 2009 (aged 17) | | | (Japan Football Association) NSK Sagamihara Due |
| 3 | DF | Anri Ito | 13 March 2010 (aged 16) | | | (Japan Football Association) JFA Academy Fukushima |
| 4 | DF | Rei Kitamura | 1 May 2009 (aged 17) | | | (Japan Football Association) INAC Kobe Leoncina |
| 5 | DF | Misato Maeda | 5 January 2009 (aged 17) | | | (Japan Football Association) Sakuyo Gakuen High School |
| 6 | DF | Misaya Takeda | 21 March 2009 (aged 17) | | | (Japan Football Association) Yanagigaura High School |
| 7 | MF | Rara Higuchi | 11 January 2009 (aged 17) | | | (Japan Football Association) Mynavi Sendai Ladies Youth |
| 8 | MF | Harura Matsushita | 16 November 2009 (aged 16) | | | (Japan Football Association) JFA Academy Fukushima |
| 9 | FW | Yuzuha Ikeda | 1 May 2009 (aged 17) | | | (Japan Football Association) Cerezo Osaka Yanmar Girls U-18 |
| 10 | MF | Arisu Ota | 25 April 2009 (aged 17) | | | (Japan Football Association) INAC Kobe Leoncina |
| 11 | MF | Futaba Noda | 9 April 2009 (aged 17) | | | (Japan Football Association) JFA Academy Fukushima |
| 12 | GK | Ayaka Miyaji | 11 June 2010 (aged 15) | | | (Japan Football Association) INAC Kobe Leoncina |
| 13 | MF | Runa Sumiya | 9 May 2009 (aged 16) | | | (Japan Football Association) JEF United Ichihara Chiba Ladies U-18 |
| 14 | MF | Mei Hanashiro | 23 June 2009 (aged 16) | | | (Japan Football Association) JFA Academy Fukushima |
| 15 | DF | Keiko Kitajima | 26 February 2010 (aged 16) | | | (Japan Football Association) JFA Academy Fukushima |
| 16 | DF | Maho Kubota | 2 January 2009 (aged 17) | | | (Japan Football Association) JEF United Ichihara Chiba Ladies U-18 |
| 17 | MF | Mino Tamamura | 4 September 2009 (aged 16) | | | (Japan Football Association) Cerezo Osaka Yanmar Girls U-18 |
| 18 | MF | Mashiro Yamaji | 31 January 2011 (aged 15) | | | (Japan Football Association) JFA Academy Fukushima |
| 19 | MF | Yumi Hayashi | 11 June 2010 (aged 15) | | | (Japan Football Association) Cerezo Osaka Yanmar Girls U-18 |
| 20 | MF | Nanami Kurita | 24 March 2010 (aged 16) | | | (Japan Football Association) Nippon TV Tokyo Verdy Menina |
| 21 | FW | Asuka Tanaka | 31 May 2010 (aged 15) | | | (Japan Football Association) JFA Academy Fukushima |
| 22 | DF | Akina Masaki | 14 December 2009 (aged 16) | | | (Japan Football Association) Mitsubishi Urawa Reds Ladies Youth |
| 23 | GK | Kou Kadowaki | 10 February 2011 (aged 15) | | | (Japan Football Association) Nippon TV Tokyo Verdy Menina |

=== India ===
Head coach: (Italy) Pamela Conti

India announced their final squad on 2 May 2026.

| No. | Pos. | Player | Date of birth (age) | Caps | Goals | Club |
|---|---|---|---|---|---|---|
| 1 | GK | Munni | 2 April 2010 (aged 16) | | | (All India Football Federation) Indian Arrows |
| 2 | DF | Alena Devi Sarangthem | 20 May 2009 (aged 16) | | | (All India Football Federation) Nita |
| 3 | DF | Taniya Devi Tonambam | 18 May 2010 (aged 15) | | | (All India Football Federation) YWC Thambalkhong |
| 4 | DF | Elizabed Lakra | 16 June 2009 (aged 16) | | | (All India Football Federation) Indian Arrows |
| 5 | DF | Divyani Linda | 1 January 2009 (aged 17) | | | (All India Football Federation) Indian Arrows |
| 6 | MF | Thandamoni Baskey | 9 March 2010 (aged 16) | | | (All India Football Federation) East Bengal |
| 7 | MF | Julan Nongmaithem | 15 February 2011 (aged 15) | | | (All India Football Federation) Indian Arrows |
| 8 | MF | Anushka Kumari | 9 December 2010 (aged 15) | | | (All India Football Federation) Indian Arrows |
| 9 | FW | Pearl Fernandes | 9 June 2009 (aged 16) | | | (All India Football Federation) Sesa |
| 10 | MF | Olivia Chanu Ningthoujam | 2 April 2009 (aged 17) | | | (All India Football Federation) Kickstart |
| 11 | DF | Ritu Badaik | 5 June 2011 (aged 14) | | | (All India Football Federation) Nita |
| 12 | MF | Pritika Barman | 11 March 2010 (aged 16) | | | (All India Football Federation) Free agent |
| 13 | GK | Tamphasana Devi Konjengbam | 14 May 2009 (aged 16) | | | (All India Football Federation) YWC Thambalkhong |
| 14 | FW | Valaina Fernandes | 3 September 2009 (aged 16) | | | (All India Football Federation) Indian Arrows |
| 15 | DF | Joyshini Chanu Huidrom | 17 January 2010 (aged 16) | | | (All India Football Federation) YWC Thambalkhong |
| 16 | MF | Redima Devi Chingkhamayum | 3 March 2011 (aged 15) | | | (All India Football Federation) FC Imphal Manipur |
| 17 | DF | Abhista Basnett | 11 March 2011 (aged 15) | | | (All India Football Federation) Indian Arrows |
| 18 | FW | Alva Devi Senjam | 12 November 2010 (aged 15) | | | (All India Football Federation) YWC Thambalkhong |
| 19 | DF | Alisha Lyngdoh | 23 November 2009 (aged 16) | | | (All India Football Federation) Indian Arrows |
| 20 | FW | Anwita Raghuraman | 17 January 2010 (aged 16) | | | (All India Football Federation) Kemp |
| 21 | FW | Joya | 20 February 2011 (aged 15) | | | (All India Football Federation) Free agent |
| 22 | MF | Bonifilia Shullai | 2 February 2010 (aged 16) | | | (All India Football Federation) Garhwal United |
| 23 | GK | Surajmuni Kumari | 12 March 2009 (aged 17) | | | (All India Football Federation) Indian Arrows |

=== Lebanon ===
Head coach: Joseph Mouawad

Lebanon announced their final squad on 21 April 2026.

| No. | Pos. | Player | Date of birth (age) | Caps | Goals | Club |
|---|---|---|---|---|---|---|
| 1 | GK | Marie Joe Chebly | 14 February 2009 (aged 17) | | | (Lebanese Football Association) Eleven Football Pro |
| 2 | DF | Yasmina Nassar | 1 April 2011 (aged 15) | | | (Lebanese Football Association) Beirut Football Academy |
| 3 | DF | Christina Chebly | 16 September 2011 (aged 14) | | | (Lebanese Football Association) Eleven Football Pro |
| 4 | DF | Joya Bou Assaf | 15 October 2009 (aged 16) | | | (Lebanese Football Association) Jounieh |
| 5 | DF | Gianna Frangieh | 11 November 2009 (aged 16) | | | (Lebanese Football Association) Beirut Football Academy |
| 6 | MF | Gaelle Abou Malhab | 4 March 2010 (aged 16) | | | (Lebanese Football Association) Beirut Football Academy |
| 7 | DF | Calina Osman | 25 May 2009 (aged 16) | | | (Lebanese Football Association) Beirut Football Academy |
| 8 | MF | Sara Karnib | 19 August 2010 (aged 15) | | | (Football Australia) Western Sydney Wanderers |
| 9 | FW | Sara Issa | 18 February 2009 (aged 17) | | | (Lebanese Football Association) Beirut Football Academy |
| 10 | FW | Yara Geitani | 24 September 2010 (aged 15) | | | (Lebanese Football Association) Nejmeh |
| 11 | FW | Yasmin El Habbal | 16 June 2009 (aged 16) | | | (The Football Association) Queens Park Rangers |
| 12 | DF | Yara Abi Fadel | 28 May 2010 (aged 15) | | | (Lebanese Football Association) Beirut Football Academy |
| 13 | MF | Rama Kharroubi | 27 July 2010 (aged 15) | | | (Lebanese Football Association) No Limits |
| 14 | MF | Zahra Asaad | 30 May 2009 (aged 16) | | | (Lebanese Football Association) Jwaya |
| 15 | MF | Layane Kalkas | 26 September 2009 (aged 16) | | | (French Football Federation) Bordeaux |
| 16 | MF | Marita Chebly | 16 September 2011 (aged 14) | | | (Lebanese Football Association) Eleven Football Pro |
| 17 | MF | Anabel Zihenni | 12 January 2009 (aged 17) | | | (United States Soccer Federation) World Class FC |
| 18 | FW | Angy Boustany | 9 September 2010 (aged 15) | | | (Lebanese Football Association) No Limits |
| 19 | FW | Avy Douaihy | 9 September 2009 (aged 16) | | | (Lebanese Football Association) Beirut Football Academy |
| 20 | MF | Esraa Hamzeh | 6 December 2009 (aged 16) | | | (Lebanese Football Association) Nejmeh |
| 21 | MF | Rama Moghrabi | 20 October 2010 (aged 15) | | | (Lebanese Football Association) Nejmeh |
| 22 | GK | Ghinwa Karam | 4 December 2010 (aged 15) | | | (Lebanese Football Association) Beirut Football Academy |
| 23 | GK | Nourhan Rafeh | 25 July 2010 (aged 15) | | | (Lebanese Football Association) Nejmeh |

== Group C ==
=== North Korea ===
Head coach: Ji Yun-nam

North Korea announced their final squad.

| No. | Pos. | Player | Date of birth (age) | Caps | Goals | Club |
|---|---|---|---|---|---|---|
| 1 | GK | Kim Son-gyong | 19 March 2009 (aged 17) | | | (DPR Korea Football Association) 4.25 SC |
| 2 | DF | Kim So-yon | 22 August 2009 (aged 16) | | | (DPR Korea Football Association) 4.25 SC |
| 3 | DF | Pak Kyong-ryong | 15 October 2010 (aged 15) | | | (DPR Korea Football Association) 4.25 SC |
| 4 | DF | Kim Sol-song | 22 April 2010 (aged 16) | | | (DPR Korea Football Association) Naegohyang Women's FC |
| 5 | DF | Ri Pok-rim | 6 February 2009 (aged 17) | | | (DPR Korea Football Association) 4.25 SC |
| 6 | MF | Eh Chong-gum | 21 January 2009 (aged 17) | | | (DPR Korea Football Association) Sobaeksu SC |
| 7 | DF | Ri Ui-gyong | 19 July 2009 (aged 16) | | | (DPR Korea Football Association) 4.25 SC |
| 8 | MF | Uh Yon-chong | 25 October 2010 (aged 15) | | | (DPR Korea Football Association) Naegohyang Women's FC |
| 9 | MF | Ri Kyong-im | 26 March 2009 (aged 17) | | | (DPR Korea Football Association) 4.25 SC |
| 10 | FW | Yu Jong-hyang | 18 August 2009 (aged 16) | | | (DPR Korea Football Association) 4.25 SC |
| 11 | FW | So Ye-rim | 22 January 2009 (aged 17) | | | (DPR Korea Football Association) Amrokgang SC |
| 12 | MF | Won Sol-gyong | 23 February 2009 (aged 17) | | | (DPR Korea Football Association) Sobaeksu SC |
| 13 | DF | Ri Hyo-yang | 20 February 2009 (aged 17) | | | (DPR Korea Football Association) 4.25 SC |
| 14 | DF | Pak Mi-song | 20 April 2009 (aged 17) | | | (DPR Korea Football Association) Naegohyang Women's FC |
| 15 | FW | Kim Won-sim | 13 May 2010 (aged 15) | | | (DPR Korea Football Association) Pyongyang International Football School |
| 16 | MF | Ri Yu-song | 2 January 2009 (aged 17) | | | (DPR Korea Football Association) 4.25 SC |
| 17 | FW | Ri Ye-rim | 26 December 2010 (aged 15) | | | (DPR Korea Football Association) 4.25 SC |
| 18 | GK | Ri Su-jong | 25 January 2010 (aged 16) | | | (DPR Korea Football Association) Naegohyang Women's FC |
| 19 | DF | Jo Ryong-yong | 19 February 2009 (aged 17) | | | (DPR Korea Football Association) 4.25 SC |
| 20 | MF | Kim Ju-gyong | 9 January 2010 (aged 16) | | | (DPR Korea Football Association) Amrokgang SC |
| 21 | GK | Hong Ryu-mi | 2 June 2009 (aged 16) | | | (DPR Korea Football Association) Sobaeksu SC |
| 22 | MF | Jo Kum-yong | 18 February 2009 (aged 17) | | | (DPR Korea Football Association) Naegohyang Women's FC |
| 23 | MF | Song Won-yong | 7 January 2010 (aged 16) | | | (DPR Korea Football Association) Pyongyang International Football School |

=== South Korea ===
Head coach: Lee Dayoung

South Korea announced their final squad on 1 May 2026.

| No. | Pos. | Player | Date of birth (age) | Caps | Goals | Club |
|---|---|---|---|---|---|---|
| 1 | GK | Ki Ppeum-ppeum | 20 March 2009 (aged 17) | | | (Korea Football Association) Yesung Girls' High School |
| 2 | DF | Kim Jieun | 18 October 2009 (aged 16) | | | (Korea Football Association) Pohang Girls' Electronic High School |
| 3 | DF | Koo Seyoung | 21 April 2009 (aged 17) | | | (Korea Football Association) Ulsan Hyundai High School |
| 4 | DF | Choo Jiyeon | 9 September 2009 (aged 16) | | | (Korea Football Association) Ulsan Hyundai High School |
| 5 | DF | Jeon Ahhyun | 20 August 2010 (aged 15) | | | (Korea Football Association) Ulsan Hyundai High School |
| 6 | MF | Choi Seeun | 16 January 2009 (aged 17) | | | (Korea Football Association) Kyungnam Robot High School |
| 7 | MF | Kim Heena | 1 August 2009 (aged 16) | | | (Korea Football Association) Ulsan Hyundai High School |
| 8 | MF | Han Gukhee | 21 August 2009 (aged 16) | | | (Korea Football Association) Pohang Girls' Electronic High School |
| 9 | FW | Cho An | 28 April 2010 (aged 16) | | | (Korea Football Association) Ulsan Hyundai High School |
| 10 | FW | Kim Minseo | 24 August 2009 (aged 16) | | | (Korea Football Association) Ulsan Hyundai High School |
| 11 | MF | Baek Seoyeong | 16 May 2009 (aged 16) | | | (Korea Football Association) Kyungnam Robot High School |
| 12 | GK | Ko Haeun | 1 January 2010 (aged 16) | | | (Korea Football Association) Kyungnam Robot High School |
| 13 | DF | Woo Seoyeon | 3 April 2010 (aged 16) | | | (Korea Football Association) Kyungnam Robot High School |
| 14 | MF | Jang Yejin | 15 February 2009 (aged 17) | | | (Korea Football Association) Ulsan Hyundai High School |
| 15 | MF | Jang Hanna | 5 May 2009 (aged 16) | | | (Korea Football Association) Gwangyang Girls' High School |
| 16 | DF | Park Nayoung | 15 June 2010 (aged 15) | | | (Korea Football Association) Ulsan Hyundai High School |
| 17 | DF | Kang Gyueun | 7 June 2010 (aged 15) | | | (Korea Football Association) Ulsan Hyundai High School |
| 18 | GK | Lee Seunga | 12 December 2010 (aged 15) | | | (Korea Football Association) Ulsan Hyundai High School |
| 19 | MF | Kwon Hyori | 20 November 2010 (aged 15) | | | (Korea Football Association) Kyungnam Robot High School |
| 20 | FW | Kim Hee-jin | 5 May 2010 (aged 15) | | | (Korea Football Association) Ulsan Hyundai High School |
| 21 | MF | Kang Jiyun | 2 February 2010 (aged 16) | | | (Korea Football Association) Kyungnam Robot High School |
| 22 | MF | Ko Jieun | 8 December 2010 (aged 15) | | | (Korea Football Association) Ulsan Hyundai High School |
| 23 | FW | Lim Jihye | 2 May 2011 (aged 15) | | | (Korea Football Association) Hyundai Chungun Middle School |

=== Chinese Taipei ===
Head coach: Cheng Ya-hsun

Chinese Taipei announced their final squad on 2 May 2026.

| No. | Pos. | Player | Date of birth (age) | Caps | Goals | Club |
|---|---|---|---|---|---|---|
| 1 | GK | Lin Pin-yu | 1 June 2009 (aged 16) | | | (Chinese Taipei Football Association) Hualien County Sports Senior High School |
| 2 | DF | Wu Yen-yu | 3 April 2009 (aged 17) | | | (Chinese Taipei Football Association) Chung Shan School Foundation |
| 3 | DF | Yang Yu-qing | 17 November 2009 (aged 16) | | | (Chinese Taipei Football Association) Hualien County Sports Senior High School |
| 4 | DF | Chen Ying-xuan | 27 July 2009 (aged 16) | | | (Chinese Taipei Football Association) Hsing Wu Senior High School |
| 5 | DF | Chen Xin-yi | 26 December 2009 (aged 16) | | | (Chinese Taipei Football Association) Yongqing Senior High School |
| 6 | DF | Lu Cai-xuan | 11 September 2010 (aged 15) | | | (Chinese Taipei Football Association) Wuquan Junior High School |
| 7 | MF | Wang Yu-hsin | 27 November 2009 (aged 16) | | | Unattached |
| 8 | MF | Hsiao Yu-chien | 23 November 2010 (aged 15) | | | (Chinese Taipei Football Association) Ziqiang Junior High School |
| 9 | FW | Wu Cai-xuan | 13 September 2009 (aged 16) | | | (United States Soccer Federation) James B. Conant High School |
| 10 | FW | Chung Yun-chien | 15 July 2010 (aged 15) | | | (Chinese Taipei Football Association) Hualien County Sports Senior High School |
| 11 | FW | Chang Yu-hsin | 15 February 2011 (aged 15) | | | (Chinese Taipei Football Association) Hsing Wu Senior High School |
| 12 | MF | Yang Yi-ai | 3 September 2010 (aged 15) | | | (Chinese Taipei Football Association) Wuquan Junior High School |
| 13 | FW | Pan Ya-ni | 27 February 2009 (aged 17) | | | (Chinese Taipei Football Association) Hualien County Sports Senior High School |
| 14 | FW | Hsiao Yu-hui | 23 November 2010 (aged 15) | | | (Chinese Taipei Football Association) Ziqiang Junior High School |
| 15 | FW | Chen Pin-yen | 9 October 2009 (aged 16) | | | (Chinese Taipei Football Association) Huiwen Senior High School |
| 16 | FW | Chen Jing-yun | 9 May 2010 (aged 15) | | | (Chinese Taipei Football Association) Hualien County Sports Senior High School |
| 17 | MF | Lin Ya-cheng | 13 October 2011 (aged 14) | | | (Chinese Taipei Football Association) Ziqiang Junior High School |
| 18 | GK | Lai Yi-jen | 27 September 2009 (aged 16) | | | (Japan Football Association) Hyosung International High School |
| 19 | FW | Chen You-yu | 22 December 2011 (aged 14) | | | (Chinese Taipei Football Association) Wuquan Junior High School |
| 20 | MF | Lin Zi-xuan | 21 April 2009 (aged 17) | | | (Chinese Taipei Football Association) Hualien County Sports Senior High School |
| 21 | MF | Chuang Yung-hsin | 27 September 2009 (aged 16) | | | (Chinese Taipei Football Association) Attaker |
| 22 | DF | Serena Ho | 19 July 2011 (aged 14) | | | (Chinese Taipei Football Association) Taipei American School |
| 23 | GK | Peng Hsiang-chin | 18 September 2009 (aged 16) | | | (Chinese Taipei Football Association) Hualien County Sports Senior High School |

=== Philippines ===
Head coach: (Argentina) Nahuel Arrarte

The Philippines announced their final squad on 30 April 2026.

| No. | Pos. | Player | Date of birth (age) | Caps | Goals | Club |
|---|---|---|---|---|---|---|
| 1 | GK | Leah Bradley | 7 April 2009 (aged 17) | | | (United States Soccer Federation) Eugene Ashley High School |
| 2 | DF | Brooklin Gleason | 27 May 2010 (aged 15) | | | (United States Soccer Federation) Classical Academy High School |
| 3 | DF | Maeva Javier | 10 October 2010 (aged 15) | | | (Philippine Football Federation) Makati FC |
| 4 | DF | Khloe Rivera | 23 August 2010 (aged 15) | | | (United States Soccer Federation) Valley Christian High School |
| 5 | DF | Yurika Valdevieso | 27 July 2009 (aged 16) | | | (Philippine Football Federation) Tuloy FC |
| 6 | DF | Kaida Mizzo | 16 February 2009 (aged 17) | | | (United States Soccer Federation) The Potomac School |
| 7 | MF | Alyssa Cromwell | 23 June 2009 (aged 16) | | | (United States Soccer Federation) Kentwood High School |
| 8 | MF | Addison Subala | 21 January 2010 (aged 16) | | | (United States Soccer Federation) Pioneer High School |
| 9 | FW | Chiara Mizzo | 16 February 2009 (aged 17) | | | (United States Soccer Federation) The Potomac School |
| 10 | MF | Luna Rivera | 10 December 2009 (aged 16) | | | (Canadian Soccer Association) Surrey United Soccer Club |
| 11 | FW | Sachiko Davis | 13 April 2010 (aged 16) | | | (United States Soccer Federation) Tahoma High School |
| 12 | FW | Ariana Enderes | 10 April 2010 (aged 16) | | | (United States Soccer Federation) Acellus Academy |
| 13 | DF | Zada Goslee | 10 August 2009 (aged 16) | | | (United States Soccer Federation) LaGuardia High School |
| 14 | DF | Zayla Lintag | 31 August 2009 (aged 16) | | | (United States Soccer Federation) Elite Academic Academy |
| 15 | FW | Ava Garcia | 29 June 2009 (aged 16) | | | (United States Soccer Federation) Washington High School |
| 16 | DF | Bethany Kingsbury | 27 May 2009 (aged 16) | | | (United States Soccer Federation) Mountain View High School |
| 17 | DF | Aiselyn Sia | 23 February 2009 (aged 17) | | | (United States Soccer Federation) Audeo Valley Charter School |
| 18 | GK | Ava Strauss | 14 October 2009 (aged 16) | | | (Canadian Soccer Association) Semiahmoo Secondary School |
| 19 | FW | Maya Penetrante | 10 February 2009 (aged 17) | | | (United States Soccer Federation) St. Paul VI Catholic High School |
| 20 | FW | Quinn Kellogg | 17 December 2009 (aged 16) | | | (United States Soccer Federation) Del Oro High School |
| 21 | MF | Savannah Chheng | 16 October 2011 (aged 14) | | | (United States Soccer Federation) Oak Valley Middle School |
| 22 | GK | Brooke Solis | 29 September 2009 (aged 16) | | | (Philippine Football Federation) Makati FC |
| 23 | FW | Louraine Evangelista | 7 January 2009 (aged 17) | | | (Philippine Football Federation) Tuloy FC |
