= Naïma Laouadi =

Algerian football player and manager (born 1976)

Personal information
- Date of birth: 15 February 1976 (age 50)
- Place of birth: Tizi Ouzou, Algeria
- Position: Midfielder

Senior career*
Years	Team	Apps	(Gls)
2000–2002	Evreux		
2002–2006	Celtic Marseille	96	(18)

International career
1998–2006	Algeria	45	(17)

Managerial career
- 2017: Algeria Women U17
- 2023–: JS Kabylie
- * Club domestic league appearances and goals

Naïma Laouadi (Arabic: نعمة لعوادي; born 15 February 1976) is an Algerian football former player and current manager. She played as a midfielder and has been a member of the Algeria women's national team. As a player, she operated predominantly as a midfielder, featuring for French clubs such as Évreux and Celtic de Marseille.

She also served her country on the pitch, representing the Algeria women's national team during her active years. After retiring from playing, she moved into coaching and leadership roles in Algerian women's football. On 9 October 2023, JS Kabylie announced that Naïma Laouadi would head its newly-formed women's department, taking charge of the development of the female teams and talent identification across the Tizi Ouzou region.

She helped build structures for women's football during a time when they had limited support.

== Club career ==
Laouadi has played for Évreux AC and Celtic de Marseille in France.

== International career ==
Laouadi capped for Algeria at senior level during two Africa Women Cup of Nations editions (2004 and 2006).
