= Ferial Daoui =

Algerian footballer (born 1999)

Personal information
- Date of birth: 15 December 1999 (age 26)
- Place of birth: Constantine, Algeria
- Position: Forward

Team information
- Current team: Al-Amal
- Number: 7

Youth career
- –2019: FC Constantine

Senior career*
Years	Team	Apps	(Gls)
2019–2023	CS Constantine		
2023–2024	Al-Amal	15	(5)

International career^{‡}
2015–2016	Algeria U17	4	(1)
2019–2020	Algeria U20	3	(0)
2019	Algeria	5	(1)
- * Club domestic league appearances and goals as of 7 March 2024 ‡ National team caps and goals as of 7 April 2024

Ferial Daoui (Arabic: فريال ضاوي; born 15 December 1999) is an Algerian professional footballer who plays as a forward for Saudi Women's Premier League club Al-Amal and the Algeria national team.

She is also known as Ferial Marzouq Al Arabi Daoui in Saudi Arabia where the patronymic name is commonly used for Arabs (where the father's name is Marzouq, the grandfather name is Al Arabi and the family name is Daoui).

== Club career ==
Daoui kicked off her football journey with her hometown club, FC Constantine (Arabic: فتيات وئام قسنطينة), progressing through the youth system to the senior team. In 2019, she was integrated into the senior team. She was named Algerian women's footballer of the year in 2022.

In 2023, after Coach Fertoul was appointed to lead the Saudi team Al-Amal, Daoui was recruited by the club for a one-season contract. helping the club in achieving promotion for the first time in its history.

== International career ==
=== Youth ===
Daoui is a former Algerian youth international having represented the youth selection teams in the Under-17 and Under-20 age groups. She was part of the Algerian squad for the 2015 Arab U-17 Women's Cup. She represent the under-20 team in the 2019 African Games.

=== Senior ===
Daoui made the final squad for the 2020 UNAF Women's Tournament. during which she scored her first international goal against Mauritania. One year later, she was selected to represent Algeria in the 2021 Arab Women's Cup.

== Career statistics ==
=== International ===
As of match played 8 August 2023

Appearances and goals by national team and year
National team	Year	Apps	Goals
Algeria
Algeria	2020	3	1
Algeria	2021	2	0
Total		5	1

Scores and results list France's goal tally first, score column indicates score after each Daoui goal.

List of international goals scored by Ferial Daoui
No.	Date	Venue	Opponent	Score	Result	Competition
1	18 February 2020	El Kram Stadium, El Kram, Tunisia	Mauritania	2–0	5–0	2020 UNAF Women's Tournament
