= 2015 Arab U-17 Women's Cup =

Women's football competition

كأس العرب للفتيات تحت 17 سنة 2015

Tournament details
- Host country: Qatar
- Dates: 15 – 23 February
- Teams: 6 (from 2 confederations)
- Venues: 2 (in 1 host city)

Final positions
- Champions: Lebanon (1st title)
- Runners-up: Djibouti
- Third place: Palestine
- Fourth place: Algeria

Tournament statistics
- Matches played: 10
- Goals scored: 32 (3.2 per match)
- Top scorer: (Palestine) Rozine Nidal (8 goals)

The 2015 Arab Under 17 Women's Cup (Arabic: كأس العرب للفتيات تحت 17 سنة 2015) is the 1st edition of the Arab U-17 Women's Cup for national women's football teams for under 17 affiliated with the Union of Arab Football Associations (UAFA). The tournament was hosted by Qatar between 15 and 23 February 2015. The winner was Lebanon team, marked for the first time Lebanon won a major tournament.

== Participating teams ==
- Algeria
- Djibouti
- Iraq
- Lebanon
- Palestine
- Qatar (hosts)

== Venues ==
Doha	2015 Arab U-17 Women's Cup is located in Qatar
Suheim Bin Hamad Stadium	2015 Arab U-17 Women's Cup is located in Qatar
Capacity: 15,000	2015 Arab U-17 Women's Cup is located in Qatar
Doha	2015 Arab U-17 Women's Cup is located in Qatar
Grand Hamad Stadium	2015 Arab U-17 Women's Cup is located in Qatar
Capacity: 13,000	2015 Arab U-17 Women's Cup is located in Qatar

== Match officials ==
The following referees were chosen for the 2015 Africa Cup of Nations.

Referees

- (Egypt) Sarah Samir Mohammed
- (Lebanon) Huda Al-Awadhi
- (Morocco) Insaf Harkaoui
- (Tunisia) Mounia Badawi
- (Tunisia) Dorsaf Kenwati
- (United Arab Emirates) Rana Rabie Al-Mesmary

Assistant referees

- (Egypt) Hanadi Hasan Mahmoud
- (Egypt) Muna Mahmoud Atallah
- (Morocco) Zohra Jalal
- (Morocco) Karima Khadri
- (Morocco) Souad Oulhaj
- (Tunisia) Amel Hachad

== Group stage ==
=== Group A ===
Team	Pld	W	D	L	GF	GA	GD	Pts
Lebanon	2	1	1	0	9	2	+7	4
Djibouti	2	1	1	0	6	2	+4	4
Qatar	2	0	0	2	0	11	−11	0

15 February 2015
16:45

Qatar	0–4	Djibouti
		Ali 9'; Fouad 24', 70', 74'

Grand Hamad Stadium, Doha

17 February 2015
16:45

Djibouti	2–2	Lebanon
Abdulrahmane 68'; Fouad 88'		Al Jurdi 7' (pen.); Matar Hosry 55'

Grand Hamad Stadium, Doha
Referee: Dorsaf Kenwati (Tunisia)

19 February 2015
16:45

Lebanon	7–0	Qatar
Ghalaini 7', 26', 32'; Chehab 11', 51'; Cherfane 63' (pen.); Al Jurdi 74'

Grand Hamad Stadium, Doha

=== Group B ===
Team	Pld	W	D	L	GF	GA	GD	Pts
Palestine	2	2	0	0	9	2	+7	6
Algeria	2	1	0	1	8	3	+5	3
Iraq	2	0	0	2	0	12	−12	0

15 February 2015
19:15

Algeria	6–0	Iraq
Djernine 1'; Ourbah 45'; Daoui 48'; Chemain 75', 90'; Moudjer 82'

Grand Hamad Stadium, Doha

17 February 2015
19:15

Iraq	0–6	Palestine
		Nidal 20', 57', 74', 82'; Samih 46'; Abid 90'

Grand Hamad Stadium, Doha
Referee: Sarah Samir (Egypt)

19 February 2015
19:15

Palestine	3–2	Algeria
Nidal 7', 88'; Abid 49'		Moudjer 39'; Achoub 51'

Grand Hamad Stadium, Doha

== Knockout phase ==
The semi-final winners proceed to the final and those who lost compete in the third place playoff.

Semi-finals
21 February - Doha
Lebanon	1
Algeria	0
21 February - Doha
Palestine	0
Djibouti	1

Final
23 February - Doha
Lebanon	1
Djibouti	0
Third place
23 February - Doha
Algeria	0
Palestine	3

=== Semi-finals ===
21 February 2015
16:45

Lebanon	1–0	Algeria
Al Jurdi 8' (pen.)

Grand Hamad Stadium, Doha

21 February 2015
19:15

Palestine	0–1	Djibouti
		Abdulrahmane 69'

Grand Hamad Stadium, Doha

=== Third place match ===
23 February 2015
16:45

Algeria	0–3	Palestine
		Nidal 26', 90'; Abid 72'

Suheim Bin Hamad Stadium, Doha

=== Final ===
23 February 2015
19:15

Lebanon	1–0	Djibouti
Tamim 5'

Suheim Bin Hamad Stadium, Doha
Referee: Dorsaf Kenwati (Tunisia)

== Statistics ==
=== Goalscorers ===
8 goals

- (Palestine) Rozine Nidal

4 goals

- (Djibouti) Mazer Fouad

3 goals

- (Lebanon) Hala Ghalaini
- (Lebanon) Aya Al Jurdi
- (Palestine) Ahlem Abid

2 goals

- (Algeria) Nihad Moudjer
- (Djibouti) Kafia Abdulrahmane
- (Lebanon) Mariam Chehab

1 goal

- (Algeria) Bouchra Achoub
- (Algeria) Amira Chemain
- (Algeria) Ferial Daoui
- (Algeria) Mélissa Djernine
- (Algeria) Kahina Ourbah
- (Djibouti) Fatima Ali
- (Lebanon) Yara Matar Hosry
- (Lebanon) Hanin Tamim
- (Lebanon) Gabrielle Cherfane
- (Palestine) Bahia Samih

=== Team statistics ===
Pos.	Team	Pld	W	D	L	Pts	GF	GA	GD
1	Lebanon	4	3	1	0	10	11	2	+9
2	Djibouti	4	2	1	1	7	7	3	+4
3	Palestine	4	3	0	1	9	12	3	+9
4	Algeria	4	1	0	3	3	8	7	+1
**Eliminated in the group stage**
5	Qatar	2	0	0	2	0	0	11	−11
6	Iraq	2	0	0	2	0	0	12	−12
Total									

Updated to games played on 21 February 2015. Team(s) rendered in italics represent(s) the host nation(s). The competition's winning team is rendered in bold.
