= Lili Iskandar =

Lebanese footballer (born 2002)

- Iskandar with Lebanon in 2025

Personal information
- Full name: Layla Pascal Iskandar
- Date of birth: 16 May 2002 (age 24)
- Place of birth: Zgharta, Lebanon
- Height: 1.72 m (5 ft 8 in)
- Position: Forward

Team information
- Current team: Omonia
- Number: 9

Youth career
- Salam Zgharta

Senior career*
Years	Team	Apps	(Gls)
2017–2019	Salam Zgharta		(26)
2019–2021	SAS		(15)
2021–2022	HB Køge	0	(0)
2022–2024	Etihad	24	(19)
2023–2024	→ Al-Ittihad (loan)	13	(4)
2024–2025	Al-Ittihad	18	(6)
2025–2026	Guingamp	18	(2)
2026–	Omonia	6	(8)

International career^{‡}
2018–2019	Lebanon U18	7	(7)
2019–2020	Lebanon U19	6	(3)
2018–	Lebanon	39	(17)
Medal record
Women's football
Representing Lebanon
WAFF Women's Championship
Silver medal – second place	2022
Bronze medal – third place	2019
WAFF U-18 Girls Championship
Gold medal – first place	2019	U-18 Team
- * Club domestic league appearances and goals as of 22 November 2026 ‡ National team caps and goals as of 13 October 2026

Layla Pascal "Lili" Iskandar (Arabic: ليلى باسكال "ليلي" إسكندر; born 16 May 2002) is a Lebanese footballer who plays as a forward for Cypriot club Omonia and the Lebanon national team.

Starting out at Salam Zgharta in 2016–17, Iskandar moved to reigning champions SAS. In her only season at the club (2019–20), she helped SAS lift their fifth league title, scoring 15 goals in the process. Iskandar joined Danish side HB Køge for the 2021–22 season. In 2022 she moved to Etihad in Jordan, winning the 2023 league title as top goalscorer (14 goals). In 2023, Iskandar joined Saudi club Al-Ittihad, where she remained for two seasons. She moved to France in 2025, playing for Guingamp.

Iskandar represented Lebanon at the youth level, winning the 2019 WAFF U-18 Girls Championship as the competition's top scorer. Iskandar has also played at senior level since 2018. She helped Lebanon finish runners-up at the WAFF Women's Championship in 2022 as the competition's best player, and in third place in 2019.

== Early life ==
Iskandar began playing football with her brothers and friends aged eight, in her hometown of Zgharta, North Governorate, Lebanon. She joined local club Salam Zgharta's youth sector, initially playing with the boys' team as there was no dedicated girls' age-group team. After three years of playing in the boys' team, Iskandar convinced girls from her hometown to join Salam, which prompted the club to form a girls' team.

== Club career ==
=== Lebanon ===
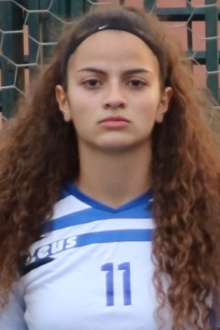
Iskandar with SAS in 2020

Iskandar made her senior debut for hometown club Salam Zgharta, scoring 29 league goals between 2016–17 and 2018–19.

In 2019 she moved to reigning champions SAS. In the final matchday of the season, Iskandar scored a brace against EFP to help her side win the 2019–20 league title. She ended the season with 15 goals, scoring at a rate of more than one goal per game.

=== HB Køge ===
On 9 July 2021, Iskandar joined HB Køge ahead of the 2021–22 Danish Women's League on a one-year contract.

=== Etihad ===
On 3 July 2022, Iskandar moved to Jordan Women's Pro League club Etihad. She cited reuniting with former Lebanon national team coach Wael Gharzeddine as the main reason for joining the club. Iskandar scored her first goal on 17 July, helping Etihad beat Al-Nasser 3–0 in the league. She finished the 2022 season with five goals in 12 games, helping her side finish runners-up in the league and the cup.

On 2 September 2023, Iskandar led Ettihad to win the 2023 Jordanian-Saudi Women's Clubs Championship as top scorer with four goals. She finished the 2023 season as the league's top scorer with 14 goals in 12 games, helping Etihad win their first league title.

=== Al-Ittihad ===
In October 2023, Iskandar joined Al-Ittihad during the 2023–24 Saudi Women's Premier League on loan until the end of the season. She finished the season with seven goals and one assist in 17 games in all competitions. In July 2024, Al-Ittihad signed her on a permanent contract for one year. Iskandar left the club at the end of the 2024–25 season; she played 31 games over two seasons in the Saudi Women's Premier League, scoring 10 goals in the process.

=== Guingamp ===
On 2 October 2025, Iskandar joined Seconde Ligue side Guingamp. She made her debut two days later, on 4 October, starting in a 3–0 defeat to Toulouse. She played 20 games in all competitions throughout the 2025–26 season, scoring twice in the process.

=== Omonia ===
On 2 October 2026, Iskandar signed for Omonia in the Cypriot First Division. She scored a hat-trick on her debut the following day, as a half-time substitute in a 5–1 win over Xylofagou.

== International career ==
=== Youth ===
Iskandar's first international goal came on her debut for the Lebanon under-19 national team, on 24 October 2018, in a 2019 AFC U-19 Championship qualification match against Hong Kong U19. She played four games during the qualifiers, scoring once. Iskandar was the top goalscorer of the 2019 WAFF U-18 Championship, which she won, scoring seven goals in five matches.

In December 2020, Iskandar played two friendly games against Egypt U19, a 3–1 defeat and a 3–2 win, scoring in both games. With her two goals against Egypt, Iskandar became the first player to reach 10 goals for the under-18 and under-19 teams.

=== Senior ===
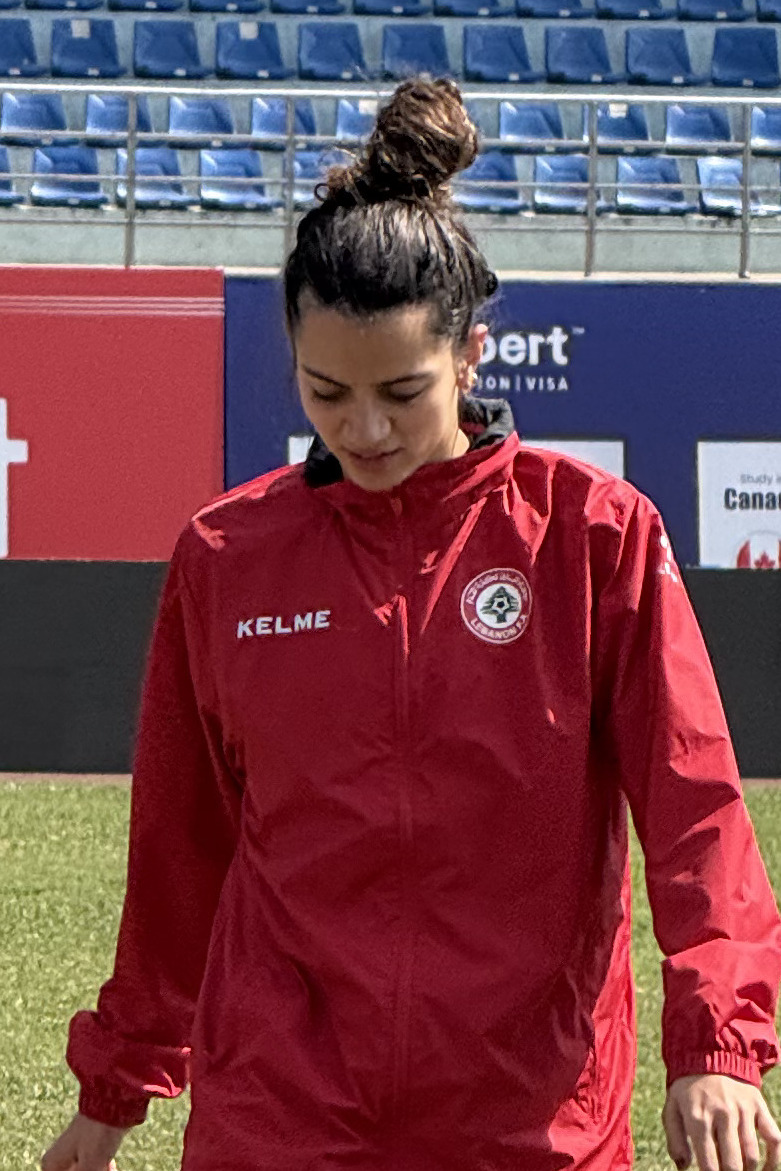
Iskandar training with Lebanon in 2025

Iskandar's senior debut for Lebanon came on 8 November 2018, coming on as a substitute against Iran in a 2020 AFC Olympic qualification match. Iskandar also played four games for Lebanon at the 2019 WAFF Championship, helping her team reach third place.

On 24 October 2021, Iskandar scored her first goal in a 2022 AFC Asian Cup qualification game against Guam, which ended in a 3–0 win. Iskandar took part in the 2022 WAFF Championship; she helped her side finish runners-up as the tournament's best player, scoring one goal against Palestine on 29 August. On 8 April 2023, Iskandar scored her first international brace in a 5–0 win against Indonesia in the 2024 AFC Olympic Qualifying Tournament. On 30 September 2023, Iskandar scored in the 102nd minute of the 2023 SAFF Friendly Tournament final, a 1–0 win against Bhutan. In the process, she broke Christy Maalouf's record of eight international goals for Lebanon.

Iskandar opened the 2024 WAFF Championship with a hat-trick against Guam on 19 February 2024, helping her side win 4–3; she became the first player to score 10 goals for her national team. Iskandar's third goal of the match was also the Lebanon women's national team's 100th of all time. On 16 July 2025, Iskandar provided three assists – all to Christy Maalouf – in a 3–1 win against Iran in the 2026 Asian Cup qualifiers, becoming the first ever player to provide three assists in a single game for Lebanon.

== Style of play ==
An attacking midfielder in her youth, Iskandar transitioned into a versatile forward later in her career. She is noted for her finishing and ability to create attacking chances. Iskandar is 1.72 m (5 ft 8 in) tall and is right-footed.

== Personal life ==
Iskandar speaks three languages: English, French, and Arabic. Her idol is American footballer Alex Morgan, who she described as a "lady on and off the pitch".

== Career statistics ==
=== Club ===
As of match played 22 November 2026

Appearances and goals by club, season and competition
Club	Season	League			National cup (Note: Includes Lebanese Women's FA Cup, Danish Women's Cup, Women's Jordan Cup, Saudi Women's Cup, Coupe de France Féminine)		League cup (Note: Includes Coupe LFFP)		Other		Total	
Club	Season	Division	Apps	Goals	Apps	Goals	Apps	Goals	Apps	Goals	Apps	Goals
Salam Zgharta	2016–17	Lebanese League		6		2	—		—			8
Salam Zgharta	2017–18	Lebanese League		10		1	—		—			11
Salam Zgharta	2018–19	Lebanese League		10	—		—		—			10
Salam Zgharta	Total			26		3	0	0	0	0		29
SAS	2019–20	Lebanese League		15	—		—		—			15
HB Køge	2021–22	Danish League	—		—		—		—		0	0
HB Køge	Total		0	0	0	0	0	0	0	0	0	0
Etihad	2022	Jordan Pro League	12	5	3	0	—		—		15	5
Etihad	2023	Jordan Pro League	12	14	—		—		5 (Note: Appearances in Jordanian-Saudi Women's Clubs Championship)	4	17	18
Etihad	Total		24	19	3	0	0	0	5	4	32	23
Al-Ittihad	2023–24	Saudi Premier League	13	4	4	3	—		—		17	7
Al-Ittihad	2024–25	Saudi Premier League	18	6	1	2	—		—		19	8
Al-Ittihad	Total		31	10	5	5	0	0	0	0	36	15
Guingamp	2025–26	Seconde Ligue	18	2	0	0	2	0	—		20	2
Omonia	2026–27	Cypriot First Division	6	8	1	0	—		—		7	8
Career total			79+	80	9+	8	2	0	5	4	95+	92

=== International ===
Scores and results list Lebanon's goal tally first, score column indicates score after each Iskandar goal.

List of international goals scored by Lili Iskandar
No.	Date	Venue	Opponent	Score	Result	Competition
1	24 October 2021	Dolen Omurzakov Stadium, Bishkek, Kyrgyzstan	Guam	2–0	3–0	2022 AFC Asian Cup qualification
2	29 August 2022	Petra Stadium, Amman, Jordan	Palestine	3–0	3–0	2022 WAFF Championship
3	22 March 2023	Fouad Chehab Stadium, Jounieh, Lebanon	Egypt	1–1	1–2	Friendly
4	8 April 2023	Fouad Chehab Stadium, Jounieh, Lebanon	Indonesia	1–0	5–0	2024 AFC Olympic Qualifying Tournament
5	8 April 2023	Fouad Chehab Stadium, Jounieh, Lebanon	Indonesia	5–0	5–0	2024 AFC Olympic Qualifying Tournament
6	18 July 2023	Ansar Stadium, Ansar, Lebanon	Palestine	3–0	5–0	Friendly
7	18 September 2023	King Fahd Sports City, Taif, Saudi Arabia	Laos	4–0	4–1	2023 SAFF Friendly Tournament
8	21 September 2023	King Fahd Sports City, Taif, Saudi Arabia	Bhutan	1–0	3–2	2023 SAFF Friendly Tournament
9	30 September 2023	King Fahd Sports City, Taif, Saudi Arabia	Bhutan	1–0	1–0	2023 SAFF Friendly Tournament
10	19 February 2024	King Abdullah Sports City Reserve Stadium, Jeddah, Saudi Arabia	Guam	1–2	4–3	2024 WAFF Championship
11	19 February 2024	King Abdullah Sports City Reserve Stadium, Jeddah, Saudi Arabia	Guam	3–3	4–3	2024 WAFF Championship
12	19 February 2024	King Abdullah Sports City Reserve Stadium, Jeddah, Saudi Arabia	Guam	4–3	4–3	2024 WAFF Championship
13	17 February 2025	Dasharath Rangasala, Kathmandu, Nepal	Myanmar	1–1	1–3	2025 Vianet Championship
14	29 May 2025	Champville Stadium, Beirut, Lebanon	Palestine	1–1	1–1	Friendly
15	1 June 2025	Fouad Chehab Stadium, Jounieh, Lebanon	Palestine	2–1	2–1	Friendly
16	19 July 2025	King Abdullah II Stadium, Amman, Jordan	Singapore	1–0	1–0	2026 Asian Cup qualification
17	10 October 2026	Fouad Chehab Stadium, Jounieh, Lebanon	Palestine	1–1	1–1	Friendly

== Honours ==
SAS

- Lebanese Women's Football League: 2019–20

Etihad

- Jordan Women's Pro League: 2023; runner-up: 2022
- Jordanian-Saudi Women's Clubs Championship: 2023
- Jordan Women's Cup runner-up: 2022

Lebanon U18

- WAFF U-18 Girls Championship: 2019

Lebanon

- WAFF Women's Championship runner-up: 2022; third place: 2019

Individual

- Jordan Women's Pro League top scorer: 2023
- Women's Club Championship top scorer: 2023
- WAFF Women's Championship best player: 2022
- WAFF U-18 Girls Championship top goalscorer: 2019

== See also ==
- List of Lebanon women's international footballers
