= Limassol Marathon =

Road running event in Limassol, Cyprus

- Date: usually in March
- Location: Limassol, Cyprus
- Event type: Road
- Distance: Marathon
- Primary sponsor: XM
- Established: 2006
- Course records: Men's: 2:13:29 (2010) (Kenya) Moses Kangogo; Women's: 2:38:56 (2010) (Russia) Natalya Sergeyeva
- Website: Limassol Marathon
- Participants: 17,000 (2024)

The Limassol Marathon is part of an annual European race series which takes place in Limassol, Cyprus. It was first introduced in 2006. The event features a number of races over two days, including a marathon.

The marathon is recognized by the Association of International Marathons and Distance Races and the International Association of Athletics Federations.

== History ==
In 2015, the Marathon attracted more than 10,000 participants from 50 countries, of whom about 15% came from abroad. Runners are mostly European however, participation from Japan, US, Brazil, Australia, China and Turkey is very common. The oldest runner in 2015 was Cypriot Andreas Pampakas, aged 78 with children as young as 5 years old participating as well.

The thirteenth run was held on 23 and 24 of March 2019.

Due to the coronavirus pandemic, the 2020 and 2021 in-person editions of the race were merged into one event scheduled for the weekend of 28 November 2021, with all registrants given both the option of transferring their entry to a future event, as well as the option of also running the race virtually for free. (Note: The 2020 edition had initially been postponed to the weekend of 22 November 2020 before being merged with the 2021 edition.)

== Course ==
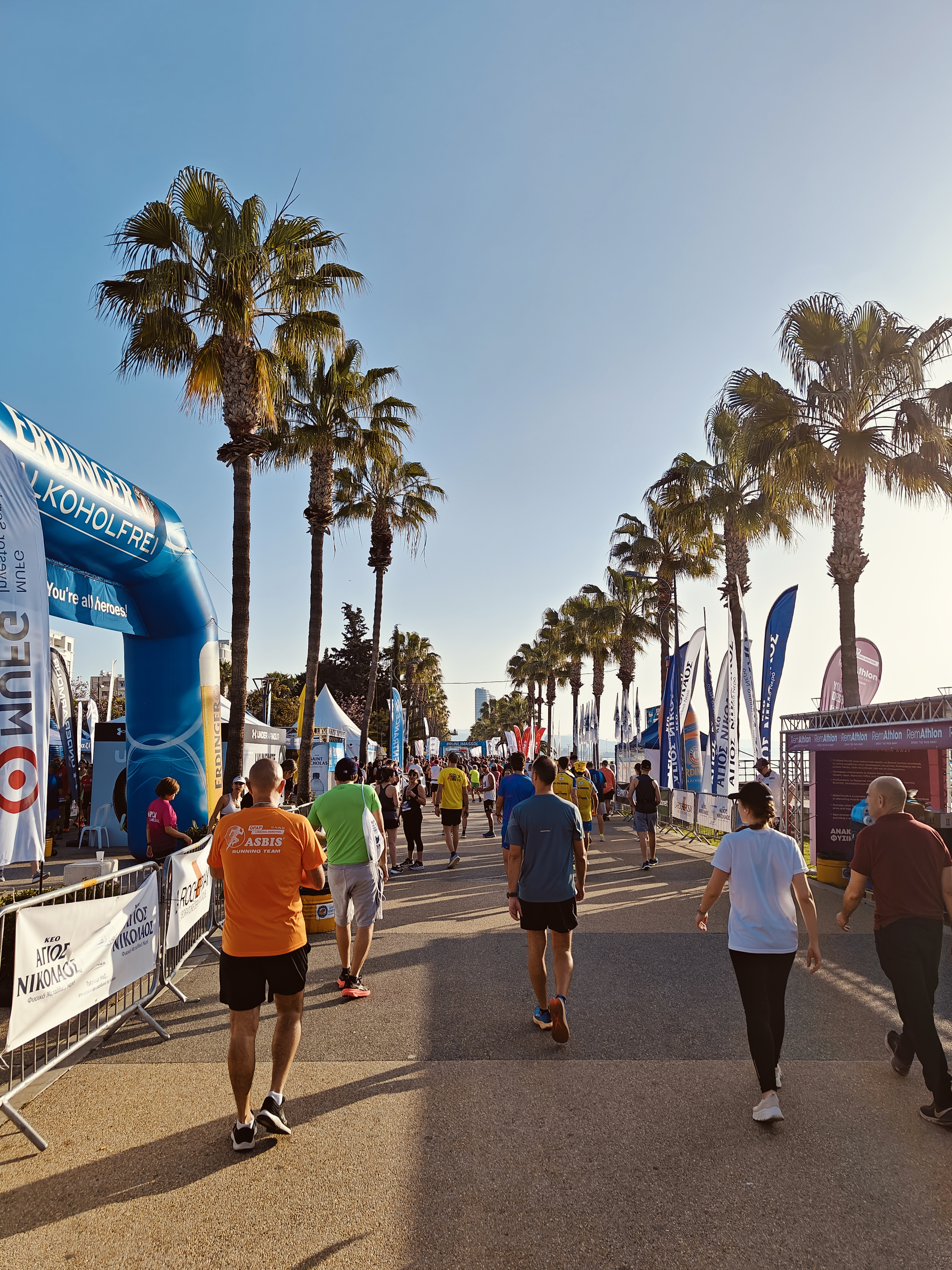
Participants walking to the starting line of the 2024 edition, in Molos area.

The XM Limassol Marathon course is of a low degree of difficulty. The start of the race is at the center of the city on the seafront of the Limassol promenade and follows the Mediterranean coastline along the beachfront, to the ruins of the ancient Royal City of Amathus and back to the city. The athletes head west to the Port of Limassol, passing by the streets “Christodoulou Hadjipavlou” and “Spyrou Araouzou” towards the roundabout at the Limassol Marina. The path continues towards the streets Kioproulouzate, Xelal Bazaar and the Avenue Franklin Roosevelt.

Roads are officially closed to traffic throughout the entire length of the race and medical support is offered along the race course.

== Other races ==
Aside from the marathon, the event also features a half marathon, a 10 km energy Race, a 5 km city race, a 5 km corporate race and a youth race

The full marathon begins 2 hours before the 10K and 5k.

== Management ==
Race Directors
Years	Name	Country
2006–2008	George Karagiannis	Greece
2009–2017	Vasilis Vavalos	Greece
2018– today	Constandinos Kivittis	Cyprus

== Marketing ==
Limassol Marathon official song of the event is called Ladies & Gentlemen (Limassol Marathon Version) it was created in 2014 by the Greek music band S.M.Fusion and was released from the record company Sugar Faktory for the 10th edition of the Limassol Marathon.

In 2016, Argos Animal Sanctuary manager, Andrew Brown run the Marathon by wearing a dog costume in temperatures reaching 22 degrees as a PR stand to attract attention for the animal shelter.

== Winners ==
Key: Course record (in bold)

Ed.	Year	Men's winner	Time	Women's winner	Time	Ref.
	2006	only local runners ran				
	2007	only local runners ran				
	2008	Desta Habtamu (ETH)	2:18:39	Julia Kavvaba (GRE)	3:32:46	
	2009	Jebel Kassahun (ETH)	2:30:45	Alina Istudora (ROU)	2:46:53	
	2010	Moses Kangogo (KEN)	**2:13:29**	Natalya Sergeyeva (RUS)	**2:38:56**	
	2011	Momanyi Basweti (KEN)	2:27:08	Lydia Jerotich (KEN)	2:47:53	
	2012	Jebel Kassahun (ETH)	2:29:32	Yuliya Khazova (RUS)	2:47:32	
	2013	Jebel Kassahun (ETH)	2:27:51	Irina Pankovskaya (RUS)	2:48:35	
8	2014	Wojciech Kopeć (POL)	2:17:22	Cecilia Backman (FIN)	3:21:01	
9	2015	Jebel Kassahun (ETH)	2:46:05	Caroline Jackson (GBR)	3:21:19	
10	2016	Tomasz Klisz (POL)	2:41:47	Sylwia Bondara (POL)	3:12:40	
	2017	Edwin Kiyeng (KEN)	2:15:04	Gladys Biwott (KEN)	2:40:41	
	2018	Simon Kiprugut (KEN)	2:18:28	Olivera Jevtić (SRB)	2:44:26	
	2019	Abel Rop (KEN)	2:17:40	Ruth Matebo (KEN)	2:43:30	
	2020	merged with 2021 edition due to COVID-19 pandemic				
	2022	Egor Vinogradov (RUS)	2:30:36	Adela Paulina Baltoi (ROU)	2:50:35	
	2023	(United Kingdom) Matthew Blunden	2:31:12	(Cyprus) Maria Soteriou	3:05:04	
	2024	(Israel) Yossi Gross	2:46:04	(France) Sophie Poussard	3:29:50	
	2025	(Cyprus) Giorgos Tofi	2:27:50	(Cyprus) Eleni Ioannou	2:54:42	
