= Lebanon women's national under-17 football team =

Association football team

Lebanon under-17
- Nickname(s): ناشئات الأرز (The Junior Cedars)
- Association: Lebanese Football Association (LFA)
- Confederation: AFC (Asia)
- Sub-confederation: WAFF (West Asia)
- Head coach: Joseph Mouawad
- Home stadium: Various
- FIFA code: LBN
First colours	Second colours

First international
- Djibouti 2–2 Lebanon (Doha, Qatar; 17 February 2015)

Biggest win
- Lebanon 9–0 Kuwait (Khobar, Saudi Arabia; 13 October 2025)

Biggest defeat
- Japan 13–0 Lebanon (Suzhou, China; 2 May 2026)

AFC U-17 Women's Asian Cup
- Appearances: 1 (first in 2026)
- Best result: Group stage (2026)

Arab U-17 Women's Cup
- Appearances: 1 (first in 2015)
- Best result: Champions (2015)

WAFF U-17 Women's Championship
- Appearances: 6 (first in 2018)
- Best result: Champions (2019, 2023, 2025)
Medal record
Women's football
Arab U-17 Women's Cup
Gold medal – first place	2015 Qatar
WAFF U-17 Girls Championship
Gold medal – first place	2019 Jordan
Gold medal – first place	2023 Jordan
Gold medal – first place	2025 Saudi Arabia
Silver medal – second place	2018 United Arab Emirates
Silver medal – second place	2026 Jordan
Bronze medal – third place	2023 Jordan

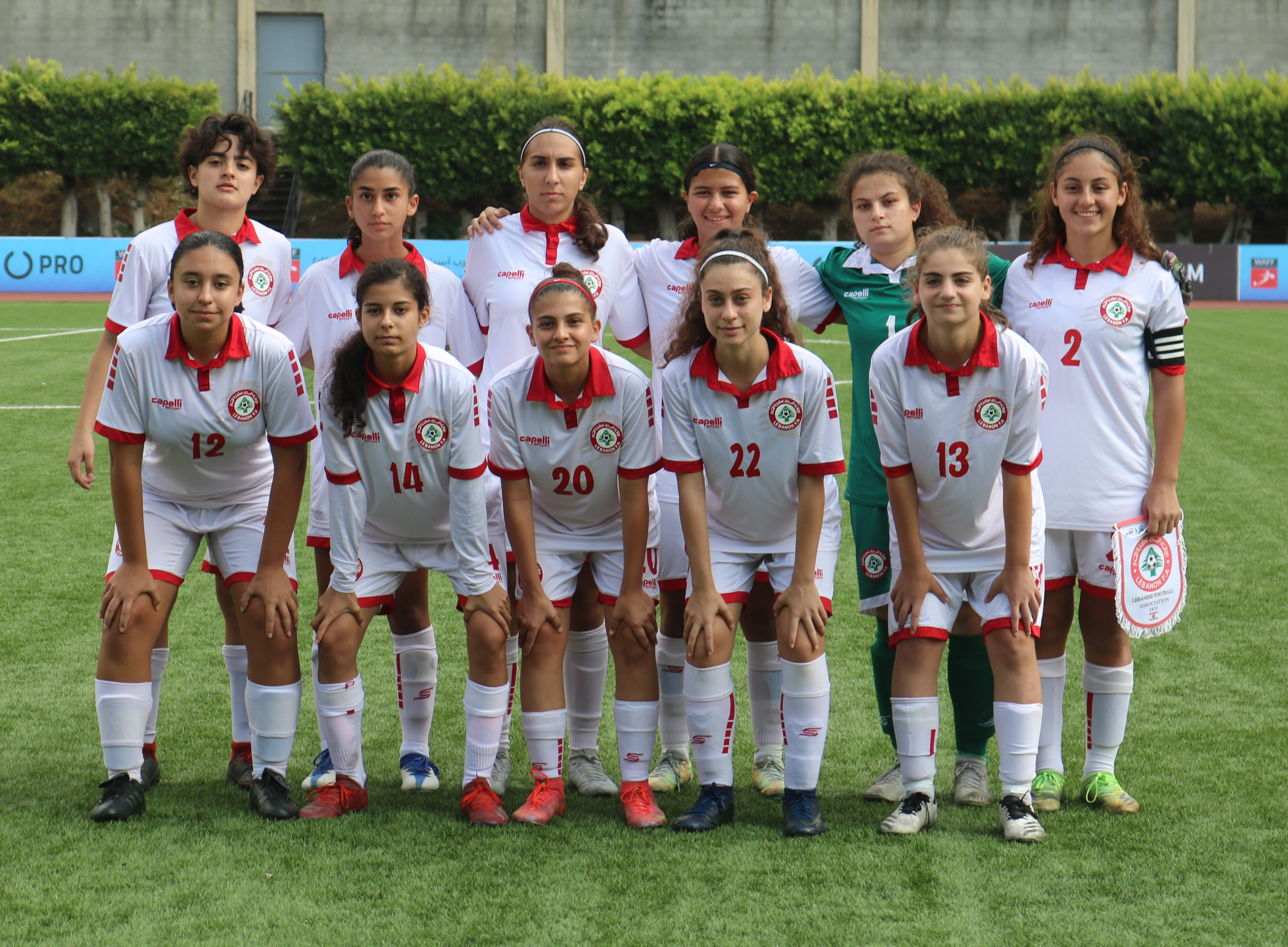
Lebanon U16 at the 2022 WAFF U-18 Girls Championship

The Lebanon women's national under-17 football team (Arabic: منتخب لبنان لكرة القدم تحت 17 سنة للسيدات), colloquially known as "the Junior Cedars" (Arabic: ناشئات الأرز), represents Lebanon in international women's youth football. The team is controlled by the Lebanese Football Association (LFA), the governing body for football in Lebanon. The team also serves as the women's national under-16 and women's national under-15 football team of Lebanon.

While the team has never participated in the FIFA U-17 Women's World Cup, they qualified for the AFC U-17 Women's Asian Cup for the first time in 2026, thus becoming the first Lebanese women's national team to qualify for an Asian Cup tournament. Lebanon have won both the Arab U-17 Women's Cup (in 2015) and the WAFF U-17 Girls Championship (in 2019, 2023, and 2025). Their 2015 Arab Cup victory marked the first official title won by any Lebanese national football team, male or female.

== Competitive record ==
=== FIFA U-17 Women's World Cup ===
FIFA U-17 Women's World Cup record									Qualification record						
Host nation(s) and year	Position	Pld	W	D	L	GF	GA	Squad	Position	Pld	W	D	L	GF	GA
(New Zealand) 2008	did not enter								did not enter						
(Trinidad and Tobago) 2010	did not enter								did not enter						
(Azerbaijan) 2012	did not enter								did not enter						
(Costa Rica) 2014	did not enter								did not enter						
(Jordan) 2016	did not enter								did not enter						
(Uruguay) 2018	did not enter								did not enter						
(India) 2022	did not qualify								The 2019 AFC U-16 Women's Championship served as the qualifying tournament						
(Dominican Republic) 2024	did not qualify								The 2024 AFC U-17 Women's Asian Cup served as the qualifying tournament						
(Morocco) 2025	did not qualify								The 2017, 2019 and 2024 AFC U-17 Women's Asian Cup served as the qualifying tournaments						
(Morocco) 2026	did not qualify								The 2026 AFC U-17 Women's Asian Cup served as the qualifying tournament						
Total	N/A	–	–	–	–	–	–	–	0/10	–	–	–	–	–	–

=== AFC U-17 Women's Asian Cup ===
AFC U-17 Women's Asian Cup record									Qualification record						
Host nation(s) and year	Position	Pld	W	D	L	GF	GA	Squad	Position	Pld	W	D	L	GF	GA
(South Korea) 2005	did not enter								did not enter						
(Malaysia) 2007	did not enter								did not enter						
(Thailand) 2009	did not enter								did not enter						
(China) 2011	did not enter								did not enter						
(China) 2013	did not enter								did not enter						
(China) 2015	did not enter								did not enter						
(Thailand) 2017	withdrew								withdrew						
(Thailand) 2019	did not qualify								3rd of 5	4	2	0	2	14	18
(Indonesia) 2024	did not qualify								2nd of 3	2	1	0	1	5	4
(China) 2026	Group stage	3	0	1	2	1	18	Squad	1st of 4	3	2	1	0	13	2
(China) 2027	did not qualify								2nd of 4	3	2	0	1	11	5
(China) 2028	to be determined								to be determined						
Total	Group stage	3	0	1	2	1	18	–	1/11	12	7	1	4	43	29

=== Arab U-17 Women's Cup ===
Arab U-17 Women's Cup record
Host nation(s) and year	Position	Pld	W	D	L	GF	GA
(Qatar) 2015	Champions	4	3	1	0	11	2
Total	Champions	4	3	1	0	11	2

=== WAFF U-17 Women's Championship ===
WAFF U-17 Women's Championship record
Host nation(s) and year	Position	Pld	W	D	L	GF	GA
(United Arab Emirates) 2018	Runners-up	4	2	1	1	14	6
(Jordan) 2019	Champions	3	3	0	0	13	0
(Jordan) 2023	Champions	4	3	1	0	10	1
(Jordan) 2023	Third place	4	2	1	1	11	3
(Saudi Arabia) 2025	Champions	4	4	0	0	13	0
(Jordan) 2026	Runners-up	5	3	1	1	17	3
Total	Champions	24	17	4	3	78	13

=== Other tournaments ===
Tournament	Position
(Lebanon) 2022 WAFF U-18 Girls Championship (Note: Participated as "Lebanon (B)")	Fourth place

== Results and fixtures ==
The following is a list of match results in the last 12 months, as well as any future matches that have been scheduled.

Win Draw Loss Fixture

=== 2026 ===
2 May 2026 2026 AFC U-17 Asian Cup GS	Japan	13–0	Lebanon	Suzhou, China
15:30 UTC+8	Kubota 3'; Frangieh 25' (o.g.); Higuchi 27', 34', 64'; Sumiya 28'; Ikeda 37'; Ito 42', 67'; Hanashiro 52', 60'; Ota 70'; Kurita 80'	Report		Stadium: Suzhou Taihu Football Sports Centre Pitch 4 Attendance: 100; Referee: Om Choki (Bhutan)

5 May 2026 2026 AFC U-17 Asian Cup GS	Lebanon	1–1	Australia	Suzhou, China
15:30 UTC+8	Karnib 59'	Report	Mouithys 30'	Stadium: Suzhou Taihu Football Sports Centre Pitch 8 Attendance: 157; Referee: Roziyabonu Yusupova (Uzbekistan)

8 May 2026 2026 AFC U-17 Asian Cup GS	India	4–0	Lebanon	Suzhou, China
15:30 UTC+8	Barman 7', 85'; Senjam 36'; Joya 72'	Report		Stadium: Suzhou Taihu Football Sports Centre Pitch 8 Attendance: 37; Referee: Sunita Thongthawin (Thailand)

17 July 2026 2026 WAFF U-17 GS	Lebanon	8–0	United Arab Emirates	Zarqa, Jordan
17:00 UTC+3	Arab 2'; Geitani 10', 16'; A. Hajj 18'; Boustany 39'; D. Hajj 45+1', 56'; Saad 62'	Report; Report (WAFF)		Stadium: Prince Mohammed Stadium

19 July 2026 2026 WAFF U-17 GS	Saudi Arabia	0–2	Lebanon	Zarqa, Jordan
20:00 UTC+3		Report; Report (WAFF)	Boustany 3'; Geitani 23'	Stadium: Prince Mohammed Stadium

21 July 2026 2026 WAFF U-17 GS	Lebanon	0–1	Syria	Zarqa, Jordan
17:00 UTC+3		Report; Report (WAFF)	Jomaa Ato 87'	Stadium: Prince Mohammed Stadium

24 July 2026 2026 WAFF U-17 SF	Jordan	0–5	Lebanon	Zarqa, Jordan
20:00 UTC+3		Report	Geitani 29', 56'; C. Chebly 31'; D. Hajj 60'; Saad 79'	Stadium: Prince Mohammed Stadium

26 July 2026 2026 WAFF U-17 F	Syria	2–2 (4–3 p)	Lebanon	Zarqa, Jordan
18:00 UTC+3	Al-Khelif 69'; Jomaa Ato 90+2'	Report	Geitani 36'; Abou Malhab 40' (pen.)	Stadium: Prince Mohammed Stadium
	Penalties
	Mena (penalty scored); Al-ktaish (penalty scored); Jomaa Ato (penalty scored); Issa (penalty missed); Ebrahim (penalty scored)		(penalty scored) Nassar; (penalty missed) C. Chebly; (penalty scored) Geitani; (penalty scored) Dib; (penalty missed) Abou Malhab

10 September 2026 Friendly	Lebanon	5–0	Iraq	Beirut, Lebanon
20:30 UTC+3	El Hajj 1', 21'; Chebli 36'; El Gitani 45+2'; Boustany 79'	Report		Stadium: Rafic Hariri Stadium

12 September 2026 Friendly	Lebanon	3–2	Iraq	Beirut, Lebanon
20:00 UTC+3	Monzer 27'; Abou Malhab 68'; Nassar 76'	Report	Youssef 46'; Nour El-Din 49'	Stadium: Champville Stadium

5 October 2026 2027 AFC U-17 qualification	Lebanon	6–0	Macau	Chonburi, Thailand
15:00 UTC+7	Geitani 5', 66'; Tong Hoi Lam 40' (o.g.); Karnib 63'; Boustany 80'; Hajj 88'	Report		Stadium: Chonburi Stadium; Referee: Haneen Murad (Jordan)

8 October 2026 2027 AFC U-17 qualification	Bhutan	0–5	Lebanon	Chonburi, Thailand
15:00 UTC+7		Report	Karnib 10', 47'; Geitani 44', 45+2', 50'	Stadium: Chonburi Stadium; Referee: Fatemeh Nasiri Looshani (Iran)

11 October 2026 2027 AFC U-17 qualification	Thailand	5–0	Lebanon	Chonburi, Thailand
19:00 UTC+7	Wanthong 21'; Pawitchayada 34', 45+1'; Murdoch 56'; Nanthiya 65'	Report		Stadium: Chonburi Stadium; Referee: Khin Nyein Chan (Myanmar)

== Players ==
The following 23 players were called up for the 2027 AFC U-17 Women's Asian Cup qualification matches against Macau, Bhutan, and Thailand between 5 and 11 October 2026.

No.	Pos.	Player	Date of birth (age)	Club
1	GK	Ghinwa Karam	4 December 2010 (age 15)	(Lebanese Football Association) BFA
22	GK	Sophia Ayyad	3 December 2012 (age 13)	(Lebanese Football Association) Nejmeh
23	GK	Nourhan Rafeh	25 July 2010 (age 16)	(Lebanese Football Association) Nejmeh
2	DF	Yasmina Nassar	1 April 2011 (age 15)	(Lebanese Football Association) BFA
3	DF	Marita Chebli	16 September 2011 (age 15)	(Lebanese Football Association) Lebanon United
4	DF	Jane Deeb	3 August 2012 (age 14)	(Lebanese Football Association) BFA
5	DF	Yara Abi Fadel	28 May 2010 (age 16)	(Lebanese Football Association) BFA
12	DF	Malak Hussein	9 February 2012 (age 14)	(Lebanese Football Association) Jwaya
13	DF	Lynn Bou Ghazaleh	27 May 2011 (age 15)	(Lebanese Football Association) BFA
14	DF	Reem Youness	6 July 2010 (age 16)	(Lebanese Football Association) No Limits
6	MF	Gaelle Abou Malhab	4 March 2010 (age 16)	(Lebanese Football Association) BFA
11	MF	Meriam Monzer	27 February 2012 (age 14)	(Lebanese Football Association) No Limits
15	MF	Acil El Hajj	5 May 2011 (age 15)	(Lebanese Football Association) BFA
16	MF	Lamar El Arab	25 June 2012 (age 14)	(Lebanese Football Association) BFA
17	MF	Rama Kharroubi	27 July 2010 (age 16)	(Lebanese Football Association) Jwaya
21	MF	Leila Rahal El Arabi	17 April 2012 (age 14)	(Lebanese Football Association) BFA
7	FW	Christina Chebli	16 September 2011 (age 15)	(Lebanese Football Association) Lebanon United
8	FW	Sara Karnib	19 August 2010 (age 16)	(Football Australia) Western Sydney Wanderers
9	FW	Angy Boustany	9 September 2010 (age 16)	(Lebanese Football Association) No Limits
10	FW	Yara El Gitani	24 September 2010 (age 16)	(Lebanese Football Association) Nejmeh
18	FW	Christina Haidar	20 June 2012 (age 14)	(Lebanese Football Association) Nejmeh
19	FW	Sara Saad	14 January 2011 (age 15)	(Lebanese Football Association) Jwaya
20	FW	Monica Boulos	4 October 2012 (age 14)	(Lebanese Football Association) Salam Zgharta

== See also ==
- Lebanon women's national football team
- Lebanon women's national under-20 football team
- Lebanon men's national under-17 football team
- Women's football in Lebanon
- Football in Lebanon
