= Arab U-17 Women's Cup =

- Founded: 2015
- Region: Arab World (UAFA)
- Teams: 6
- Current champions: Lebanon
- Most championships: Lebanon (1 title)
- 2015 Arab U-17 Women's Cup

The Arab Under 17 Women's Cup (Arabic: كأس العرب للفتيات تحت 17 سنة) is an international football competition organised by the Union of Arab Football Associations, contested by the national women's teams under 17 in the Arab World. The first edition was hosted in Qatar in 2015, with Lebanon being crowned champions.

== History ==
The first edition was hosted by Qatar in 2015. It was organized by the Qatar Women's Sports Committee (QWSC) and the Qatar Football Association under the auspices of the Union of Arab Football Associations (UAFA).

== Results ==
Ed.	Year	Host	Final			Third Place Match		
Ed.	Year	Host	Winner	Score	Runner-up	3rd Place	Score	4th Place
1	2015	Qatar	Lebanon	1 – 0	Djibouti	Palestine	3 – 0	Algeria
2	2029	UAE	TBD			TBD		

== Performance by nation ==
Team	Titles	Runners-up	Third-place	Fourth-place
Lebanon	1 (2015)	–	–	–
Djibouti	–	1 (2015)	–	–
Palestine	–	–	1 (2015)	–
Algeria	–	–	–	1 (2015)

== Participating teams ==
Teams	(Qatar) 2015	Years
Algeria	4th	1
Djibouti	2nd	1
Iraq	GS	1
Lebanon	1st	1
Palestine	3rd	1
Qatar	GS	1
Total	6	6
