= 2018–19 Lebanese Women's Football League =

Football tournament season

Lebanese Women's Football League
- Season: 2018–19
- Dates: 18 November – 29 December 2018
- Champions: SAS; 4th title
- WAFF Championship: SAS
- Matches: 35
- Goals: 232 (6.63 per match)
- Top goalscorer: Mariam Camara (18 goals)

The 2018–19 Lebanese Women's Football League was the 12th edition of the Lebanese Women's Football League since it was formed in 2008.

SAS won their fourth title with a 2–1 victory over defending champions Zouk Mosbeh.

== League table ==
=== Group A ===
Pos	Team	Pld	W	D	L	GF	GA	GD	Pts	Qualification
1	ÓBerytus	4	4	0	0	18	0	+18	12	Qualification to the final four
2	Zouk Mosbeh	5	4	0	1	37	3	+34	12	Qualification to the final four
3	BFA	4	2	0	2	10	4	+6	6	
4	Stars of South	4	2	0	2	5	21	−16	6	
5	Hoops	5	1	0	4	1	24	−23	3	
6	Sporting High	4	0	0	4	2	21	−19	0	

Source: Goalzz.com
Rules for classification: 1) Points; 2) Goal difference; 3) Number of goals scored

=== Group B ===
Pos	Team	Pld	W	D	L	GF	GA	GD	Pts	Qualification
1	SAS	5	5	0	0	47	2	+45	15	Qualification to the final four
2	Akhaa Ahli Aley	5	4	0	1	35	3	+32	12	Qualification to the final four
3	Salam Zgharta	5	3	0	2	27	18	+9	9	
4	Sakafi Chhim	5	2	0	3	12	26	−14	6	
5	Kfarchima	5	1	0	4	4	24	−20	3	
6	Jabal Al-Shaykh	5	0	0	5	3	55	−52	0	

Source: Goalzz.com
Rules for classification: 1) Points; 2) Goal difference; 3) Number of goals scored

== Final four ==
Pos	Team	Pld	W	D	L	GF	GA	GD	Pts	Qualification
1	Zouk Mosbeh	3	2	1	0	15	1	+14	7	Qualification to the Final (Note: Since the top two teams finished par on points, the winner was established through a final.)
2	SAS	3	2	1	0	9	1	+8	7	Qualification to the Final
3	ÓBerytus	3	1	0	2	4	10	−6	3	
4	Akhaa Ahli Aley	3	0	0	3	0	16	−16	0	

Source: Goalzz.com
Rules for classification: 1) Points; 2) Goal difference; 3) Number of goals scored

=== Final ===
29 December 2018
13:15

SAS	2–1	Zouk Mosbeh
	Report

Fouad Chehab Stadium, Jounieh

SAS qualified for the 2019 WAFF Women's Clubs Championship.

== Top goalscorers ==
Rank	Player	Club	Goals
1	Mariam Camara	SAS	18
2	Christy Maalouf	Zouk Mosbeh	15
3	Cynthia Salha	Akhaa Ahli Aley	12
4	Lili Iskandar	Salam Zgharta	10
5	Sandra Onsa	Zouk Mosbeh	9
6	Yara Bou Rada	SAS	8
6	Carla Abdel Khalek	Akhaa Ahli Aley	8
6	Yara Srour	BFA	8
6	Reem Chalhoub	SAS	8
10	Hanin Tamim	SAS	7

== See also ==
- 2018–19 Lebanese Women's FA Cup
- 2018–19 Lebanese Women's Super Cup
