= 2019–20 Lebanese Women's Football League =

Football tournament season

Lebanese Women's Football League
- Season: 2019–20
- Dates: 2 November 2019 – 1 March 2020
- Champions: SAS; 5th title
- Matches: 83
- Goals: 490 (5.9 per match)
- Top goalscorer: Melanie Ghanime (20 goals)

The 2019–20 Lebanese Women's Football League was the 13th edition of the Lebanese Women's Football League since it was formed in 2008.

Defending champions SAS won their fifth title, after beating EFP 4–2 in the final matchday of the season. Safa, who made their debut, came second.

== League table ==
=== Group A ===
Pos	Team	Pld	W	D	L	GF	GA	GD	Pts	Qualification
1	SAS	7	6	1	0	54	2	+52	19	Qualification to the final eight
2	Safa	7	5	1	1	43	2	+41	16	Qualification to the final eight
3	BFA	7	3	4	0	41	4	+37	13	Qualification to the final eight
4	ÓBerytus	7	4	1	2	28	8	+20	13	Qualification to the final eight
5	United Tripoli	7	2	2	3	18	15	+3	8	
6	Super Girls	7	2	1	4	15	25	−10	7	
7	Primo	7	1	0	6	5	53	−48	3	
8	Helium	7	0	0	7	0	95	−95	0	

Source: women.football.lb
Rules for classification: 1) Points; 2) Goal difference; 3) Number of goals scored

=== Group B ===
Pos	Team	Pld	W	D	L	GF	GA	GD	Pts	Qualification
1	EFP	7	7	0	0	63	3	+60	21	Qualification to the final eight
2	Akhaa Ahli Aley	7	6	0	1	27	9	+18	18	Qualification to the final eight
3	Stars of South	7	4	0	3	27	8	+19	12	Qualification to the final eight
4	Montada North Lebanon	7	4	0	3	14	23	−9	12	Qualification to the final eight
5	Sakafi Chhim	7	3	0	4	17	18	−1	9	
6	Salam Zgharta	6	2	0	4	7	31	−24	6	
7	Hoops	6	0	1	5	2	32	−30	1	
8	Kfarchima	7	0	1	6	4	37	−33	1	

Source: women.football.lb
Rules for classification: 1) Points; 2) Goal difference; 3) Number of goals scored

== Final eight ==
Pos	Team	Pld	W	D	L	GF	GA	GD	Pts	Qualification
1	SAS (C)	7	6	0	1	35	6	+29	18	Champions
2	Safa	7	5	2	0	26	5	+21	17	
3	EFP	7	5	1	1	29	6	+23	16	
4	BFA	7	3	1	3	8	13	−5	10	
5	Akhaa Ahli Aley	7	1	3	3	8	22	−14	6	
6	Stars of South	7	1	1	5	8	21	−13	4	
7	ÓBerytus	7	1	1	5	7	26	−19	4	
8	Montada North Lebanon	7	1	1	5	4	26	−22	4	

Source: women.football.lb
Rules for classification: 1) Points; 2) Goal difference; 3) Number of goals scored
(C) Champions

== Top goalscorers ==
Rank	Player	Club	Goals
1	Melanie Ghanime	EFP	20
2	Cybelle Al Ghoul	EFP	18
3	Nathalie Matar	EFP	16
3	Ghiya Mtairek	Stars of South	16
5	Hiba Allouch	SAS	15
5	Lili Iskandar	SAS	15
7	Alice Kusi	Safa	13
7	Samira Awad	Safa	13
7	Anji Saad	Safa	13
10	Yara Bou Rada	SAS	10
10	Lara Bahlawan	SAS	10
