= Iraq women's national under-17 football team =

National association football team

Iraq Women's U-17
- Association: Iraq Football Association
- Head coach: Adil Qader
- FIFA code: IRQ
First colours	Second colours	Third colours

Biggest win
- Palestine 0–1 Iraq (Hanoi, Vietnam, 3 September 2016)

Biggest defeat
- India 14–0 Iraq (Selayang, Malaysia, 5 October 2026)

The Iraq women's national under-17 football team is the female representative football team for under-17, under-16 and under-15 competitions and it is controlled by Iraq Football Association.

== Competitions record ==
=== FIFA U-17 Women's World Cup record ===
FIFA U-17 Women's World Cup Finals
Year	Result	Position	GP	W	D*	L	GF	GA	GD
(New Zealand) 2008 to (Jordan) 2016	Did not enter	-	-	-	-	-	-	-	-
(Uruguay) 2018 to (India) 2022	Did not qualify	-	-	-	-	-	-	-	-
(Dominican Republic) 2024	Withdrawn								
(Morocco) 2025 to (Morocco) 2027	Did not qualify	-	-	-	-	-	-	-	-
Total	0/9	-	-	-	-	-	-	-	-

*Draws include knockout matches decided on penalty kicks.

=== AFC U-17 Women's Asian Cup record ===
AFC U-17 Women's Asian Cup record									Qualification record					
Year	Result	Position	GP	W	D*	L	GF	GA	GP	W	D	L	GF	GA
(South Korea) 2005 to (China) 2015	Did not enter								Did not enter					
(Thailand) 2017	Did not qualify								5	1	0	4	2	17
(Thailand) 2019 to (China) 2026	Did not enter								Did not enter					
(China) 2027	Did not qualify								3	0	0	3	0	19
Total	0/11	0/0	0	0	0	0	0	0	8	1	0	7	2	36

*Draws include knockout matches decided on penalty kicks.

=== Arab U-17 Women's Cup ===
Arab U-17 Women's Cup
Appearances: 1
Year	Round	Position	Pld	W	D	L	GF	GA
(Qatar) 2015	Group stage	6th	2	0	0	2	0	12
Total	1/1	6th	2	0	0	2	0	12

== Matches ==
=== Recent results and fixtures ===
Win Draw Loss

5 October 2026 2027 AFC U17 WACQ	India	14–0	Iraq	Selayang, Malaysia
16:00 UTC+8	A. Kumari 9', 12', 39', 47', 71'; Baskey 14'; Sorokhaibam 21', 30'; Longjam 42'; Barman 49'; Basnett 70', 86'; Hasan 78'; Senjam 90+3'	Report		Stadium: MP Selayang Stadium; Referee: Lê Thị Ly (Vietnam)

8 October 2026 2027 AFC U17 WACQ	Iraq	0–4	Malaysia	Selayang, Malaysia
21:00 UTC+8		Report	Aisyah 19'; Qaseh Riana 45+'; Lim You 58'; Aisha 85'	Stadium: MP Selayang Stadium; Referee: Natalia Sotnikova (Tajikistan)

11 October 2026 2027 AFC U17 WACQ	Syria	1–0	Iraq	Selayang, Malaysia
15:30 UTC+8	Ato 53'	Report		Stadium: MP Selayang Stadium; Referee: Wong Joki Christie (Hong Kong)

== Players ==
=== Current squad ===
- The following 18 players were called up for the 2017 AFC U-16 Women's Championship qualification:
- Match date: 25 August - 3 September 2016
- Opposition: Hong Kong, Vietnam, Australia, Uzbekistan and Palestine
- Caps and goals correct as of: 3 September 2016, after the match against Palestine

No.	Pos.	Player	Date of birth (age)	Caps	Goals	Club
1	GK	Zainab Ahmed	28 November 2006 (age 19)	5	0	(Iraq Football Association)
20	GK	Israa Qasim Jameel		0	0	(Iraq Football Association)
21	GK	Tamara Abdulhakeem		0	0	(Iraq Football Association)
5	DF	Hanan Tahseen Mohsin	3 September 2007 (age 19)	5	0	(Iraq Football Association)
6	DF	Saja Qasim Mohsin	3 September 2007 (age 19)	5	0	(Iraq Football Association)
8	DF	Asraa Adnan Hashem		4	0	(Iraq Football Association)
19	DF	Amenah Jabbar Saeed	28 November 2007 (age 18)	5	0	(Iraq Football Association)
22	DF	Khoshee Saleem		0	0	(Iraq Football Association)
4	MF	Shankah Ali Azzat	6 October 2007 (age 19)	5	0	(Iraq Football Association)
9	MF	Fatimah Qasim Fadhil		4	0	(Iraq Football Association)
11	MF	Ameena Mohammed	28 November 2007 (age 18)	5	0	(Iraq Football Association)
12	MF	Lanja Farhad Ahmed	28 November 2008 (age 17)	5	1	(Iraq Football Association)
14	MF	Zaynab Wesam Yaseen		0	0	(Iraq Football Association)
17	MF	Ranya Hussein Kadhim		5	0	(Iraq Football Association)
10	FW	Elaf Sabah		5	1	(Iraq Football Association)
13	FW	Afrah Sedeeq Mahdi		5	0	(Iraq Football Association)
15	FW	Tabarekalraman		5	0	(Iraq Football Association)
16	FW	Zinah Mohanad Saleem		4	0	(Iraq Football Association)

== See also ==
- Iraq women's national football team
- Iraq men's national football team
- Iraq men's national under-23 football team
- Iraq men's national under-20 football team
- Iraq men's national under-17 football team
