= Jwaya SC (women) =

Lebanese women's football club

Jwaya
- Full name: Jwaya Sporting Club
- Founded: 1 August 2018 (8 years ago) as Terdeba Stars; 2 October 2025 (13 months ago) as Jwaya SC
- Chairman: Wissam Saad
- Manager: Jouana Hamze
- League: Lebanese Women's Football League
- 2025–26: Lebanese Women's Football League, 4th of 9
Home colours	Away colours

Jwaya Sporting Club (Arabic: نادي جويا الرياضي), commonly referred to as Jwaya, is a women's football club based in Jwaya, Lebanon. It is the women's section of Jwaya SC and competes in the Lebanese Women's Football League.

The club was previously known as Terdeba Stars (2018–2020) and Southern Stars (2020–2025).

== History ==
Southern Stars were founded on 1 August 2018 as Terdeba Stars (Arabic: نجوم طير دبّا, romanized: Noujoum Terdeba), and first competed in the 2018–19 Lebanese Women's Football League; they finished in fourth place in Group A in their debut season. The following season, the club changed its name to Southern Stars (Arabic: نجوم الجنوب, romanized: Noujoum Al Janoub), to appeal to a larger fanbase. They finished third in Group B, qualifying to the Final Eight where they finished sixth.

On 2 October 2025, the club was acquired by Jwaya SC and renamed to reflect the ownership change.

== Players ==
=== Current squad ===
As of 19 April 2025

Note: Flags indicate national team as defined under FIFA eligibility rules; some limited exceptions apply. Players may hold more than one non-FIFA nationality.

No.	Pos.	Nation	Player
1	GK	LBN	Hiba Al Mokli
2	FW	LBN	Sara Fakih
4	DF	PLE	Kinda Maarouf
6	MF	LBN	Ranim Naboulsi
7	FW	LBN	Zeinab Kharoubi
8	DF	LBN	Maria Slim (captain)
9	FW	LBN	Nour Fatima Fakih
10	MF	LBN	Hala Bawab
11	DF	LBN	Sarah Atwi
12	MF	LBN	Nagham Mohsen
14	DF	LBN	Nour Awada
16	FW	LBN	Sarah Saad

No.	Pos.	Nation	Player
17	DF	LBN	Rayan Sadek
18		LBN	Ranim Suleiman
21	DF	LBN	Cyrine Termos
22	DF	LBN	Sahar Kouheil
23	DF	LBN	Rayane Zouheir
24	FW	LBN	Alaa Mohsen
27	DF	USA	Aya Saksouk
28	FW	LBN	Mayssa El Dihaoui
30	DF	PLE	Zeinab Ouweid
37	DF	LBN	Reem Kawtharani
99	GK	LBN	Marie Jaffal

== Technical staff ==
Position	Staff
Head coach	(Lebanon) Jouana Hamze
Team manager	(Lebanon) Ali Kaawar
Goalkeeper coach	(Lebanon) Reine Alameh
Coach	(Lebanon) Hassan Khalife
Equipment manager	(Lebanon) Kinda Maarouf
Physical therapist	(Lebanon) Nouryaz Jaber

Last updated: 15 August 2026

== See also ==
- Women's football in Lebanon
- List of women's association football clubs in Lebanon
