= 2021 Arab Women's Cup squads =

International women's football tournament

The 2021 Arab Women's Cup is an international women's football tournament held in Egypt from 24 August to 6 September 2021. The eight national teams involved in the tournament were required to register a squad of up to 24 players, including three goalkeepers. Only players in these squads were eligible to take part in the tournament.

The age listed for each player is on 24 August 2021, the first day of the tournament. The numbers of caps and goals listed for each player do not include any matches played after the start of tournament. The club listed is the club for which the player last played a competitive match prior to the tournament. (Note: This is the club a player was last able to play for during the previous season in the event a player did not play a competitive match.) The nationality for each club reflects the national association (not the league) to which the club is affiliated. A flag is included for coaches who are of a different nationality than their own national team.

== Group A ==
=== Egypt ===
Coach: Mohamad Kamal Atieh Ismail

| No. | Pos. | Player | Date of birth (age) | Caps | Goals | Club |
|---|---|---|---|---|---|---|
| 2 | MF | Sherouk Farhan | 26 November 1999 (aged 21) | | | (Egyptian Football Association) Wadi Degla |
| 10 | FW | Nadine Ghazi | 24 November 2001 (aged 19) | | | (Egyptian Football Association) El Gouna |
| 11 | FW | Noha Tarek | 1 March 1999 (aged 22) | | | |
| 13 | MF | Samia Adam | 19 April 1996 (aged 25) | | | |
| 14 | | Sally Mansour | | | | |
| 16 | GK | Farah Hassan | 2 July 2001 (aged 20) | | | (Egyptian Football Association) Wadi Degla |
| 17 | | Sika | | | | |
| 18 | | Sarah Essam | | | | |
| 19 | MF | Engy Ahmed | 4 September 1986 (aged 34) | | | |
| 21 | FW | Dana Nadda | | | | (United States Soccer Federation) IMG Academy |
| 22 | FW | Asmaa Gomaa | 5 September 1994 (aged 26) | | | (Egyptian Football Association) Wadi Degla |
| 23 | GK | Merna Farouk | | | | |
| 24 | | Omney Samir | | | | |
| 25 | | Amira Mohamed Abdel Hamid | | | | |
| 27 | FW | Manar Salem | 30 March 2002 (aged 19) | | | (Egyptian Football Association) Wadi Degla |
| 30 | MF | Laila El Behery | | | | (United States Soccer Federation) UC Irvine Anteaters |
| | GK | Israa El Said Ibrahim | | | | |
| | DF | Yasmine Abu El Joud | 1 January 1988 (aged 33) | | | (Egyptian Football Association) Wadi Degla |
| | DF | Passant Abdel Aziz Mohamed | 24 September 1998 (aged 22) | | | (Egyptian Football Association) Wadi Degla |
| | MF | Marwa Tawfic Ahmed | 3 July 1998 (aged 23) | | | (Egyptian Football Association) Wadi Degla |
| | MF | Merna Mohsen | 5 February 1996 (aged 25) | | | (Egyptian Football Association) Al Tayaran |
| | FW | Aliaa El Zenouki | 15 June 1997 (aged 24) | | | |
| | | Samar El Zayat | | | | |
| | | Amal Mostafa | | | | |

=== Lebanon ===
Coach: Wael Gharzeddine

| No. | Pos. | Player | Date of birth (age) | Caps | Goals | Club |
|---|---|---|---|---|---|---|
| 1 | GK | Sinal Breiche | 3 March 2003 (aged 18) | 0 | 0 | (Lebanese Football Association) Akhaa Ahli Aley |
| 2 | DF | Mira Hoteit | 20 September 2000 (aged 20) | 7 | 0 | (Lebanese Football Association) Safa |
| 3 | DF | Rana Al Mokdad | 18 November 1998 (aged 22) | 7 | 1 | (Lebanese Football Association) SAS |
| 4 | DF | Jo-Anne Beaumier | 10 April 1996 (aged 25) | 2 | 0 | (Lebanese Football Association) BFA |
| 5 | DF | Aya Jamal-Eddine | 11 October 1997 (aged 23) | 8 | 0 | (Lebanese Football Association) Safa |
| 6 | MF | Nathalie Matar (Captain) | 20 September 1995 (aged 25) | 5 | 0 | (Lebanese Football Association) EFP |
| 7 | FW | Samira Awad | 30 June 2000 (aged 21) | 9 | 2 | (Lebanese Football Association) Safa |
| 8 | FW | Israa Toufaily | 27 May 2002 (aged 19) | 0 | 0 | (Lebanese Football Association) Primo |
| 10 | FW | Yara Bou Rada | 7 August 2000 (aged 21) | 9 | 0 | (Lebanese Football Association) Safa |
| 11 | FW | Hanin Tamim | 5 April 2000 (aged 21) | 9 | 3 | (Lebanese Football Association) SAS |
| 12 | DF | Stephanie El Kazzi | 29 September 2004 (aged 16) | 0 | 0 | (Lebanese Football Association) EFP |
| 13 | MF | Carla Abdel Khalek | 14 May 2001 (aged 20) | 0 | 0 | (Lebanese Football Association) BFA |
| 14 | DF | Nour Noujaim | 6 February 2004 (aged 17) | 3 | 0 | (Lebanese Football Association) EFP |
| 15 | FW | Waad Raad | 9 November 2006 (aged 14) | 0 | 0 | (Lebanese Football Association) SAS |
| 16 | MF | Dima Al Kasti | 13 December 2001 (aged 19) | 3 | 1 | (Lebanese Football Association) Safa |
| 17 | MF | Rhea May Taleb | 20 March 2001 (aged 20) | 2 | 0 | (Lebanese Football Association) Safa |
| 18 | MF | Evelina Haddad | 30 April 2005 (aged 16) | 0 | 0 | (Lebanese Football Association) EFP |
| 19 | FW | Christy Maalouf | 20 December 2005 (aged 15) | 0 | 0 | (Lebanese Football Association) EFP |
| 20 | MF | Syntia Salha | 12 January 2003 (aged 18) | 3 | 0 | (Lebanese Football Association) Safa |
| 21 | MF | Zahwa Arabi | 2 November 2005 (aged 15) | 0 | 0 | (Lebanese Football Association) United Tripoli |
| 22 | GK | Lamitta El Dib | 2 September 2005 (aged 15) | 0 | 0 | (Lebanese Football Association) EFP |
| 23 | GK | Racha Yaghi | 10 June 2002 (aged 19) | 8 | 0 | (Lebanese Football Association) Safa |

=== Sudan ===
Coach: Farouk Gabra

| No. | Pos. | Player | Date of birth (age) | Caps | Goals | Club |
|---|---|---|---|---|---|---|
| | | Queen Mehanna Osman | | | | (Sudan Football Association) Nur Al Maaref |
| | | Amira Ismail | | | | (Sudan Football Association) El Hilal El Obeid |
| | GK | Amina Omar Liwaa | | | | (Sudan Football Association) Al Hilal Dalang |
| | | Nadar Nawwar Awad | | | | |
| | DF | Asmaa Abkar Abdallah | | | | (Sudan Football Association) Al-Difaa |
| | MF | Nidal Fadlallah | | | | (Sudan Football Association) Al-Tahadi |
| | MF | Hala Zakaria Mostafi | | | | (Sudan Football Association) Al-Tahadi |
| | DF | Nariman Lino Joseph | | | | (Sudan Football Association) Al-Tahadi |
| | MF | Amal Abdelaziz | | | | (Sudan Football Association) Al-Difaa |
| | MF | Fatima Kidal | | | | (Sudan Football Association) Al-Difaa |
| | | Bkhaite Elias | | | | (Sudan Football Association) Al-Difaa |
| | FW | Rawan Samer Abdelmoneim | | | | (Sudan Football Association) Al-Tahadi |
| | DF | Nisrine Mohammad Ali | | | | (Sudan Football Association) Al-Difaa |
| | DF | Raghda Badereddine | | | | (Sudan Football Association) Alkournuk |
| | | Arjwan Isam | | | | (Sudan Football Association) Al-Tahadi |
| | | Faten Zaher | | | | (Sudan Football Association) Alkournuk |
| | FW | Elham Bilton | | | | (Sudan Football Association) Al-Difaa |
| | | Noura Mohammad Yehya | | | | (Sudan Football Association) Alkournuk |
| | FW | Rayan Ragab | | | | (Sudan Football Association) Al-Tahadi |
| | DF | Rania Abkar | | | | (Sudan Football Association) Al-Tahadi |
| | | Samia Kassam Hussein | | | | (Sudan Football Association) Al-Tahadi |
| | DF | Najlaa Saleh | | | | (Sudan Football Association) Al-Tahadi |

=== Tunisia ===
Coach: Samir Landolssi

| No. | Pos. | Player | Date of birth (age) | Caps | Goals | Club |
|---|---|---|---|---|---|---|
| 1 | GK | Mariem Ben Sassi | 1 April 1991 (aged 30) | | | (Tunisian Football Federation) BH Bank |
| 2 | DF | Dhekra Mahfoudh | 23 May 1992 (aged 29) | | | (Tunisian Football Federation) Sbiba |
| 4 | DF | Chaima Alabbassi (Captain) | 4 June 1993 (aged 28) | | | (Tunisian Football Federation) BH Bank |
| 5 | DF | Wafa Masoud | 24 October 1995 (aged 25) | | | (Tunisian Football Federation) Gafsa |
| 6 | MF | Yasmine Klaii | | | | (French Football Federation) Lyon |
| 9 | FW | Sabrine Ellouzi | 28 June 1997 (aged 24) | | | (Royal Dutch Football Association) Excelsior |
| 10 | FW | Ahlem Hattab | | | | (Tunisian Football Federation) Sousse |
| 11 | FW | Imen Mchara | 15 February 1995 (aged 26) | | | (Tunisian Football Federation) Sousse |
| 13 | MF | Yassmine Jmaii | 12 June 1991 (aged 30) | | | (Tunisian Football Federation) Sahal |
| 14 | MF | Ghada Ayadi | 10 August 1992 (aged 29) | | | (Jordan Football Association) Amman |
| 15 | FW | Eya Jeddi | 13 August 1999 (aged 22) | | | (Tunisian Football Federation) Sousse |
| 16 | GK | Soulayma Jabrani | 25 February 1997 (aged 24) | | | (Tunisian Football Federation) Sousse |
| 17 | FW | Hana Hamdi | 26 November 1995 (aged 25) | | | (German Football Association) Borussia Bocholt |
| 18 | DF | Samia Ouni | 30 May 1992 (aged 29) | | | (Jordan Football Association) Amman |
| 20 | FW | Leila Maknoun | 19 January 2002 (aged 19) | | | (French Football Federation) Osny |
| 21 | DF | Jassmina Barhoumi | 8 September 2002 (aged 18) | | | (German Football Association) 1. FFC Niederkirchen |
| 22 | GK | Najla Harrathi | | | | (Tunisian Football Federation) Bouhajla |
| 23 | MF | Eya Bellaaj | 26 February 1998 (aged 23) | | | (Tunisian Football Federation) BH Bank |
| | MF | Mariem Ben Achour | 18 May 1991 (aged 30) | | | (French Football Federation) Osny |
| | FW | Rimel Aboud | | | | (Tunisian Football Federation) BH Bank |
| | DF | Chiraz Ben Ali | | | | (Tunisian Football Federation) Sousse |
| | MF | Ibtissem Ben Mohamed | | | | (Tunisian Football Federation) BH Bank |

== Group B ==
=== Algeria ===
Coach: Radia Fertoul

| No. | Pos. | Player | Date of birth (age) | Caps | Goals | Club |
|---|---|---|---|---|---|---|
| 1 | GK | Kahina Takenint | 21 May 1991 (aged 30) | | | (Algerian Football Federation) AS Sûreté Nationale |
| 2 | DF | Isma Ouadah (Captain) | 19 January 1983 (aged 38) | | | (Algerian Football Federation) AS Sûreté Nationale |
| 3 | DF | Wassila Alouache | 11 July 2000 (aged 21) | | | (Algerian Football Federation) CFA Akbou |
| 4 | DF | Kelthoum Arbi Aouda | 25 September 1987 (aged 33) | | | (Algerian Football Federation) Afak Relizane |
| 5 | DF | Fatima Bara | 21 February 1990 (aged 31) | | | (Algerian Football Federation) ASE Alger Centre |
| 6 | MF | Abla Bensenouci | 22 December 2000 (aged 20) | | | (Algerian Football Federation) FC Constantine |
| 7 | FW | Ferial Daoui | 15 December 1999 (aged 21) | | | (Algerian Football Federation) FC Constantine |
| 10 | FW | Imène Merrouche | 25 April 1994 (aged 27) | | | (Algerian Football Federation) FC Constantine |
| 11 | MF | Zineb Kendouci | 16 March 1994 (aged 27) | | | (Algerian Football Federation) Afak Relizane |
| 12 | FW | Bouchra Bendaha | | | | (Algerian Football Federation) Afak Relizane |
| 13 | MF | Aïcha Hamidèche | 2 October 2001 (aged 19) | | | (Algerian Football Federation) Afak Relizane |
| 14 | FW | Madina Ramdani | 13 May 1991 (aged 30) | | | (Algerian Football Federation) AS Sûreté Nationale |
| 15 | MF | Fethia Bekhedda | 9 July 1990 (age 35) | | | (Algerian Football Federation) JF Khroub |
| 17 | FW | Rahma Benaichouche | | | | (Algerian Football Federation) JF Khroub |
| 19 | FW | Naïma Bouhenni | 23 October 1985 (aged 35) | | | (Algerian Football Federation) Afak Relizane |
| 21 | MF | Mounia Houhèche | 5 November 1992 (aged 28) | | | (Algerian Football Federation) AS Sûreté Nationale |
| 22 | MF | Lina Chabane | 14 April 1997 (aged 24) | | | (French Football Federation) FC Fleury 91 |
| 24 | FW | Kenza Hadjar | 24 December 1992 (aged 28) | | | (Algerian Football Federation) AS Sûreté Nationale |
| | GK | Amina Haleyi | 10 September 1992 (aged 28) | | | (Algerian Football Federation) ASE Alger Centre |
| | GK | Lamia Lounas | | | | (Algerian Football Federation) JF Khroub |
| | DF | Laetitia Akli | | | | (Algerian Football Federation) ASE Alger Centre |
| | DF | Fouzia Bakli | | | | (Algerian Football Federation) FC Constantine |
| | MF | Ikram Bahri | 15 March 2002 (aged 19) | | | (Algerian Football Federation) ASE Alger Centre |

=== Jordan ===
Coach: (Portugal) David Nascimento

| No. | Pos. | Player | Date of birth (age) | Caps | Goals | Club |
|---|---|---|---|---|---|---|
| 1 | GK | Sherin Al-Shalabe | 3 June 1994 (aged 27) | | | (Jordan Football Association) Shabab Al-Ordon |
| 2 | FW | Bana Al-Bitar | 6 October 1996 (aged 24) | | | |
| 3 | DF | Alanoud Ihab | 18 May 1999 (aged 22) | | | |
| 4 | MF | Luna Al-Masri | 9 March 1994 (aged 27) | | | |
| 5 | FW | Tala Al-Barghouthy | 11 April 2002 (aged 19) | | | |
| 6 | MF | Zaina Hazem | 8 July 2004 (aged 17) | | | |
| 7 | DF | Nour Zoqash | 1 November 1999 (aged 21) | | | (Jordan Football Association) Shabab Al-Ordon |
| 8 | MF | Enas Al-Jamaeen | 11 November 2003 (aged 17) | | | |
| 11 | FW | Maysa Jbarah | 20 September 1989 (aged 31) | | | (French Football Federation) Thonon Évian |
| 12 | GK | Rond Kassab | | | | |
| 13 | FW | Leen Al-Btoush | 20 July 2001 (aged 20) | | | |
| 14 | DF | Enshirah Al-Hyasat | 25 November 1991 (aged 29) | | | |
| 15 | MF | Mai Sweilem | 25 September 1995 (aged 25) | | | |
| 16 | MF | Shahnaz Jebreen | 28 July 1992 (aged 29) | | | (Jordan Football Association) Amman SC |
| 17 | MF | Rouzbahan Fraij | 7 April 2000 (aged 21) | | | (Jordan Football Association) Shabab Al-Ordon |
| 18 | MF | Tasnim Isleem | 4 March 2001 (aged 20) | | | |
| 19 | DF | Ayah Al-Majali | 9 March 1992 (aged 29) | | | (Jordan Football Association) Shabab Al-Ordon |
| 20 | FW | Lina Al-Saheb | 18 August 1996 (aged 25) | | | |
| 21 | DF | Rand Abu-Hussein | 1 March 1997 (aged 24) | | | |
| 22 | GK | Malak Shannak | 1 August 1998 (aged 23) | | | (Jordan Football Association) Amman SC |
| 24 | DF | Taqi Ghazi | 9 July 2005 (aged 16) | | | |
| 25 | MF | Reetal Al-Shoubaki | 1 August 2005 (aged 16) | | | |
| 26 | MF | Tasneem Abu-Rob | 14 November 2000 (aged 20) | | | |

=== Palestine ===
Coach: Simon Khair

| No. | Pos. | Player | Date of birth (age) | Caps | Goals | Club |
|---|---|---|---|---|---|---|
| | GK | Anwar Shaikh | 1 March 1988 (aged 33) | | | |
| | GK | Nour Eleyan | 1 June 1998 (aged 23) | | | |
| | GK | Leen Qaraqra | 5 September 2000 (aged 20) | | | |
| | DF | Shaden Abuzuluf | 16 February 1997 (aged 24) | | | |
| | DF | Razan Awad | 26 July 2003 (aged 18) | | | |
| | DF | Ayah Khattab | 22 December 1999 (aged 21) | | | |
| | DF | Miral Al Sarras | 1 September 2000 (aged 20) | | | |
| | MF | Nadin Elias | 31 May 1995 (aged 26) | | | |
| | MF | Sireen Ghattas | 29 May 2001 (aged 20) | | | |
| | MF | Celine Khoury | 11 May 2000 (aged 21) | | | |
| | MF | Dima Said | 27 May 1994 (aged 27) | | | |
| | MF | Jeniver Shattara | 9 May 2003 (aged 18) | | | |
| | FW | Namir Hamad | 17 September 2001 (aged 19) | | | |
| | FW | Aline Khoury | 11 May 2000 (aged 21) | | | |
| | FW | Laila Al Shaikh | 20 March 2001 (aged 20) | | | |
| | FW | Caroline Sohgian | 8 July 1993 (aged 28) | | | (Palestinian Football Association) Arab Orthodox |
| | FW | Lurin Tanas | 5 December 1998 (aged 22) | | | |
| | | Lana Abedrabbo | | | | |
| | | Bissan Abou Ayta | | | | |
| | | Izabella Yasmine Al Ansari | | | | |
| | | Parthina Kamsiya | | | | |
| | | Dima Kayyal | | | | |
| | | Tamara Mouallem | | | | |
| | | Siwar Rabah | | | | |
