= 2022 WAFF Women's Championship squads =

The 2022 WAFF Women's Championship was an international women's football tournament held in Jordan from 29 August to 4 September 2022. The four national teams involved in the tournament registered a squad of 23 players, including three goalkeepers. Only these players were eligible to take part in the tournament.

The age listed for each player is on 29 August 2022, the first day of the tournament. The numbers of caps and goals listed for each player do not include any matches played after the start of tournament. The club listed is the club for which the player last played a competitive match prior to the tournament. (Note: This is the club a player was last able to play for during the previous season in the event a player did not play a competitive match.) The nationality for each club reflects the national association (not the league) to which the club is affiliated. A flag is included for coaches whose nationality differs from that of their own national team.

== Teams ==
=== Jordan ===
Coach: (Cape Verde) David Nascimento

No.	Pos.	Player	Date of birth (age)	Caps	Goals	Club
1	GK	Sherin Al Shalabe				
2	DF	Taqi Ghazi				
3	DF	Alanoud Ghazi				
4	MF	Alia Nael				
5	DF	Anfal Al Sufy				
6	MF	Noor Al Mashayek				
7	MF	Maya Owaisat				
8	FW	Tahreer Al Qawasmeh				
9	FW	Bana Al Bitar				
10	MF	Enas Al Jamaeen				
11	FW	Maysa Jbarah (captain)				
12	GK	Rawned Kassap				
13	FW	Leen Al Btoush				
14	FW	Lina Al Saheb				
15	MF	Mai Sweilem				
16	MF	Raneem Daoud				
17	MF	Rouzbahan Fraij				
18	MF	Tasnim Isleem				
19	DF	Ayah Al Majalli				
20	MF	Lana Feras				
21	DF	Rand Abu-Hussein				
22	GK	Malak Shannak				
23	MF	Tasneem Abu-Rob				

=== Palestine ===
Coach: Nasser Beitello

No.	Pos.	Player	Date of birth (age)	Caps	Goals	Club
1	GK	Leen Qarqara				
2	DF	Joelle Rabee				
3	DF	Dima Kayyal				
4	MF	Sireen Ghattas				
5	DF	Ayah Khattab				
6	FW	Hala Sarawi				
7	FW	Lurin Tanas				
8	MF	Jeinver Shattara				
9	FW	Caroline Sohgian (captain)				
10	FW	Laila Al Shaikh				
11	FW	Aline Khoury				
12	MF	Nadin Elias				
13		Lama Jarayseh				
14	MF	Celine Khoury				
15		Aya Abed				
16		Amna Bakri				
17	DF	Mira Natour				
18		Camellia Nasrah				
19		Lillian Nasrah				
20		Jehan Dib				
21		Isabela Yasmine Al Ansari				
22	GK	Nour Eleyan				
23	GK	Anwar Shaikh				

=== Lebanon ===
Coach: Hagop Demirjian

No.	Pos.	Player	Date of birth (age)	Caps	Goals	Club
1	GK	Racha Yaghi	10 June 2002 (aged 20)	11	0	(Lebanese Football Association) Safa
2	DF	Amina Karime	20 December 2005 (aged 16)	1	0	(Lebanese Football Association) BFA
3	DF	Celine Al Haddad	12 March 2001 (aged 21)	8	0	(Lebanese Football Association) SAS
4	DF	Julie Atallah	28 July 2005 (aged 17)	0	0	(Lebanese Football Association) EFP
5	FW	Christy Maalouf	20 December 2005 (aged 16)	8	4	(Lebanese Football Association) EFP
6	MF	Sophie Fayad	8 December 2004 (aged 17)	2	0	(Lebanese Football Association) EFP
7	MF	Syntia Salha	12 January 2003 (aged 19)	10	3	(Lebanese Football Association) Safa
8	MF	Zahraa Assaf	5 January 2004 (aged 18)	2	0	(Lebanese Football Association) SAS
9	DF	Rana Al Mokdad	18 November 1998 (aged 23)	14	1	(Lebanese Football Association) SAS
10	MF	Lili Iskandar	16 May 2002 (aged 20)	9	1	(Jordan Football Association) Etihad
11	FW	Mone Linnette Mekkawi	30 October 1992 (aged 29)	2	0	(Lebanese Football Association) Super Girls
12	DF	Joya-Maria Azzi	23 September 2000 (aged 21)	6	0	(United States Soccer Federation) Iowa Raptors FC
13	DF	Waed Raed	9 November 2006 (aged 15)	4	0	(Lebanese Football Association) SAS
14	MF	Nathalie Matar (captain)	20 September 1995 (aged 26)	13+	0	(Lebanese Football Association) EFP
15	FW	Zahwa Arabi	2 November 2005 (aged 16)	4	0	(Lebanese Football Association) EFP
16	DF	Aya Al Jurdi	8 April 1998 (aged 24)	6+	1	(Lebanese Football Association) SAS
17	FW	Hiba Allouch	28 June 2004 (aged 18)	2	0	(Lebanese Football Association) SAS
18	MF	Evelina El Haddad	30 April 2005 (aged 17)	7	0	(Lebanese Football Association) EFP
19	FW	Petra Khoury	13 July 1995 (aged 27)	0	0	(Swedish Football Association) Telge United
20	FW	Dima Al Kasti	13 December 2001 (aged 20)	9	3	(Lebanese Football Association) Safa
21	FW	Pilar Khoury	25 August 1994 (aged 28)	1	0	(French Football Federation) Nantes
22	GK	Sinal Breiche	3 March 2003 (aged 19)	5	0	(Lebanese Football Association) BFA
23	GK	Lamitta El Dib	2 September 2005 (aged 16)	3	0	(Lebanese Football Association) EFP

=== Syria ===
Coach: Salim Jblawi

No.	Pos.	Player	Date of birth (age)	Caps	Goals	Club
1	GK	Raneem Abo Lateef				
2	DF	Shurouk Issa				
3	DF	Elham Kord Oghlan (captain)				
4	MF	Mai Al Jany				
5	DF	Mayar Alloush				
6	DF	Rima Dibo				
7	MF	Roaa Gharib				
8	MF	Tala Noureddin				
9	FW	Haya Halabi				
10	FW	Rouna Aizouk				
11	MF	Marleen Al Milaa				
12	DF	Aheen Mohammad				
13	MF	Raneem Al Safadi				
14	MF	Aya Mohammad				
15	DF	Rama Rania Al Halah				
16	MF	Maisalon Mahfoud				
17	MF	Sedra Khezran				
18	FW	Aysha Hamo				
19	DF	Razan Khwandi				
20	MF	Lana Ibrahem				
21	DF	Halaz Haji				
22	GK	Noor Jumaa				
23	GK	Khuzama Al Melhem				
