= Celine Haidar =

Lebanese footballer (born 2005)

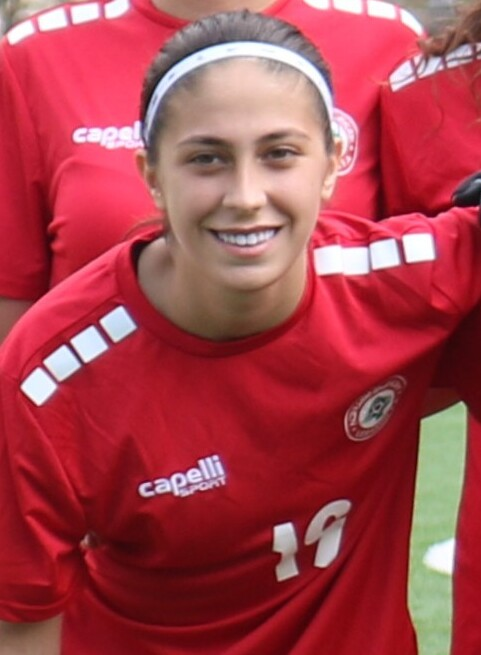
- Haidar with Lebanon U18 in 2022

Personal information
- Full name: Celine Abbas Haidar
- Date of birth: 13 April 2005 (age 21)
- Place of birth: Al-Qusaibah, Lebanon
- Height: 1.65 m (5 ft 5 in)
- Position: Midfielder

Team information
- Current team: BFA
- Number: 6

Youth career
- Akhaa Ahli Aley
- 2020–2022: Safa
- 2022–2023: BFA

Senior career*
Years	Team	Apps	(Gls)
2021–2022	Safa	3	(0)
2022–	BFA	33	(1)

International career^{‡}
2022	Lebanon U18		
- Lebanon U20
Medal record
Women's football
Representing Lebanon
WAFF U-18 Girls Championship
Gold medal – first place	2022 Lebanon	U-18 Team
- * Club domestic league appearances and goals as of 04:59, 17 December 2024 (UTC) ‡ National team caps and goals as of 04:59, 17 December 2024 (UTC)

Celine Abbas Haidar (Arabic: سيلين عباس حيدر; born 13 April 2005) is a Lebanese footballer who most recently played as a midfielder for Lebanese club BFA.

Haidar began her senior career with Safa before joining BFA in 2022. She helped BFA win the Lebanese Women's Football League in 2023–24 and captained the club. At international level, Haidar represented Lebanon at under-18 and under-20 level and won the 2022 WAFF U-18 Championship. She was subsequently called up to the senior national team.

On 16 November 2024, Haidar sustained a severe traumatic brain injury after being struck by shrapnel during an Israeli airstrike in Beirut. She subsequently remained in a coma for several weeks and underwent a lengthy rehabilitation. By March 2026, she had progressed to walking and running.

== Early life ==
Celine Abbas Haidar was born on 13 April 2005 in Al-Qusaibah, Lebanon, to Abbas Haidar and Saana Shahrour. She is the youngest of three children. She developed an interest in football from a young age and regularly played with boys in her local area. Haidar's family supported her pursuit of football despite the sport's limited opportunities for women in Lebanon.

== Club career ==
=== Safa ===
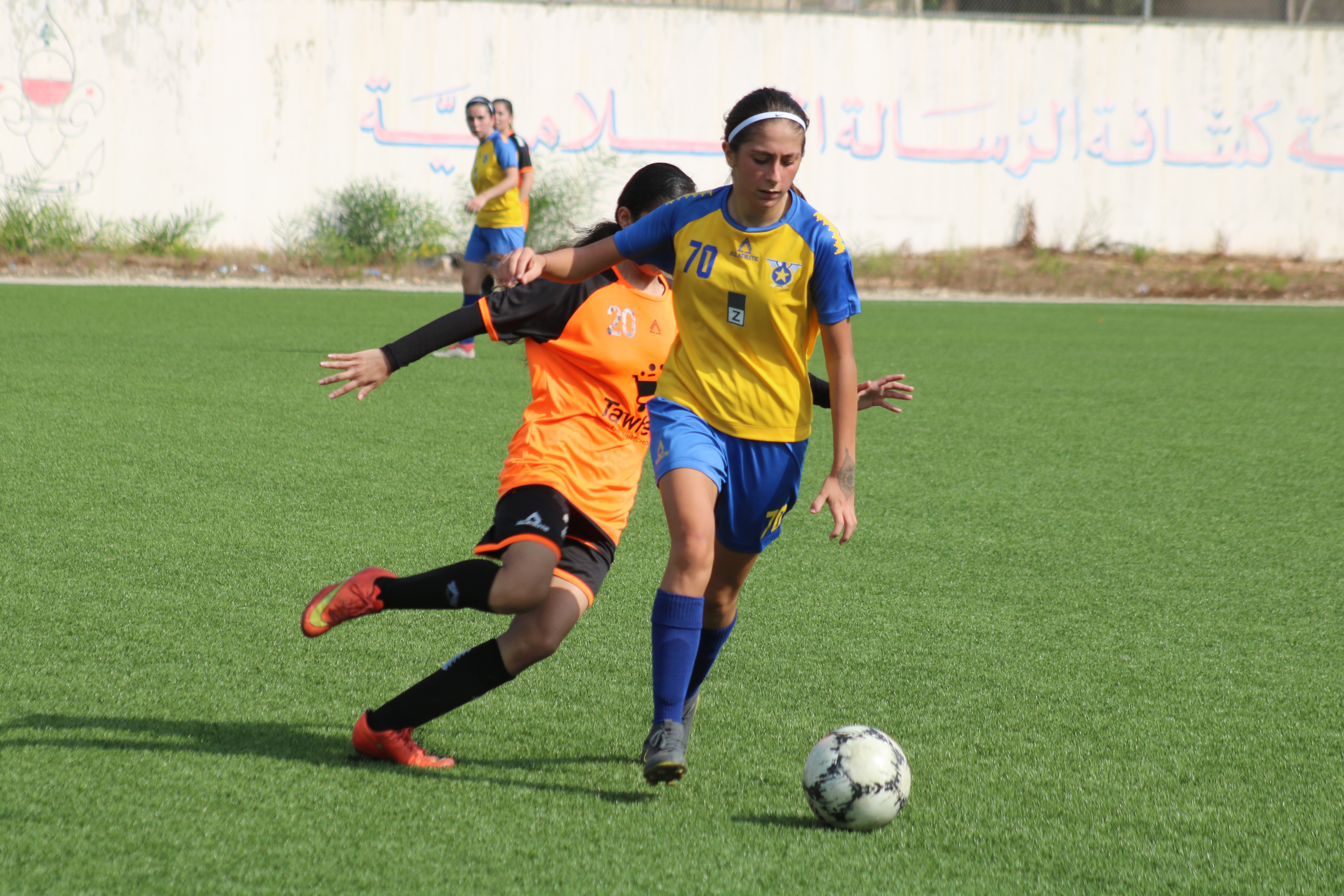
Haidar playing for Safa U19 in 2020

Haidar began her youth career with Akhaa Ahli Aley before joining Safa. She played for Safa's under-19 team during the 2020–21 season before joining the senior team in 2021. She was part of the Safa side that won the 2022 WAFF Women's Clubs Championship. Safa subsequently dissolved its women's football programme in 2022.

=== BFA ===
Haidar joined BFA in 2022. During the 2022–23 season, she primarily played for the club's under-19 side, winning the under-19 league, while also making appearances for the senior team. She scored her first senior goal for BFA in a 10–0 victory over Helium on 25 June 2023.

BFA won the 2023–24 Lebanese Women's Football League without losing a match. Haidar became one of the team's midfield leaders and occasionally wore the captain's armband during the season. She was appointed permanent captain in September 2024, following the departure of Syntia Salha.

== International career ==
Haidar represented Lebanon at under-18 and under-20 level. She was part of the Lebanon under-18 team that won the 2022 WAFF U-18 Girls Championship.

In 2024, Haidar was called up to the Lebanon senior national team in preparation for the WAFF Women's Championship. She received several call-ups without making an appearance. She was subsequently expected to make her senior debut against Iran in October 2024, but the match was cancelled after further ground attacks by the Israel Defense Forces (IDF).

== Style of play ==
Haidar was described as an intelligent midfielder who played a key role in the team's transition from defence to attack. Her coach compared her playing style to that of Sergio Busquets.

== Injury and rehabilitation ==
On 16 November 2024, Haidar was seriously injured during an Israeli airstrike in Chiyah, in the southern suburbs of Beirut. Having originally relocated to Baakline with her family due to the attacks, she had returned to Beirut to train, and was attempting to leave the area after an evacuation order when she was struck on the right side of her head by shrapnel. She suffered severe head injuries, including multiple skull fractures and cerebral bleeding. She was taken to a hospital in Hadath that was then hit by an airstrike. She was transferred to the Saint George Hospital University Medical Center, where she underwent surgery to control the bleeding, and was placed in an induced coma.

A video showing Haidar unconscious and injured after the attack circulated widely on social media in Lebanon. Other social media responses included further calls for FIFA to suspend Israel from international football in response to their invasions, which have injured multiple footballers. Unconfirmed reports on 17 and 18 November claimed that she had died, but BFA clarified that she remained in critical condition. According to The New York Times, Haidar became "a symbol of the war's destruction".

Haidar remained in a coma for several weeks. During her hospitalization, she experienced complications involving the sodium level in her blood and required a feeding tube. Her oxygen support was removed in December 2024, but she subsequently underwent an emergency tracheostomy on 20 December. By early January 2025, she had regained consciousness but was unable to move or speak and rarely responded to sounds around her. She subsequently began a prolonged rehabilitation programme.

By May 2025, Haidar had progressed from being unable to move independently to walking under supervision. She continued to experience physical and neurological effects from her injuries and remained in rehabilitation, with difficulties performing football-related movements. In November 2025, she was reported to be working to regain her independence and football skills.

Her recovery had progressed to walking and running by March 2026. With her playing career interrupted, she began considering coaching as a possible future career. She continued intensive rehabilitation for the effects of her brain injury, expressing a determination to avoid being confined to a wheelchair or dependent on a cane.

== Honours ==
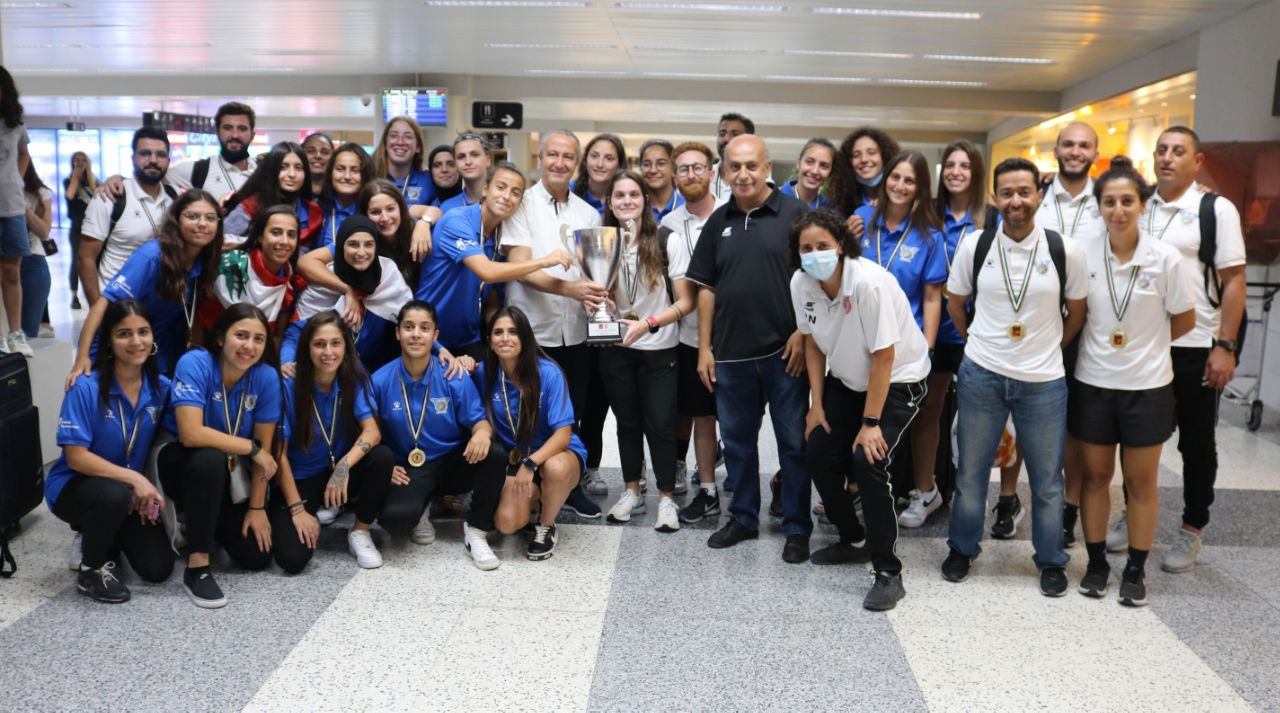
Haidar (bottom row, third from left) with Safa after winning the 2022 WAFF Women's Clubs Championship

Safa

- WAFF Women's Clubs Championship: 2022

BFA

- Lebanese Women's Football League: 2023–24

BFA under-19

- Lebanese Under-19 Women's Football League: 2022–23

Lebanon under-18

- WAFF U-18 Girls Championship: 2022
