= 2023–24 Lebanese Women's Football League =

Football tournament season

Lebanese Women's Football League
- Season: 2023–24
- Dates: 17 March – 11 August 2024
- Champions: BFA; 1st title
- Matches: 100
- Goals: 389 (3.89 per match)
- Top goalscorer: Syntia Salha (40 goals)
- Biggest win: Montada Sour Sakafi 0–15 BFA (23 June 2024)
- Highest scoring: Montada Sour Sakafi 0–15 BFA (23 June 2024); Montada Sour Sakafi 1–14 EFP (28 July 2024)

The 2023–24 Lebanese Women's Football League was the 17th edition of the Lebanese Women's Football League since it was formed in 2008.

On 22 April 2023, Super Girls withdrew after the first matchday. BFA were crowned league champions after finishing first with 18 wins out of 18 matches.

== Regular season ==
Pos	Team	Pld	W	D	L	GF	GA	GD	Pts	Qualification
1	BFA	18	18	0	0	106	4	+102	54	Champions
2	SAS	18	15	0	3	65	14	+51	45	
3	EFP	18	13	0	5	72	27	+45	39	
4	ÓBerytus	18	7	2	9	21	34	−13	23	
5	Helium	18	6	4	8	21	31	−10	22	
6	Akhaa Ahli Aley	18	6	3	9	18	29	−11	21	
7	FC Beirut	18	6	1	11	20	48	−28	19	
8	Salam Zgharta	18	5	2	11	24	49	−25	17	
9	No Limits	18	6	1	11	30	46	−16	19	
10	Montada Sour Sakafi	18	1	1	16	12	107	−95	4	
11	Super Girls (Note: Super Girls withdrew after matchday 1, and all their results were annulled.)	0	0	0	0	0	0	0	0	Withdraw

Source: Global Sports Archive
Rules for classification: 1) Points; 2) Head-to-head points; 3) Head-to-head goal difference; 4) Goal difference; 5) Goals scored; 6) Disciplinary points.

== Season statistics ==
=== Top goalscorers ===
Rank	Player	Club	Goals
1	(Lebanon) Syntia Salha	BFA	40
2	(Lebanon) Yara Bou Rada	EFP	25
3	(Lebanon) Angelina Saade	BFA	20
4	(Ghana) Doreen Copson	BFA	18
5	(Lebanon) Sally Mjarkash	No Limits	13
6	(Lebanon) Lama Abdine	BFA	12
6	(Ghana) Gladys Amfobea	SAS	12
8	(Lebanon) Leah Hachem	SAS	10
8	(Lebanon) Julie Atallah	No Limits	10

=== Most assists ===
Rank	Player	Club	Assists
1	(Lebanon) Lama Abdine	BFA	18
2	(Lebanon) Yara Bou Rada	EFP	12
2	(Ghana) Doreen Copson	BFA	12
4	(Lebanon) Syntia Salha	BFA	11
5	(Lebanon) Mariam Chehab	No Limits	10
5	(Lebanon) Zahraa Assaf	FC Beirut	10
5	(Lebanon) Rachel Nassif	EFP	10
8	(Lebanon) Yasmine Hamdar	ÓBerytus	8
