= 2021–22 Lebanese Women's Football League =

Football tournament season

Lebanese Women's Football League
- Season: 2021–22
- Dates: 10 April – 31 July 2022
- Champions: SAS; 6th title
- Matches: 49
- Goals: 267 (5.45 per match)
- Top goalscorer: Syntia Salha (20 goals)
- Biggest win: EFP 11–0 United Tripoli (24 April 2022); EFP 11–0 Taadod Mazraat Chouf (21 May 2022); BFA 11–0 United Tripoli (3 July 2022); United Tripoli 0–11 EFP (31 July 2022)
- Highest scoring: EFP 11–0 United Tripoli (24 April 2022); EFP 11–0 Taadod Mazraat Chouf (21 May 2022); BFA 11–0 United Tripoli (3 July 2022); United Tripoli 0–11 EFP (31 July 2022)

The 2021–22 Lebanese Women's Football League was the 15th edition of the Lebanese Women's Football League since it was formed in 2008.

It began on 10 April 2022 and ended on 31 July. Eight teams participated, who played each other in a double round-robin tournament. SAS won their sixth league title, after beating defending champions Safa 2–1 on the final matchday.

== League table ==
Pos	Team	Pld	W	D	L	GF	GA	GD	Pts	Qualification
1	SAS	13	11	1	1	45	10	+35	34	Champions
2	Safa	13	10	2	1	59	7	+52	32	
3	EFP	13	8	2	3	61	17	+44	26	
4	BFA	13	7	3	3	45	16	+29	24	
5	Super Girls	13	3	1	9	24	42	−18	10	
6	ÓBerytus	13	3	1	9	25	46	−21	10	
7	Taadod Mazraat Chouf (Note: Taadod Mazraat Chouf withdrew and their matches from the second half of the season were annulled.)	7	1	1	5	4	34	−30	4	Withdraw
8	United Tripoli	13	0	1	12	4	95	−91	1	

Source: Global Sports Archive
Rules for classification: 1) Points; 2) Goal difference; 3) Number of goals scored

== Top goalscorers ==
Rank	Player	Club	Goals
1	(Lebanon) Syntia Salha	Safa	17
2	(Lebanon) Christy Maalouf	EFP	16
3	(Lebanon) Leah Hachem	Safa	13
4	(Lebanon) Mone Linnette Makkawi	Super Girls	12
5	(Lebanon) Yara Srour	BFA	10
6	(Lebanon) Zahraa Assaf	SAS	9
6	(Lebanon) Celine Al Haddad	SAS	9
8	(Lebanon) Christelle Bedran	ÓBerytus	8

== See also ==
- 2021–22 Lebanese Women's Super Cup
