= Myriam Neaimeh =

Lebanese footballer (born 1983)

Personal information
- Full name: Myriam Ghassan Neaimeh
- Date of birth: 28 December 1983 (age 42)
- Place of birth: Lebanon
- Positions: Midfielder; defender

College career
Years	Team	Apps	(Gls)
2010–2011	University of Manchester		

Senior career*
Years	Team	Apps	(Gls)
2007–2009	Ansar		
2009–2010	1. FC Femina		
2012–2015	Newcastle United		
2015–2016	Rutherford		

International career
2006–2007	Lebanon	5+	(0)
Medal record
Women's football
Representing Lebanon
WAFF Women's Championship
Bronze medal – third place	2007
- * Club domestic league appearances and goals

Myriam Ghassan Neaimeh (Arabic: ميريام غسان نعيمه; born 28 December 1983) is a Lebanese former footballer who played as a midfielder or defender.

== Club career ==
Neaimeh began her football career in Lebanon, where she captained the women's team of Ansar. In 2009, she moved to Budapest, Hungary, where she played for 1. FC Femina in the country's top division while pursuing a master's degree in environmental science.

In 2010, she joined the first team of the University of Manchester while studying in England. She signed for Newcastle United on 27 February 2012, becoming the first Lebanese player to join the club's women's team. She played in the FA Women's Premier League, scoring against Guiseley AFC Vixens in October 2014.

In 2015, Neaimeh joined Rutherford, known as the Ravens, in the North East Regional Women's Football League. She helped the club win the Northern Division in the 2015–16 season and reach the Durham County FA Women's Cup final.

== International career ==
Neaimeh represented the Lebanon national team between 2006 and 2007, appearaing in the 2006 Arab Championship and the 2007 WAFF Championship as the team's captain.

== Personal life ==
In 2009, Neaimeh moved to Budapest, Hungary to do a two-year master's in environmental science. She moved to Manchester, England in 2010 to study at the University of Manchester. In November 2011, Neaimeh started working as a researcher on electric vehicles at Newcastle University. In 2015 she worked in partnership with Japanese car manufacturer Nissan. Her work later focused on electric-vehicle charging infrastructure and vehicle-to-grid technology. She became a senior research associate at Newcastle University and a group leader in the Data-Centric Engineering programme at The Alan Turing Institute.

== Honours ==
Ansar

- Lebanese Women's FA Cup: 2008, 2009

Rutherford

- North East Regional Women's Football League Northern Division: 2015–16

Lebanon

- WAFF Women's Championship third place: 2007

== See also ==
- List of Lebanon women's international footballers
