= Nour Noujaim =

Lebanese footballer (born 2004)

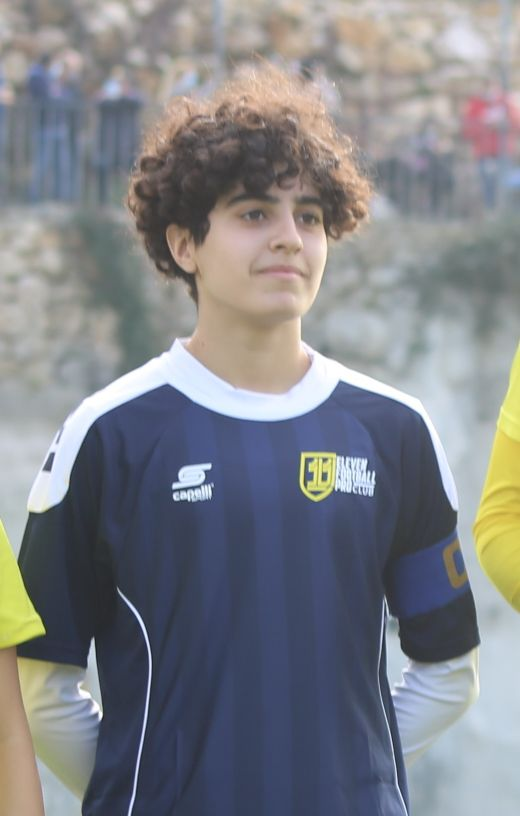
- Noujaim with EFP in 2021

Personal information
- Full name: Nour Fadi Noujaim
- Date of birth: 6 February 2004 (age 22)
- Place of birth: Rabieh, Lebanon
- Height: 1.67 m (5 ft 6 in)
- Position: Defender

Team information
- Current team: Coker Cobras
- Number: 4

Youth career
- 2016–2018: Zouk Mosbeh
- 2018–2019: SAS
- 2019–2021: EFP

College career
Years	Team	Apps	(Gls)
2021–2022	Central Methodist Eagles	0	(0)
2022–	Coker Cobras	32	(1)

Senior career*
Years	Team	Apps	(Gls)
2016–2018	Zouk Mosbeh		
2018–2019	SAS		
2019–2021	EFP		(1)
2022	Iowa Raptors FC		(1)
2023	Vermont Fusion		(0)

International career^{‡}
2018	Lebanon U15		
2018	Lebanon U16	4	(0)
2019–2020	Lebanon U18	4	(0)
2019	Lebanon U19	1	(0)
2021–2025	Lebanon	11	(0)
Medal record
Women's football
Representing Lebanon
WAFF U-18 Girls Championship
Gold medal – first place	2019	U-18 Team
WAFF U-15 Girls Championship
Silver medal – second place	2018	U-15 Team
- * Club domestic league appearances and goals as of 23:17, 15 February 2024 (UTC) ‡ National team caps and goals as of 19 July 2025

Nour Fadi Noujaim (Arabic: نور فادي نجيم; born 6 February 2004) is a Lebanese footballer who plays as a defender for American college team Coker Cobras.

== Club career ==
=== Lebanon ===
Between 2012 and 2016, Noujaim played at youth level in a boy's club. She joined Zouk Mosbeh in 2016, playing for their under-17, under-19 and senior teams until 2018. Noujaim then moved to SAS, playing one year for the under-17, under-19 and senior teams, before joining EFP in 2019, also playing for their youth and senior teams.

=== United States ===
Noujaim played for Central Methodist Eagles, the team of the Central Methodist University. On 28 March 2022, she moved to Iowa Raptors FC in the Women's Premier Soccer League.

In 2022, she joined Coker Cobras, Coker University's team. She was nominated Athlete of the Month in August by the university, and was named to the South Atlantic Conference (SAC) All-Conference Third Team for 2022. In 2023, she was named in the SAC All-Conference Second Team for the 2023 Preseason.

== International career ==
Noujaim represented Lebanon internationally at under-15, under-16, under-18 and under-19 levels. She made her senior debut for Lebanon on 8 April 2021, as a starter in a friendly tournament against Armenia.

== Personal life ==
Noujaim attended the Collège des Sœurs des Saints Cœurs – Beit Chabab. In 2022, she enrolled at Coker University to major in business administration.

== Honours ==
Zouk Mosbeh

- Lebanese Women's Football League: 2017–18
- Lebanese Women's FA Cup: 2016–17, 2017–18
- Lebanese Women's Super Cup: 2017

SAS

- Lebanese Women's Football League: 2018–19
- Lebanese Women's FA Cup: 2018–19
- WAFF Women's Clubs Championship runner-up: 2019

EFP

- Lebanese Women's FA Cup: 2020–21

Lebanon U15

- WAFF U-15 Girls Championship runner-up: 2018

Lebanon U18

- WAFF U-18 Girls Championship: 2019

Individual

- South Atlantic Conference All-Conference Third Team: 2022
- South Atlantic Conference All-Conference Second Team: 2023 Preseason

== See also ==
- List of Lebanon women's international footballers
