= Anabelle Ghabach =

Association football player (born 2005)

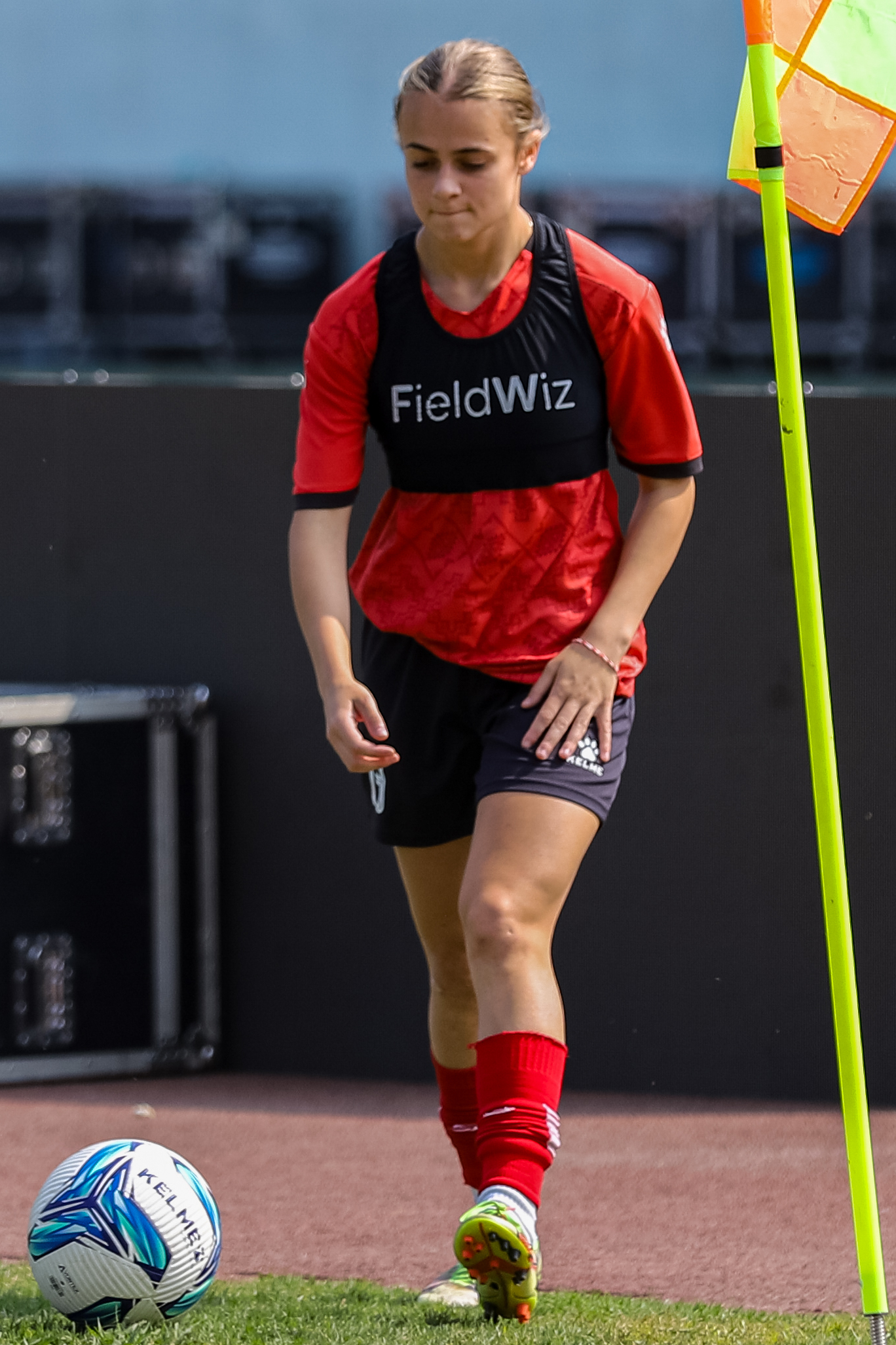
- Ghabach with Lebanon in 2025

Personal information
- Full name: Anabelle Rose Ghabach
- Date of birth: 11 October 2005 (age 21)
- Place of birth: Bankstown, New South Wales, Australia
- Position: Midfielder

Team information
- Current team: Gladesville Ravens

Youth career
- 2017–2021: Football NSW Institute

Senior career*
Years	Team	Apps	(Gls)
2022–2023	Football NSW Institute	7	(0)
2024–2025	APIA Leichhardt	0	(0)
2025–	Gladesville Ravens	0	(0)

International career^{‡}
2025	Lebanon	10	(0)
- * Club domestic league appearances and goals as of 31 August 2024 ‡ National team caps and goals as of 19 July 2025

Anabelle Rose Ghabach (Arabic: أنابيل روز غبش; born 11 October 2005) is a footballer who plays as a midfielder for NPL NSW Women's club Gladesville Ravens. Born in Australia, she has played for the Lebanon national team.

Coming through the youth system, Ghabach made her debut for the Football NSW Institute in 2022, before she tore her anterior cruciate ligament which kept her sidelined for over a year. In 2024, she moved to APIA Leichhardt, then signed for Gladesville Ravens in 2025.

Ghabach was called up for Australia U17 in 2022, before switching allegiance to Lebanon, with whom she made her senior debut in 2025.

== Club career ==
Ghabach was selected for the Football NSW Institute's 13 Girls squad in 2017. She played for Football NSW Institute between 2017 and 2023; in early 2023 she tore her anterior cruciate ligament and was sidelined for over a year. Ghabach moved to APIA Leichhardt ahead of the 2024 NPL NSW season, and returned from her injury in May 2024.

She joined Gladesville Ravens mid-2025 season. She was part of the club's under-23 side that finished runner-up in the New South Wales competition.

== International career ==
She was subsequently selected for several training camps with the Junior Matildas, including camps in March and April 2022.

In March 2021, Ghabach was called up for a training camp for Australia U17 ahead of the 2022 AFC U-17 Women's Asian Cup qualification. She was called up twice more, in March 2022 and April 2022.

Ghabach was called up to the Lebanon national team in February 2025, ahead of the 2025 International Women's Championship in Nepal. She made her full international debut against Myanmar, in a 3–1 defeat on 17 February.

== Career statistics ==
=== Club ===
As of match played 2 August 2026

Club	Season	League			Other		Total	
Club	Season	Division	Apps	Goals	Apps	Goals	Apps	Goals
Football NSW Institute	2022	NPL NSW	7	0	—		7	0
Football NSW Institute	2023	NPL NSW	0	0	—		0	0
Football NSW Institute	Total		7	0	0	0	7	0
APIA Leichhardt	2024	NPL NSW	0	0	1 (Note: Appearance in Sapphire Cup)	0	1	0
APIA Leichhardt	2025	NPL NSW	0	0	—		0	0
APIA Leichhardt	Total		0	0	1	0	1	0
Gladesville Ravens	2025	NPL NSW	0	0	—		0	0
Gladesville Ravens	2026	NPL NSW	0	0	—		0	0
Gladesville Ravens	Total		0	0	0	0	0	0
Career total			7	0	1	0	8	0

== See also ==
- List of Lebanon women's international footballers
