= Sherin Hasno =

Footballer (born 2007)

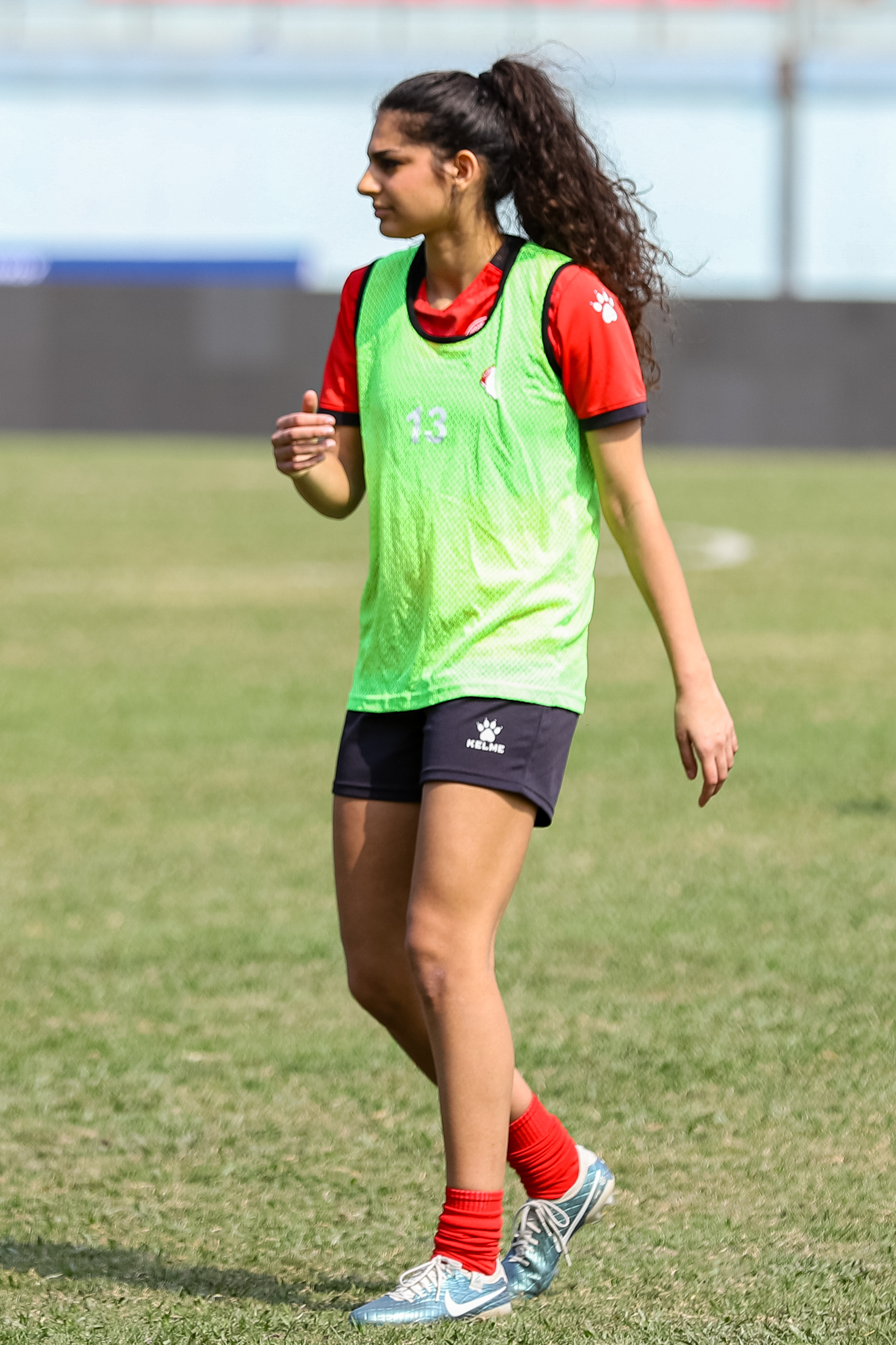
- Hasno with Lebanon in 2025

Personal information
- Full name: Sherin Bilal Hasno
- Date of birth: 25 March 2007 (age 19)
- Place of birth: Herlev, Denmark
- Position: Forward

Team information
- Current team: HB Køge U19

Youth career
- HB Køge
- –2024: Brøndby IF
- 2024–: HB Køge

International career^{‡}
| Years | Team | Apps | (Gls) |
| 2024–2025 | Lebanon U18 | | (5) |
| 2024–2025 | Lebanon U19 | 2 | (0) |
| 2025 | Lebanon U20 | 3 | (2) |
| 2025 | Lebanon | 5 | (0) |
Medal record
Women's football
Representing Lebanon
WAFF U-18 Girls Championship
| Silver medal – second place | 2024 | U-18 Team |
- ‡ National team caps and goals as of 10 August 2025

Sherin Bilal Hasno (Arabic: شيرين بلال حسنو; born 25 March 2007) is a footballer who plays as a forward for the under-19 team of Danish club HB Køge. Born in Denmark, she has played for the Lebanon national team.

== Club career ==
Hasno began playing football at HB Køge, where she featured for the club's youth teams. She later joined Brøndby IF, playing for their under-19 team during the 2023–24 season. In summer 2024, she returned to HB Køge, where she played for the club's under-19 side.

== International career ==
=== Youth ===
Hasno was called up to the Lebanon U19 team in April 2024, for two friendly games against Jordan, and in October 2024, for a training camp. In December 2024, Hasno played for Lebanon U18 at the 2024 WAFF U-18 Girls Championship. She scored in a 1–1 draw against Palestine on 4 December. Lebanon finished as runners-up in the tournament.

In April 2025, Hasno played at the 2025 UEFA Women's U-18 Friendship Cup in Turkey. She scored a hat-trick in Lebanon's 4–1 victory over Jamaica. She finished the tournament as its leading goalscorer, with three goals.

Hasno also represented Lebanon in the 2026 AFC U-20 Women's Asian Cup qualifiers in August 2025. She scored in Lebanon's 1–0 win over Cambodia on 6 August and in a 2–1 victory over Syria two days later.

In October 2025, Hasno was part of the Lebanese youth side that played two friendlies against Malta U19. She scored Lebanon's equalising goal from a penalty in a 4–2 win on 22 October and also appeared in the second match, which ended in a 1–1 draw.

=== Senior ===
Hasno received her first call-up to the senior Lebanon team in July 2024 for a training camp. She made her senior international debut on 17 February 2025, coming on as a substitute in a 3–1 defeat to Myanmar at the 2025 International Women's Championship in Nepal. She subsequently appeared in the 2026 AFC Women's Asian Cup qualifiers in July 2025.

== Honours ==
Lebanon U18

- WAFF U-18 Girls Championship runner-up: 2024

== See also ==
- List of Lebanon women's international footballers
