= 2022–23 Lebanese Women's Football League =

Football tournament season

Lebanese Women's Football League
- Season: 2022–23
- Dates: 17 April – 16 August 2023
- Champions: SAS; 7th title
- Matches: 42
- Goals: 215 (5.12 per match)
- Top goalscorer: Syntia Salha (29 goals)
- Biggest win: EFP 11–0 ÓBerytus (17 April 2023); EFP 11–0 FC Beirut (30 April 2023)
- Highest scoring: EFP 11–0 ÓBerytus (17 April 2023); EFP 11–0 FC Beirut (30 April 2023)

The 2022–23 Lebanese Women's Football League was the 16th edition of the Lebanese Women's Football League since it was formed in 2008.

It began on 17 April 2023, and ended on 16 August 2023. After Jabal and Super Girls withdrew, six teams participated in the regular season, held in a double round-robin tournament. The top four-placed teams qualified to the Final four fase, also held in a double round-robin format. SAS won their seventh league title, a joint record with Sadaka.

== Regular season ==
Pos	Team	Pld	W	D	L	GF	GA	GD	Pts	Qualification
1	SAS	10	9	1	0	46	6	+40	28	Qualification to the final four
2	EFP	10	7	1	2	49	7	+42	22	Qualification to the final four
3	BFA	10	7	0	3	48	15	+33	21	Qualification to the final four
4	Helium	10	3	0	7	13	27	−14	9 (Note: Head-to-head results: ÓBerytus 1–0 Helium; ÓBerytus 1–2 Helium)	Qualification to the final four
5	ÓBerytus	10	3	0	7	8	49	−41	9	
6	FC Beirut	10	0	0	10	0	60	−60	0	
7	Jabal (Note: Super Girls withdrew after matchday 1, while Jabal withdrew after matchday 5. All their results were annulled.)	0	0	0	0	0	0	0	0	Withdraw
8	Super Girls	0	0	0	0	0	0	0	0	Withdraw

Source: Global Sports Archive
Rules for classification: 1) Points; 2) Head-to-head points; 3) Head-to-head goal difference; 4) Goal difference; 5) Goals scored; 6) Disciplinary points.

== Final four ==
Pos	Team	Pld	W	D	L	GF	GA	GD	Pts	Qualification
1	SAS	6	5	1	0	17	4	+13	16	Champions
2	BFA	6	3	2	1	20	7	+13	11	
3	EFP	6	2	1	3	13	12	+1	7	
4	Helium	6	0	0	6	1	28	−27	0	

Source: Global Sports Archive
Rules for classification: 1) Points; 2) Head-to-head points; 3) Head-to-head goal difference; 4) Goal difference; 5) Goals scored; 6) Disciplinary points.

== Season statistics ==
=== Top goalscorers ===
Rank	Player	Club	Goals
1	(Lebanon) Syntia Salha	BFA	29
2	(Lebanon) Christy Maalouf	EFP	13
2	(Lebanon) Yara Srour	SAS	13
4	(Lebanon) Lama Abdine	BFA	12
5	(Lebanon) Yara Bou Rada	EFP	11
6	(Lebanon) Samira Awad	SAS	10
7	(Lebanon) Hanin Tamim	SAS	9
7	(Lebanon) Sophie Fayad	EFP	9

=== Most assists ===
Rank	Player	Club	Assists
1	(Lebanon) Lama Abdine	BFA	17
2	(Lebanon) Marie-Therese Tikli	BFA	12
3	(Lebanon) Zeina Abi Faraj	BFA	8
3	(Lebanon) Zahraa Assaf	SAS	8
5	(Lebanon) Rana Al Mokdad	SAS	7
5	(Lebanon) Sophie Fayad	EFP	7
5	(Lebanon) Syntia Salha	BFA	7
5	(Lebanon) Samira Awad	SAS	7
