= Rayane Rachid =

Lebanese footballer (born 1994)

Personal information
- Date of birth: 28 July 1994 (age 32)
- Place of birth: Lebanon
- Position: Midfielder

Senior career*
Years	Team	Apps	(Gls)
–2019	Zouk Mosbeh		
2019–2020	Nejmeh		
2021	Al-Baladi (futsal)		
2022	BFA		
2023–2024	FC Le Parc (futsal)		

International career
2013–2015	Lebanon	6	(0)
- Lebanon (futsal)
- * Club domestic league appearances and goals

Rayane Rachid (Arabic: ريان رشيد; born 28 July 1994) is a Lebanese former footballer and futsal player.

== Early life ==
Rachid was born on 28 July 1994. Born in Lebanon, she is the daughter of Lebanese footballer Ali Rachid.

== Club career ==
Rachid played for Lebanese side Zouk Mosbeh, helping the club win the league title. Following her stint there, she signed for Lebanese side Nejmeh in 2019.

Subsequently, she signed for Iraqi futsal side Al-Baladi in 2021, before signing for Lebanese side BFA in 2022. In 2023, she signed for Swiss futsal side FC Le Parc, where she six goals in her first four appearances.

== International career ==
Rachid is a Lebanon international. In May 2018, she played for the Lebanon national futsal team at the 2018 AFC Women's Futsal Championship.

Lebanese newspaper Al Binaa wrote in 2021 that she was "one of the most prominent players who have shone in the fields of [Lebanese] women’s football".

== See also ==
- List of Lebanon women's international footballers
