= Nathaline Gilinguirian =

Lebanese footballer (born 1986)

Personal information
- Full name: Nathaline Krikor Gilinguirian
- Date of birth: 12 April 1986 (age 40)
- Place of birth: Aleppo, Syria
- Position: Goalkeeper

Team information
- Current team: BFA (goalkeeper coach)

Senior career*
| Years | Team | Apps | (Gls) |
| 2012 | Shabab Arabi | | |
| 2017 | SAS | | |
| 2018 | Zouk Mosbeh | | |
| 2018–2022 | BFA | | |

International career
| 2018 | Lebanon (futsal) | | |
| 2010–2011 | Lebanon | 3+ | (0) |

Managerial career
- 2018–: BFA (goalkeeper)
- * Club domestic league appearances and goals

Nathaline Krikor Gilinguirian (Arabic: ناتالين كركور جلنكريان; born 12 April 1986) is a Lebanese football coach and former football and futsal player. She represented Lebanon internationally in both football and futsal as a goalkeeper.

Gilinguirian played for several clubs in the Lebanese Women's Football League, namely Shabab Arabi, SAS, Zouk Mosbeh, and BFA, retiring in 2022. She played for the Lebanon national team between 2010 and 2011, appearing in the 2010 Arabia Women's Cup and the 2014 AFC Women's Asian Cup qualification.

After her retirement as a player, Gilinguirian became a physiotherapist and goalkeeper coach for various youth and club teams.

== Club career ==
Gilinguirian played football and futsal for Shabab Arabi in 2012, SAS in 2017, and Zouk Mosbeh in 2018. She played for Beirut Football Academy (BFA) between 2018 and 2022.

== International career ==
Gilinguirian played for Lebanon in the 2010 Arabia Women's Cup, and the qualifiers for the 2014 AFC Women's Asian Cup. She also represented the national futsal team in the 2018 AFC Women's Futsal Championship.

== Managerial career ==
Gilinguirian was the physiotherapist of the women's national under-15 team at the 2018 WAFF U-15 Girls Championship. In August 2018, she was appointed goalkeeper coach and physiotherapist of BFA. In 2019, she was the physiotherapist of the women's national under-18 team.

In March 2023, Gilinguirian was appointed to the executive committee of the Lebanese Football Association, pending the election of a female member at the association's next general assembly. She later withdrew from the election held in February 2024, which was won by Paula Faroun Rizk.

In April 2024, Gilinguirian participated in the Asian Football Confederation President's Travelling Fellows programme for Football Medicine, hosted by Aspetar in Qatar, as a physiotherapist representing the Lebanese Football Association.

== See also ==
- List of Lebanon women's international footballers
