= Sandy Abi-Elias =

Association football player (born 1997)

Personal information
- Full name: Sandy Patricia Abi-Elias
- Date of birth: 10 May 1997 (age 29)
- Place of birth: Isleworth, England
- Position: Forward

Youth career
- 2007–2011: Fulham
- 2011–2012: AFC Wimbledon
- 2012–2013: Arsenal
- 2013–2014: Chelsea

Senior career*
| Years | Team | Apps | (Gls) |
| 2014–2015 | Watford | | |
| 2015–2016 | Bristol Academy | | |
| 2016–2017 | Swindon Town | | |
| 2017–2018 | Keynsham Town | | |

International career
| 2018 | Lebanon | 2 | (0) |
- * Club domestic league appearances and goals

Sandy Patricia Abi-Elias (Arabic: ساندي ابي الياس; born 10 May 1997) is a former footballer who played as a forward. Born in England, Abi-Elias played for the Lebanon national team in 2018.

Abi-Elias played for various youth clubs in England, most notably Arsenal and Chelsea. She made her senior debut in 2014 with Watford, before playing for Bristol Academy, Swindon Town, and Keynsham Town.

== Club career ==
Abi-Elias started her youth career at Fulham in 2007, before moving to AFC Wimbledon in 2011. After one year, Abi-Elias moved to Arsenal, winning the 2012–13 FA Girls Youth Cup, before joining Chelsea in 2013, staying there one year.

In 2014 Abi-Elias began her senior career at Watford, playing during the 2014–15 season. In 2015 she moved to Bristol Academy, before joining Swindon Town in 2016. After one season at the club, Abi-Elias moved to Keynsham Town, playing there during the 2017–18 season.

== International career ==
Abi-Elias made her senior international debut for Lebanon on 28 November 2018, in an AFC Women's Olympic qualifying match against Iran; Lebanon lost 8–0.

== Personal life ==
Born in Isleworth, England, Abi-Elias studied at Teddington School in Teddington, London between 2007 and 2013. In 2011, while in Year 9, Abi-Elias was awarded Football Player of the Year (Girl). Between 2013 and 2015, Abi-Elias studied BTEC Level 3 Sport and Exercise at Kingston College, while playing for the college's women's football academy. In 2015 Abi-Elias studied at the University of Bath, with a BA in Sport and Social Sciences.

== Honours ==
Arsenal

- FA Girls Youth Cup: 2012–13

== See also ==
- List of Lebanon women's international footballers
