= Jo-Anne Beaumier =

Lebanese footballer (born 1996)

Personal information
- Full name: Jo-Anne Claude Beaumier
- Date of birth: 10 April 1996 (age 30)
- Place of birth: LaSalle, Quebec, Canada
- Position: Defender

Team information
- Current team: Révolution FC

Senior career*
Years	Team	Apps	(Gls)
2018–2019	Zouk Mosbeh		(1)
2019–2022	BFA		(6)
2022–	Révolution FC		

International career^{‡}
2018	Lebanon (futsal)	3	(0)
2018–2021	Lebanon	7	(0)
- * Club domestic league appearances and goals as of 22 July 2021 ‡ National team caps and goals as of 13:41, 24 October 2021 (UTC)

Jo-Anne Claude Beaumier (Arabic: جو ان كلود بومييه; born 10 April 1996) is a footballer who plays as a defender for Canadian club Révolution FC. Born in Canada, she has played for the Lebanon national team.

== Club career ==
Beaumier began her senior career in Lebanon with Zouk Mosbeh, before moving to Beirut Football Academy (BFA) in 2019. She competed with BFA in the Lebanese Women's Football League, scoring two goals in six league appearances during the 2020–21 season. In 2022, Beaumier moved back to Canada, where she continued her club career with Révolution FC.

== International career ==
=== Futsal ===
Beaumier was named in the Lebanon national futsal team's squad for the 2018 AFC Women's Futsal Championship, held in Thailand. She featured in Lebanon's group-stage fixture against Japan on 3 May 2018, starting in defence as her side suffered a 5–1 defeat.

=== Football ===
Beaumier made her debut for the Lebanon national team in November 2018, during the qualifying tournament for the 2020 AFC Women's Olympic Qualifying Tournament. She later represented Lebanon at the 2021 Arab Women's Cup, where she made two appearances during the competition.

In October 2021, Beaumier featured in all three of Lebanon's matches in the qualifying competition for the 2022 AFC Women's Asian Cup, starting in each fixture against Myanmar, the United Arab Emirates and Guam. Lebanon recorded victories over the UAE and Guam, winning 1–0 and 3–0 respectively, but ultimately failed to secure qualification for the final tournament.

== Personal life ==
Beaumier was born in Canada to a Canadian father and a Lebanese mother. She acquired Lebanese citizenship through naturalization to become eligible to represent Lebanon in international competition.

== See also ==
- List of Lebanon women's international footballers
