= Israa Toufaily =

Lebanese footballer (born 2002)

Personal information
- Full name: Israa Abdallah Toufaily
- Date of birth: 27 May 2002 (age 24)
- Position: Forward

Youth career
- Southern Stars

Senior career*
Years	Team	Apps	(Gls)
–2021	Southern Stars		
2021	→ Primo (loan)	4	(5)

International career
2021	Lebanon	1	(0)
- * Club domestic league appearances and goals

Israa Abdallah Toufaily (Arabic: إسراء عبد الله طفيلي; born 27 May 2002) is a Lebanese football coach and former player who played as a forward.

Toufaily played for Southern Stars and Primo at club level. Internationally, she played for the Lebanon national team at the 2021 Arab Women's Cup, making one appearance. After her playing career, she became involved in the technical staff of the Lebanon women's national under-20 team, first as an administrator in 2024, then as the assistant coach in 2025.

== Club career ==
In 2020, Toufaily played for Southern Stars at under-19 level. She scored a brace in the opening matchday of the season, in a 12–1 win over Primo. In the second matchday, she scored a hat-trick against Helium, helping her side win 14–0.

In May 2021, Primo announced the signing of Toufaily on loan from Southern Stars for the 2020–21 season. She made her Lebanese Women's Football League debut for the side on 23 May, in a 15–0 defeat to SAS. Her first goals came on 3 June, in the form of a hat-trick against Sakafi Chhim; despite the goals, her side lost 11–3. She scored two more goals that season, being the lone goalscorer of her side in a 7–2 defeat to Super Girls.

== International career ==
Toufaily received her first call-up to the Lebanon national team in August 2021, ahead of the 2021 Arab Women's Cup held in Egypt. She made her debut on 30 August, as a second-half substitute in a 5–1 win over Sudan. The match proved to be her only competitive cap for Lebanon.

== Managerial career ==
In April 2024, after her playing career, Toufaily was included in the delegation of the Lebanon women's national under-20 team as an administrator, ahead of a training camp in Amman, Jordan that included two friendly games against Jordan. One year later, in July 2025, she was included in the under-20s technical staff as the assistant coach of the team for the 2026 AFC U-20 Women's Asian Cup qualifiers in Yinchuan, China.

== Personal life ==
In 2020, Toufaily enrolled to the Lebanese University's faculty of education in physical and sports education.

== See also ==
- List of Lebanon women's international footballers
