= Evelina El Haddad =

Lebanese footballer (born 2005)

Personal information
- Full name: Evelina Ghassan El Haddad
- Date of birth: 30 April 2005 (age 21)
- Place of birth: Kharkiv, Ukraine
- Position: Midfielder

Team information
- Current team: Paris SO Cœur

Youth career
- EFP

Senior career*
Years	Team	Apps	(Gls)
2020–2023	EFP	27	(11)
2023–	Paris SO Cœur (Note: GPSO 92 Issy changed its name to Paris SO Cœur in 2025.)		

International career^{‡}
2019	Lebanon U15		
2022	Lebanon U18		(1)
2021–2022	Lebanon	9	(0)
Medal record
Women's football
Representing Lebanon
WAFF Women's Championship
Silver medal – second place	2022
WAFF U-18 Girls Championship
Gold medal – first place	2022	U-18 Team
WAFF U-15 Girls Championship
Gold medal – first place	2019	U-15 Team
- * Club domestic league appearances and goals ‡ National team caps and goals as of 17:46, 3 September 2022 (UTC)

Evelina Ghassan El Haddad (Arabic: ايفلينا غسان الحداد; born 30 April 2005), also known as Liam Haddad, is a footballer who plays as a midfielder. Born in Ukraine, she has played for the Lebanon national team.

El Haddad began her career in 2020 at EFP, before moving to France in 2023 to play for Paris SO Cœur. She participated internationally for Lebanon at youth level, before making her senior appearance at the 2021 Arab Women's Cup, and helping Lebanon finish runners-up at the 2022 WAFF Women's Championship.

== Early life ==
Haddad was born in Kharkiv, Ukraine, to a Ukrainian mother and a Lebanese father. Haddad lived in Ukraine until the age of two, when the family moved to Lebanon, and holds Ukrainian citizenship. In 2024, Haddad was living and studying in Paris, France.

== Club career ==
Haddad played for Eleven Football Pro (EFP) in Lebanon, where the team won the 2020 under-15 girls' league title. Haddad scored in the final match of the competition, a 2–1 defeat to Southern Stars, which nevertheless secured EFP the championship on goal difference. In May 2021, Haddad was the top scorer in the Lebanese under-19 girls' league with 30 goals, as EFP won the championship after defeating Stars Association for Sports (SAS) 4–2 in the final. Haddad continued to play for EFP in the 2022–23 season.

Haddad moved to France in 2023 and joined GPSO 92 Issy. Haddad subsequently appeared for the club after they changed their name to Paris SO Cœur.

== International career ==
Haddad represented Lebanon at the 2019 WAFF U-15 Girls Championship in Jordan, which Lebanon won. In 2022, Haddad was part of the Lebanon under-18 team that won the 2022 WAFF U-18 Girls Championship.

Haddad made a senior international debut for Lebanon on 24 August 2021, appearing as a substitute in a 0–0 draw against Tunisia at the 2021 Arab Women's Cup. Haddad also featured in the 2022 AFC Women's Asian Cup qualification and the 2022 WAFF Women's Championship, where Lebanon finished as runners-up.

== Personal life ==
El Haddad attended the Collège de la Sainte Famille Française in Jounieh, Lebanon.

== Honours ==
Lebanon U15

- WAFF U-15 Girls Championship: 2019

Lebanon U18

- WAFF U-18 Girls Championship: 2022

Lebanon

- WAFF Women's Championship runner-up: 2022

== See also ==
- List of Lebanon women's international footballers
