= Iowa Raptors FC =

American soccer team

- Full name: Iowa Raptors FC
- Founded: 2020
- Stadium: Alliant Energy PowerHouse
- General Manager: Carlos Taylor
- League: UPSL and MWPL (men's); WPSL (women's); Major Arena Soccer League 2 (indoor)
- Website: https://www.iowaraptorsfc.com/
Home colors	Away colors

Iowa Raptors FC are a soccer club based in Cedar Rapids, Iowa, United States. They were established in 2019 as a men's team, and formed their women's team in 2021.

Their men's team compete in the Midwest Division of United Premier Soccer League (UPSL) and in the Midwest Premier League. They began play in the 2021 UPSL season playing at Prairie High School's stadium. They had initially been set to join USL League Two for 2021, before switching to the UPSL. The men's team won the 2020 Heartland Super Cup.

Iowa Raptors FC also has a women's team, competing in the Women's Premier Soccer League since the 2022 season.

Since the fall of 2022, Iowa Raptors have had an indoor team that competes as members of the Major Arena Soccer League 2.

In their inaugural season, the club won the MASL2 North Division and their MASL2 semifinal, before falling to Chihuahua Savage II in the MASL2 Championship Final.

== Honors ==
=== Outdoor ===
Heartland Super Cup (2020)

=== Indoor ===
MASL2 Runners-Up (2022-23)
