= Julie Atallah =

Lebanese footballer (born 2005)

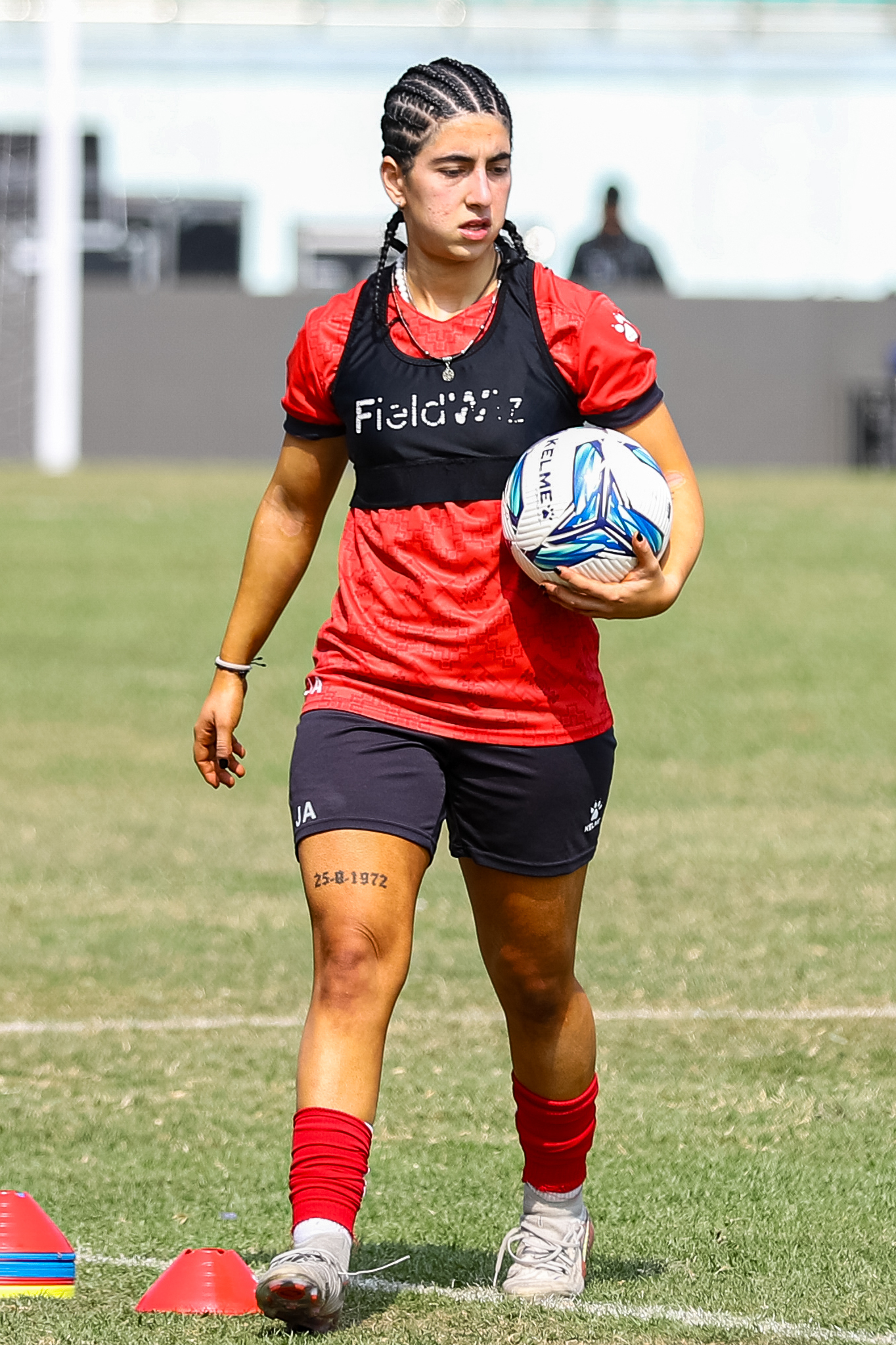
- Atallah training with Lebanon in 2025

Personal information
- Full name: Julie Elie Atallah
- Date of birth: 28 July 2005 (age 21)
- Place of birth: Paris, France
- Position: Defender

Team information
- Current team: No Limits
- Number: 14

Youth career
- –2020: EFP
- 2020–2021: CA Paris 14

Senior career*
| Years | Team | Apps | (Gls) |
| 2021–2023 | EFP | 25 | (5) |
| 2023 | GPSO 92 Issy | 2 | (0) |
| 2023–2024 | BFA | 0 | (0) |
| 2024 | No Limits | 12 | (11) |
| 2024–2025 | FCPSL | 1 | (0) |
| 2025– | No Limits | 2 | (0) |

International career^{‡}
| 2019 | Lebanon U15 | | |
| 2023 | Lebanon U20 | 6 | (1) |
| 2021–2025 | Lebanon | 14 | (0) |
Medal record
Women's football
Representing Lebanon
WAFF Women's Championship
| Silver medal – second place | 2022 |
WAFF U-15 Girls Championship
| Gold medal – first place | 2019 | U-15 Team |
- * Club domestic league appearances and goals as of 4 May 2025 ‡ National team caps and goals as of 23:37, 30 March 2025 (UTC)

Julie Elie Atallah (Arabic: جولي ايلي عطالله; born 28 July 2005) is a Lebanese footballer who plays as a defender for Lebanese club No Limits. Born in France, she has played for the Lebanon national team.

== Early life ==
Atallah began playing football with her brother and his friends in her local area, despite initial opposition from her family. She initially played futsal for over a year before transitioning to traditional football. Starting as a striker, she later shifted to a defensive position.

== Club career ==
A youth product of EFP, Atallah helped her team lift the 2019–20 U15 league title. Her performances attracted attention during EFP's participation in the 2018 U15 Paris Cup, where French club CA Paris 14 expressed interest in her. In September 2020, at just 15 years old, she joined the Parisian club's under-18 team.

Atallah made her debut for FCPSL in the Regional 2 on 2 February 2025, coming on at half time in a 2–1 win against CS Lagnieu.

== International career ==
Atallah represented Lebanon at various youth levels, winning the 2019 WAFF U-15 Girls Championship with Lebanon U15. She later played for Lebanon U20 in the 2024 AFC U-20 Women's Asian Cup qualification, contributing to her team qualifying to the second round.

She made her senior debut for Lebanon during the 2022 WAFF Women's Championship, helping her country claim second place. She was called up to the 2024 WAFF Women's Championship.

== Honours ==
No Limits

- Lebanese Women's Football League: 2025–26

Lebanon U15

- WAFF U-15 Girls Championship: 2019

Lebanon

- WAFF Women's Championship runner-up: 2022

== See also ==
- List of Lebanon women's international footballers
