= Nathalie Matar =

Lebanese footballer (born 1995)

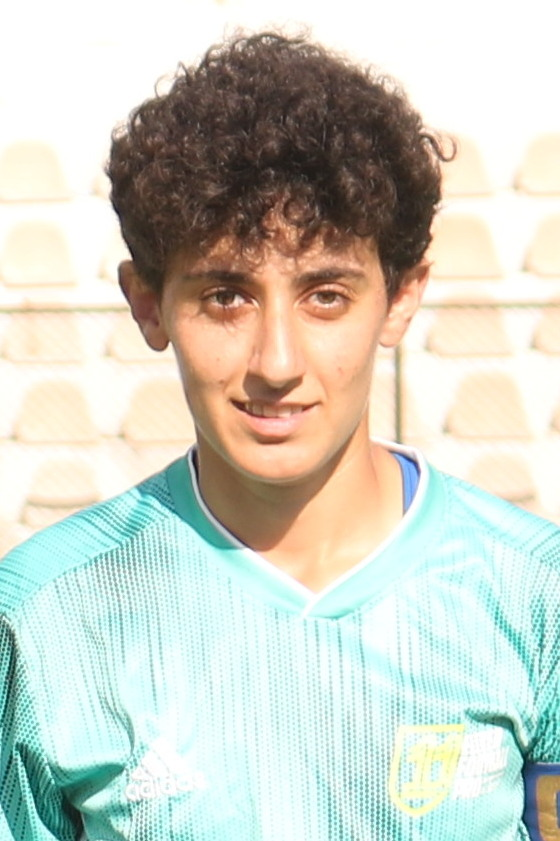
- Matar with EFP in 2021

Personal information
- Full name: Nathalie Georges Matar
- Date of birth: 20 September 1995 (age 31)
- Place of birth: Qaa, Lebanon
- Height: 1.70 m (5 ft 7 in)
- Position: Midfielder

Team information
- Current team: VGA Saint-Maur
- Number: 23

Senior career*
| Years | Team | Apps | (Gls) |
| 2018–2019 | Zouk Mosbeh | | (3) |
| 2019–2022 | EFP | 22+ | (20) |
| 2022–2023 | Grand Calais Pascal | 5 | (0) |
| 2023 | Stade Portelois | 11 | (5) |
| 2023–2025 | USPSO | 41 | (5) |
| 2025– | VGA Saint-Maur | 1 | (0) |

International career^{‡}
| 2018 | Lebanon (futsal) | 5 | (0) |
| 2015–2025 | Lebanon | 37 | (0) |
Medal record
Women's football
Representing Lebanon
WAFF Women's Championship
| Silver medal – second place | 2022 |
- * Club domestic league appearances and goals as of 21 September 2025 ‡ National team caps and goals as of 19 July 2025

Nathalie Georges Matar (Arabic: ناتالي جورج مطر; born 20 September 1995) is a Lebanese footballer who plays as a midfielder for French club VGA Saint-Maur.

== Club career ==
Matar began playing in the Lebanese Women's Football League aged 15, in 2010.

In 2022 Matar moved to France to resume her studies, joining Régional 1 Féminine (fourth division) club Grand Calais Pascal on 14 July 2022. She joined Stade Portelois on 26 January 2023, before moving to USPSO on 8 July 2023. In July 2025, Matar moved to newly promoted Division 3 side VGA Saint-Maur, joining national team teammate Christy Maalouf. She played one game in the 2025–26 Division 3 season.

== International career ==
Matar was part of the Lebanon national team squad that participated in the 2021 Arab Women's Cup in Egypt. She was called up to represent Lebanon at the 2022 WAFF Women's Championship, helping her side finish runners-up. She was called up to the 2024 WAFF Women's Championship.

On 5 April 2025, Matar made her 30th international cap for Lebanon alongside Syntia Salha, breaking Rana Al Mokdad's previous record of 29.

== Honours ==
Lebanon

- WAFF Women's Championship runner-up: 2022

== See also ==
- List of Lebanon women's international footballers
