= Syntia Salha =

Lebanese footballer (born 2003)

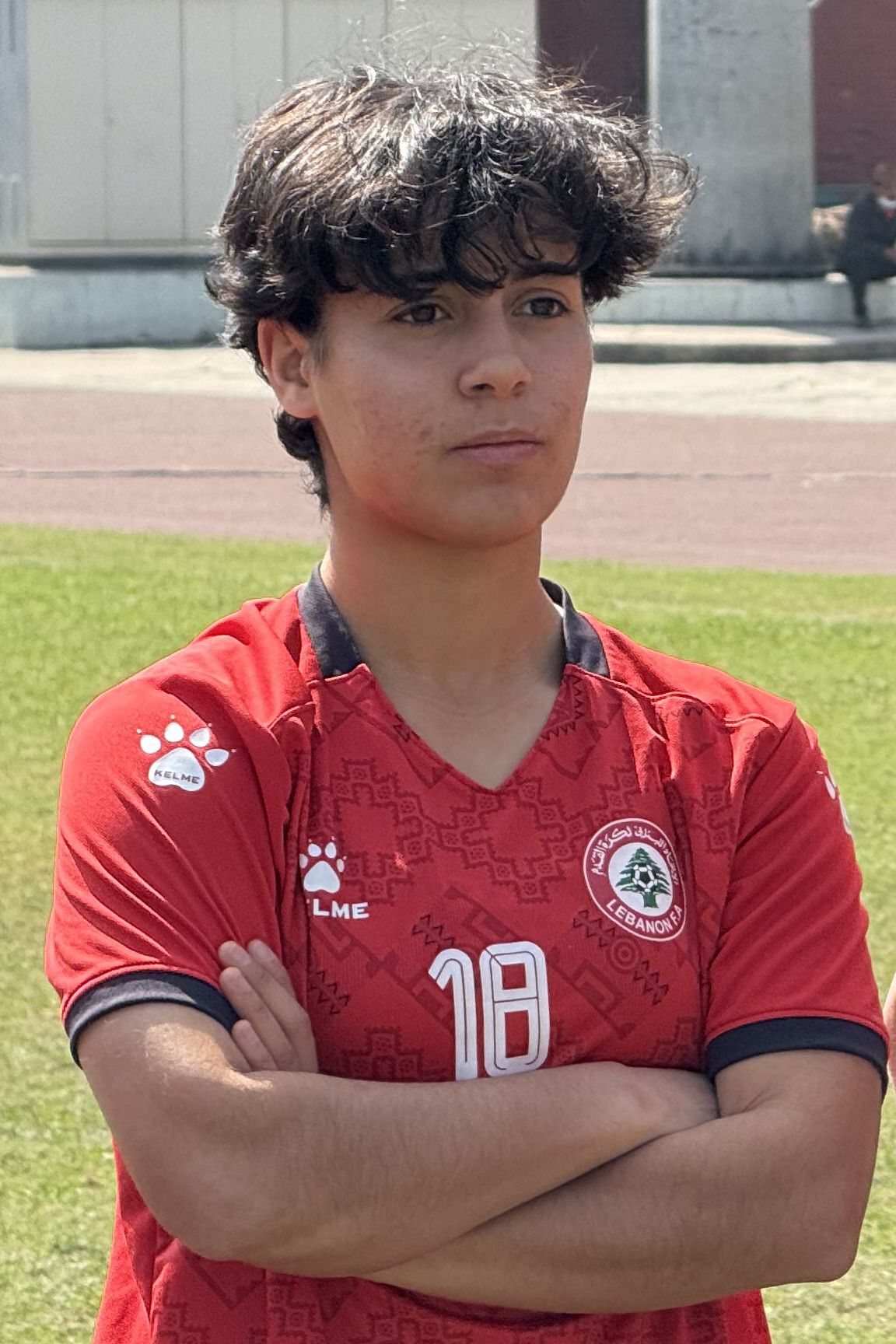
- Salha with Lebanon in 2025

Personal information
- Full name: Syntia Hikmat Salha
- Date of birth: 12 January 2003 (age 23)
- Place of birth: Ras el-Matn, Lebanon
- Positions: Winger; midfielder

Team information
- Current team: Xylofagou

Youth career
- Akhaa Ahli Aley

Senior career*
Years	Team	Apps	(Gls)
2016–2020	Akhaa Ahli Aley	46	(30)
2020–2022	Safa	23	(33)
2022–2024	BFA	31	(69)
2024–2026	Lakatamia	26	(8)
2025	→ BFA (loan)	2	(2)
2026–	Xylofagou	3	(0)

International career^{‡}
2018	Lebanon U15		(2)
2018	Lebanon U16	4	(2)
2019	Lebanon U18		(1)
2019	Lebanon U19	2	(0)
2021–	Lebanon	41	(9)
Medal record
Women's football
Representing Lebanon
WAFF Women's Championship
Silver medal – second place	2022
WAFF U-18 Girls Championship
Gold medal – first place	2019	U-18 Team
WAFF U-15 Girls Championship
Silver medal – second place	2018	U-15 Team
- * Club domestic league appearances and goals as of 25 October 2026 ‡ National team caps and goals as of 13 October 2026

Syntia Hikmat Salha (Arabic: سينتيا حكمت صالحة; born 12 January 2003) is a Lebanese footballer who plays as a winger or midfielder for Cypriot First Division club Xylofagou and the Lebanon national team.

Salha began her senior career with Akhaa Ahli Aley. She joined Safa in 2020, with whom she won their first league title. In 2022 Salha moved to BFA, also helping them win their first league title. She finished top scorer in the Lebanese league four times: in 2021, 2022, 2023 and 2024. Salha then moved to Cyprus, playing for Lakatamia between 2024 and 2026.

In 2021 Salha made her senior international debut for Lebanon, scoring her first goals against Sudan in the 2021 Arab Women's Cup. She helped Lebanon finish runners-up in the 2022 WAFF Women's Championship.

== Club career ==
=== Akhaa Ahli Aley and Safa ===
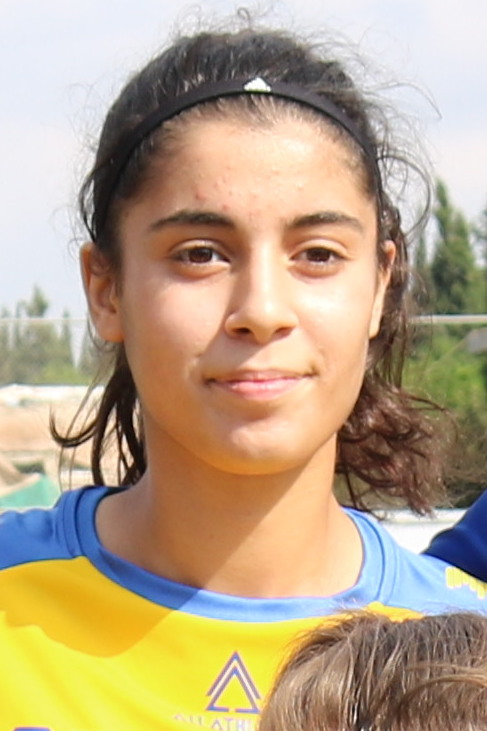
Salha with Safa in 2020

Coming through the youth system, Salha played for Akhaa Ahli Aley.

In October 2020, she joined Safa. Salha scored 13 goals for Safa in the 2020–21 season, helping her side win their first league title as the league top scorer. She also finished the 2021–22 season as top scorer with 20 goals.

=== BFA ===
Salha moved to BFA on 24 September 2022. With 29 goals and seven assists in 13 games in 2022–23, Salha was crowned top scorer of the league for the third time in a row, and helped BFA finish runners-up. In the 2023–24 season, Salha helped BFA lift their first league title unbeaten, scoring 40 goals in the season and winning the topscorer award for the fourth time in a row. Salha finished her stint with BFA as their all-time top scorer, scoring 69 goals across two league campaigns.

=== Lakatamia ===
==== 2024–25 season ====
In September 2024, Salha joined Cypriot First Division club Lakatamia. On 19 October 2024, Salha scored her first goal with Lakatamia, scoring the winning goal in a 1–0 victory over Karmiotissa Chrysomilia. On 10 November, she scored and provided an assist in Lakatamia's 2–1 away victory over Omonoia Nicosia. On 29 March 2025, she scored Lakatamia's second goal in a 2–0 victory over Omonoia Nicosia, finding the net in the 77th minute.

Sahla finished the 2024–25 league season with three goals in 16 appearances. In the Cypriot League Cup, she scored in Lakatamia's 2–0 victory over Omonoia on 13 April 2025. Lakatamia finished runners-up after losing 4–1 to Apollon Ladies, and Salha was nominated in the Cypriot First Division Best 11.

==== 2025–26 season ====
On 8 April 2025, she renewed her contract with the club for a further season. During the 2025–26 season, Salha scored five goals in ten appearances.

=== Xylofagou ===
In September 2026, Salha signed for Cypriot First Division club Xylofagou.

== International career ==
=== Youth ===
Salha played for Lebanon U15 at the 2018 WAFF U-15 Girls Championship, in which Lebanon finished runners-up. She also participated in the 2019 WAFF U-18 Girls Championship, in which Lebanon U18 won the tournament.

=== Senior ===
Salha made her international debut for Lebanon on 8 April 2021, coming on as a substitute in a friendly tournament game against Armenia. She scored her first two goals on 30 August 2021, in a 5–1 win against Sudan in the 2021 Arab Women's Cup. Salha was called up to represent Lebanon at the 2022 WAFF Women's Championship, helping her side finish runners-up.

In 2023, Salha assisted Lili Iskandar to score the lone goal against Bhutan in the extra-time of the final of the 2023 SAFF Friendly Tournament, thus winning their country their first ever trophy at female senior level. She was called up to the 2024 WAFF Women's Championship.

On 5 April 2025, Salha made her 30th international cap for Lebanon alongside Nathalie Matar, breaking Rana Al Mokdad's previous record of 29.

== Style of play ==
Salha can play as either a winger or midfielder.

== Personal life ==
Salha studied mechatronics engineering at the Lebanese American University.

== Career statistics ==
=== International ===
Scores and results list Lebanon's goal tally first, score column indicates score after each Salha goal.

List of international goals scored by Syntia Salha
No.	Date	Venue	Opponent	Score	Result	Competition
1	30 August 2021	Police Academy Stadium, Cairo, Egypt	Sudan	4–0	5–1	2021 Arab Women's Cup
2	30 August 2021	Police Academy Stadium, Cairo, Egypt	Sudan	5–0	5–1	2021 Arab Women's Cup
3	21 October 2021	Dolen Omurzakov Stadium, Bishkek, Kyrgyzstan	United Arab Emirates	1–0	1–0	2022 AFC Women's Asian Cup qualification
4	19 February 2023	Fouad Chehab Stadium, Jounieh, Lebanon	Egypt	1–0	1–2	2022 AFC Women's Asian Cup qualification
5	21 September 2023	King Fahd Sports City, Taif, Saudi Arabia	Bhutan	2–0	3–2	2023 SAFF Friendly Tournament
6	13 February 2024	Fouad Chehab Stadium, Jounieh, Lebanon	Syria	1–0	1–0	Friendly
7	19 February 2024	King Abdullah Sports City Reserve Stadium, Jeddah, Saudi Arabia	Saudi Arabia	3–0	3–2	2024 WAFF Championship
8	1 June 2025	Fouad Chehab Stadium, Jounieh, Lebanon	Palestine	1–0	2–1	Friendly
9	13 October 2026	Fouad Chehab Stadium, Jounieh, Lebanon	Palestine	1–0	2–1	Friendly

== Honours ==
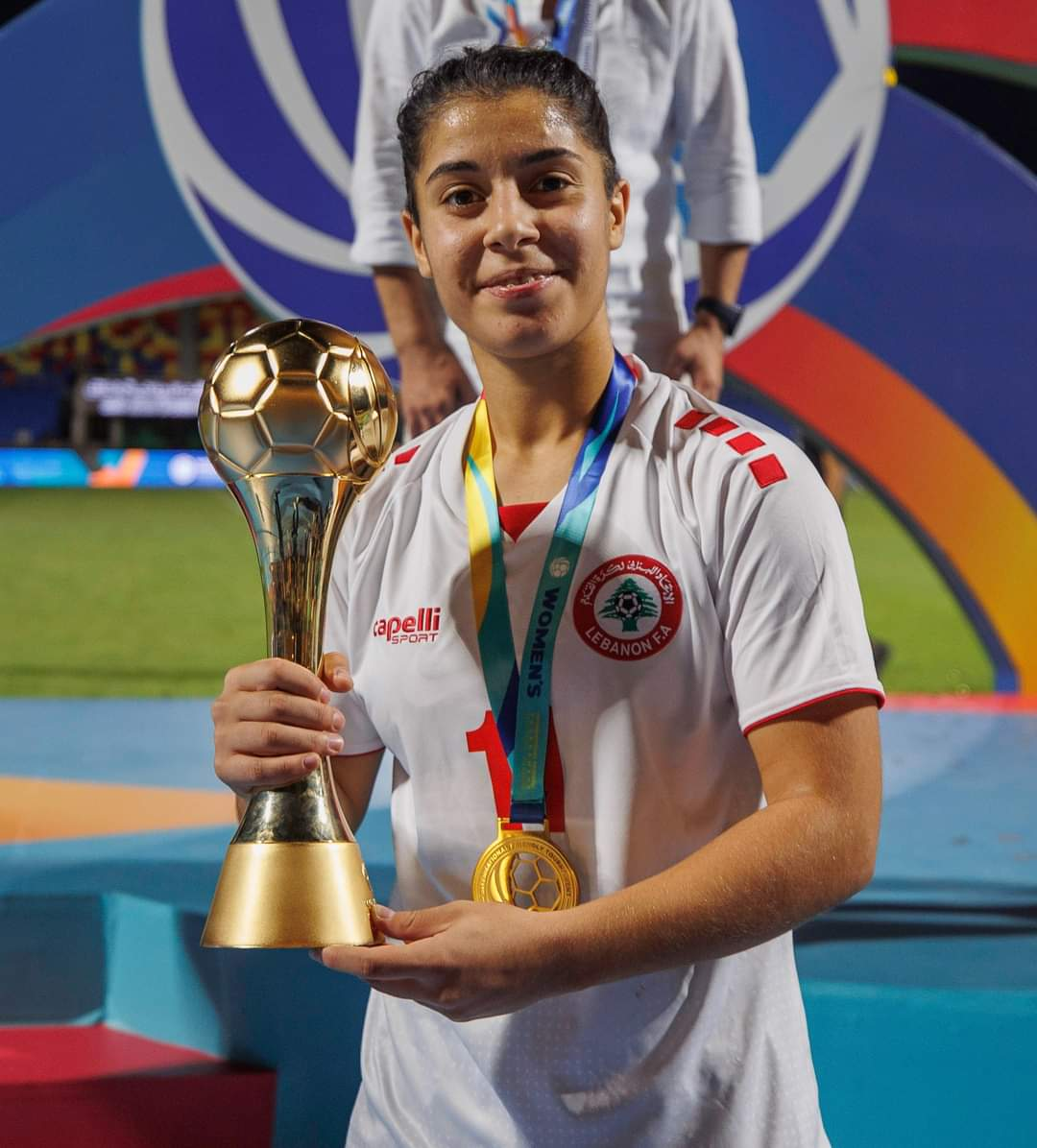
Salha lifting the 2023 SAFF Friendly Tournament trophy with Lebanon

Safa

- WAFF Women's Clubs Championship: 2022
- Lebanese Women's Football League: 2020–21; runner-up: 2021–22
- Lebanese Women's Super Cup: 2021–22

BFA

- Lebanese Women's Football League: 2023–24, 2024–25; runner-up: 2022–23

Lakatamia

- Cypriot League Cup runner-up: 2025

Lebanon

- WAFF Women's Championship runner-up: 2022
- SAFF Friendly Tournament: 2023
- WAFF U-18 Girls Championship: 2019
- WAFF U-15 Girls Championship: runner-up: 2018

Individual

- Lebanese Women's Football League top goalscorer: 2020–21, 2021–22, 2022–23, 2023–24
- Cypriot First Division Team of the Season: 2024–25

Records

- Lebanon all-time appearance holder: 41 appearances (as of 13 October 2026)
- Lebanese Women's Football League all-time top goalscorer: 134 goals (as of 10 May 2025)
- Akhaa Ahli Aley all-time top goalscorer: 30 goals (as of 11 August 2024)
- Safa all-time top goalscorer: 33 goals (as of 11 August 2024)
- Beirut Football Academy all-time top goalscorer: 71 goals (as of 10 May 2025)

== See also ==
- List of Lebanon women's international footballers
