= List of Lebanon women's international footballers =

The Lebanon women's national football team represents Lebanon in international women's football. The team is fielded by the Lebanese Football Association (LFA), the governing body of football in Lebanon, and competes as a member of the Asian Football Confederation (AFC). Lebanon competed in their first international match on 19 April 2006, a 12–0 defeat against Algeria at the 2006 Arab Women's Championship. More than 100 players have made at least one international appearance for the team.

== Players ==
This list includes all players who have made at least one appearance for the national team.

Key
**Bold**	Played for the national team in the past year

As of match played 13 October 2026

Lebanon women's national football team players
Player	Caps	Goals	Debut		Last or most recent match		Refs.
Player	Caps	Goals	Date	Opponent	Date	Opponent	Refs.
**Syntia Salha**	41	9	8 April 2021	Armenia	13 October 2026	Palestine	
**Lili Iskandar**	39	17	8 November 2018	Iran	13 October 2026	Palestine	
Nathalie Matar	37	0	13 March 2015	Latvia	19 July 2025	Singapore	
**Dima Al Kasti**	34	5	7 January 2019	Bahrain	28 November 2025	Jordan	
**Christy Maalouf**	33	18	24 August 2021	Tunisia	13 October 2026	Palestine	
**Zahwa Arabi**	32	2	24 August 2021	Tunisia	13 October 2026	Palestine	
**Waed Raed**	31	1	30 August 2021	Sudan	13 October 2026	Palestine	
Rana Al Mokdad	29	1	21 March 2017	Syria	27 February 2024	Nepal	
Samira Awad	27	5	8 November 2018	Iran	27 February 2024	Nepal	
Yara Bou Rada	26	2	8 November 2018	Iran	27 February 2024	Nepal	
Taghrid Hamadeh	22	2	19 April 2006	Algeria	18 March 2015	Bahrain	
Sara Bakri	22	7	19 April 2006	Algeria	21 March 2017	Syria	
Hanin Tamim	21	8	8 November 2018	Iran	27 February 2024	Nepal	
**Amina Karime**	19	0	12 August 2022	Syria	13 October 2026	Palestine	
Lara Bahlawan	17	3	4 October 2011	Iran	12 April 2021	Jordan	
Racha Yaghi	17	0	8 November 2018	Iran	18 July 2023	Palestine	
Celine Al Haddad	17	0	7 January 2019	Bahrain	30 September 2023	Bhutan	
**Sinal Breiche**	17	0	30 August 2021	Sudan	28 November 2025	Jordan	
Sahar Dbouk	15	1	3 September 2007	Jordan	18 March 2015	Bahrain	
**Lamitta El Dib**	15	0	24 August 2021	Tunisia	10 October 2026	Palestine	
**Ayana Rezkallah**	15	0	13 February 2024	Syria	13 October 2026	Palestine	
Hiba El Jaafil	14	3	19 April 2006	Algeria	9 June 2013	Kuwait	
Aya Jamal-Eddine	14	0	21 March 2017	Syria	24 October 2021	Guam	
Julie Atallah	14	0	1 September 2022	Jordan	17 February 2025	Myanmar	
Pilar Khoury	14	5	21 October 2021	United Arab Emirates	10 July 2025	Bhutan	
Mira Hoteit	14	0	8 November 2018	Iran	19 July 2025	Singapore	
**Joya-Maria Azzi**	14	1	8 November 2018	Iran	13 October 2026	Palestine	
**Mya Mhanna**	14	1	17 February 2025	Myanmar	13 October 2026	Palestine	
Darine Fakhreddine	13	0	19 April 2006	Algeria	18 March 2015	Bahrain	
**Lea El Hage Ali**	12	0	13 February 2024	Syria	26 November 2025	Palestine	
**Lama Abdine**	12	0	21 July 2023	Palestine	13 October 2026	Palestine	
Stephanie El Kazzi	11	0	24 August 2021	Tunisia	19 February 2024	Guam	
Nour Noujaim	11	0	8 April 2021	Armenia	7 July 2025	Jordan	
Marwa Khamis	10	0	19 October 2010	Egypt	18 March 2015	Bahrain	
Aya Al Jurdi	10	1	18 March 2015	Bahrain	5 April 2023	Chinese Taipei	
Hiba Allouch	10	1	12 August 2022	Syria	21 July 2023	Palestine	
Anabelle Ghabach	10	0	17 February 2025	Myanmar	19 July 2025	Singapore	
Tiana Jaber	10	0	20 February 2025	Nepal	19 July 2025	Singapore	
**Cecile Iskandar**	10	1	18 September 2023	Laos	13 October 2026	Palestine	
Dima Krayyem	9	1	19 April 2006	Algeria	8 October 2011	United Arab Emirates	
Evelina El Haddad	9	0	24 August 2021	Tunisia	1 September 2022	Jordan	
Farah El Tayar	9	1	8 April 2021	Armenia	7 April 2025	Comoros	
**Karly Harfouche**	9	0	18 July 2023	Palestine	10 October 2026	Palestine	
**Lara Bou Hamra**	9	0	18 September 2023	Laos	13 October 2026	Palestine	
Jouana Hamze	8	0	19 October 2010	Egypt	9 June 2013	Kuwait	
Nancy Tchaylian	8	0	19 October 2010	Egypt	12 April 2021	Jordan	
Sophie Fayad	8	2	12 August 2022	Syria	21 July 2023	Palestine	
**Clara Khalil**	8	0	13 February 2024	Syria	13 October 2026	Palestine	
Nadia Assaf	7	5	3 September 2007	Jordan	9 June 2013	Kuwait	
Jo-Anne Beaumier	7	0	8 November 2018	Iran	24 October 2021	Guam	
Aya El Amouri	6	2	19 April 2006	Algeria	23 October 2010	Iraq	
Saria Al Sayegh	6	2	24 April 2006	Morocco	9 June 2013	Kuwait	
Rayane Rachid	6	0	5 June 2013	Jordan	18 March 2015	Bahrain	
Yara Matar Hosry	6	0	9 June 2013	Kuwait	21 March 2017	Syria	
Myriam Neaimeh	5	0	19 April 2006	Algeria	17 September 2007	Syria	
Sarah Haidar	5	2	19 October 2010	Egypt	8 October 2011	United Arab Emirates	
Souad Takash	5	0	17 September 2011	Jordan	7 June 2013	Uzbekistan	
Nadine Schtakleff	5	2	5 September 2007	Iran	9 June 2013	Kuwait	
Assile Toufaily	5	0	9 June 2013	Kuwait	11 November 2018	Hong Kong	
Rida Wahab	5	0	8 April 2021	Armenia	24 October 2021	Guam	
Carla Abdel Khalek	5	0	27 August 2021	Egypt	14 August 2022	Syria	
Angelina Saade	5	0	18 July 2023	Palestine	21 February 2024	Saudi Arabia	
Paula Karam	5	0	21 September 2023	Bhutan	1 June 2025	Palestine	
Sherin Hasno	5	0	17 February 2025	Myanmar	16 July 2025	Iran	
**Maryam Lazkani**	5	0	7 July 2025	Jordan	26 November 2025	Palestine	
Tamar Nazikian	4	0	19 April 2006	Algeria	7 September 2007	Syria	
Aksana Yordanov	4	1	23 October 2010	Iraq	6 October 2011	Syria	
Reem Chalhoub	4	0	19 October 2010	Egypt	21 March 2017	Syria	
Cybelle Al Ghoul	4	1	13 March 2015	Latvia	11 November 2018	Hong Kong	
Tatiana Khalil	4	1	21 March 2017	Syria	15 January 2019	Palestine	
Ithamar Romanos	4	0	21 March 2017	Syria	15 January 2019	Palestine	
Rhea May Taleb	4	0	15 January 2019	Palestine	30 August 2021	Sudan	
Amal Salha	4	0	9 January 2019	United Arab Emirates	14 August 2022	Syria	
Mone Linnette Makkawi	4	0	12 August 2022	Syria	4 September 2022	Syria	
Christina Tikle	4	0	13 February 2024	Syria	27 February 2024	Nepal	
**Lea Douaihy**	4	0	5 April 2025	Comoros	13 October 2026	Palestine	
**Sara Issa**	4	0	26 November 2025	Palestine	13 October 2026	Palestine	
Stephanie Zein	3	0	19 April 2006	Algeria	3 September 2007	Jordan	
Iman Chaito	3	3	3 September 2007	Jordan	7 September 2007	Syria	
Reem Kenaan	3	0	3 September 2007	Jordan	7 September 2007	Syria	
Rana Abdelsattar	3	0	19 October 2010	Egypt	23 October 2010	Iraq	
Nathaline Gilinguirian	3	0	21 October 2010	Jordan	17 September 2011	Jordan	
Karen Haddad	3	0	3 September 2007	Jordan	4 October 2011	Iran	
Randa Rawas	3	0	3 September 2007	Jordan	4 October 2011	Iran	
Rayane Charif	3	0	21 October 2010	Jordan	8 October 2011	United Arab Emirates	
Sarah Awali	3	0	5 June 2013	Jordan	13 March 2015	Latvia	
Gabrielle Cherfane	3	0	12 March 2015	Greece	15 March 2015	United Arab Emirates	
Reine Alameh	3	0	5 June 2013	Jordan	21 March 2017	Syria	
Christelle Bedran	3	0	7 January 2019	Bahrain	11 January 2019	Jordan	
Fatima Al Zahraa Khachab	3	0	21 March 2017	Syria	15 January 2019	Palestine	
Ghiya Mtairek	3	0	8 April 2021	Armenia	12 August 2022	Syria	
Zahraa Assaf	3	0	12 August 2022	Syria	4 September 2022	Syria	
Maria Mansour	3	0	12 August 2022	Syria	19 February 2023	Egypt	
Serena Mansour	3	0	18 September 2023	Laos	1 June 2025	Palestine	
Marcelle Skaiki	3	0	17 February 2025	Myanmar	19 July 2025	Singapore	
Hana'a Achour	2	0	19 April 2006	Algeria	24 April 2006	Morocco	
Hanan Kassis	2	0	19 April 2006	Algeria	24 April 2006	Morocco	
Hoda El Awadi	2	0	3 September 2007	Jordan	5 September 2007	Iran	
Rajaa Chatah	2	0	19 October 2010	Egypt	23 October 2010	Iraq	
Ghiwa Saleh	2	1	6 October 2011	Syria	8 October 2011	United Arab Emirates	
Mariam Chehab	2	0	12 March 2015	Greece	18 March 2015	Bahrain	
Sandy Abi-Elias	2	0	8 November 2018	Iran	11 November 2018	Hong Kong	
Jana Assi	2	0	8 November 2018	Iran	11 November 2018	Hong Kong	
Aya El Boukhary	2	0	11 January 2019	Jordan	15 January 2019	Palestine	
Melanie Ghanime	2	0	8 April 2021	Armenia	10 April 2021	Lithuania	
Perla Nasr	2	0	10 April 2021	Lithuania	12 April 2021	Jordan	
Rakelle Nasr	2	0	12 August 2022	Syria	14 August 2022	Syria	
Anji Saad	2	0	12 August 2022	Syria	14 August 2022	Syria	
Yasmine Hamdar	2	0	18 September 2023	Laos	27 September 2023	Malaysia	
Marie-Therese Tikle	2	0	21 September 2023	Bhutan	15 February 2024	Syria	
Tia Rita Daher	2	0	13 February 2024	Syria	15 February 2024	Syria	
Clara El Najjar	2	0	13 February 2024	Syria	15 February 2024	Syria	
Tatianna Kanaan	2	0	17 February 2025	Myanmar	23 February 2025	Kyrgyzstan	
Zainab Abi Mosleh	2	0	5 April 2025	Comoros	7 April 2025	Comoros	
Leah Hachem	2	0	21 September 2023	Bhutan	10 July 2025	Bhutan	
**Shereen Karnib**	2	0	26 November 2025	Palestine	28 November 2025	Jordan	
**Yasmina Nassar**	2	0	26 November 2025	Palestine	28 November 2025	Jordan	
**Sally Al Moujarkach**	2	0	21 March 2017	Syria	13 October 2026	Palestine	
**Gianna Frangieh**	2	0	10 October 2026	Palestine	13 October 2026	Palestine	
**Lynn Moutran**	2	0	10 October 2026	Palestine	13 October 2026	Palestine	
Rana Nakhle	1	0	19 April 2006	Algeria	19 April 2006	Algeria	
Farah Mehdi	1	0	17 June 2013	Uzbekistan	17 June 2013	Uzbekistan	
Maria Aftimos	1	0	21 March 2017	Syria	21 March 2017	Syria	
Dana El Chaar	1	1	21 March 2017	Syria	21 March 2017	Syria	
Oula Farhat	1	0	21 March 2017	Syria	21 March 2017	Syria	
Lynn Sinno	1	0	21 March 2017	Syria	21 March 2017	Syria	
Reem Obeid	1	0	11 November 2018	Hong Kong	11 November 2018	Hong Kong	
Yasmin Sardouk	1	0	7 January 2019	Bahrain	7 January 2019	Bahrain	
Israa Toufaily	1	0	30 August 2021	Sudan	30 August 2021	Sudan	
Petra Khoury	1	0	4 September 2022	Syria	4 September 2022	Syria	
Selena Malaeb	1	0	21 July 2023	Palestine	21 July 2023	Palestine	
Tala Abi Akl	1	0	21 September 2023	Bhutan	21 September 2023	Bhutan	
Asiyah Zreika	1	0	19 July 2025	Singapore	19 July 2025	Singapore	
**Celine Bitar**	1	0	28 November 2025	Jordan	28 November 2025	Jordan	
**Yara El Gitani**	1	0	28 November 2025	Jordan	28 November 2025	Jordan	
**Marie-Joe Chebli**	1	0	13 October 2026	Palestine	13 October 2026	Palestine	
**Haya Najjad**	1	0	13 October 2026	Palestine	13 October 2026	Palestine	

== Born outside Lebanon ==
The following players:

1. have played at least one game for the full (senior women's) Lebanon international team; and
2. were born outside Lebanon.

This list includes players who have dual citizenship with Lebanon and/or have become naturalized Lebanese citizens.

Footballers born outside Lebanon
Country of birth	Name	Ref.
Australia	Anabelle Ghabach	
Australia	Tiana Jaber	
Australia	Shereen Karnib	
Australia	Mya Mhanna	
Australia	Asiyah Zreika	
Canada	Tala Abi Akl	
Canada	Jo-Anne Beaumier	
Canada	Pilar Khoury	
Canada	Selena Malaeb	
Denmark	Sherin Hasno	
England	Sandy Abi-Elias	
Finland	Zainab Abi Mosleh	
France	Julie Atallah	
France	Leah Hachem	
France	Tatiana Khalil	
France	Lynn Moutran	
Ghana	Amina Karime	
Sweden	Petra Khoury	
Syria	Nathaline Gilinguirian	
Ukraine	Evelina El Haddad	
United Arab Emirates	Nadia Assaf	
United States	Maryam Lazkani	
Venezuela	Dana El Chaar	

List of countries
Country of birth	Total
Australia	5
Canada	4
France	4
Denmark	1
England	1
Finland	1
Ghana	1
Sweden	1
Syria	1
Ukraine	1
United Arab Emirates	1
United States	1
Venezuela	1

== See also ==
- List of Lebanon international footballers
- List of Lebanon international footballers born outside Lebanon
- Lebanon women's national football team results
- List of Lebanon women's national football team managers
