= Qatar women's national football team results =

This article lists the results and fixtures for the Qatar women's national football team. The national team's first activity was in 2010, when they debuted by participating in the Arabia Women's Cup in Bahrain, in which they faced Bahrain, Syria, and Palestine. The team was quite unsuccessful as they finished bottom of the group, losing all matches; Qatar is unranked in the FIFA Women's World Ranking. Their latest FIFA ranking was in September 2015, when they ranked 139 out of 147. Since 2014, the team has been inactive but has appeared on some special events.

== Record per opponent ==
Key

Positive balance (more wins than losses)
Neutral balance (as many wins as losses)
Negative balance (more losses than wins)

The following table shows Qatar' all-time official international record per opponent:

Opponent	Pld	W	D	L	GF	GA	GD	W%	Confederation
Afghanistan	1	0	0	1	0	2	–2	0	AFC
Bahrain	4	0	0	4	2	32	–30	0	AFC
Jordan	1	0	0	1	0	7	–7	0	AFC
Kuwait	1	1	0	0	2	0	+2	100	AFC
Maldives	3	1	0	2	4	5	–1	33.33	AFC
Nepal	2	0	0	2	0	9	–9	0	AFC
Palestine	2	0	0	2	0	22	–22	0	AFC
Syria	1	0	0	1	0	12	–12	0	AFC
Total	15	2	0	13	8	89	–81	13.33	—

Last updated: Qatar vs Bahrain, 19 April 2014.

== Results ==
=== 2010 ===
18 October 2010 2010 Arabia Women's Cup Group A	Bahrain	17–0	Qatar	Riffa, Bahrain
19:30 UTC+3	Al-Khalifa (??); Al-Majri (??); Mohandes (??); Al-Khalifa (??); Al-Hashmi (??); Al-Daisi (??); Fayez (??); ?? (??)	Report		Stadium: National Stadium

20 October 2010 2010 Arabia Women's Cup Group A	Qatar	0–18	Palestine	Manama, Bahrain
--:-- UTC+3			Hussein (??); Odeh (??); Shaheen (??); Sahjian (??); Jarban (??); Moalem (??)	Stadium: Al Ahli Stadium

22 October 2010 2010 Arabia Women's Cup Group A	Syria	12–0	Qatar	Bahrain
--:-- UTC+3

=== 2012 ===
16 February 2012 Friendly	Qatar	0–2	Afghanistan	Doha, Qatar
--:-- UTC+3		Report

31 March 2012 Friendly	Qatar	4–1	Maldives	Doha, Qatar
--:-- UTC+3

26 May 2012 Friendly	Qatar	2–0	Kuwait	Doha, Qatar
--:-- UTC+3		Report

=== 2013 ===
25 June 2013 Friendly	Maldives	1–0	Qatar	Malé, Maldives
--:-- UTC+5

27 June 2013 Friendly	Maldives	3–0	Qatar	Malé, Maldives
--:-- UTC+5

24 October 2013 Friendly	Qatar	0–6	Nepal	Doha, Qatar
--:-- UTC+3		Report	Rana 12', 45'; Lama 27'; Thapa 30'; Bhandari (??); Rai (??)

26 October 2013 Friendly	Qatar	0–3	Nepal	Doha, Qatar
--:-- UTC+3

3 November 2013 Friendly	Qatar	0–4	Bahrain	Doha, Qatar
--:-- UTC+3		Report

5 November 2013 Friendly	Qatar	0–3	Bahrain	Doha, Qatar
--:-- UTC+3		Report

=== 2014 ===
15 April 2014 2014 WAFF Women's Championship GS	Palestine	4–0	Qatar	Amman, Jordan
20:00 UTC+2	Salama 20', 47', 65'; Nasser 56'	Report		Stadium: Petra Stadium; Attendance: 150; Referee: Ahmad Yacoub Ibrahim (Jordan)

17 April 2014 2014 WAFF Women's Championship GS	Qatar	0–7	Jordan	Amman, Jordan
16:00 UTC+2		Report	Al-Nahar 9', 14', 38' (pen.); Sweilem 40'; Al-Sufy 43'; Khalil 85'	Stadium: Petra Stadium; Attendance: 800; Referee: Mohammed Ibdeir (Palestine)

19 April 2014 2014 WAFF Women's Championship GS	Qatar	2–8	Bahrain	Amman, Jordan
20:00 UTC+2	Al-Naemi 51'; Al-Jassim 90+2'	Report	Fayez 31', 88'; Al-Hashmi 39'; Yaqoob 51', 61', 86'; Al-Khalifa 62'; Al-Majri 90'	Stadium: Petra Stadium; Attendance: 300; Referee: Ahmad Yacoub Ibrahim (Jordan)

=== 2021 ===
10 November 2021 Unofficial Friendly	Qatar	5–0	Afghanistan	Doha, Qatar
--:-- UTC+3		Report		Stadium: Khalifa International Stadium

== See also ==
- Qatar national football team results
