= Abir (disambiguation) =

Abir, commonly known as gulal, is the traditional name given to the powder which is red in colour used for the typical Hindu rituals in India.

Abir is also an Arabic female given name meaning "fragrance, aroma" and a Hebrew male given name meaning "strong, brave" and may refer to:

== Bengali male name ==
- Abir Chatterjee (born 1980), Indian actor
- Abir Goswami (1976–2013), Indian actor
- Abir Biswas, Indian politician
- Abir Hossain Angkon, Bangladeshi film actor
- Abir Mukherjee (born c. 1974), British-Indian author

== Arabic female name ==
- Abir Al-Tabbaa, professor of Geotechnical Engineering
- Abir Muhaisen (born 1973), adopted daughter of King Hussein of Jordan
- Abir Al-Sahlani (born 1976), Swedish-Iraqi politician
- Abir Moussi (born 1975), Tunisian lawyer and politician

== Hebrew male name ==
- Abir Sultan (born 1985), Israeli photographer
- Abir Har Even (born 1947), Israelian chess player
- Abir Kara (born 1983), Israeli businessman and politician

== Other people ==
- Abir Igamberdiev (born 1959), Russian-Canadian theoretical biologist and plant scientist

== Other uses ==
- Abir Congo Company
- AIL Abir or "warrior", an Israel Defense Forces M462 military truck
- Abir, a martial arts discipline taught by Yehoshua Sofer

== See also ==
- Abeer (disambiguation), an Arabic feminine name meaning "fragrance"
- Gulaal (film), a 2009 Indian film by Anurag Kashyap
