= Abeer =

Female name meaning fragrance

Abeer, also Abeir, Abbeir, Abbier or Abir (Arabic: عبير) is a feminine Arabic-language name meaning fragrance, aroma, perfume or a beautiful scent.

== Notable people ==
- Abeer Abdelrahman (born 1992), Egyptian weightlifter
- Abeer Abu Ghaith (born c. 1985), Palestinian technology entrepreneur, and social activist
- Abeer Al-Janaby, Iraqi girl killed by United States forces in the Mahmudiyah rape and killings
- Abeer Al-Nahar (born 1991), Jordanian footballer
- Abeer Alwan, American electrical engineer and speech processing researcher
- Abeer Essawy (born 1986), Egyptian taekwondo practitioner
- Abeer Hamza, Egyptian lecturer
- Abeer Issa (born 1961), Jordanian actress
- Abeer MacIntyre (born 1964), British-Jordanian radio and television presenter
- Abeer Nehme (born 1980), Lebanese singer
- Abeer Odeh (born 1962), Palestinian politician
- Abeer Rantisi (born 1987), Jordanian footballer
- Abeer Seikaly, Jordanian-Canadian architect
- Abeer bint Abdullah Al Saud, Saudi royal

== See also ==
- Abir (disambiguation)
