= Syria women's national football team results =

The Syria women's national football team is the representative women's association football team of Syria. Its governing body is the Syrian Football Association (SFA) and it competes as a member of the Asian Football Confederation (AFC).

The national team's first activity was in 2005, when they participated in WAFF first-ever women's Championship. They made their first Asian cup qualifiers appearance in 2017 when they competed in Group D alongside Vietnam, Myanmar, Iran, and Singapore, they were quite unsuccessful as they finished last in the group losing all matches. As of December 2023, Syria is 160th in the FIFA Women's World Rankings.

== Record per opponent ==
Key

Positive balance (more wins than losses)
Neutral balance (as many wins as losses)
Negative balance (more losses than wins)

The following table shows Syria's all-time official international record per opponent:

Opponent	Pld	W	D	L	GF	GA	GD	W%	Confederation
Bahrain	2	1	0	1	3	4	−1	50	AFC
Egypt	1	0	0	1	0	6	−6	0	CAF
Iran	4	0	0	4	1	34	−33	0	AFC
Iraq	1	1	0	0	3	0	+3	100	AFC
Jordan	5	0	0	5	2	29	−27	0	AFC
Lebanon	10	1	1	8	6	24	−18	10	AFC
Myanmar	1	0	0	1	0	14	−14	0	AFC
Nepal	1	0	0	1	1	4	−3	0	AFC
Palestine	5	2	1	2	10	8	+2	40	AFC
Qatar	1	1	0	0	12	0	+12	100	AFC
Saudi Arabia	2	0	0	2	0	5	−5	0	AFC
Singapore	1	0	0	1	0	1	−1	0	AFC
Tunisia	1	0	0	1	0	10	−10	0	CAF
United Arab Emirates	4	2	0	2	5	9	−4	50	AFC
Vietnam	1	0	0	1	0	11	−11	0	AFC
Total	40	8	2	30	44	158	−114	20	—

Last updated: Syria vs Iraq, 24 February 2024. Statistics include official FIFA-recognised matches only.

== Results ==
Legend

Win Draw Lose Fixture

=== 2005 ===
23 September 2005 2005 WAFF Women's Championship	Iran	5–0	Syria	Amman, Jordan
				Stadium: Amman International Stadium

25 September 2005 2005 WAFF Women's Championship	Palestine	0–4	Syria	Amman, Jordan
				Stadium: Amman International Stadium

27 September 2005 2005 WAFF Women's Championship	Syria	0–6	Jordan	Amman, Jordan
				Stadium: Amman International Stadium

29 September 2005 2005 WAFF Women's Championship	Syria	2–1	Bahrain	Amman, Jordan
				Stadium: Amman International Stadium

=== 2006 ===
20 April 2006 2006 Arab Women's Championship Group A	Palestine	1–2	Syria	Alexandria, Egypt
	?? 37'		?? 39'; ?? 50'	Stadium: Alexandria Stadium

22 April 2006 2006 Arab Women's Championship Group A	Syria	0–6	Egypt	Alexandria, Egypt
			Abdulmalek 7', 50'; Abdel-Halim 23', 48'; Rashad 39'; Abdullatif 90+2'	Stadium: Alexandria Stadium

24 April 2006 2006 Arab Women's Championship Group A	Tunisia	10–0	Syria	Alexandria, Egypt
				Stadium: Alexandria Stadium

=== 2007 ===
30 March 2007 Friendly	Syria	2–0	Lebanon	Damascus, Syria

1 April 2007 Friendly	Syria	0–1	Lebanon	Damascus, Syria
		Report	El Ammouri

3 September 2007 2007 WAFF Women's Championship	Iran	13–0	Syria	Amman, Jordan

5 September 2007 2007 WAFF Women's Championship	Syria	1–7	Jordan	Amman, Jordan

7 September 2007 2007 WAFF Women's Championship	Syria	0–7	Lebanon	Amman, Jordan
			Cheaitou (??); Assaf (??); Hamadeh (??); Kraim (??)

=== 2010 ===
19 July 2010 Friendly	Syria	0–8	Jordan	Damascus, Syria
		Report

21 July 2010 Friendly	Syria	1–4	Jordan	Damascus, Syria
		Report

18 October 2010 2010 Arabia Women's Cup Group A	Palestine	5–3	Syria	Riffa, Bahrain
				Stadium: Bahrain National Stadium

20 October 2010 2010 Arabia Women's Cup Group A	Bahrain	3–1	Syria	Manama, Bahrain
				Stadium: Al Ahli Stadium (Bahrain)

22 October 2010 2010 Arabia Women's Cup Group A	Syria	12–0	Qatar	Manama, Bahrain
				Stadium: Al Ahli Stadium (Bahrain)

=== 2011 ===
4 October 2011 2011 WAFF Women's Championship Group B	United Arab Emirates	6–0	Syria	Abu Dhabi, United Arab Emirates
15:15	Zerrouki 5', 60'; Marek 39', 45+1', 54', 87'	Report		Stadium: Zayed Bin Sultan Stadium

6 October 2011 2011 WAFF Women's Championship Group B	Syria	0–1	Lebanon	Abu Dhabi, United Arab Emirates
17:45		Report	Saleh 90+1'	Stadium: Zayed Bin Sultan Stadium

8 October 2011 2011 WAFF Women's Championship Group B	Iran	4–1	Syria	Abu Dhabi, United Arab Emirates
17:45	Soleimani 15', 32'; Gholami 44', 49'	Report	Alshater 66'	Stadium: Zayed Bin Sultan Stadium

=== 2017 ===
21 March 2017 Friendly	Lebanon	4–0	Syria	Beirut, Lebanon
	Bakri 15'; Ghoul 30'; Khalil 75'; Shaar 85'	Report

3 April 2017 2018 AFC Women's Asian Cup qualification Group D	Singapore	1–0	Syria	Hanoi, Vietnam
18:00 UTC+7	Xian 81'	Report		Stadium: Vietnam YFT Center Field no.3 Attendance: 55; Referee: Edita Mirabidova (Uzbekistan)

5 April 2017 2018 AFC Women's Asian Cup qualification Group D	Syria	0–11	Vietnam	Hanoi, Vietnam
18:00 UTC+7		Report	Nguyễn Thị Liễu 1', 45+1'; Phạm Hải Yến 6', 24'; Nguyễn Thị Tuyết Dung 13' (pen.), 38'; Nguyễn Thị Nguyệt 17'; Nguyễn Thị Hòa 20', 90'; Nguyễn Thị Muôn 71'; Nguyễn Thị Thúy Hằng 76'	Stadium: Vietnam YFT Center Field no.3 Attendance: 300; Referee: Mi Siyu (China)

7 April 2017 2018 AFC Women's Asian Cup qualification Group D	Myanmar	14–0	Syria	Hanoi, Vietnam
15:00 UTC+7	Naw Ar Lo Wer Phaw 7', 41', 90+6'; Yee Yee Oo 19', 45+2', 76', 82'; Win Theingi Tun 25' (pen.), 38', 39', 53', 60'; Wai Wai Aung 67'; Phu Pwint Khaing 87'	Report		Stadium: Vietnam YFT Center Field no.3 Attendance: 56; Referee: Asaka Matsushita (Japan)

11 April 2017 2018 AFC Women's Asian Cup qualification Group D	Syria	0–12	Iran	Hanoi, Vietnam
15:00 UTC+7		Report	Ghanbari 4', 35', 66', 88'; Zohrabi 13', 27', 45+1', 54', 87'; Rouzbahan 16'; Ghasemi 63'; Ghomi 90+2'	Stadium: Vietnam YFT Center Field no.3 Attendance: 35; Referee: Mi Siyu (China)

=== 2022 ===
12 August 2022 Friendly	Lebanon	1–1	Syria	Bhamdoun, Lebanon
16:00 UTC+3	Maalouf 15'	Report	Aizouq 70'	Stadium: Amin Abdelnour Stadium; Referee: Doumouh Al Bakkar (Lebanon)

14 August 2022 Friendly	Lebanon	2–1	Syria	Bhamdoun, Lebanon
11:00 UTC+3	Maalouf 20', 55'	Report	Mohammad 48'	Stadium: Amin Abdelnour Stadium; Referee: Doumouh Al Bakkar (Lebanon)

17 August 2022 Friendly	United Arab Emirates	1–4	Syria	Dubai, UAE
19:30 UTC+4		Report	Noureddin 29' (pen.); Hammou 32', 45'; Al Halabi 88'	Stadium: Theyab Awana Stadium

19 August 2022 Friendly	United Arab Emirates	2–0	Syria	Dubai, UAE
19:30 UTC+4		Report		Stadium: Theyab Awana Stadium

21 August 2022 Friendly	United Arab Emirates	0–1	Syria	Dubai, UAE
19:25 UTC+4		Report	Aizouq 70'	Stadium: Theyab Awana Stadium

29 August 2022 2022 WAFF Championship	Jordan	4–0	Syria	Amman, Jordan
21:00 UTC+3	Jbarah 11', 61', 89'; Al Bitar 66'	Report		Stadium: Petra Stadium; Attendance: 500; Referee: Doumouh Al Bakkar (Lebanon)

1 September 2022 2022 WAFF Championship	Syria	1–1	Palestine	Amman, Jordan
17:00 UTC+3	Hammou 52'	Report	Abed 46'	Stadium: Petra Stadium; Attendance: 200; Referee: Ahmed Kadhim Gatea (Iraq)

4 September 2022 2022 WAFF Championship	Lebanon	5–2	Syria	Amman, Jordan
17:00 UTC+3	Oghlan 9' (o.g.); Azzi 42'; Maalouf 51'; Allouch 62'; Khoury 68'	Report	Gharib 73'; Mohammad 90+1'	Stadium: Petra Stadium; Attendance: 100; Referee: Esra'a Al Mbaidin (Jordan)

=== 2024 ===
8 January 2024 Friendly	Saudi Arabia	2–0	Syria	Jeddah, Saudi Arabia
18:00 UTC+3	Tawfiq 8'; Mobarak 55'	Report		Stadium: King Abdullah Sports City

12 January 2024 Friendly	Saudi Arabia	3–0	Syria	Jeddah, Saudi Arabia
18:00 UTC+3	N. Saud (yellow card) 43'; Mobarak 45+1', 76', 82'	Report	R. Ibrahim (yellow card) 63'	Referee: Doumouh Al Bakkar (Lebanon)

13 February 2024 Friendly	Lebanon	1–0	Syria	Jounieh, Lebanon
14:00 UTC+2	Salha 17'	Report		Stadium: Fouad Chehab Stadium; Referee: Doumouh Al Bakkar (Lebanon)

15 February 2024 Friendly	Lebanon	3–1	Syria	Beirut, Lebanon
19:00 UTC+2	Bou Rada 20'; Tamim 52'; Kasti 76'	Report	Mustafa 82'	Stadium: Safa Stadium

20 February 2024 2024 WAFF Women's Championship	Nepal	4–1	Syria	Jeddah, Saudi Arabia
17:00 UTC+3	Karki 9'; Basnet 12'; Bhandari 18'; Poudel 68'	Report	Mustafa 43'	Stadium: King Abdullah Sports City Reserve Stadium; Referee: Doumouh Al Bakkar (Lebanon)

22 February 2024 2024 WAFF Women's Championship	Syria	0–1	Palestine	Jeddah, Saudi Arabia
20:00 UTC+3		Report	Qassis 87'	Stadium: King Abdullah Sports City Reserve Stadium; Referee: Khuloud Al-Zaabi (United Arab Emirates)

24 February 2024 2024 WAFF Women's Championship	Syria	3–0	Iraq	Jeddah, Saudi Arabia
17:00 UTC+3	Elias 38'; Mustafa 49'; Khwandi 80'	Report		Stadium: King Abdullah Sports City Reserve Stadium; Referee: Doumouh Al Bakkar (Lebanon)

== See also ==
- Syria national football team results
