= Natali Shaheen =

Palestinian footballer

Personal information
- Full name: Natali Nabeel Shaheen
- Date of birth: 2 July 1994 (age 32)
- Place of birth: Jericho, Palestine
- Position: Midfielder

Senior career*
Years	Team	Apps	(Gls)
–2018	Sareyyet Ramallah		
2019–2020	SEF Torres 1903		

International career^{‡}
2005–	Palestine	33	(7)
- * Club domestic league appearances and goals ‡ National team caps and goals as of 18:55, 1 October 2015 (UTC)

Natali Nabeel Shaheen (Arabic: نتالي نبيل شاهين; born 2 July 1994) is a Palestinian former professional footballer who used to play as a midfielder for the Palestine national team.

== Club career ==
Shaheen played for Sareyyet Ramallah football team, besides playing basketball for Seeds of Hope in Jericho and being an athletics player at the University of Jerusalem. She left Jericho for the island of Sardinia, Italy, to pursue her higher education and to present her doctoral thesis in women's sports, particularly in futsal. During her time in Italy, she played for Fc Sassari Torres Femminile in the third tier of the Italian League.

=== Sareyyet Ramallah ===
In 2015, Shaheen was declared the top goal-scorer in the President's Cup, having scored a total of 11 goals during the tournament.

== International career ==
In 2005, At the age of 15, Shaheen was selected to be part of the first-ever squad representing Palestine in the 2005 WAFF Women's Championship. She was named the Best young player at the tournament.

== Career statistics ==
Scores and results list Palestine's goal tally first, score column indicates score after each Shaheen goal.

List of international goals scored by Natali Shaheen
No.	Date	Venue	Opponent	Score	Result	Competition	Ref.
1	27 April 2009	Kuala Lumpur, Malaysia	Kyrgyzstan	1–4	1–4	2010 Asian Cup qualification	
2	20 October 2010	Manama, Bahrain	Qatar		0–18	2010 Arabia Women's Cup	
3	20 October 2010	Manama, Bahrain	Qatar		0–18	2010 Arabia Women's Cup	
4	20 October 2010	Manama, Bahrain	Qatar		0–18	2010 Arabia Women's Cup	
5	27 October 2010	Riffa, Bahrain	Bahrain	1–5	1–5	2010 Arabia Women's Cup	
6	17 April 2014	Amman, Jordan	Bahrain	1–0	4–0	2014 WAFF Women's Championship	
7	15 March 2015	Amman, Jordan	Hong Kong	1–2	2–2	2016 AFC Women's Olympic Qualifying Tournament	
