= Har-Even =

Har-Even (Hebrew: הר־אבן) is a Hebrew surname, may be a Hebraization of the surname Steinberg, both literally meaning "stone mountain. Notable people with the surname include:

- Abir Har Even, Israeli chess player
- Aby Har Even, Israeli military scientist
- Yoav Har-Even, president and CEO of Rafael Advanced Defense Systems
