= Akash Koto Dure =

2014 Bangladeshi film

- Poster
- Bengali: আকাশ কত দূরে
- Directed by: Samia Zaman
- Written by: Zulfiqer Russell
- Produced by: Impress Telefilm; Versa Media
- Starring: Razzak; Sharmili Ahmed; Abir Hossain Angkon; Faria Shahrin; Mostafa Prokash
- Cinematography: Khair Khandakar
- Edited by: Farhad Ahmed
- Music by: Songs: Ibrab Tipu & Belal Khan; Score: Sujan E. Bin Wadud
- Distributed by: Impress Telefilm
- Release date: 14 February 2014
- Running time: 116 minutes
- Country: Bangladesh
- Language: Bengali

Akash Koto Dure (Bengali: আকাশ কত দূরে English: The Distant Sky) is a 2014 Bangladeshi film starring Razzak, Sharmili Ahmed, Abir Hossain Angkon, Faria Shahrin, Mostafa Prokash, and Ankon (in their acting debut for the latter three). The film had its world premiere in Dhaka on 11 February 2014. It began a limited release in the capital on 14 February 2014 before expanding to Mymensingh and Khulna two weeks later.

== Plot ==
Bichchu is a young boy who grows up in an orphanage since he has no parents. He breaks many of the rules there and gets punished for them, which prompts him to run away from the orphanage with help from a friend. Afterwards, he decides to find some food to eat. He then meets two boys named Bullet & Joshim, who offer Bichchu their food and steal a car window to sell to a mechanic for some money. Bichchu falls asleep and wakes up to find Bullet & Joshim, who both take him to a den. Bichchu then gets introduced to the boss (nicknamed as "Ostaad") and Pari. The next day, Bichchu begins to learn that the people in the den find illegal ways to earn money by stealing things. Bichchu does his first mission successfully but gets his leg sprained when he does a second mission.

During this time, Pari has a love interest with a man named Arif who wants to travel to Canada. Ostaad later decides to arrange the marriage for Pari and Arif. While that's happening, Bullet & Joshim attempt to steal another car window while Bichchu makes sure no one gets suspicious of them. The owner of the car arrives and find Bullet & Joshim. They both make a run for it. Bichchu does the same as well but is brutally attacked by a bunch of pedestrians. The owner of the car who is an old man tells the pedestrians to stop and then take Bichchu by the car owner to the hospital. Meanwhile, Bullet & Joshim run back to the den and tell Ostaad and everyone else that Bichchu has been nabbed. Meanwhile at the hospital, the old man forgives Bichchu and offers him to live with him since he has no family left. After Bichchu feels better, he is taken to the old mans home. The old mans wife gets suspicious of Bichchu and suspects that he will steal something and disappear which makes the old mans wife not fond of Bichchu. Later, the old man tells Bichchu that he can call him "Dadu"(grandfather in bengali) which Bichchu likes.

Later, Dadu notices that the way Bichchu walks is identical to how his daughter walks, but doesn't think much of it. Dadu later has to do something outside, so he takes his car and leaves Bichchu inside with an envelope for of cash. Bullet & Joshim find him in the car and when they see an envelope of cash, Bullet & Joshim steal it and run back to the den while Bichchu chases them to try and retrieve the money back. When Dadu comes back to the car and finds Bichchu missing as well as the money, he gets confused by this. His wife gets mad at this and makes him regret it. Meanwhile at the den, Ostaad finds the money given by Bullet & Joshim and is happy with it. Bichchu begs Ostaad to desperately give the cash back but gets kicked by him. Pari finds out about this and tells Ostaad to return the money back to Bichchu since it belonged to him first. Ostaad then decides to call Arif and tell him that Pari has run away and doesn't actually love Arif. Arif doesn't believe this and begs Ostaad to find Pari but says he doesn't know what to do now.

Meanwhile, Dadu believes that Bichchu might be related to his family and remembers an orphanage Bichchu mentioned earlier. When Dadu and his wife go to the orphanage, the headmaster tells him that Bichchu was a huge rascal and that he is happy he ran away. Bichchu’s friend Palesh overhears their conversation and talks to them about it. Palesh explains that Bichchu was tortured at the orphanage and decided to run away. Arif then comes to the address where his parents allowed him to marry Pari, but finds it locked. A neighbor tells him that the new owners will arrive soon and that the house was actually sold before, which confuses Arif.

Dadu then meets an old farmer who explains that years ago, he found a pregnant woman walking alone and struggling in pain. He later took her home and she gave birth to a boy before she died. He also mentions a locket that she had worn. When Dadu realizes this, he asks where it is, but the farmer tells them he sold it to a doctor earlier who still practices in the village. Dadu retrieves the locket back and when his wife finds a picture of her son and daughter in law, she breaks down, realizing that Bichchu is their real son. Later, it is revealed that Arif is actually a TV reporter, something Pari never knew about. Later, at Dadu’s home, someone tells him the Bichchu came and left the same envelope that had been stolen by Bullet & Joshim. Dadu and his wife both realize that Bichchu is actually their biological grandson and that he would never steal anything. Meanwhile, the police find the den and capture everyone there. When Arif sees Pari on a live news broadcast as one of the captured people, he decides to go there and talk to her. Dadu and his wife also see the live broadcast on TV and go to the prison to see their grandson.

When Dadu comes in to meet Bichchu, he explains that Bichchu is actually his biological grandson. Bichchu doesn't want to go without Pari and his friends, and Dadu promises to take them all in soon. Dadu then takes Bichchu and leaves the prison. Arif comes in afterwards and reveals to Pari that he is actually a TV reporter. This makes Pari realize that he lied to her, which makes her sad. Arif then tells Pari that he truly loves her before shedding a single tear. Later, Bichchu gets ready for his first day at school and is given a kiss by his grandmother.

== Cast ==
- Razzak as Dadu, Bichchu's biological grandfather
- Sharmili Ahmed as Dadu's wife, Bichchu's biological grandmother
- Faria Shahrin as Pori
- Abir Hossain Angkon as Bichchu
- Mostafa Prokash as Arif, a tv reporter who lied to be with Pari
- Sagor
- Rahim Badsha
- Shuvro
- Mosarraf Hossain
- Kazi Razu
- Shamima Nazneen
- Misha Sawdagor as the boss of the den (nicknamed "Ostaad")

== Music ==
The songs were created by Ibrab Tipu & Belal Khan. The lyrics were written by Zulfiqer Russel and the score was composed by Sujan bin Wadud.

Track No	Title	Translation	Singer(s)	Note
1	"Kothai Achho O Doyamoy"	"Where are you, O merciful"	Mohona	
2	"Cheleti"	"The boy"	Belal Khan	End credit music (without vocals)
3	"Nesha Amar E Mone"	"Addiction is in my mind"	Faria Shahrin	
4	"Bhalobashi Etai Shesh Kotha"	"Love is the last word"	Belal Khan & Kheya	
5	"Elo Re Elo"	"Come on, come on"	Kona & Khude Gaan Raj Pranti & Kobi	Some of the filming took place at Fantasy Kingdom.

== Screenings ==
Akash Koto Dure was screened at several international film festivals, including the Mumbai Women's International Film Festival (2013), the 10th Geneva International Film Festival (2014), the 7th Bengaluru International Film Festival (2014), the 5th Kolkata International Children’s Film Festival (2015), the 15th Rainbow Film Festival in London (2014), and the Trans-Saharan Zagora International Film Festival in Morocco (2014).

== Response ==
The film was reviewed by Mohammad Zahidul Islam from The Daily Star as "The mediocre acting of few characters might come to front as viewers start watching the movie. Faria, being new in media, tried her best, yet has a long way to go as an actor, as do Aunkon and Prokash. All in all, it is a wonderful Bangla movie to enjoyed seen with family and friends".
