= Samia Zaman =

Bangladeshi women journalists

- সামিয়া জামান
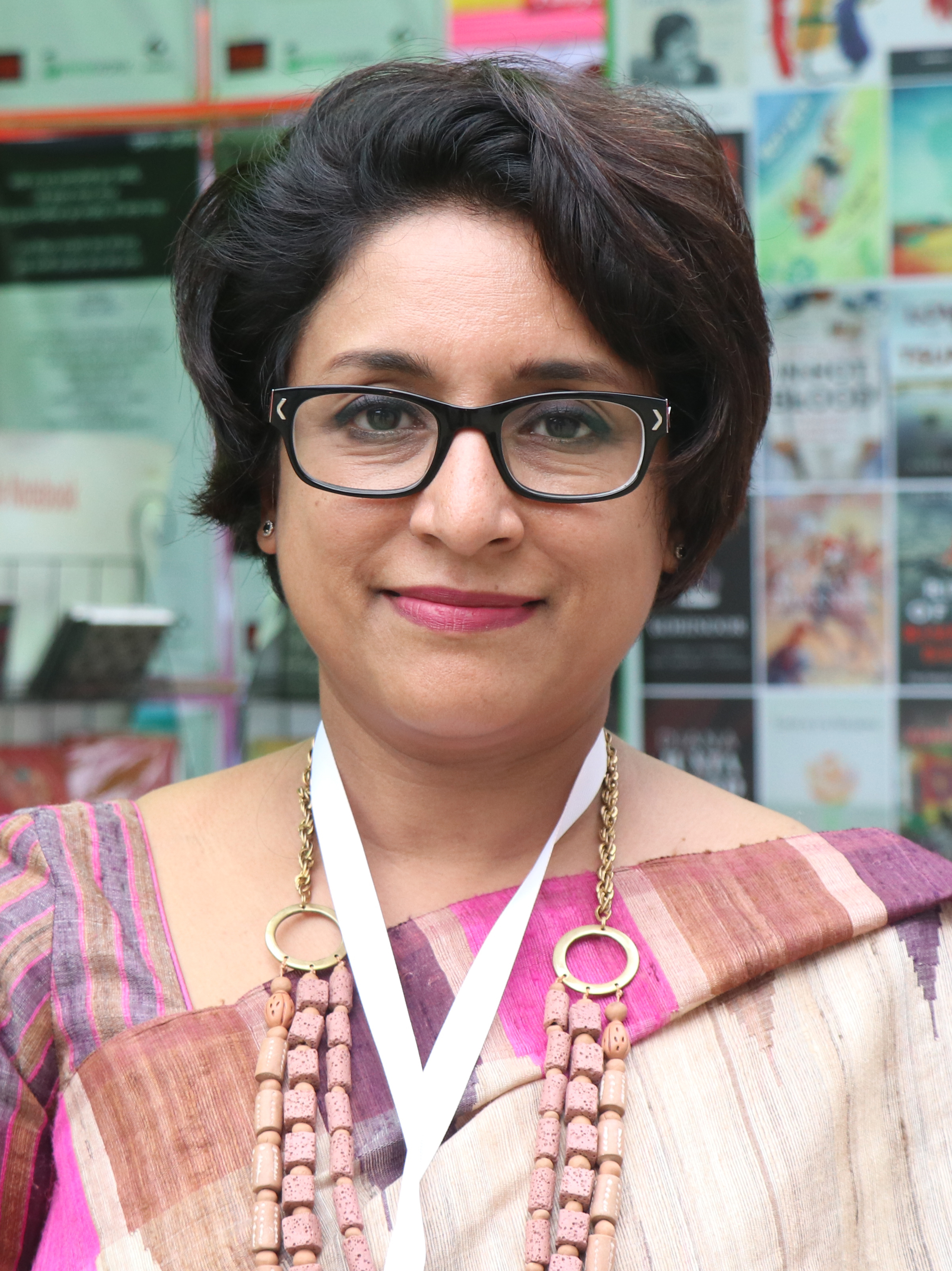
- Zaman in Dhaka Lit Fest 2017
- Education: SOAS, University of London
- Occupations: Film director, television presenter, producer
- Organization(s): Ekattor TV, Versa Media
- Known for: Journalist and film director
- Awards: Anannya Top Ten Awards (2008)

Samia Zaman is a Bangladeshi media personality, filmmaker, and producer. She was a television news presenter, reporter, and talk show host. In 2006, she emerged as a film director. She also serves as the editor and CEO of the television channel Ekattor TV.

== Career ==
In 1989, Zaman started out her career as a producer at the BBC World Service in London. Zaman served as a journalist and news presenter at Ekushey Television.

=== Films ===
In 1987, Zaman was an assistant on the film Suchona with director Morshedul Islam. In 2006, she emerged as a filmmaker through her direction on the film Rani Kuthir Baki Itihash. She directed her second film, Aakash Koto Dure, in 2014.

In March 2015, Zaman served on the judge panel of the Geneva International Oriental Film Festival.

In 2024, Zaman produced the film Ajob Karkhana (2024), which was directed by Shabnam Ferdousi, and produced under her own banner, Versa Media.

== Personal life ==
Zaman has three daughters.

== Awards ==
- Anannya Top Ten Awards (2008)
