= Sharmili Ahmed =

Bangladeshi actress (1947–2022)

- শর্মিলী আহমেদ
- Born: Majeda Mullick; 8 May 1947; Murshidabad, Province of Bengal, British India
- Died: 8 July 2022 (aged 75); Dhaka, Bangladesh
- Education: University of Rajshahi
- Occupations: Actress and key opinion leader
- Years active: 1962–2022
- Spouse: Rakibuddin Ahmed (m. 1968)
- Children: Tanima
- Father: Tofazzal Hossain
- Relatives: Wahida Mollick Jolly (sister)

Sharmili Ahmed (8 May 1947 – 8 July 2022) was a Bangladeshi television and film actress. In a career spanning more than 50 years, she acted in nearly 400 films and 150 television programs. Her notable works were Malancha, Dompoti, Agun, Abirvaab, Poush Phaguner Pala, Meherjaan, Abar Hawa Bodol (2014), Brishtir Pore (2005), Amader Ananda Bari (2005), Anchol (2006), Aguntuk (2005), Poshak (2005), Chheleti (2011), Uposhonghar (2010), Chena Manusher Panchalee (2007), and Dhupchhaya (2009).

== Early life and education ==
Majeda Mullick was born on 8 May 1947 in Belur Chok village, Murshidabad in the then Province of Bengal, British India to Md Tofazzal Hossain and Anwara Khatun. Tofazzal was a government service holder and also achieved the "Master of Drama Award" by the then-Deputy Commissioner of North Bengal and was honored with a gold medal. She was the eldest among six siblings. Her younger sister, Wahida Mollick Jolly, a theatre actor and activist.

Mullick passed matriculation examination from Rajshahi PN Girls High School and completed her bachelor's from the University of Rajshahi.

== Career ==
Ahmed started her career as a radio announcer and drama artiste in Rajshahi Radio in 1962. She made her debut as a film actress in 1964 and as a television actress in 1968. She started her acting career through Urdu films. Her first film was Jugnu and she went on to act in three more, Ujala, Panchi Baura and Thikana. Her first Bengali film was Abirbhab, directed by Subhash Dutta, music composed by Satya Saha and co-acted by Kabori Sarwar, Azim, Abdur Razzak, Anwar Hossain.

Ahmed worked in Dompoti, the first ever drama serial on Bangladesh Television. She acted in a mother role for the first time in the film Agun, directed by Mohammad Mohsin in 1976.

== Works ==
=== Television ===
- Atoshi (1999)
- Malancha
- Dompoti
- Brishtir Porey (2005)
- Amader Anando Bari (2005)
- Aguntuk (2005)
- Poshak (2005)
- Anchol (2006)
- Chena Manusher Panchalee (2007)
- Dhupchhaya (2009)
- Uposhonghar (2010)
- Poush Phaguner Pala (2011)
- Chheleti (2011)
- Abar Hawa Bodol (2014)

=== Films ===
- Jugnoo (1968)
- Shuorani Duorani (1968)
- Abirbhab (1968) - Luna Chowdhury
- Alingon (1969)
- Polatok (1973)
- Agun (1976)
- Bashundhara (1977) - Chhobi's Sister in Law
- Rupali Shoikote (1979)
- Aradhona (1979) - Parul
- Emiler Goyenda Bahini (1980)
- Ashar Alo (1982)
- Dahan (1985) - Asma / Mrs. Mostak
- Premik (1985)
- Hushiar (1988)
- Laal Golap
- Beyadob
- Streer Paona (1991) - Kabir's Mother
- Tyag (1993) - Rayhan's Mother
- Bikkhov (1994) - Zihad's Mother
- Prem Juddho (1994)
- Tomake Chai (1996) - Sagor's Mother
- Hangor Nodi Grenade (1997)
- Ami Tomari (1999)
- Sobaito Sukhi Hote Chai (2000)
- Dhawa (2000)
- Milon Hobe Koto Dine (2002)
- Swami Chhintai (2004)
- Amar Swapno Tumi (2005) - Shahed's Mother
- Mohabbat Zindabad (2005)
- Bhalobasha Bhalobasha (2006)
- Na Bolona (2006)
- Chachchu (2006)
- Judge Er Raye Fashi (2007)
- Jhontu Montu Dui Bhai (2007)
- Dukhini Zohora (2007)
- Tip Tip Brishty (2008)
- Akash Chhowa Bhalobasha (2008)
- Swami Niye Juddho (2008)
- Golapi Ekhon Bilatey (2010)
- Matir Thikana (2011)
- Meherjaan (2011) - Meher's Mother
- Moner Jala (2011)
- Se Amar Mon Kereche (2012)
- Akash Koto Dure (2014)
- 71 Er Maa Jononi (2014)
- Prem Korbo Tomar Sathe (2014)
- Swargo Theke Norok (2015)
- Ochena Hridoy (2015)
- Ek Prithibi Prem (2016)
- Raat Jaga Phool (2021)

== Awards ==
- Bachsas award (1985)
- Ritwik Ghatak Golden Award
- Anannya Award
- Alokito Nari Award
- Syed Mahidul Islam Memorial Award

== Personal life and death ==
Ahmed was married to Rakibuddin Ahmed (1932-1996), the then principal of a polytechnic institute, since 1968. They had a daughter, Tanima Ahmed.

Ahmed died from cancer on 8 July 2022, at the age of 75. (Note: There is some confusion with her death place. The Daily Star reported that she died at her home in Uttara. The Business Standard reported that she died at Evercare Hospital in Dhaka.)
