= Walaa Hussein =

Palestine footballer (born 1989)

Walaa Hussein ولاء حسين
Personal information
- Full name: Walaa Ghassan Awad Hussein
- Date of birth: 20 March 1989 (age 37)
- Place of birth: Sha'ab, Israel
- Position: Forward

Senior career*
Years	Team	Apps	(Gls)
2006–2008	Bnot Sakhnin		(10)
2008–2009	Hapoel Petah Tikva		(9)
2009–2010	Maccabi Tzur Shalom		(9)
2010–2011	Diyar Bethlehem		
2011–2013	Ramat Hasharon		(31)
2013–2014	Hapoel Petah Tikva		(10)
2014–2015	Ramat Hasharon		(4)
2015–2016	Maccabi Holon		(16)
2016–2017	Kiryat Gat		(4)
2017–2019	Hapoel Be'er Sheva		(43)
2019–2020	Maccabi Holon		(3)
2020–2022	Hapoel Marmorek		(23)

International career
2007	Israel U19	3	(1)
2008–	Palestine		(8)
- * Club domestic league appearances and goals

Walaa Ghassan Hussein (Arabic: ولاء حسين; born 20 March 1989) is a footballer who plays as a forward. Born in Israel, she plays for the Palestine national team.

== Club career ==
In the 2017–18 season, Hussein won the second division title with Hapoel Be'er Sheva and was crowned top scorer with 35 goals.

== International career ==
Hussein previously played for the Israeli under-19 women's team before she got an invitation to join the first Palestinian women's team. Hussein played during the 2014 WAFF Championship, scoring two goals against Bahrain. She was called up to the senior team for the 2010 Arabia Women's Cup in Bahrain. She helped Palestine achieve the biggest victory in its history, when she netted five goals to hand an 18–0 defeat to Qatar.

== Personal life ==
She studied physiotherapy at the Arab American University in Jenin. A German documentary "Kick it, Walaa!" was produced in 2013 about her football career.

== Career statistics ==
Scores and results list Palestine's goal tally first, score column indicates score after each Hussein goal.

List of international goals scored by Walaa Hussein
No.	Date	Venue	Opponent	Score	Result	Competition
	20 October 2010	Al Ahli Stadium, Manama, Bahrain	Qatar	–	18–0	2010 Arabia Women's Cup
	20 October 2010	Al Ahli Stadium, Manama, Bahrain	Qatar	–	18–0	2010 Arabia Women's Cup
	20 October 2010	Al Ahli Stadium, Manama, Bahrain	Qatar	–	18–0	2010 Arabia Women's Cup
	20 October 2010	Al Ahli Stadium, Manama, Bahrain	Qatar	–	18–0	2010 Arabia Women's Cup
	20 October 2010	Al Ahli Stadium, Manama, Bahrain	Qatar	–	18–0	2010 Arabia Women's Cup
6	17 April 2014	Petra Stadium, Amman, Jordan	Bahrain	3–0	4–0	2014 WAFF Women's Championship
7	17 April 2014	Petra Stadium, Amman, Jordan	Bahrain	4–0	4–0	2014 WAFF Women's Championship

== Honours ==
Diyar Bethlehem

- Palestinian League: 2010–11

Hapoel Be'er Sheva

- Leumit League: 2017–18
