= Syria national football team results =

This article details the fixtures and results of the Syria national football team.

== Best and worst results ==
=== Best ===
As of 26 March 2024

Number	Year	Opponent	Result
1	1965	Oman	13 – 0
2	1997	Maldives	12 – 0
3	1997	Maldives	12 – 0
4	2001	Philippines	12 – 0
5	2001	Laos	11 – 0
6	2001	Laos	9 – 0
7	2003	Sri Lanka	8 – 0
8	1993	Chinese Taipei	8 – 1
9	2007	Indonesia	7 – 0
10	2024	Myanmar	7 – 0

=== Worst ===
As of 26 March 2024

Number	Year	Opponent	Result
1	1949	Greece	0 – 8
2	1951	Egypt	0 – 8
3	1949	Turkey	0 – 7
4	2004	Iran	1 – 7
5	1966	China	0 – 6
6	2016	Japan	0 – 5
7	2019	Iran	0 – 5
8	2023	Japan	0 – 5
9	2025	Japan	0 – 5

== Results ==
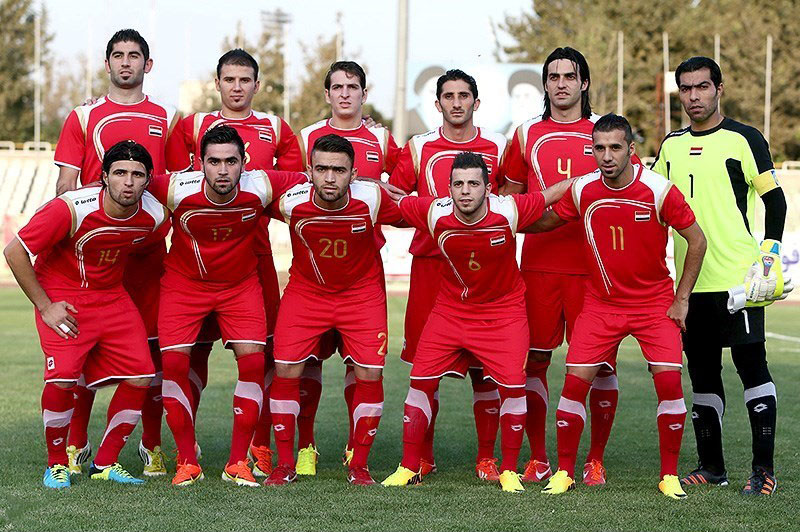
Syria national football team in Tehran – 2015 AFC Asian Cup qualification

== Results by year ==
Year	Pld	W	D	L	GF	GA	GD
2015	10	8	1	1	28	11	+17
2016	13	5	4	4	13	11	+2
2017	12	3	7	2	16	14	+2
2018	9	3	4	2	10	10	0
2019	20	7	5	8	28	29	−1
2020	2	1	0	1	1	1	0
2021	13	3	2	8	17	21	−4
2022	11	2	1	8	7	14	−7
2023	8	3	1	4	8	12	−4
2024	15	5	5	5	20	18	+2
2025	12	7	3	5	23	8	+15
Total	125	47	33	41	171	149	+21

== See also ==
- Syria national football team head-to-head record
- Syria women's national football team results

== Bibliography ==
- worldfootball.net
