= Ajob Karkhana =

2022 Bangladeshi film

- Film poster
- Bengali: আজব কারখানা
- Directed by: Shabnam Ferdousi
- Written by: Shabnam Ferdousi
- Produced by: Samia Zaman
- Starring: Parambrata Chatterjee; Shabnaz Sadia Emi; Dilruba Doyel; Khalid Hasan Rumi
- Cinematography: Enamul Haq Sohel
- Edited by: Sankhajit Biswas; Rakib Rana
- Music by: Labik Kamal Gaurob
- Production company: Versa Media
- Release dates: January 2022 (DIFF); 12 July 2024 (Bangladesh)
- Running time: 122 minutes
- Country: Bangladesh
- Language: Bengali

Ajob Karkhana (Bengali: আজব কারখানা, also known as Song of the Soul in English) is a 2022 Bangladeshi musical drama film written and directed by Shabnam Ferdousi and produced by Samia Zaman. It is the debut fictional film for Ferdousi, who is known as a documentary filmmaker. The film was made with a grant from the Bangladeshi government.

The film stars Kolkata actor Parambrata Chatterjee as a rock star, Rajib. Fashion model Shabnaz Sadia Emi makes her big screen debut as Rajib's girlfriend, a model. Chatterjee described most of the supporting cast as musicians more than actors. The music was composed by Labik Kamal Gaurob, the band Seven Minutes, and Tonmoy Tansen of the Bangladeshi band Vikings.

== Plot ==
Rajib, a popular young rockstar, is offered to host a folk music TV show. Though hesitant at first, he agrees after a producer’s persuasion. Traveling to rural areas to meet Baul musicians, he finds new meaning in life and shifts from rock to folk music.

== Cast ==
- Parambrata Chatterjee as rock star Rajib
- Shabnaz Sadia Emi
- Dilruba Doyel
- Khalid Hasan Rumi
- Helim Boyati
- Dilu Boyati
- Kitab Ali
- Cristiano Tanmoy
- Arpan
- Maimuna Mom
- Mahreen Manya

== Production ==
The film received a government grant of 50 lakh Bangladeshi taka ($64,000 as of 2016) in the 2016-17 fiscal year. Filming began in 2019. Post-production work was protracted due to the COVID-19 pandemic.

== Music ==
Labik Kamal Gaurob composed the background music and one of the film's five original rock songs. The band Seven Minutes composed one song, and Tonmoy Tansen of the Bangladeshi band Vikings composed the other three. The lyrics of the songs come from poems by Helal Hafiz.

== Release ==
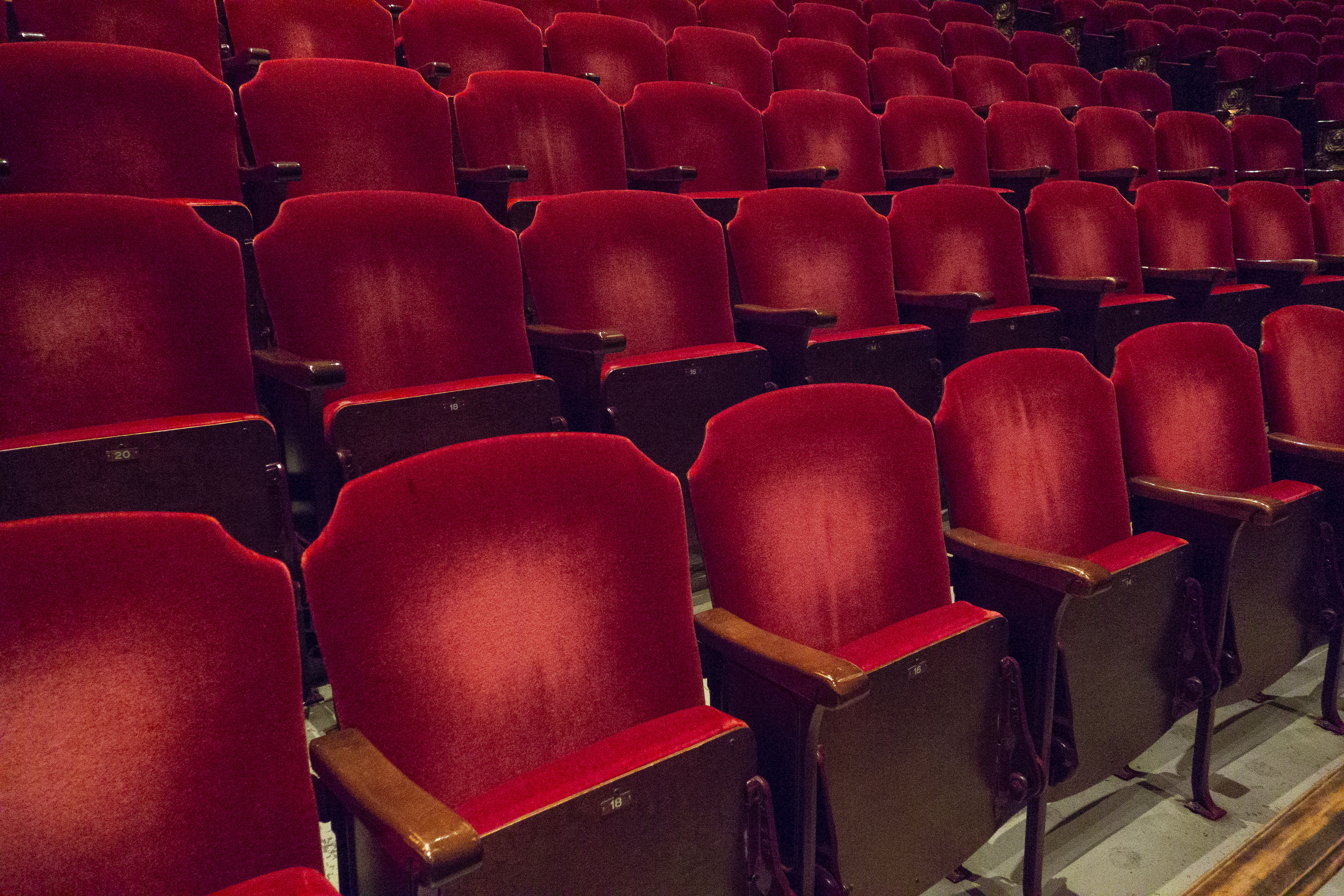
Attempts to quell civil unrest in Bangladesh closed theaters days after the film was released.

The film premiered at the Dhaka International Film Festival in January 2022, before appearing at various other film festivals.

Ajob Karkhana received its domestic Bangladeshi release on 12 July 2024 in five theaters: four in Dhaka and one in Chittagong. Its release was interrupted by the violent crackdown on the 2024 Bangladesh quota reform movement. There were no screenings of the film on 18 or 19 July, and all cinema halls closed starting on 20 July. By September, the security situation in the country improved, after which the film returned to a multiplex in Dhaka and expanded to a theater in Narayanganj.

== Awards ==
The film won the FIPRESCI award in the Panorama section of the 20th Dhaka International Film Festival. The three-member jury was made up of Egyptian film critic Mohamed Sayed Abdelrehim, Indian film critic Siraj Hashim Syed, and Bangladeshi film critic Bidhan Rebeiro.
