= Rani Kuthir Baki Itihash =

2006 film by Samia Zaman

- VCD cover
- Directed by: Samia Zaman
- Written by: Dewan Shamsur Rakib
- Produced by: NTV
- Starring: Ferdous; Popy; Alamgir; Tarik Anam Khan; Ahsanul Haque Minu; Rahamat Ali; MM Morshed; Arunav Anjan
- Cinematography: Maksudul Bari
- Edited by: Junayed Halim
- Music by: SI Tutul
- Distributed by: NTV
- Release date: 6 June 2006
- Running time: 96 mins
- Country: Bangladesh
- Language: Bengali

Rani Kuthir Baki Itihash (Bengali: রানী কুঠির বাকী ইতিহাস) is a 2006 Bangladeshi drama-mystery film. The film was the directorial debut of news anchor and prominent media personality Samia Zaman. It was produced by a Bangladeshi satellite TV channel NTV. The film was their second film production. The movie starred Ferdous and Popy as the lead pair with Alamgir, Tarik Anam Khan, Rahamat Ali, MM Morshed, Ahsanul Haque Minu and others in supporting roles.

== Plot ==
A newlywed couple move to a new house in a remote location. Momo, the wife keeps sensing something familiar about the house. In order to find the truth, she must look into the past.

== Cast ==
- Ferdous - Rudra
- Popy - Momo
- Alamgir
- Tarik Anam Khan -
- Rahamat Ali -
- Arunav Anjan -
- MM Morshed -
- Ahsanul Haque Minu -

== Accolades ==
=== National Film Awards ===
- Won Best Singer - Asif Akbar 2006 for "Amar Majhe Nei Ekhon Ami"
- Won Best Singer Samina Chowdhury 2006 for "Amar Majhe Nei Ekhon Ami"

== Music ==
The soundtrack for the film Rani Kuthir Baki Itihash all Song lyrics by Kabir Bakul with music composed and directed by the singer SI Tutul.

=== Track listing ===
No.	Title	Artist(s)	Length
1.	"Amar Majhe Nei Ekhon Ami"	Asif Akbar & Samina Chowdhury	6:11
2.	"Shopno Tumi Shotti Tumi"	Asif Akbar & Samina Choudhury	5:35
