= Mahooz =

- Neighborhood
- Location in Bahrain
- Coordinates: 26°12.28′N 50°35.14′E
- Country: Bahrain
- Governorate: Capital Governorate

Mahooz is a neighborhood situated in Manama, in the Kingdom of Bahrain.

== History ==
The grave and shrine of the 13th century Shia theologian Maitham Al Bahrani is located in Mahooz.

The Ministry of Interior's General Directorate of Forensic Science Evidence was formerly based in the area until 2010, before it was relocated to Hamad Town.

== Geography ==
The Mahooz area lies south of the Adliya district of Manama, east of Bu Ashira, north of Umm Al Hassam, and west of Juffair.Mahooz is home to the Umm Al Shaoum freshwater spring (Arabic: عين أم شعوم), Bahrain's second largest freshwater spring after Adhari spring. It was closed in 2020 due to the COVID-19 pandemic in Bahrain and later underwent renovations before re-opening in 2024. The park incorporate a land area of 5,319 square metres, and its facilities include a public swimming pool and recreational facilities for families.
