= Abeer Abu Ghaith =

Palestinian entrepreneur

- Born: October 4, 1984 (age 42); Madaba, Jordan
- Education: John F. Kennedy School of Government, Palestine Polytechnic University, Birkbeck, University of London
- Occupations: technology entrepreneur, social activist
- Website: menaalliances.com

Abeer Abu Ghaith (Arabic: عبير أبو غيث) (born October 4, 1984) is a Palestinian technology entrepreneur and social activist. She is the founder of MENA Alliances and formally a co-founder of StayLinked. Abu Ghaith has been celebrated as "Palestine's first female high-tech entrepreneur." She uses technology to provide jobs to people living in "fragile" regions, such as Gaza.

== Biography ==
Abeer Abu Ghaith was born on October 4, 1984 to a Bedouin family in Madaba Camp, and lived there until the age of 12. In 1996, her family moved to Gaza, and in 1997, to Dura, Hebron. She is the second eldest of 9 siblings.

Abu Ghaith attended Palestine Polytechnic University from 2002 until 2007, and received her B.A. degree in computer systems engineering in 2007. After her graduation, she started to teach on campus. This was followed by work as the Country Director of the Women's Campaign International (WCI) and their program ALWANE.

In 2013, Abu Ghaith co-founded the company StayLinked, a service providing talent from Palestinian freelancers for businesses located in the United States and in the Middle East. The job roles included translation services, data entry, graphic design, online marketing, and website development. After leaving StayLinked in 2015, Abu Ghaith formed MENA Alliances, which does similar work in job placement.

In 2016, Abu Ghaith attended the John F. Kennedy School of Government at Harvard University as a member of The Goldman Sachs 10,000 Women-U.S. Department of State Entrepreneurship Program for Women in the Middle East and North Africa. From 2017 to 2018, she continued her studies at Birkbeck College, University of London, and in 2018 she received a M.S. degree in business innovation. After graduation she returned to her work with MENA Alliances, where she is CEO and founder.

== Awards ==
- 2019: "The Big Innovation Prize for the Best Dissertation in Innovation", University of London
- 2015: "100 Powerful Arab under 40", Arabian Business magazine
- 2015: "The 100 Most Powerful Arab Women 2015", Arabian Business magazine
- 2014: "The 100 Most Powerful Arab Women 2014", Arabian Business magazine
- 2014: "Best Technology Enabler and Facilitator" award, MEA Women in Technology Awards
- 2014: "100 Most Powerful Arab Women", CEO Middle East magazine
