= Abir Sultan =

Israeli photographer (born 1987)

Abir Sultan אביר סולטן
- Born: 1985 (age 40–41); Israel
- Known for: photography
- Movement: Israeli art, photojournalism
- Website: www.abirsultan.com

Abir Sultan (Hebrew: אביר סולטן; born 1985) is an Israeli photographer.

== Biography ==
Sultan was born in Israel in 1985. He began to work as a photographer in the Israeli Army's Spokesperson's Unit, documenting Israeli events such as the disengagement of the Jewish settlements from Gaza, Second Lebanon War, and fighting in Gaza. After completing his military service, Sultan worked as a freelancer for Bluepress agency Yedioth Ahronoth newspaper. Sultan started to work in the Jerusalem based agency Flash90, providing photos for the Maariv newspaper. His photographs were published in newspapers and magazines around the world, including the Los Angeles Times, The New York Times, Le Monde, The Irish Times and Stern. Sultan is currently a staff photographer for the European Pressphoto Agency.

== Exhibitions ==
=== Group ===
- 2009. "Chroniques Orientales". Polka Galerie, Paris.
- 2010. World Press Photo.
- 2012. Local Testimony 2012. Eretz Israel Museum.
- 2014. Tel Aviv Photo 2014. Pavilion 16. Tel Aviv.
- 2015. Local Testimony 2015. Eretz Israel Museum.

== Awards ==
- 2014. Best Photos. EPA Awards.
- 2015. First Prize. Society and Community category. Local Testimony 2015.
- 2015. Nomination. Joop Swart Masterclass.
