= Abeer Al-Nahar =

Jordanian footballer (born 1991)

Personal information
- Full name: Abeer Mahmoud Mubarak Al-Nahar
- Date of birth: 13 February 1991 (age 35)
- Place of birth: Amman, Jordan
- Height: 1.58 m (5 ft 2 in)
- Position: Forward

Team information
- Current team: Amman Club

International career^{‡}
Years	Team	Apps	(Gls)
2009–2019	Jordan	43	(26)
- ‡ National team caps and goals as of 13 January 2019

Abeer Mahmoud Mubarak Al-Nahar (Arabic: عبير النهار; born 13 February 1991) is a Jordanian international footballer who plays as a forward.

== Club career ==
In May 2015 Al-Nahar played for Amman Club in a 5–3 win over rivals Shabab Al-Ordon, which secured the Jordan Women's Football League title.

== International career ==
As a 15-year-old Al-Nahar was included in the Jordan national team squad who were beaten 13–0 by Japan at the 2006 Asian Games in Doha.

In 2011 Al-Nahar and her father were outspoken critics of FIFA's ban on hijabs. Two years later she got six goals as Jordan "hammered" Kuwait 21–0 in 2014 AFC Women's Asian Cup qualification.

During Jordan's victorious 2014 WAFF Women's Championship campaign, Al-Nahar scored four goals in a 7–0 win over Qatar and finished as the tournament top scorer. At the 2014 Asian Games she was shown a red card in Jordan's 2–2 draw with Chinese Taipei.

== International goals ==
No.	Date	Venue	Opponent	Score	Result	Competition
1.	29 April 2009	KLFA Stadium, Kuala Lumpur, Malaysia	Maldives	1–0	9–0	2010 AFC Women's Asian Cup qualification
2.	29 April 2009	KLFA Stadium, Kuala Lumpur, Malaysia	Maldives	3–0	9–0	2010 AFC Women's Asian Cup qualification
3.	29 April 2009	KLFA Stadium, Kuala Lumpur, Malaysia	Maldives	7–0	9–0	2010 AFC Women's Asian Cup qualification
4.	11 February 2013	Tehran, Iran	Iran	1–?	1–2	Friendly
5.	1 April 2013	King Abdullah II Stadium, Amman, Jordan	Palestine	3–0	4–0	Friendly
6.	7 June 2013	Amman International Stadium, Amman, Jordan	Kuwait	6–0	21–0	2014 AFC Women's Asian Cup qualification
7.	7 June 2013	Amman International Stadium, Amman, Jordan	Kuwait	11–0	21–0	2014 AFC Women's Asian Cup qualification
8.	7 June 2013	Amman International Stadium, Amman, Jordan	Kuwait	14–0	21–0	2014 AFC Women's Asian Cup qualification
9.	7 June 2013	Amman International Stadium, Amman, Jordan	Kuwait	16–0	21–0	2014 AFC Women's Asian Cup qualification
10.	7 June 2013	Amman International Stadium, Amman, Jordan	Kuwait	20–0	21–0	2014 AFC Women's Asian Cup qualification
11.	7 June 2013	Amman International Stadium, Amman, Jordan	Kuwait	21–0	21–0	2014 AFC Women's Asian Cup qualification
12.	3 September 2013	Laos National Stadium, Vientiane, Laos	Laos	1–0	5–0	Friendly
13.	17 April 2014	Petra Stadium, Amman, Jordan	Qatar	1–0	7–0	2014 WAFF Women's Championship
14.	17 April 2014	Petra Stadium, Amman, Jordan	Qatar	2–0	7–0	2014 WAFF Women's Championship
15.	17 April 2014	Petra Stadium, Amman, Jordan	Qatar	3–0	7–0	2014 WAFF Women's Championship
16.	17 April 2014	Petra Stadium, Amman, Jordan	Qatar	6–0	7–0	2014 WAFF Women's Championship
17.	31 August 2014	Alexandria Stadium, Alexandria, Egypt	Egypt	1–0	2–0	Friendly
18.	9 February 2017	Petra Stadium, Amman, Jordan	Algeria	2–1	2–1	Friendly
19.	12 February 2017	Petra Stadium, Amman, Jordan	Algeria	2–3	2–3	Friendly
20.	10 April 2017	Pamir Stadium, Dushanbe, Tajikistan	Tajikistan	10–2	10–2	2018 AFC Women's Asian Cup qualification
21.	31 July 2017	Bosnia and Herzegovina FA Training Centre, Zenica, Bosnia & Herzegovina	Bosnia and Herzegovina	2–2	2–4	Friendly
22.	8 November 2018	Faisal Al-Husseini International Stadium, Al-Ram, Palestine	Maldives	1–0	6–0	2020 AFC Women's Olympic Qualifying Tournament
23.	11 November 2018	Faisal Al-Husseini International Stadium, Al-Ram, Palestine	Palestine	6–0	7–0	2020 AFC Women's Olympic Qualifying Tournament
24.	13 November 2018	Faisal Al-Husseini International Stadium, Al-Ram, Palestine	Indonesia	2–0	3–0	2020 AFC Women's Olympic Qualifying Tournament
25.	13 January 2019	Al-Muharraq Stadium, Muharraq, Bahrain	Palestine	1–0	3–0	2019 WAFF Women's Championship
