= Shabnam Ferdousi =

Bangladeshi film maker

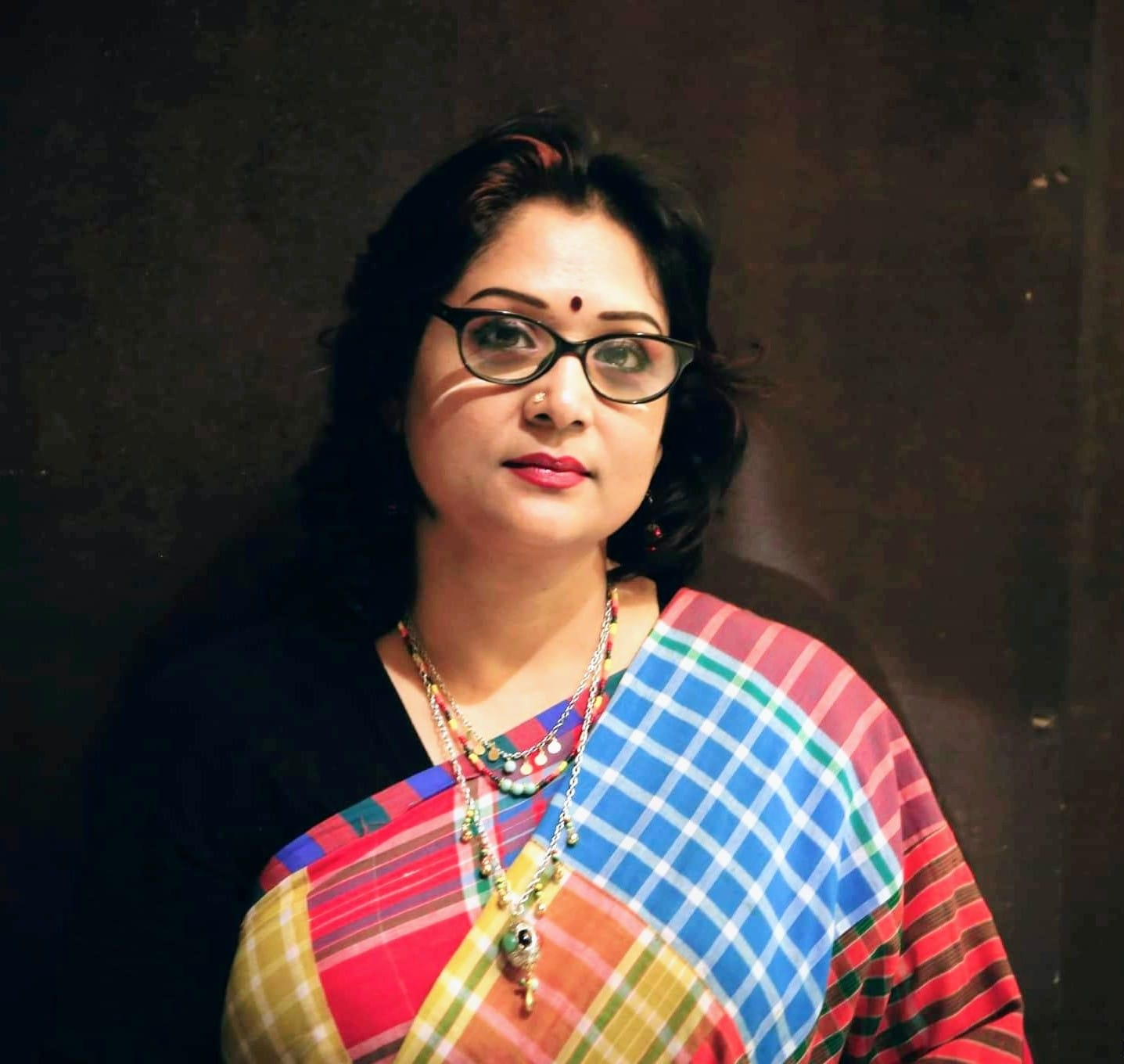
- Born: 15 January 1972 (age 54)
- Education: University of Dhaka
- Occupation: Film maker

Shabnam Ferdousi, a Bangladeshi film maker and film activist, is working in different sectors of audio-visual media for the last 28 years. She made about 40 documentary films. She has done many feature shows, infotainment programs, talk shows for various TV channels and organizations. She worked as an executive producer more than 100 documentary films for Ekattor TV, ATN News and Jamuna Television. She is also known as a news presenter and TV show presenter. She has been working as the Head of Program in Ekattor TV for the last 12 years.

She achieved 10 film awards along with the National Film Award of Bangladesh Govt. in 2016 for her documentary film Born Together. She also got the prestigious FIPRESCI award for her debut fiction "Song of the Soul" in 2022. She has been awarded government funding for her debut fiction film Ajob Karkhana (Song of the Soul) in 2017. The movie Ajob Karkhana directed by Shabnam was released on 12 July 2024.

== Education and career ==
Ferdousi graduated from the University of Dhaka. She entered in audio-visual world as a model in TV commercials back in 1995 with Asiatic MCL, one of the largest advertising agencies of Bangladesh. In 1996, she joined Zahir Raihan Film Society. She is the member of Bangladesh Short Film Forum since 1999 and organized a national film fest in her hometown Tangail in 2000. During the same year, she participated in the first documentary film making course in Bangladesh organized by Steps Towards Development and started her career as a documentary film maker. In 2004, she started documentary film movement as the convener of Bangladesh Documentary Council and arranged four national film festivals, seminars, film making workshops nationally and internationally. She is one of the major activists and film makers in New Wave Documentary Film movement in Bangladesh. Her major contribution is producing documentary films in television for the first time in Bangladesh with young film makers.

T

== Film activism ==
- President and Convener of Bangladesh Documentary Council
- Ex joint secretary and lifetime member of Bangladesh Short Film Forum

== Awards ==
- Best Debut Film Award, 8th Jaffna International Cinema Festival, Shrilanka (2023)
- FIPRESCI best film award in DIFF for Song of the Soul (2022)
- National Award in Best Documentary Film for Born Together (2016)
- Inspiring Woman in Film Award by WilFest (2018)
- Best Documentary Film on 16th Dhaka International Film Festival (2017)
- Special Jury Mention Award in Bodhisattva International Film Festival, Patna, India (2017)
- Best Shorts Award in 15th Rainbow International Film Festival, London (2014)
- Bangladesh Shilpakala Academy & Moviyana Film Society Award (2013)
- Anannya Top 10 (2009)
- Bangladesh Mahila Parishad (2007)

== Major films ==
- Born Together (Jonmoshathi) (2016) – 72-minute documentary film on war babies of Bangladesh. (2016). Produced by Ekattor.tv and Liberation War Museum of Bangladesh.
- O'de Love (2017) – 25-minute documentary on the conception of love affair between a young man and a woman. Produced by Ekattor.tv
- ...and we cross the same road (2006) – A 49-minute documentary film on the street beggars of Bangladesh. (2006). Produced by Impress Telefilm Ltd.
- Titas Ekti Nodir Naam (A River called Titas) (2009) – A 25-minute documentary on the livelihood of traditional fishermen at the bank of river Titas. Also, a reconstruction of the film and novel Titas Ekti Nodir Naam by Ritwik Ghatak. Produced by Jamuna Television Ltd.
- Porramatir Gondho (2010) – A 21-minute documentary film on Bangladeshi brick kiln and air pollution in our land. Produced by Jamuna Television Ltd.
- BishKabbyo (The Poison Tellars) (2012) – A 24-minute documentary on insecticides seller and a parallel story of underprivileged urban people. Produced by Ekattor.tv
- ShohorKabbyo (The City Song) (2012) – A 28-minute documentary film on the new urban middle class and their identity crisis (2012). Produced by Ekattor.tv
- NonaKabbyo ( The Salt Saga) (2012) – A 20-minute documentary film on a single mother who raises her daughter and challenges of her life with an emotional crisis. Produced by Ekattor.tv
- Naa Premik, Naa Biplobee (Nor Lover, Neither Rebel) (2013) – A documentary film on a young generation and their thoughts and crisis. Produced by Ekattor.TV
- Dhushor Pandulipi (2018) – A 20-minute documentary on how Poetry and Poets are consuming in this time. Produced by Ekattor TV
- Agunkhela (2017) – An 18-minute short documentary based on urban slum area torched in fire. Produced by Ekattor.TV
- Kaljug (2018) – A documentary film on a martyr freedom fighter Colonel Huda and the military coup in 1975. Produced by ekattor TV.
- Kalantor (2019) – Another documentary on the military coup on 7 November 1975. Produced by Ekattor TV
- Unmesh (2019) – A documentary film on a dedicated leftist political activist. (2019)
- Iccha Bashanta (Spring of Desire) (2003) – based on the transgender lifestyle and their emotional and identity crisis. Self-produced.

== International film ==
Let Them Eat Cake – A global film directed and produced by Alexis Krasilovsky, renowned for her international production 'Women Behind the Camera'). Shabnam was the co-producer and director from Bangladesh part. (2008–2012)

== Funded films ==
- ShelaiGhor (The Seamstress House) (2013) – 60-minute documentary film on women participation in the most vibrant sector of Bangladesh garments industry. Produced by Steps Towards Development
- Ujjibon (The Rejuvenous) (2012) – 26-minute documentary film on renowned painter Syed Jahangir and his works. Produced by Bengal Foundation.
- AlokNaree (Lady with the Lamp) (2010) – 30-minute documentary film on the contribution of women in healthcare sector of Bangladesh in last 100 years. Produced by Steps Towards Development.
- Bhubon Bhora Shur (Melodies of the Soul) (2009) – 56-minute documentary film is based on the philosophical journey of Md. Anisur Rahman and Tagore song. Produced by Meghna Guhathakurta and Shipra Bose.
- Bhashajoyita (The Language Fighter) (2008) – 58-minute documentary film on women participation on in Language Movement of Bangladesh from 1947 to 1955. Produced by Steps Towards Development
- Water Play (2007) – 22-minute biographical documentary on eminent artist Alokesh Ghosh and his paintings. Produced by Bengal Foundation (2007).
- Twi-Light Colors (2006) – 21-minute biographical documentary on eminent artist Farida Zaman.
- Produced by Bengal Foundation
- In Quest of Life (2005) – based on a single and independent woman photographer how she survived and leading her own life. Produced by Steps Towards Development
- Noho Mata Noho Konnya (Mother & Daughter: Molested Lives) (2000–2001) – based on sexual harassment on women in Bangladesh. Produced by Steps Towards Development
- Opekkha( The Awaiting) (2000) – based on the mothers who are waiting in front of their children's school. Produced by Steps Towards Development.

== AV works ==
- Two TV spots for Bangladesh Television on Asrayon Prokolpo and Ekti Barri Ekti Khamar of 10 Initiatives of Prime Minister of Bangladesh

== Short fiction ==
- Two short fictions Uttoradhikar and Kushum on youth awareness raising program for American Embassy of Bangladesh. Commissioned by Expressions Ltd.

== Major commissioned AV works ==
- Documentary films on domestic violence against women for We Can Campaign project of Oxfam GB (2004)
- A documentary on first change makers conference of We Can Campaign project of Oxfam GB (2005)
- Two TV Spots on Election Campaigning Awareness, for Proshika MUK (2001)
- A Video documentary on Adolescent project (ALAP) for Concern Worldwide. (2007)
- A documentary on Eve Teasing and violence against Women (2006)
- A Video Productions on Women in Politics for STD (2006)
- Oggrodut – One documentary on Student Volunteers for Steps Towards Development. (2007)
- Diary of a Dreamer – A documentary on empowering adolescent girls for Stromme Foundation
- Bangladesh. (2010)
- Change Maker's Diary – A documentary on We Can Campaign progress and expansion of Oxfam GB (2010)
- Chokrobyuho – One video documentary on various level of domestic violence against women produced by We Can Campaign. (2014)
- 5 documentaries on beneficiaries of PROSHAR project under ACDI/VOCA supported by USAID (2015)
- 9 short documentaries on leadership of women under ACDI/VOCA supported by USAID and UN Women
- A documentary film on Early Marriage supported by We Can (2016)

== Major training and workshops ==
- A 4-months-long Video Documentary Film Making Workshop conducted by Steps Towards Development, Dhaka (2000). (With two course productions)
- A two-month-long Women Film Makers Workshop conducted by Steps Towards Development. (With one course production)
- An international Media Campaigning Material Development Workshop by Oxfam G.B. and Steps Towards Development, Dhaka (2004)
- A Film Making Workshop by Berlinale Talent Campus of Osian's Cinefan Film Festival of Asian and Arab Cinema. Delhi, India (2005)
- An international media related training by SAFMA, Karachi, Pakistan. (2006)
- An International event on Sexuality "Films of Desire" conducted by South Asian Sexuality and Resource Centre and TARASHI, Rajasthan, India (2007)

== Major film festival participation ==
Osian's Cinefan Film Festival of Asian and Arab Cinema Delhi, India. Asia Pacific Film Festival, Berlin, Germany."Films of Desire" Rajasthan, India. Globians Film Festival, Berlin, Germany.

JDCA Art and Artist Film Festival, Orissa, India. IWART Film Festival, Delhi, India

Kolkata International Film Festival, India. Himal South Asian Film Festival, Kathmandu, Nepal. International Rainbow Film Festival, London, England. Dhaka International Film Festival, Bangladesh. Bodhisattva International Film festival, Patna, India. IDSFFK International Documentary and Short Film Festival Kerala, India. (MIFF) Mumbai International Film Festival, India.International Short Film Festival, Dhaka, Bangladesh. 17th Tasveer Film festival, Seattle. USA. 19th South Asian International Film Festival, New York, USA. 19th Third Eye Asian Film Festival, Mumbai, India. 8th Jaffna International Cinema Festival, Shri Lanka. 17th FIFOG International Film Festival, Geneva, Switzerland. 23rd Rainbow International Film Festival, London, England. 2oth Pune International Film Festival, India. Thrissur International Film Festival, India. Nagpur International Film Festival. 27th Kokata International Film Festival, India.
