= Abeer Hamza =

- Education: Ain Shams University
- Occupation: Lecturer
- Writing career
- Genres: Arabic pedagogy, Comparative Arabic and Spanish literature

Abeer Hamza (Arabic: عبير حمزة) is a scholar and lecturer of Modern Standard Arabic and Egyptian Arabic in the Department of Near Eastern Languages and Cultures at the University of California, Los Angeles.

== Education and Teaching Experience ==
Hamza received Arabic instructor training from the University of Texas at Austin, and she received her Ph.D. from Ain Shams University in Cairo in 2000. She has taught courses there, was a visiting lecturer at Middlebury College, as well as a lecturer of Arabic and Spanish at California State University, Los Angeles before coming to UCLA.

== Current Position ==
She is currently the Arabic program coordinator at UCLA, and her responsibilities include assessing student competence in the language and creating complementary materials to enhance learning.

In addition to her native Arabic, she is also fluent in English and Spanish and has working knowledge of French.
