= Qatar national football team results (2000–2019) =

This article provides details of international football games played by the Qatar national football team from 2000 to 2019.

== 2000–09 ==
=== 2000 ===
20 January 2000 Friendly	Malta	2–0	Qatar

24 January 2000 Friendly	Qatar	2–0	Bosnia and Herzegovina

23 February 2000 Friendly	Qatar	0–1	Wales

10 March 2000 Friendly	Qatar	3–0	Sudan

31 March 2000 2000 AFC Asian Cup qualification	Qatar	1–0	Palestine	Doha, Qatar
	Mustafa 16'			Stadium: Al-Sadd Stadium

2 April 2000 2000 AFC Asian Cup qualification	Qatar	3–1	Kazakhstan	Doha, Qatar
	Nazmi 36'; Mustafa 39'; Al Enazi 73'		Avdeyev 82'	Stadium: Al-Sadd Stadium

4 April 2000 2000 AFC Asian Cup qualification	Qatar	5–0	Pakistan	Doha, Qatar
	Nazmi 25' (pen.), 85' (pen.); Al Kuwari 51', 73'; Hassan 68'			Stadium: Al-Sadd Stadium

8 April 2000 2000 AFC Asian Cup qualification	Qatar	2–2	Jordan	Doha, Qatar
	Al Kuwari 66'; Al Enazi 67'		Abu Zema 25'; Abdullah 45'	Stadium: Al-Sadd Stadium

2 June 2000 Friendly	Singapore	1–5	Qatar

10 June 2000 Friendly	Thailand	2–3	Qatar	Bangkok, Thailand
				Stadium: Rajamangala Stadium

24 September 2000 Friendly	Kuwait	0–0	Qatar

27 September 2000 Friendly	Qatar	1–2	Iran

2 October 2000 Friendly	Qatar	0–1	Egypt	United Arab Emirates

6 October 2000 Friendly	Qatar	1–1	Thailand

14 October 2000 2000 AFC Asian Cup	Qatar	1–1	Uzbekistan

17 October 2000 2000 AFC Asian Cup	Saudi Arabia	0–0	Qatar

20 October 2000 2000 AFC Asian Cup	Japan	1–1	Qatar

23 October 2000 2000 AFC Asian Cup	China	3–1	Qatar

=== 2001 ===
5 January 2001 Friendly	Qatar	3–1	Jordan

12 January 2001 Friendly	Qatar	1–0	Kuwait

10 February 2001 2001 King's Cup	China	1–1	Qatar

12 February 2001 2001 King's Cup	Qatar	3–1	Thailand

14 February 2001 2001 King's Cup	Sweden	0–0	Qatar

17 February 2001 2001 King's Cup	Qatar	0–2	Thailand

4 March 2001 2002 FIFA World Cup qualification	Qatar	5–1	Malaysia

8 March 2001 2002 FIFA World Cup qualification	Palestine	1–2	Qatar

11 March 2001 2002 FIFA World Cup qualification	Qatar	2–0	Hong Kong

20 March 2001 2002 FIFA World Cup qualification	Malaysia	0–0	Qatar

23 March 2001 2002 FIFA World Cup qualification	Qatar	2–1	Palestine

25 March 2001 2002 FIFA World Cup qualification	Hong Kong	0–3	Qatar

24 July 2001 Friendly	Qatar	1–0	Macedonia

1 August 2001 Friendly	Qatar	2–1	Iran

5 August 2001 Friendly	Saudi Arabia	1–2	Qatar

10 August 2001 Friendly	Qatar	1–1	Bahrain

16 August 2001 2002 FIFA World Cup qualification	Qatar	0–0	Oman

26 August 2001 2002 FIFA World Cup qualification	Uzbekistan	2–1	Qatar

31 August 2001 2002 FIFA World Cup qualification	United Arab Emirates	0–2	Qatar

7 September 2001 2002 FIFA World Cup qualification	Qatar	1–1	China

14 September 2001 Friendly	Qatar	0–0	Iraq

21 September 2001 2002 FIFA World Cup qualification	Oman	0–3	Qatar

28 September 2001 2002 FIFA World Cup qualification	Qatar	2–2	Uzbekistan

4 October 2001 2002 FIFA World Cup qualification	Qatar	1–2	United Arab Emirates

5 October 2001 Friendly	Bahrain	1–0	Qatar

13 October 2001 2002 FIFA World Cup qualification	China	3–0	Qatar

18 October 2001 Friendly	Kuwait	0–1	Qatar

30 December 2001 Friendly	Qatar	2–2	Egypt

=== 2002 ===
8 January 2002 Friendly	Qatar	0–2	Zimbabwe

13 January 2002 Friendly	Qatar	1–3	Iraq

17 January 2002 15th Arabian Gulf Cup	Qatar	1–0	Bahrain

19 January 2002 15th Arabian Gulf Cup	United Arab Emirates	0–2	Qatar

23 January 2002 15th Arabian Gulf Cup	Oman	1–2	Qatar

25 January 2002 15th Arabian Gulf Cup	Kuwait	0–1	Qatar

29 January 2002 15th Arabian Gulf Cup	Saudi Arabia	3–1	Qatar

10 February 2002 2002 King's Cup	Qatar	1–1	North Korea

12 February 2002 2002 King's Cup	Thailand	1–0	Qatar

14 February 2002 2002 King's Cup	Qatar	3–0	Singapore

16 February 2002 2002 King's Cup	Qatar	2–0	Singapore

=== 2003 ===
16 February 2003 2003 King's Cup	Sweden	3–2	Qatar

18 February 2003 2003 King's Cup	Thailand	1–1	Qatar

20 February 2003 2003 King's Cup	Qatar	2–2	North Korea

22 February 2003 2003 King's Cup	Qatar	1–3	Thailand

19 March 2003 Friendly	Egypt	6–0	Qatar

4 September 2003 Friendly	Qatar	0–1	Algeria

14 September 2003 2004 AFC Asian Cup qualification	Kuwait	2–1	Qatar

20 September 2003 2004 AFC Asian Cup qualification	Qatar	2–2	Kuwait

24 September 2003 2004 AFC Asian Cup qualification	Palestine	1–1	Qatar

27 September 2003 2004 AFC Asian Cup qualification	Qatar	2–1	Palestine

19 November 2003 2004 AFC Asian Cup qualification	Qatar	2–0	Singapore

29 November 2003 2004 AFC Asian Cup qualification	Singapore	0–2	Qatar

20 December 2003 Friendly	Qatar	0–0	Iraq

27 December 2003 16th Arabian Gulf Cup	Bahrain	0–0	Qatar

29 December 2003 16th Arabian Gulf Cup	Saudi Arabia	0–0	Qatar

=== 2004 ===
3 January 2004 16th Arabian Gulf Cup	United Arab Emirates	0–0	Qatar

5 January 2004 16th Arabian Gulf Cup	Qatar	3–0	Yemen

8 January 2004 16th Arabian Gulf Cup	Kuwait	1–2	Qatar

11 January 2004 16th Arabian Gulf Cup	Oman	2–0	Qatar

12 February 2004 Friendly	Qatar	2–0	Bahrain

18 February 2004 2006 FIFA World Cup qualification	Iran	3–1	Qatar

26 March 2004 Friendly	Libya	1–0	Qatar

31 March 2004 2006 FIFA World Cup qualification	Jordan	1–0	Qatar

31 May 2004 Friendly	Qatar	5–0	Turkmenistan

5 June 2004 Friendly	Qatar	0–0	Kyrgyzstan

9 June 2004 2006 FIFA World Cup qualification	Qatar	5–0	Laos

18 July 2004 2004 AFC Asian Cup	Qatar	1–2	Indonesia

21 July 2004 2004 AFC Asian Cup	Bahrain	1–1	Qatar

25 July 2004 2004 AFC Asian Cup	China	1–0	Qatar

8 September 2004 2006 FIFA World Cup qualification	Laos	1–6	Qatar

8 October 2004 Friendly	Qatar	1–2	Syria

13 October 2004 2006 FIFA World Cup qualification	Qatar	2–3	Iran

17 November 2004 2006 FIFA World Cup qualification	Qatar	2–0	Jordan

1 December 2004 Friendly	Qatar	4–1	Lebanon

5 December 2004 Friendly	Qatar	3–0	Yemen

10 December 2004 17th Arabian Gulf Cup	Qatar	2–2	United Arab Emirates

13 December 2004 17th Arabian Gulf Cup	Qatar	3–3	Iraq

16 December 2004 17th Arabian Gulf Cup	Qatar	2–1	Oman

20 December 2004 17th Arabian Gulf Cup	Kuwait	0–2	Qatar

24 December 2004 17th Arabian Gulf Cup	Oman	1–1	Qatar

=== 2005 ===
29 July 2005 Friendly	Egypt	5–0	Qatar

31 July 2005 Friendly	Qatar	1–0	Kuwait

11 October 2005 Friendly	Qatar	0–0	Iraq

16 November 2005 Friendly	Qatar	0–3	Argentina

=== 2006 ===
2 January 2006 Friendly	Qatar	2–0	Libya

14 February 2006 Friendly	Qatar	2–0	Tajikistan

22 February 2006 2007 AFC Asian Cup qualification	Hong Kong	0–3	Qatar

1 March 2006 2007 AFC Asian Cup qualification	Qatar	2–1	Uzbekistan

16 August 2006 2007 AFC Asian Cup qualification	Bangladesh	1–4	Qatar

6 September 2006 2007 AFC Asian Cup qualification	Qatar	3–0	Bangladesh

11 October 2006 2007 AFC Asian Cup qualification	Qatar	2–0	Hong Kong

15 November 2006 2007 AFC Asian Cup qualification	Uzbekistan	2–0	Qatar

=== 2007 ===
13 January 2007 Friendly	Qatar	1–1	Oman

18 January 2007 18th Arabian Gulf Cup	Qatar	0–1	Iraq

21 January 2007 18th Arabian Gulf Cup	Saudi Arabia	1–1	Qatar

24 January 2007 18th Arabian Gulf Cup	Qatar	1–2	Bahrain

24 March 2007 Friendly	Qatar	0–1	Iran

25 June 2007 Friendly	Qatar	1–0	Turkmenistan

2 July 2007 Friendly	Thailand	2–0	Qatar

9 July 2007 2007 AFC Asian Cup	Japan	1–1	Qatar

12 July 2007 2007 AFC Asian Cup	Vietnam	1–1	Qatar

16 July 2007 2007 AFC Asian Cup	Qatar	1–2	United Arab Emirates

17 September 2007 Friendly	Qatar	1–1	Oman

16 October 2007 Friendly	Qatar	3–2	Iraq

21 October 2007 2010 FIFA World Cup qualification	Sri Lanka	0–1	Qatar

28 October 2007 2010 FIFA World Cup qualification	Qatar	5–0 (6–0 agg.)	Sri Lanka

16 November 2007 Friendly	Qatar	1–2	Georgia

21 November 2007 Friendly	Qatar	1–6	Ivory Coast

=== 2008 ===
10 January 2008 Friendly	Qatar	0–0	Iran

13 January 2008 Friendly	Syria	0–0	Qatar

6 February 2008 2010 FIFA World Cup qualification	Australia	3–0	Qatar

4 March 2008 Friendly	Qatar	1–2	Bahrain

16 March 2008 Friendly	Qatar	2–1	Jordan

26 March 2008 2010 FIFA World Cup qualification	Qatar	2–0	Iraq

23 May 2008 Friendly	Qatar	1–1	Kuwait

27 May 2008 Friendly	Qatar	2–1	Lebanon

2 June 2008 2010 FIFA World Cup qualification	Qatar	0–0	China

7 June 2008 2010 FIFA World Cup qualification	China	0–1	Qatar

14 June 2008 2010 FIFA World Cup qualification	Qatar	1–3	Australia

22 June 2008 2010 FIFA World Cup qualification	Iraq	0–1	Qatar

9 August 2008 2008 WAFF Championship	Palestine	0–1	Qatar

11 August 2008 2008 WAFF Championship	Iran	6–1	Qatar

13 August 2008 2008 WAFF Championship	Jordan	3–0	Qatar

20 August 2008 Friendly	Qatar	5–0	Tajikistan

24 August 2008 Friendly	Qatar	2–1	North Korea

30 August 2008 Friendly	Saudi Arabia	2–1	Qatar

6 September 2008 2010 FIFA World Cup qualification	Qatar	3–0	Uzbekistan	Al Rayyan, Qatar
	Siddiq 37'; Mohamed 73'; Al-Bloushi 86'			Stadium: Jassim bin Hamad Stadium; Attendance: 8,000; Referee: Subkhiddin Mohd Salleh (Malaysia)

10 September 2008 2010 FIFA World Cup qualification	Qatar	1–1	Bahrain	Al Rayyan, Qatar
	Soria 6'		Fatadi 67'	Stadium: Jassim bin Hamad Stadium; Attendance: 7,000; Referee: Kim Dong-jin (South Korea)

15 October 2008 2010 FIFA World Cup qualification	Australia	4–0	Qatar	Brisbane, Australia
	Cahill 8'; Emerton 17' (pen.), 58'; Kennedy 76'			Stadium: Suncorp Stadium; Attendance: 34,320; Referee: Khalil Al Ghamdi (Saudi Arabia)

9 November 2008 Friendly	Qatar	0–1	Iran

14 November 2008 Friendly	Qatar	1–1	South Korea

19 November 2008 2010 FIFA World Cup qualification	Qatar	0–3	Japan	Al Rayyan, Qatar
			Tanaka 19'; Tamada 47'; Tulio 68'	Stadium: Jassim bin Hamad Stadium; Attendance: 13,000; Referee: Sun Baojie (China PR)

=== 2009 ===
5 January 2009 19th Arabian Gulf Cup	Saudi Arabia	0–0	Qatar

8 January 2009 19th Arabian Gulf Cup	Qatar	0–0	United Arab Emirates

11 January 2009 19th Arabian Gulf Cup	Qatar	2–1	Yemen

14 January 2009 19th Arabian Gulf Cup	Oman	1–0	Qatar

17 March 2009 Friendly	Qatar	1–0	Kuwait

21 March 2009 Friendly	Syria	1–2	Qatar

28 March 2009 2010 FIFA World Cup qualification	Uzbekistan	4–0	Qatar

1 April 2009 2010 FIFA World Cup qualification	Bahrain	1–0	Qatar

26 May 2009 Friendly	Qatar	2–1	Saudi Arabia

6 June 2009 2010 FIFA World Cup qualification	Qatar	0–0	Australia

10 June 2009 2010 FIFA World Cup qualification	Japan	0–0	Qatar

9 September 2009 Friendly	Qatar	1–1	Oman

8 October 2009 Friendly	Croatia	3–2	Qatar

11 October 2009 Friendly	Macedonia	2–1	Qatar

14 October 2009 Friendly	Qatar	2–2	DR Congo

13 November 2009 Friendly	Paraguay	0–2	Qatar

17 November 2009 Friendly	Belgium	2–0	Qatar

28 December 2009 Friendly	Qatar	3–2	Iran

30 December 2009 Friendly	Qatar	0–1	North Korea

== 2010–19 ==
=== 2010 ===
2 January 2010 Friendly	Qatar	0–0	Mali

3 March 2010 Friendly	Slovenia	4–1	Qatar

10 August 2010 Friendly	Bosnia and Herzegovina	1–1	Qatar

3 September 2010 Friendly	Qatar	1–1	Bahrain

7 September 2010 Friendly	Qatar	1–1	Oman

12 October 2010 Friendly	Qatar	1–2	Iraq

18 November 2010 Friendly	Qatar	0–1	Haiti

22 November 2010 20th Arabian Gulf Cup	Kuwait	1–0	Qatar

25 November 2010 20th Arabian Gulf Cup	Yemen	1–2	Qatar

28 November 2010 20th Arabian Gulf Cup	Qatar	1–1	Saudi Arabia

16 December 2010 Friendly	Qatar	2–1	Egypt

22 December 2010 Friendly	Qatar	2–0	Estonia

28 December 2010 Friendly	Qatar	0–0	Iran

31 December 2010 Friendly	Qatar	0–1	North Korea

=== 2011 ===
9 January 2011 2011 AFC Asian Cup	Qatar	0–2	Uzbekistan

12 January 2011 2011 AFC Asian Cup	Qatar	2–0	China

16 January 2011 2011 AFC Asian Cup	Qatar	3–0	Kuwait

21 January 2011 2011 AFC Asian Cup	Qatar	2–3	Japan

29 March 2011 Friendly	Qatar	1–1	Russia

17 July 2011 Friendly	Qatar	1–2	India	Al Rayyan, Qatar
17:00	Ibrahim 74'		Chhetri 16' (pen.); Singh 73'	Stadium: Jassim bin Hamad Stadium; Attendance: 3,000

23 July 2011 2014 FIFA World Cup qualification	Qatar	3–0	Vietnam

28 July 2011 2014 FIFA World Cup qualification	Vietnam	2–1 (2–4 agg.)	Qatar

19 August 2011 Friendly	Qatar	0–1	Iraq

25 August 2011 Friendly	United Arab Emirates	3–1	Qatar

2 September 2011 2014 FIFA World Cup qualification	Bahrain	0–0	Qatar

6 September 2011 2014 FIFA World Cup qualification	Qatar	1–1	Iran

11 October 2011 2014 FIFA World Cup qualification	Indonesia	2–3	Qatar

11 November 2011 2014 FIFA World Cup qualification	Qatar	4–0	Indonesia

15 November 2011 2014 FIFA World Cup qualification	Qatar	0–0	Bahrain

4 November 2011 Friendly	Qatar	0–0	Oman

10 December 2011 Friendly	Qatar	2–2	Bahrain

16 December 2011 Friendly	Qatar	0–0	Iraq

=== 2012 ===
29 February 2012 2014 FIFA World Cup qualification	Iran	2–2	Qatar

22 May 2012 Friendly	Albania	2–1	Qatar

28 May 2012 Friendly	Qatar	0–0	Palestine

3 June 2012 2014 FIFA World Cup qualification	Lebanon	0–1	Qatar

8 June 2012 2014 FIFA World Cup qualification	Qatar	1–4	South Korea

12 June 2012 2014 FIFA World Cup qualification	Iran	0–0	Qatar

6 September 2012 Friendly	Qatar	1–2	Tajikistan

8 October 2012 Friendly	Qatar	1–1	Jordan

16 October 2012 2014 FIFA World Cup qualification	Qatar	0–1	Uzbekistan

14 November 2012 2014 FIFA World Cup qualification	Qatar	1–0	Lebanon

=== 2013 ===
5 January 2013 21st Arabian Gulf Cup	Qatar	1–3	United Arab Emirates

8 January 2013 21st Arabian Gulf Cup	Qatar	2–1	Oman

11 January 2013 21st Arabian Gulf Cup	Bahrain	1–0	Qatar

31 January 2013 Friendly	Qatar	1–0	Lebanon

6 February 2013 2015 AFC Asian Cup qualification	Qatar	2–0	Malaysia

7 March 2013 Friendly	Qatar	3–1	Egypt

22 March 2013 2015 AFC Asian Cup qualification	Bahrain	1–0	Qatar

26 March 2013 2014 FIFA World Cup qualification	South Korea	2–1	Qatar

17 April 2013 Friendly	Qatar	2–0	Palestine

24 May 2013 Friendly	Qatar	3–1	Latvia

29 May 2013 Friendly	Qatar	1–1	Azerbaijan

4 June 2013 2014 FIFA World Cup qualification	Qatar	0–1	Iran

11 June 2013 Friendly	Qatar	0–0	North Korea

18 June 2013 2014 FIFA World Cup qualification	Uzbekistan	5–1	Qatar

5 September 2013 Friendly	Qatar	3–0	Mauritius

9 September 2013 Friendly	Qatar	1–1	Lebanon

9 October 2013 Friendly	Qatar	1–2	Vietnam

13 October 2013 2015 AFC Asian Cup qualification	Qatar	6–0	Yemen

15 November 2013 2015 AFC Asian Cup qualification	Yemen	1–4	Qatar

19 November 2013 2015 AFC Asian Cup qualification	Malaysia	0–1	Qatar

21 December 2013 Friendly	Qatar	1–1	Bahrain

25 December 2013 2014 WAFF Championship	Qatar	1–0	Palestine

=== 2014 ===
4 January 2014 2014 WAFF Championship	Qatar	3–0 (a.e.t.)	Kuwait

7 January 2014 2014 WAFF Championship	Qatar	2–0	Jordan

5 March 2014 2015 AFC Asian Cup qualification	Qatar	0–0	Bahrain

14 July 2014 Friendly	Qatar	2–2	Indonesia

3 September 2014 Friendly	Morocco	0–0	Qatar

9 September 2014 Friendly	Qatar	0–2	Peru

6 October 2014 Friendly	Qatar	3–0	Uzbekistan

9 October 2014 Friendly	Qatar	5–0	Lebanon

14 October 2014 Friendly	Qatar	1–0	Australia

6 November 2014 Friendly	Qatar	3–1	North Korea

13 November 2014 Friendly	Saudi Arabia	1–1	Qatar

16 November 2014 Friendly	Yemen	0–0	Qatar

19 November 2014 Friendly	Bahrain	0–0	Qatar

23 November 2014 Friendly	Oman	1–3	Qatar

26 November 2014 Friendly	Saudi Arabia	1–2	Qatar

27 December 2014 Friendly	Qatar	3–0	Estonia

=== 2015 ===
11 January 2015 2015 AFC Asian Cup	United Arab Emirates	4–1	Qatar

15 January 2015 2015 AFC Asian Cup	Qatar	0–1	Iran

19 January 2015 2015 AFC Asian Cup	Qatar	1–2	Bahrain

26 March 2015 Friendly	Qatar	1–0	Algeria

31 May 2015 International Friendly	Northern Ireland	1–1	Qatar	Crewe, England
17:00 BST	Dallas 70'	Report	Boudiaf 46'	Stadium: Gresty Road; Attendance: 3,022; Referee: Michael Oliver (England)

5 June 2015 Friendly	Scotland	1–0	Qatar

11 June 2015 2018 FIFA World Cup qualification	Maldives	0–1	Qatar

28 August 2015 Friendly	Qatar	4–0	Singapore

3 September 2015 2018 FIFA World Cup qualification	Qatar	15–0	Bhutan

8 September 2015 2018 FIFA World Cup qualification	Hong Kong	2–3	Qatar

8 October 2015 2018 FIFA World Cup qualification	Qatar	1–0	China

13 October 2015 2018 FIFA World Cup qualification	Qatar	4–0	Maldives

13 November 2015 Friendly	Qatar	1–2	Turkey

17 November 2015 2018 FIFA World Cup qualification	Bhutan	0–3	Qatar

=== 2016 ===
24 March 2016 2018 FIFA World Cup qualification	Qatar	2–0	Hong Kong

29 March 2016 2018 FIFA World Cup qualification	China	2–0	Qatar

29 May 2016 Friendly	Albania	3–1	Qatar

8 August 2016 Friendly	Qatar	2–1	Iraq

25 August 2016 Friendly	Qatar	3–0	Thailand

1 September 2016 2018 FIFA World Cup qualification	Iran	2–0	Qatar

6 September 2016 2018 FIFA World Cup qualification	Qatar	0–1	Uzbekistan

29 September 2016 Friendly	Qatar	3–0	Serbia

6 October 2016 2018 FIFA World Cup qualification	South Korea	3–2	Qatar

11 October 2016 2018 FIFA World Cup qualification	Qatar	1–0	Syria

10 November 2016 Friendly	Qatar	2–1	Russia

15 November 2016 2018 FIFA World Cup qualification	China	0–0	Qatar

=== 2017 ===
17 January 2017 Friendly	Qatar	1–1	Moldova

9 March 2017 Friendly	Qatar	1–2	Azerbaijan

23 March 2017 2018 FIFA World Cup qualification	Qatar	0–1	Iran	Al Rayyan, Qatar
19:00 UTC+3			Taremi 52'	Stadium: Jassim bin Hamad Stadium; Attendance: 10,237; Referee: Liu Kwok Man (Hong Kong)

28 March 2017 2018 FIFA World Cup qualification	Uzbekistan	1–0	Qatar	Tashkent, Uzbekistan
18:00 UTC+5	Ahmedov 65'			Stadium: Bunyodkor Stadium; Attendance: 19,000; Referee: Mohanad Qasim Eesee Sarray (Iraq)

6 June 2017 Friendly	Qatar	2–2	North Korea

13 June 2017 2018 FIFA World Cup qualification	Qatar	3–2	South Korea	Al Rayyan, Qatar
22:00 UTC+3	Al-Haydos 25', 75'; Ak. Afif 51'		Ki Sung-yueng 62'; Hwang Hee-chan 70'	Stadium: Jassim bin Hamad Stadium; Attendance: 5,373; Referee: Hettikamkanamge Perera (Sri Lanka)

16 August 2017 Friendly	Andorra	0–1	Qatar

23 August 2017 Friendly	Qatar	2–1	Turkmenistan

31 August 2017 2018 FIFA World Cup qualification	Syria	3–1	Qatar	Krubong, Malaysia
20:00 UTC+8	Kharbin 7', 54'; Al-Mawas 90+5'		Assadalla 35'	Stadium: Hang Jebat Stadium; Attendance: 300; Referee: Ali Sabah (Iraq)

5 September 2017 2018 FIFA World Cup qualification	Qatar	1–2	China	Al Rayyan, Qatar
18:00 UTC+3	Ak. Afif 47'		Xiao Zhi 74'; Wu Lei 84'	Stadium: Khalifa International Stadium; Attendance: 5,686; Referee: Ahmed Al-Kaf (Oman)

5 October 2017 Friendly	Qatar	3–1	Singapore

10 October 2017 Friendly	Qatar	1–2	Curaçao

11 November 2017 Friendly	Qatar	0–1	Czech Republic

14 November 2017 Friendly	Qatar	1–1	Iceland

14 December 2017 Friendly	Qatar	1–2	Liechtenstein

23 December 2017 23rd Arabian Gulf Cup	Qatar	4–0	Yemen	Kuwait City, Kuwait
	Ak. Afif 2'; Al-Mahdi 5'; Almoez Ali 18'; Ró-Ró 84'			Stadium: Al Kuwait Sports Club Stadium; Referee: Omar Al-Yaqoubi (Oman)

26 December 2017 23rd Arabian Gulf Cup	Iraq	2–1	Qatar	Kuwait City, Kuwait
	Faez 45+1'; Husni 65'		Almoez Ali 17'	Stadium: Al Kuwait Sports Club Stadium; Referee: Ali Shaban (Kuwait)

29 December 2017 23rd Arabian Gulf Cup	Qatar	1–1	Bahrain	Kuwait City, Kuwait
	Al-Haydos 45+5' (pen.)		Madan 57'	Stadium: Jaber International Stadium; Referee: Aziz Asimov (Uzbekistan)

=== 2018 ===
21 March 2018 Friendly	Iraq	2–3	Qatar	Basra, Iraq
19:00 UTC+3	Yasin 31'; Al-Saedi 67'	Report	Ak. Afif 17', 45+1'; Mohammad 63'	Stadium: Basra Sports City; Attendance: 65,000; Referee: Taher Bakar (Syria)

24 March 2018 Friendly	Qatar	2–2	Syria	Basra, Iraq
19:00 UTC+3	Hatem 58'; Ak. Afif 72'	Report	Al Soma 49'; Midani 74'	Stadium: Basra Sports City; Attendance: 18,781; Referee: Wathik Mohammed Abdallah Al-Baag (Iraq)

7 September 2018 Friendly	Qatar	1–0	China	Al Rayyan, Qatar
19:00 UTC+3	Ali 25'	Report		Stadium: Khalifa International Stadium; Attendance: 1,200; Referee: Ali Shaban (Kuwait)

11 September 2018 Friendly	Qatar	3–0	Palestine	Al Rayyan, Qatar
19:00 UTC+3	Ali 3'; Ak. Afif 19'; Al-Haydos 29'	Report		Stadium: Khalifa International Stadium; Attendance: 1,766; Referee: Omar Al-Yaqoubi (Oman)

12 October 2018 Friendly	Qatar	4–3	Ecuador	Al Rayyan, Qatar
18:30 UTC+3	Ak. Afif 32'; Ali 36', 68'; Al-Haydos 61' (pen.)	Report	E. Valencia 66', 71'; Cevallos 89'	Stadium: Jassim bin Hamad Stadium; Attendance: 11,480; Referee: Adham Makhadmeh (Jordan)

16 October 2018 Friendly	Uzbekistan	2–0	Qatar	Tashkent, Uzbekistan
19:00 UTC+5	Ahmedov 73'; Bikmaev 86'	Report		Stadium: Milliy Stadium; Attendance: 12,155; Referee: Çarymyrat Kurbanow (Turkmenistan)

14 November 2018 Friendly	Switzerland	0–1	Qatar	Lugano, Switzerland
19:00 UTC+1		Report	Ak. Afif 86'	Stadium: Cornaredo Stadium; Attendance: 4,170; Referee: Kevin Blom (Netherlands)

19 November 2018 Friendly	Qatar	2–2	Iceland	Eupen, Belgium
19:30 UTC+1	Al-Haydos 3'; Khoukhi 68'	Report	Al Sheeb 29' (o.g.); Sigþórsson 56' (pen.)	Stadium: Kehrwegstadion; Attendance: 2,830; Referee: Pol van Boekel (Netherlands)

23 December 2018 Friendly	Qatar	2–0	Jordan	Al Rayyan, Qatar
20:00 UTC+3	Ali 31'; Alaaeldin 90'	Report		Stadium: Khalifa International Stadium

25 December 2018 Friendly	Qatar	1–0	Kyrgyzstan	Al Rayyan, Qatar
20:00 UTC+3	Al. Afif 69'	Report		Stadium: Khalifa International Stadium

27 December 2018 Friendly	Qatar	0–1	Algeria	Al Rayyan, Qatar
15:00 UTC+3		Report	Bounedjah 55'	Stadium: Khalifa International Stadium

31 December 2018 Friendly	Qatar	1–2	Iran	Al Rayyan, Qatar
20:00 UTC+3	Al-Haydos 43' (pen.)	Report	Taremi 17'; Azmoun 46'	Stadium: Khalifa International Stadium; Attendance: 0 Referee: Qasim Al-Hatmi (Oman)

=== 2019 ===
9 January 2019 2019 Asian Cup	Qatar	2–0	Lebanon	Al Ain, United Arab Emirates
20:00 UTC+4	Al-Rawi 65'; Ali 79'	Report		Stadium: Hazza bin Zayed Stadium; Attendance: 7,847; Referee: Ma Ning (China)

13 January 2019 2019 Asian Cup	North Korea	0–6	Qatar	Al Ain, United Arab Emirates
15:00 UTC+4		Report	Ali 9', 11', 55', 60'; Khoukhi 43'; Hassan 68'	Stadium: Khalifa bin Zayed Stadium; Attendance: 452; Referee: Hettikamkanamge Perera (Sri Lanka)

17 January 2019 2019 Asian Cup	Saudi Arabia	0–2	Qatar	Abu Dhabi, United Arab Emirates
20:00 UTC+4		Report	Ali 45+1', 80'	Stadium: Zayed Sports City Stadium; Attendance: 16,067; Referee: Kim Dong-jin (South Korea)

22 January 2019 2019 Asian Cup	Qatar	1–0	Iraq	Abu Dhabi, United Arab Emirates
20:00 UTC+4	Al-Rawi 62'	Report		Stadium: Al Nahyan Stadium; Attendance: 14,701; Referee: Muhammad Taqi (Singapore)

25 January 2019 2019 Asian Cup	South Korea	0–1	Qatar	Abu Dhabi, United Arab Emirates
17:00 UTC+4		Report	Hatem 78'	Stadium: Zayed Sports City Stadium; Attendance: 13,791; Referee: Ravshan Irmatov (Uzbekistan)

29 January 2019 2019 Asian Cup	Qatar	4–0	United Arab Emirates	Abu Dhabi, United Arab Emirates
18:00 UTC+4	Khoukhi 22'; Ali 37'; Al-Haydos 80'; Ismail 90+4'	Report		Stadium: Mohammed bin Zayed Stadium; Attendance: 38,646; Referee: César Arturo Ramos (Mexico)

1 February 2019 2019 Asian Cup	Japan	1–3	Qatar	Abu Dhabi, United Arab Emirates
18:00 UTC+4	Minamino 69'	Report	Ali 12'; Hatem 27'; Ak. Afif 83' (pen.)	Stadium: Zayed Sports City Stadium; Attendance: 36,776; Referee: Ravshan Irmatov (Uzbekistan)

5 June 2019 Friendly	Brazil	2–0	Qatar	Brasília, Brazil
20:30 UTC−3	Richarlison 16'; Gabriel Jesus 24'	Report		Stadium: Estádio Nacional Mané Garrincha; Referee: José Argote (Venezuela)

16 June 2019 2019 Copa América	Paraguay	2–2	Qatar	Rio de Janeiro, Brazil
16:00 UTC−3	Cardozo 4' (pen.); González 56'	Report	Ali 68'; Khoukhi 77'	Stadium: Estádio do Maracanã; Referee: Diego Haro (Peru)

19 June 2019 2019 Copa América	Colombia	1–0	Qatar	São Paulo, Brazil
18:30 UTC−3	D. Zapata 85'	Report		Stadium: Estádio do Morumbi; Referee: Alexis Herrera (Venezuela)

23 June 2019 2019 Copa América	Qatar	0–2	Argentina	Porto Alegre, Brazil
16:00 UTC−3		Report	Martínez 4'; Agüero 82'	Stadium: Arena do Grêmio; Referee: Julio Bascuñán (Chile)

5 September 2019 2022 FWCQ R2	Qatar	6–0	Afghanistan	Al Rayyan, Qatar
19:30 UTC+3	Ali 4', 10', 51'; Al-Haydos 13'; Hassan 34'; Khoukhi 67'	Report (FIFA); Report (AFC)		Stadium: Jassim bin Hamad Stadium; Referee: Aziz Asimov (Uzbekistan)

10 September 2019 2022 FWCQ R2	Qatar	0–0	India	Al Rayyan, Qatar
19:30 UTC+3		Report (FIFA); Report (AFC)		Stadium: Jassim bin Hamad Stadium; Attendance: 12,020; Referee: Nazmi Nasaruddin (Malaysia)

10 October 2019 2022 FWCQ R2	Bangladesh	0–2	Qatar	Dhaka, Bangladesh
19:00 UTC+6		Report (FIFA); Report (AFC)	Abdurisag 28'; Boudiaf 90+2'	Stadium: Bangabandhu National Stadium; Referee: Bijan Heidari (Iran)

15 October 2019 2022 FWCQ R2	Qatar	2–1	Oman	Al Rayyan, Qatar
19:30 UTC+3	Afif 2'; Alm. Ali 71'	Report (FIFA); Report (AFC)	R. Al-Alawi 63'	Stadium: Jassim bin Hamad Stadium; Attendance: 26,731; Referee: Fu Ming (China)

14 November 2019 Friendly	Qatar	2–0	Singapore	Doha, Qatar
20:30 UTC+3	Muntari 31'; Shahdan 43' (o.g.)	Report		Stadium: Abdullah bin Khalifa Stadium

19 November 2019 2022 FWCQ R2	Afghanistan	0–1	Qatar	Dushanbe, Tajikistan
19:00 UTC+5		Report (FIFA); Report (AFC)	Afif 76' (pen.)	Stadium: Central Republican Stadium; Referee: Timur Faizullin (Kyrgyzstan)

26 November 2019 Arabian Gulf Cup	Qatar	1–2	Iraq	Al Rayyan, Qatar
19:30 UTC+3	Hatem 49'	Report	Qasim 19', 27'	Stadium: Khalifa International Stadium; Referee: Lionel Tschudi (Switzerland)

29 November 2019 Arabian Gulf Cup	Yemen	0–6	Qatar	Doha, Qatar
20:00 UTC+3		Report	Hassan 29', 36', 72' (pen.); Ali 57'; Al-Ahrak 85'; Afif 90'	Stadium: Abdullah bin Khalifa Stadium; Referee: Ali Shaban (Kuwait)

2 December 2019 Arabian Gulf Cup	Qatar	4–2	United Arab Emirates	Al Rayyan, Qatar
17:30 UTC+3	Afif 20', 28' (pen.); Al-Haydos 53'; Khoukhi 90+5'	Report	Mabkhout 33' (pen.), 77'	Stadium: Khalifa International Stadium; Referee: Ryuji Sato (Japan)

5 December 2019 Arabian Gulf Cup	Saudi Arabia	1–0	Qatar	Al Wakrah, Qatar
20:00 UTC+3	Al-Hamdan 28'	Report		Stadium: Al Janoub Stadium; Attendance: 42,025; Referee: Ahmad Al-Ali (Kuwait)

== Head-to-head records ==
Qatar national football team head-to-head records (2000–2019)
Opponent	Pld	W	D	L	GF	GA	GD	Pts	Confederation
Afghanistan	2	2	0	0	7	0	+7	6	AFC
Albania	1	0	0	1	1	2	–1	0	UEFA
Algeria	3	1	0	2	1	2	–1	3	CAF
Andorra	1	1	0	0	1	0	+1	3	UEFA
Argentina	1	0	0	1	0	2	–2	0	CONMEBOL
Australia	4	1	1	2	2	7	–5	4	AFC
Azerbaijan	2	0	1	1	2	3	–1	1	UEFA
Bahrain	8	1	5	2	6	6	0	8	AFC
Bangladesh	3	3	0	0	9	1	+8	9	AFC
Belgium	1	0	0	1	0	2	–2	0	UEFA
Bhutan	2	2	0	0	18	0	+18	6	AFC
Bosnia and Herzegovina	2	1	1	0	3	1	+2	4	UEFA
Brazil	1	0	0	1	0	2	–2	0	CONMEBOL
China	8	4	2	2	8	6	+2	14	AFC
Colombia	1	0	0	1	0	1	–1	0	CONMEBOL
Croatia	1	0	0	1	2	3	–1	0	UEFA
Curaçao	1	0	0	1	1	2	–1	0	CONCACAF
Czech Republic	1	0	0	1	0	1	–1	0	UEFA
DR Congo	1	0	1	0	2	2	0	1	CAF
Ecuador	1	1	0	0	4	3	+1	3	CONMEBOL
Egypt	4	2	0	2	6	12	–6	6	CAF
Estonia	2	2	0	0	5	0	+5	6	UEFA
Georgia	1	0	0	1	1	2	–1	0	UEFA
Haiti	1	0	0	1	0	1	–1	0	CONCACAF
Hong Kong	5	4	0	1	10	2	+8	12	AFC
Iceland	1	0	1	0	2	2	0	1	UEFA
India	2	0	1	1	1	2	–1	1	AFC
Indonesia	3	2	1	0	9	4	+5	7	AFC
Iran	9	0	4	5	4	10	–6	4	AFC
Iraq	11	5	2	4	13	10	+3	17	AFC
Ivory Coast	1	0	0	1	1	6	–5	0	CAF
Japan	7	1	4	2	7	10	–3	7	AFC
Jordan	6	3	2	1	9	6	+3	11	AFC
Kazakhstan	1	1	0	0	3	1	+2	3	UEFA
Kuwait	9	5	2	2	13	6	+7	17	AFC
Kyrgyzstan	2	1	1	0	1	0	+1	4	AFC
Laos	1	1	0	0	5	0	+5	3	AFC
Lebanon	5	4	1	0	7	1	+6	13	AFC
Libya	2	1	0	1	4	1	+3	3	CAF
North Macedonia	2	1	0	1	2	2	0	3	UEFA
Malaysia	4	3	1	0	8	1	+7	10	AFC
Mali	1	0	1	0	0	0	0	1	CAF
Malta	1	0	0	1	0	2	–2	0	UEFA
Mauritius	1	1	0	0	3	0	+3	3	CAF
North Korea	7	3	2	2	12	5	+7	11	AFC
Northern Ireland	1	0	1	0	1	1	0	1	UEFA
Oman	9	3	4	2	11	8	+3	13	AFC
Pakistan	1	1	0	0	5	0	+5	3	AFC
Palestine	5	4	1	0	8	2	+6	13	AFC
Paraguay	2	1	1	0	4	2	+2	4	CONMEBOL
Peru	1	0	0	1	0	2	–2	0	CONMEBOL
Russia	2	1	1	0	3	2	+1	4	UEFA
Saudi Arabia	10	3	4	3	7	8	–1	13	AFC
Scotland	1	0	0	1	0	1	–1	0	UEFA
Singapore	4	4	0	0	12	2	+10	12	AFC
Slovenia	1	0	0	1	1	4	–3	0	UEFA
South Korea	6	2	1	3	7	9	–2	7	AFC
Sri Lanka	2	2	0	0	6	0	+6	6	AFC
Sudan	1	1	0	0	3	0	+3	3	CAF
Switzerland	1	1	0	0	1	0	+1	3	UEFA
Syria	5	2	2	1	6	6	0	8	AFC
Tajikistan	2	1	0	1	6	2	+4	3	AFC
Thailand	5	2	1	2	7	6	+1	7	AFC
Turkmenistan	2	2	0	0	3	1	+2	6	AFC
United Arab Emirates	5	3	1	1	11	7	+4	10	AFC
Uzbekistan	7	2	1	4	8	11	–3	7	AFC
Vietnam	2	1	0	1	4	2	+2	3	AFC
Wales	1	0	0	1	0	1	–1	0	UEFA
Yemen	5	4	1	0	16	1	+15	13	AFC
Zimbabwe	1	0	0	1	0	2	–2	0	CAF
Total	206	88	53	65	305	220	+85	317	
