= Abeer Issa =

Jordanian actress (born 1961)

- Born: Abeer Issa Yousef Hiqari; 25 April 1961 (age 64); Amman, Jordan
- Occupation: actress

Abeer Issa (Arabic: عبير عيسى) (born 25 April 1961) is a Jordanian actress.

== Life ==
Abeer Issa was born Abeer Issa Yousef Hiqari on 25 April 1961, in the city of Amman. Her father was Jordanian, and her mother was Palestinian. Her career began in 1977 in television series like "Haret Abo Awwad" and "Qarya Bela Soqouf". She is best known for her Bedouin soap operas and work in several films. She has also acted in a number of soap operas in Egypt.

== Selected work ==
- "Awraq Al-Hob" (2012)
- "Tawaam Rouhi" (2012)
- "Hebr Al-Oyoun" (2012)
- "Tom Al-Ghourra" (2012)
- "Bawabet Al-Qouds" (2011)
- "Saheel Al-Asayiel" (2010)
- "Waraq Al-Wared" (2009)
- Bwabet Al-Janna (2009)
- "Nimer Bin Edwan" (2007)
- "Al-Hour Al-Eain" (2005)
- Al-Raghba Fi Al-Soqout (2005)
- "Baqaya Ramad" (2002)
- "Al-Manahel" (1988)
