= 2014 WAFF Women's Championship =

5th edition of the WAFF Women's Championship

5th WAFF Championship for Women

Tournament details
- Host country: Jordan
- Dates: 15–19 April
- Teams: 4 (from 1 sub-confederation)
- Venue: 1 (in 1 host city)

Final positions
- Champions: Jordan (3rd title)
- Runners-up: Palestine
- Third place: Bahrain
- Fourth place: Qatar

Tournament statistics
- Matches played: 6
- Goals scored: 40 (6.67 per match)
- Attendance: 3,250 (542 per match)
- Top scorer: (Jordan) Abeer Al-Nahar (4 goals)

The 2014 WAFF Women's Championship tournament was held from 15 to 19 April 2014 in Amman, Jordan. It was the fifth edition of the West Asian Football Federation Women's Championship.

The tournament was won by Jordan, who won all of their games.

== Teams and format ==
Four teams entered the tournament. A single round robin was played. Group was announced on 27 March 2014.

Round Robin

Jordan
Palestine
Qatar
Bahrain

== Group stage ==
Team	Pld	W	D	L	GF	GA	GD	Pts
Jordan	3	3	0	0	22	0	+22	9
Palestine	3	2	0	1	8	10	−2	6
Bahrain	3	1	0	2	8	11	−3	3
Qatar	3	0	0	3	2	19	−17	0

15 April 2014
16:00

Jordan	5–0	Bahrain
Khraisat 59'; Al-Naber 65', 67'; Al-Masri 70'; Jbarah 75'	Report

Petra Stadium, Amman
Attendance: 700
Referee: Hussein Abo Yehia (Lebanon)
15 April 2014
20:00

Palestine	4–0	Qatar
Klodi 20', 47', 65'; Nasser 56'	Report

Petra Stadium, Amman
Attendance: 150
Referee: Ahmad Ibrahim (Jordan)

17 April 2014
16:00

Qatar	0–7	Jordan
	Report	Al-Nahar 9', 14', 38', 47' (pen.); Sweilem 40'; Al-Sufy 43'; Khalil 85'

Petra Stadium, Amman
Attendance: 800
Referee: Mohammad Ibdeir (Palestine)
17 April 2014
20:00

Bahrain	0–4	Palestine
	Report	Shaheen 25'; Abughazala 48'; Hussein 84', 90'

Petra Stadium, Amman
Attendance: 300
Referee: Abdulrahman Al-Jassim (Qatar)

19 April 2014
16:00

Jordan	10–0	Palestine
Al-Masri 6', 24'; Jebreen 11'; Al-Hyasat 34', 71'; Khraisat 39'; Jbarah 48', 52'; Al-Naber 76'; Majali 79'	Report

Petra Stadium, Amman
Attendance: 1,000
Referee: Abdulrahman Al-Jassim (Qatar)
19 April 2014
20:00

Qatar	2–8	Bahrain
Al-Naemi 51'; Al-Jassim 90+2'	Report	Fayez 31', 88'; Al-Hashmi 39'; Yaqoob 51', 61', 86'; Al-Anood 62'; Al-Majri 90'

Petra Stadium, Amman
Attendance: 300
Referee: Ahmad Ibrahim (Jordan)

== Winners ==
2014 WAFF Women's champions

Jordan
Third title

== Goalscorers ==
4 goals

- (Jordan) Abeer Al-Nahar

3 goals

- (Bahrain) Manar Yaqoob
- (Jordan) Luna Al-Masri
- (Jordan) Stephanie Al-Naber
- (Jordan) Maysa Jbarah
- (Palestine) Klodi Salama

2 goals

- (Bahrain) Yasmeen Fayez
- (Jordan) Sama'a Khraisat
- (Palestine) Walaa Hussein

1 goal

- (Bahrain) Shaika Al-Anood
- (Bahrain) Reem Al-Hashmi
- (Bahrain) Enshirah Al-Hyasat
- (Bahrain) Marwa Al-Majri
- (Jordan) Anfal Al-Sufy
- (Jordan) Shahnaz Jebreen
- (Jordan) Haya Khalil
- (Jordan) Ayah Majali
- (Jordan) Mai Sweilem
- (Palestine) Talin Abughazala
- (Palestine) Haneen Nasser
- (Palestine) Natali Shaheen
- (Qatar) Dana Al-Jassim
- (Qatar) Reem Al-Naemi
