= Abir Al-Tabbaa =

Engineer

Abir Al-Tabba
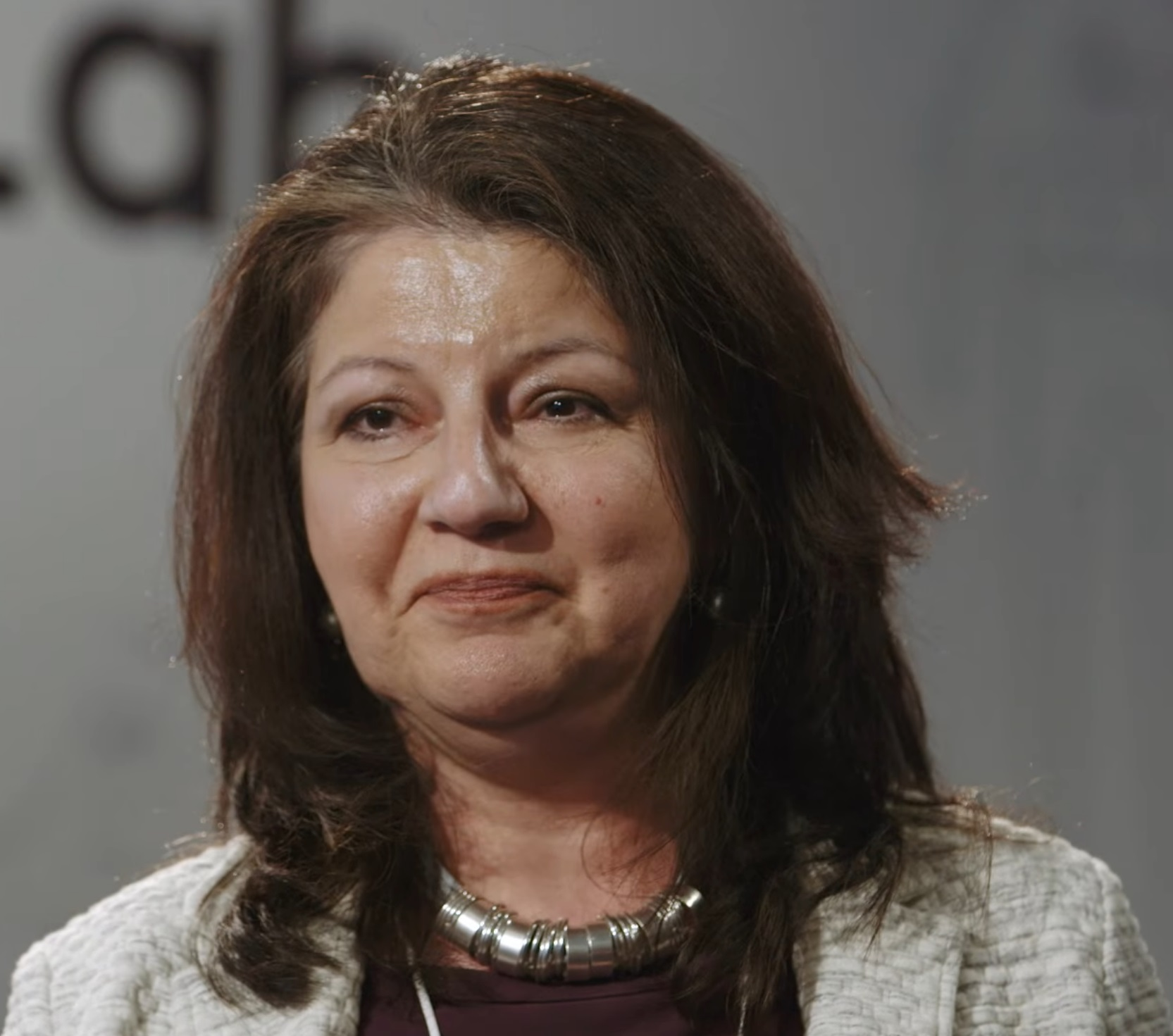
- Abir Al-Tabbaa speaks on self-healing concrete at the World Economic Forum in 2016
- Education: University of Cambridge; University of Bristol
- Scientific career
- Workplaces: University of Birmingham; University of Cambridge
- Thesis: Permeability and stress-strain response of speswhite kaolin (1987)

Abir Al-Tabbaa is a Professor of Civil and Environmental Engineering at the University of Cambridge. She works on intelligent materials for infrastructure. She is the Director of the Future Infrastructure and Built Environment Doctoral Training Centre.

== Early life and education ==
Al-Tabbaa studied at the University of Bristol. She completed her Master's and doctoral degrees at the University of Cambridge, working on the stress-strain responses of Kaolinite. Her Master's research considered the anisotropy of clay. She obtained her PhD in 1987 with a dissertation entitled Permeability and stress-strain response of speswhite kaolin. After graduating Al-Tabbaa worked at Ove Arup & Partners as a geotechnical engineer. She was involved with the construction of the Charing Cross railway station and Ludgate Hill railway station. In 1991 she joined the University of Birmingham as a lecturer.

== Research ==
Al-Tabbaa returned to the University of Cambridge in 1997 and was made a Fellow of Sidney Sussex College. Her work concentrates on the development and testing of materials for civil engineering. She is interested in low-carbon infrastructure and the remediation of contaminated land. She also works on soil mix technology and water valorisation. She has developed new techniques for the characterisation of soils. She has over 300 publications. In 2003 she was awarded the Institution of Civil Engineers' Mallik Medal for her work on the five-year soil treatment mixing work at West Drayton.

She was part of a £1.67 million Engineering and Physical Sciences Research Council project that established the Centre of Excellence on Intelligent Construction Materials to reduce the cost of infrastructure maintenance of future construction. The project was followed up with an EPSRC Programme Grant on resilient materials for life. Amongst other biomimetic materials, the collaboration developed self-healing concrete. She spoke about their work at the World Economic Forum in 2016.

=== Academic service ===
She has written for the New Civil Engineer. Al-Tabbaa has served on the British Geotechnical Association Executive Committee, the Institution of Civil Engineers' Geotechnical Advisory Panel and the Grounded Improvement Advisory Panel. In 2014 she became the Director of the Future Infrastructure and Built Environment Doctoral Training Centre. She serves on the editorial board of the American Society of Civil Engineers Journal of Materials in Civil Engineering. She is also the UK representative for the Self-healing as Preventative Repair of Concrete Structures (SARCOS) European Cooperation in Science and Technology Action. She was elected a Fellow of the Institution of Civil Engineers in 2014, recognising her significant contributions to both research and education in civil engineering. In 2016 she was part of a group of academics from the University of Cambridge who wrote to The Daily Telegraph to stress the need for European funding for scientific research. Al-Tabbaa appeared on the BBC Radio Cambridgeshire programme The Naked Scientists.

=== Books ===
- 2010 Rainfall Trends in India and Their Impact on Soil Erosion: Rainfall Trends in India and Their Impact on Soil Erosion
- 2005 Stabilisation/Solidification Treatment and Remediation
