= Abir Hossain Angkon =

Bangladeshi film actor

- আবির হোসেন অংকন
- Occupation: Film actor
- Years active: 2014–unknown
- Notable work: Baishamya
- Awards: National Film Award (1st time)

Abir Hossain Angkon is a Bangladeshi film actor. He won Bangladesh National Film Award for Best Child Artist for the film Baishamya (2014).

== Awards and nominations ==
Year	Award	Category	Film	Result
2014	National Film Award	Best Child Artist	Baishamya	Won
