= 2010 Arabia Women's Cup =

كأس الكرة القدم النسائية العربية

Tournament details
- Host country: Bahrain
- Dates: 18–28 October
- Teams: 8 (from 2 confederations)
- Venue: 2 (in 2 host cities)

Final positions
- Champions: Jordan (1st title)
- Runners-up: Egypt
- Third place: Bahrain
- Fourth place: Palestine

Tournament statistics
- Matches played: 16
- Goals scored: 130 (8.13 per match)

The 2010 Arabia Women's Cup (Arabic: كأس الكرة القدم النسائية العربية) took place in Bahrain in October 2010. The eight participating teams were Iraq, Jordan, Egypt, Lebanon, Palestine, Syria, Qatar and hosts Bahrain. The 2010 tournament was the first installation. The winner of the tournament, Jordan, will attend a training session hosted by the defending World Cup champion, Germany.

== Results ==
=== Group A ===
Team	Pld	W	D	L	GF	GA	GD	Pts
Bahrain	3	3	0	0	22	1	+21	9
Palestine	3	2	0	1	23	5	+18	6
Syria	3	1	0	2	16	8	+8	3
Qatar	3	0	0	3	0	47	−47	0

18 October 2010

Bahrain	17–0	Qatar

National Stadium, Riffa

18 October 2010

Palestine	5–3	Syria

20 October 2010

Qatar	0–18	Palestine
		Hussein; Odeh; Shaheen; Sahjian; Jarban; Moalem

Al Ahli Stadium, Mahooz, Manama

20 October 2010

Bahrain	3–1	Syria

Al Ahli Stadium, Mahooz, Manama

22 October 2010

Bahrain	2–0	Palestine

Al Ahli Stadium, Mahooz, Manama

22 October 2010

Syria	12–0	Qatar

=== Group B ===
Team	Pld	W	D	L	GF	GA	GD	Pts
Egypt	3	3	0	0	21	1	+20	9
Jordan	3	2	0	1	23	2	+21	6
Lebanon	3	1	0	2	11	8	+3	3
Iraq	3	0	0	3	0	44	−44	0

19 October 2010

Jordan	20–0	Iraq

Al Ahli Stadium, Mahooz, Manama

19 October 2010

Egypt	5–1	Lebanon
Ebrahim		Bakri

21 October 2010

Jordan	3–1	Lebanon
Jbarah; Al-Naber		Bakri

Al Ahli Stadium, Mahooz, Manama

21 October 2010

Egypt	15–0	Iraq

Al Ahli Stadium, Mahooz, Manama

23 October 2010

Egypt	1–0	Jordan

23 October 2010

Lebanon	9–0	Iraq
Bakri; El Jaafil; Ammouri; Yordanov; Haidar; (o.g.)

== Knockout stages ==
=== Knockout Map ===
Semi finals
25 October
Bahrain	0
Jordan	3
25 October
Egypt	4
Palestine	0

Final
27 October
Jordan	1
Egypt	0
Third place play-off
28 October
Bahrain	5
Palestine	1

=== Semi finals ===
25 October 2010

Bahrain	0–3	Jordan
		Ibrahim 11'; Emad 31'; Mazen 66'

National Stadium, Riffa

25 October 2010

Egypt	4–0	Palestine
Eid 1'; Fekry 13'; Hidar 30'; Mortada 90'

National Stadium, Riffa

=== Third place play-off ===
27 October 2010

Bahrain	5–1	Palestine
Al Hashmi 22' (pen.); Yaqoob 49', 59'; Al Majry 80'; Al Anood 84'		Shaheen 90' (pen.)

National Stadium, Riffa
Referee: Hoda El Awadi (Lebanon)

=== Final ===
28 October 2010

Jordan	1–0	Egypt
Mazen 81'

National Stadium, Riffa
Attendance: 1000

== Awards ==
2010 Arabia Women's Cup winners

Jordan

== Final ranking ==
Pos	Team	Pld	W	D	L	GF	GA	Dif	Pts
1	Jordan	5	4	0	1	27	2	+25	12
2	Egypt	5	4	0	1	25	2	+23	12
3	Bahrain	5	4	0	1	27	7	+20	12
4	Palestine	5	2	0	3	24	14	+10	6
5	Syria	3	1	0	2	16	8	+8	3
6	Lebanon	3	1	0	2	11	8	+3	3
7	Iraq	3	0	0	3	0	44	-44	0
8	Qatar	3	0	0	3	0	47	-47	0

== See also ==
- Arab Women's Championship
