= Abir Har Even =

Israeli chess player

Abir Har Even (Hebrew: אביר הר אבן; born 1947) is a chess player who holds the title of International Correspondence Chess Grandmaster and was the Israeli champion of correspondence chess for the 1966 and 1974 championships. He lives in Emmanuel, Israel.

Major tournaments that Har Even played in the past or is playing currently
Start date	Name of the tournament	Site	Board for a team event	Place in individual event	Number of games	Category	GM norm	Actual result
1996	Marcussi Memorial	-	-	3-4	17	12	10	11
1.05.1997	The Israeli Champion of champions		-	2	10	-	-	7
16.10.2004	European TC VI, Final		5	-	12	10	8	5.5
10.07.2005	16. Olympiad section 1		1	-	11	9	7	6

Har Even's ICCF rating is 2532 (updated 9.2007) and he holds the sixth place in Israel.
