= Qatar women's national football team =

Women's national association football team representing Qatar

Qatar
- Nickname: The Maroon Ladies (Arabic: سيدات العنابي)
- Association: Qatar Football Association (QFA)
- Confederation: AFC (Asia)
- Sub-confederation: WAFF (West Asia)
- Head coach: Fedha Al-Abdullah
- Captain: Suaad Al-Hashemi
- Home stadium: Jassim bin Hamad Stadium
- FIFA code: QAT
First colours	Second colours

FIFA ranking
- Current: NR (16 June 2026)
- Highest: 111 (December 2013)
- Lowest: 139 (September 2015)

First international
- Bahrain 17–0 Qatar (Manama, Bahrain; 18 October 2010)

Biggest win
- Qatar 4–1 Maldives (Doha, Qatar; 31 March 2012)

Biggest defeat
- Qatar 0–18 Palestine (Manama, Bahrain; 20 October 2010)

WAFF Championship
- Appearances: 1 (first in 2014)
- Best result: Group Stage (2014)

The Qatar women's national football team (Arabic: منتخب قطر لكرة القدم للسيدات) represented Qatar in international women's football, and was controlled by the Qatar Women’s Sport Committee (QWSC).

The team was created in 2009, as Qatar was preparing to bid for the 2022 FIFA World Cup, but has been inactive since 2014, and is currently unranked in the FIFA world ranking. It has played a total of 15 official fixtures.

== History ==
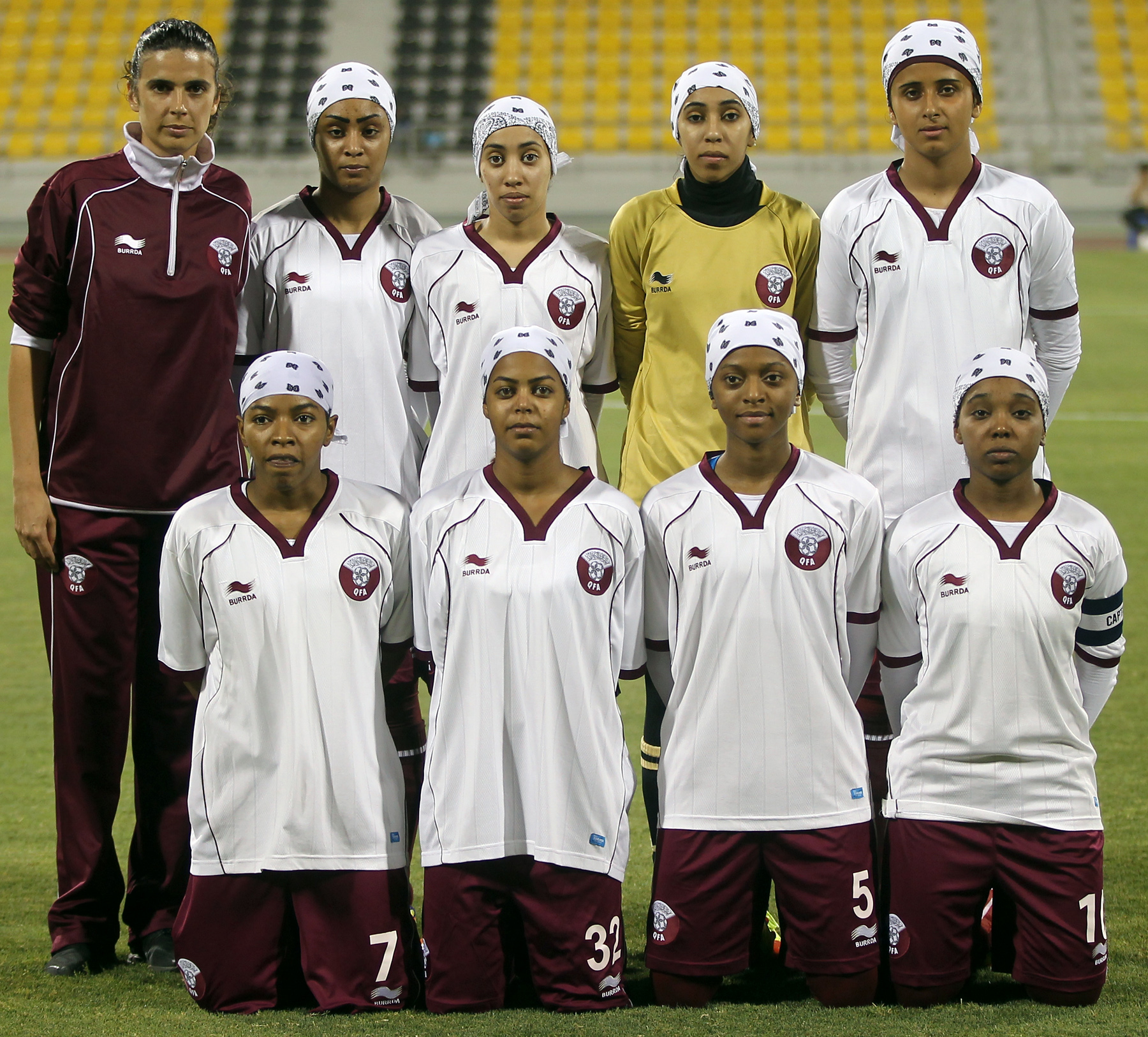
Qatar women's national football team in 2012.

Qatar created the team in 2009, as it was preparing to bid for the 2022 FIFA World Cup. However, after some initial activity, as of 2026 it has not played an official match in 12 years. When asked about the team by The New York Times, both in 2022 and in 2026, including on whether the team "still exists, if it falls under the QFA umbrella, what funding and development plans are in place and their upcoming fixture schedule", Qatari officials from various agencies did not reply.

The Qatar women's team has appeared in some special events, like playing friendlies against the American club Washington Spirit in December 2020, and against Afghanistan after their evacuation from the war-torn country after the Taliban takeover; Qatar won that match 5–0. Qatar does not have a player development program.

== Results and fixtures ==
The following is a list of match results in the last 12 months, as well as any future matches that have been scheduled.

Legend

Win Draw Lose Fixture

- Qatar Fixtures and Results

== Coaching staff ==
=== Current coaching staff ===
As of 19 August 2022

Position	Name
Head coach	(Qatar) Fedha Al-Abdullah
Technical director	Vacant
Assistant coach	Vacant
Goalkeeping coach	Vacant
Fitness coach	Vacant
Delegation Leader	Vacant

=== Manager history ===
Name	Period	Tournament
(Portugal) Helena Costa	2010–2012	2010 Arabia Women's Cup: Eighth Place (Last)
(Germany) Monika Staab	2012–2014	2014 WAFF Women's Championship: Fourth Place (Last)
(Qatar) Fedha Al-Abdullah	2014–present	

== Players ==
=== Last squad ===
The following players were named in April 2014 for the 2014 WAFF Women's Championship.

Caps and goals accurate up to and including 19 August 2022.

No.	Pos.	Player	Date of birth (age)	Caps	Goals	Club
1	GK	Latifa Al-Abdulla	28 November 2002 (age 23)			(Qatar Football Association)
12	GK	Shaima Al-Siyabi	27 June 1999 (age 27)			(Qatar Football Association) Al-Khor
2	DF	Amna Al-Naimi	30 June 2000 (age 26)			(Qatar Football Association)
3	DF	Dana Al-Dosari	5 May 1993 (age 33)			(Qatar Football Association)
11	DF	Mooza Muaarej	20 December 1997 (age 28)			(Qatar Football Association)
13	DF	Zahra Al-Naimi	9 October 1998 (age 28)			(Qatar Football Association)
14	DF	Moudhi Al-Abdulla	8 November 2000 (age 25)			(Qatar Football Association)
15	DF	Asalet Hijazi	28 November 2000 (age 25)			(Qatar Football Association)
27	DF	Nasra AlSiyabi	26 January 2000 (age 26)			(Qatar Football Association)
5	MF	Dana Al-Jassim	20 December 1997 (age 28)			(Qatar Football Association)
8	MF	Asma Al-Sorore	28 November 1995 (age 30)			(Qatar Football Association)
9	MF	Kholoud Al-Jassim	3 October 1996 (age 30)			(Qatar Football Association) Qatar SC
10	MF	Suaad Al-Hashemi (captain)	8 November 2003 (age 22)			(Qatar Football Association)
32	MF	Duana Khalifa	7 July 1997 (age 29)			(Qatar Football Association)
4	FW	Hagar Saleh	16 February 1996 (age 30)			(Qatar Football Association)
6	FW	Reem Al-Naemi	11 December 1999 (age 26)			(Qatar Football Association)
7	FW	Yasmeen El-Homsany	28 November 1999 (age 26)			(Qatar Football Association)

=== Recent call-ups ===
The following players have been called up to the squad in recent years.

Pos.	Player	Date of birth (age)	Caps	Goals	Club	Latest call-up

*Active players in bold, statistics correct as of 30 September 2021.

=== Most capped players ===
#	Player	Year(s)	Caps

=== Top goalscorers ===
#	Player	Year(s)	Goals	Caps

== Competitive record ==
=== FIFA Women's World Cup ===
FIFA Women's World Cup record
Year	Round	Position	Pld	W	D*	L	GS	GA	GD
(China) 1991	Did not exist								
(Sweden) 1995	Did not exist								
(United States) 1999	Did not exist								
(United States) 2003	Did not exist								
(China) 2007	Did not exist								
(Germany) 2011	Did not enter								
(Canada) 2015	Did not enter								
(France) 2019	Did not enter								
(Australia) (New Zealand) 2023	Did not enter								
(Brazil) 2027	Did not enter								
(Costa Rica) (Jamaica) (Mexico) (United States) 2031	TBD								
(United Kingdom) 2035	TBD								
Total	–	–	–	–	–	–	–	–	–

*Draws include knockout matches decided on penalty kicks.

=== AFC women's Asian Cup ===
AFC Women's Asian Cup record
Year	Round	Position	Pld	W	D*	L	GS	GA	GD
Hosts / Year	Result	GP	W	D*	L	GS	GA	GD	
(British Hong Kong) 1975	Did not exist								
(Taiwan) 1977	Did not exist								
(India) 1980	Did not exist								
(British Hong Kong) 1981	Did not exist								
(Thailand) 1983	Did not exist								
(British Hong Kong) 1986	Did not exist								
(British Hong Kong) 1989	Did not exist								
(Japan) 1991	Did not exist								
(Malaysia) 1993	Did not exist								
(Malaysia) 1995	Did not exist								
(China) 1997	Did not exist								
(Philippines) 1999	Did not exist								
(Taiwan) 2001	Did not exist								
(Thailand) 2003	Did not exist								
(Australia) 2006	Did not exist								
(Vietnam) 2008	Did not exist								
(China) 2010	Did not enter								
(Vietnam) 2014	Did not enter								
(Jordan) 2018	Did not enter								
(India) 2022	Did not enter								
(Australia) 2026	Did not enter								
(Uzbekistan) 2029	TBD								
Total	–	–	–	–	–	–	–	–	–

=== WAFF Women's Championship ===
WAFF Women's Championship record
Year	Round	Position	Pld	W	D*	L	GS	GA	GD
(Jordan) 2005	Did not exist								
(Jordan) 2007	Did not exist								
(United Arab Emirates) 2010	Did not exist								
(United Arab Emirates) 2011	Did not enter								
(Jordan) 2014	Group stage	4th	3	0	0	3	2	19	-17
(Bahrain) 2019	Did not enter								
(Jordan) 2022	Did not enter								
Total	Group stage	4th	3	0	0	3	2	19	-17

WAFF Women's Championship history
Season	Round	Opponent	Scores	Result	Venue
(Jordan) 2014	Group Stage	Palestine	0–4	Loss	Amman, Jordan
(Jordan) 2014	Group Stage	Jordan	0–7	Loss	Amman, Jordan
(Jordan) 2014	Group Stage	Bahrain	2–8	Loss	Amman, Jordan

=== Arabia Women's Cup ===
Arabia Women's Cup record
Year	Round	Position	Pld	W	D*	L	GS	GA	GD
(Bahrain) 2010	Group stage	8th	3	0	0	3	0	47	-47
Total	Group stage	8th	3	0	0	3	0	47	-47

Arabia Women's Cup history
Season	Round	Opponent	Scores	Result	Venue
(Bahrain) 2010	Group Stage	Bahrain	0–17	Loss	Riffa, Bahrain
(Bahrain) 2010	Group Stage	Palestine	0–18	Loss	Manama, Bahrain
(Bahrain) 2010	Group Stage	Syria	0–12	Loss	Manama, Bahrain

== See also ==
- Sport in Qatar
  - Football in Qatar
    - Women's football in Qatar.
- Qatar women's national under-20 football team
- Qatar women's national under-17 football team
- Qatar men's national football team
