= Women's football in the United Arab Emirates =

- Country: United Arab Emirates
- Governing body: United Arab Emirates Football Association
- National team: Women's national team

International competitions
- Olympics; FIFA Women's World Cup (National Team); AFC Women's Asian Cup (National Team)

Women's football in the United Arab Emirates is growing in popularity but is mainly played in affluent areas.

In order to improve the United Arab Emirates women's national football team, many of the top players are involved in cultural exchanges with the United States in 2011.

There are several clubs in the UAE that have women and girls teams: Go Pro Dubai, CF Football Academy, IFA Sport, Alliance Academy, Banaat FC etc.

In 2023 the first UAE Women's League was organised by United Arab Emirates Football Association.

2023-24 UAE Women's League season includes 10 teams:

- Abu Dhabi Country Club
- Banaat FC
- Alliance
- Go-Pro Sports Academy
- Mubadara Academy
- Empire FC
- Leoni FC
- PSA
- Peak Pro X
- Precision Football

== See also ==
- Football in the United Arab Emirates
- United Arab Emirates women's national football team
- UAE Women's Football League (WFL)
