= Nouf Al Anzi =

Emirati footballer (born 1996)

Personal information
- Full name: Nouf Faleh Al Anzi
- Date of birth: November 14, 1996 (age 29)
- Place of birth: Abu Dhabi, United Arab Emirates

Senior career*
Years	Team	Apps	(Gls)
- Al Wahda
- Abu Dhabi Country Club
2017	Wadi Degla		
2022	Leganés		

International career
2018–	United Arab Emirates		
- * Club domestic league appearances and goals

Nouf Faleh Faisal Mushaal Al Adwan (Arabic: نوف فالح فيصل مشعل العدوان; born 14 November 1996 in Abu Dhabi), commonly known as Nouf Al Anzi is an Emirati footballer who plays as a midfielder for Abu Dhabi Country Club. She debuted for the United Arab Emirates women's national team.

== Career ==
=== Club ===
Al Anzi started her football career with Al Wahda first women's team which was formed in 2014. She was age 16. She helped the team finish second in the UAE Women's Football League. She also played for the Abu Dhabi Country Club.

In 2017, Al Anzi became the first Emirati woman to play professional football overseas when she was signed in by Egyptian club, Wadi Degla. She also became the first Emirati woman to play for a European club, when she joined Leganés in September 2022

She returned to Abu Dhabi Country Club, playing in their campaign in the 2024–25 AFC Women's Champions League.

== International career ==
Al Anzi has played for the United Arab Emirates women's national team including in the 2018 AFC Women's Asian Cup qualifiers in 2017. Her sister Alanoud Al Anzi is also a national team player.

== Other ==
Al Anzi is a holder of a refereeing certificate from the United Arab Emirates Football Association

== Personal life ==
Al Anzi is a degree holder on information security.
