= Areej Al Hammadi =

Emirati association football player (born 1986)

Personal information
- Full name: Areej Ahmed Mohammed Salim Al Hammadi
- Date of birth: 13 February 1986 (age 40)
- Place of birth: Dubai, United Arab Emirates
- Positions: Midfielder; forward; winger

Team information
- Current team: Abu Dhabi Country Club
- Number: 21

Senior career*
Years	Team	Apps	(Gls)
2004-2009	American University in Dubai		
2009-2011	Dubai Waves		
2011-2013	Dubai SandStorm		
2013–2016	Al Wahda		
2016–2021	Abu Dhabi Country Club		
2021–2022	La Liga HPC	14	(4)
2022–2023	Onyx FC	12	(3)
2023–2025	Precision Football	11	(0)
2025-	Abu Dhabi Country Club	2	(0)

International career^{‡}
2017–	United Arab Emirates	41	(1)
- * Club domestic league appearances and goals ‡ National team caps and goals as of 27 May 2024

Areej Ahmed Mohammed Salim Al Hammadi (born 13 February 1986) often known mononymously as Areej, is an Emirati association football player who plays as a midfielder, forward and winger currently for Precision Football . She has previously played for Al Wahda and Abu Dhabi Country Club and has represented the United Arab Emirates women's national football team. Having on all major national club awards as a player she is widely regarded as one of the most influential women's footballers in the United Arab Emirates.

== Club career ==
Al Hammadi began her career playing with her family and in tournaments that allowed for women's participation. She then played for her university's women's team, before playing in seven-a-side community leagues, such as the Dubai Women's Football Association where she was scouted for the national team.

She began her professional career with Al Wahda before moving to Abu Dhabi Country Club in July 2016. She appeared at the 2019 WAFF Women's Clubs Championship in Aqaba, Jordan with the Abu Dhabi Country Club, scoring a brace to lead the team to victory in its final group game.

She played with the Fuelees team in Neymar Jr's Five, a five-a-side tournament.

In 2022, she played with Onyx FC in the UAE Women's Football League, finishing second.

In 2023–2024 season, she played with Precision Football finishing second in the UAE Women's Football League.

== International career ==
In August 2015, Al Hammadi won her first cap for United Arab Emirates. She participated in the 2015 Aphrodite Cup in Cyprus, the 2018 AFC Women's Asian Cup qualification in Tajikistan, and the 2019 WAFF Women's Championship in Bahrain.

She participated in qualifying for the 2022 Asian Cup, though the UAE failed to make the finals.

Al Hammadi has also trained and played for the UAE national futsal team.

== Records ==
She holds two Guinness World Records in sports. One of which in Hotstepping in 2020.
