= 2019 WAFF Women's Clubs Championship =

- The official emblem

Tournament details
- Host country: Jordan
- City: Aqaba
- Dates: 3–11 October
- Teams: 5 (from 1 association)
- Venue: 1 (in 1 host city)

Final positions
- Champions: (Jordan) Shabab Ordon (1st title)

Tournament statistics
- Matches played: 10
- Goals scored: 58 (5.8 per match)
- Top scorer: (Ghana) Alice Kusi (9 goals)
- Best player: (Lebanon) Nancy Tchaylian
- Best goalkeeper: (United Arab Emirates) Noura Al Mazrooei
- Fair play award: (United Arab Emirates) Abu Dhabi Country Club

The 2019 WAFF Women's Clubs Championship was the inaugural WAFF Women's Clubs Championship, the West Asian women's club football championship organised by the WAFF. It took place in Aqaba, Jordan, from 3 to 11 October 2019 as a single round-robin.

== Teams ==
Five teams from five nations participated in the inaugural competition.

Association	Team
Bahrain	Riffa
Jordan	Shabab Ordon
Lebanon	SAS
Palestine	Arab Orthodox
United Arab Emirates	Abu Dhabi Country Club

== Group stage ==
All times are local, AST (UTC+3).

Pos	Team	Pld	W	D	L	GF	GA	GD	Pts
1	(Jordan) Shabab Ordon (C)	4	4	0	0	17	2	+15	12
2	(Lebanon) SAS	4	2	1	1	12	7	+5	7
3	(United Arab Emirates) Abu Dhabi Country Club	4	2	0	2	15	5	+10	6
4	(Bahrain) Riffa	4	1	1	2	13	7	+6	4
5	(Palestine) Arab Orthodox	4	0	0	4	1	37	−36	0

Source: Global Sports Archive
(C) Champions
3 October 2019
17:00

Abu Dhabi Country Club (United Arab Emirates)	1–2	(Jordan) Shabab Ordon
Rashid 51'	Report	Kusi 9', 48' (pen.)

Aqaba Development Corporation Stadium, Aqaba
3 October 2019
20:00

Arab Orthodox (Palestine)	0–7	(Lebanon) SAS
	Report	Al Jurdi 17'; Tamim 28'; Sohgian 33' (o.g.); Bou Rada 50'; Al Haddad 57'; Bahlawan 71'; Shalhoub 90+1'

Aqaba Development Corporation Stadium, Aqaba

5 October 2019
17:00

SAS (Lebanon)	2–1	(United Arab Emirates) Abu Dhabi Country Club
Bahlawan 83'; Tchaylian 85'	Report	Al Adwan 64'

Aqaba Development Corporation Stadium, Aqaba
5 October 2019
20:00

Shabab Ordon (Jordan)	2–0	(Bahrain) Riffa
Sweilem 71', 73'	Report

Aqaba Development Corporation Stadium, Aqaba

7 October 2019
17:00

Riffa (Bahrain)	9–0	(Palestine) Arab Orthodox
Al Isa 3', 9', 12', 25'; Montoya 22'; Fayez 45'; Sowar 47'; Rincón 62'; Al Ali 91'	Report	Ghattas (red card) 91'

Aqaba Development Corporation Stadium, Aqaba
7 October 2019
20:00

Shabab Ordon (Jordan)	3–0	(Lebanon) SAS
Kusi 9', 91'; Sweilem (yellow card) 42' (yellow-red card) 43'; Al-Naber 49'	Report

Aqaba Development Corporation Stadium, Aqaba

9 October 2019
17:00

Arab Orthodox (Palestine)	1–10	(Jordan) Shabab Ordon
Awad 66'	Report	Kusi 4', 8', 48', 52', 68'; Al-Majali 6', 11'; Al Saheb 16'; Hina 18'; Ziaded 81'

Aqaba Development Corporation Stadium, Aqaba
9 October 2019
20:00

Riffa (Bahrain)	1–2	(United Arab Emirates) Abu Dhabi Country Club
Rincón 27'	Report	Rafinha 10'; Edilaine 41'

Aqaba Development Corporation Stadium, Aqaba

11 October 2019
17:00

SAS (Lebanon)	3–3	(Bahrain) Riffa
Tchaylian 17'; Iskandar 33'; Al Mokdad 79'	Report	Yaqoob 8', 82'; Al Isa 37'

Aqaba Development Corporation Stadium, Aqaba
11 October 2019
20:00

Abu Dhabi Country Club (United Arab Emirates)	11–0	(Palestine) Arab Orthodox
Rafinha; Juma; Al Hammadi; Aal Rabeea; Al Mansoori; Al Zarkan	Report	Sireen Ghattas (red card) 27'

Aqaba Development Corporation Stadium, Aqaba

== Goalscorers ==
There were 58 goals scored in 10 matches, for an average of 5.8 goals per match.

9 goals

- (Ghana) Alice Kusi

5 goals

- (Bahrain) Hessa AlIsa

4 goals

- (Brazil) Rafinha

2 goals

- (Bahrain) Manar Yaqoob
- (Colombia) Yoreli Rincón
- (Jordan) Ayah Al-Majali
- (Jordan) Mai Sweilem
- (Lebanon) Lara Bahlawan
- (Lebanon) Nancy Tchaylian
- (United Arab Emirates) Amal Aal Rabeea
- (United Arab Emirates) Areej Al Hammadi
- (United Arab Emirates) Naeema Jouma

1 goal

- (Bahrain) Rawan Al Ali
- (Bahrain) Amira Sowar
- (Bahrain) Yasmeen Fayez
- (Brazil) Edialne dos Santos
- (Colombia) Daniela Montoya
- (Jordan) Natasha Al Naber
- (Jordan) Lina Al Saheb
- (Jordan) Raya Hina
- (Jordan) Masa Ziaded
- (Lebanon) Celine Al Haddad
- (Lebanon) Aya Al Jurdi
- (Lebanon) Rana Al Mokdad
- (Lebanon) Yara Bou Rada
- (Lebanon) Lili Iskandar
- (Lebanon) Reem Shalhoub
- (Lebanon) Hanin Tamim
- (Palestine) Razan Awad
- (United Arab Emirates) Nouf Al Adwan
- (United Arab Emirates) Shamma Al Mansouri
- (United Arab Emirates) Shahd Al Zarkan
- (United Arab Emirates) Mohsen Qarawi

1 own goal

- (Palestine) Caroline Sohgian

Source: The AFC

== Awards ==
- Top Scorer: (Ghana) Alice Kusi (Shabab Al-Ordon)
- Best Goalkeeper: (United Arab Emirates) Nora Al Mazrooei (Abu Dhabi Country Club)
- Best Player: (Lebanon) Nancy Tchaylian (Stars Association)
- Fair Play Award: (United Arab Emirates) Abu Dhabi Country Club

== See also ==
- 2019 AFC Women's Club Championship
