= 2023–24 UAE Women's Football League =

2023–24 UAE Women's Football League The league was played in two stages, a preliminary stage to seed teams into two divisions where 10 teams contested where they will be seeded. Followed by a final stage of two divisions of five teams to contest the champions of the league.

The following ten teams have participated in the league competing in the top division and second division of the 2023–24 season:

== League table ==
First Division Team	Location	Ground	2023–24 Season Finish
Abu Dhabi Country Club	Abu Dhabi	Armed Forces Stadium	1st
Precision Football Club	Dubai	Daqqa Stadium Ibn Battuta Mall	2nd
Mubadara Sports Academy	Al Ain	To be announced	3th
Banaat FC	Abu Dhabi	AlNasr Main Stadium 2	4th
Go Pro Sports Football Academy	Dubai	To be announced	5th
