= United Arab Emirates women's national football team =

Women's national association football team representing United Arab Emirates

United Arab Emirates
- Association: UAEFA
- Confederation: AFC (Asia)
- Sub-confederation: WAFF (West Asia)
- Head coach: Vera Pauw
- Captain: Areej Al Hammadi
- FIFA code: UAE
| First colours | Second colours |

FIFA ranking
- Current: 124 ▼1 (16 June 2026)
- Highest: 70 (March 2016)
- Lowest: 120 (December 2025)

First international
- United Arab Emirates 4–2 Palestine (Abu Dhabi, United Arab Emirates; 20 February 2010)

Biggest win
- United Arab Emirates 7–0 Kuwait (Abu Dhabi, United Arab Emirates; 24 February 2010)

Biggest defeat
- Slovakia 9–0 United Arab Emirates (Senec, Slovakia; 5 August 2015)

WAFF Championship
- Appearances: 3 (first in 2010)
- Best result: Champions (2010, 2011)

The United Arab Emirates women's national football team (Arabic: منتخب الإمارات العربية المتحدة لكرة القدم للسيدات Muntakhab Al'Iimarat Alearabiat Almutahidat Likurat Alqadam lilsayidat) represents United Arab Emirates in the international women's football, and is run by the United Arab Emirates Football Association (UAEFA).

Its highest ranking in the FIFA Women's World Rankings is 73rd, achieved in March 2015 at its first appearance in the ranking. The team won back-to-back WAFF Women's Championships in 2010 and 2011.

== History ==
The foundations of women’s football in the United Arab Emirates were laid in the mid-2000s. In 2004, Abu Dhabi Country Club began promoting women’s football, and by 2009 the UAEFA created a dedicated Women’s Football Committee to formalise the game at national level.

The UAE women’s national team played its first official international match on 20 February 2010, defeating Palestine 4–2 in Abu Dhabi. Soon afterwards, the team achieved regional success, winning the 2010 WAFF Women's Championship and successfully defending the title in the 2011 WAFF Women's Championship, held from 3–12 October in Abu Dhabi, where they defeated Iran in the final.

In 2014, the UAEFA declared that the elite national team would consist exclusively of Emirati citizens, phasing out naturalised players in order to develop home-grown talent and ensure alignment with FIFA eligibility rules.

Between 2015 and 2018, FIFA supported the UAE women’s football programme through the “Live Your Goals” initiative, providing technical and financial assistance to encourage grassroots participation and expand the player base. These years also saw a gradual shift from informal seven-a-side competitions towards structured 11-a-side leagues.

In 2023, the UAE Women's Football League was relaunched, with clubs such as Abu Dhabi Country Club competing alongside independent sides like Banaat FC, which secured landmark sponsorship deals with Nike and TikTok. Abu Dhabi Country Club became the first Emirati club to compete in the AFC Women's Champions League in 2024–25.

In January 2025, Dutch coach Vera Pauw was appointed head coach to lead the professionalisation of the national side, building on the foundations laid by Emirati coach Houriya Al Taheri and her successors.

== Home stadium ==
While the team occasionally uses larger venues for major fixtures, recent friendlies (including the April 2025 series against the Philippines) have been held at the UAEFA Headquarters in Al Khawaneej, Dubai.

== Results and fixtures ==
The following is a list of match results in the last 12 months, as well as any future matches that have been scheduled.

Legend

Win Draw Loss Void or postponed Fixture

=== 2025 ===
| 26 November 2025 WAFF Championship GS | United Arab Emirates | 0–3 | Iraq | Jeddah, Saudi Arabia |
| 16:45 UTC+3 | | Report | Omar 20'; Al-Jawahiri 47'; Salihi 90+5' | Stadium: Hall Stadium – King Abdullah Sports City; Referee: Yasmin Nairoukh (Palestine) |

| 28 November 2025 WAFF Championship GS | Saudi Arabia | 5–0 | United Arab Emirates | Jeddah, Saudi Arabia |
| 19:45 UTC+3 | Abdullah 3', 10'; Abdulrazak 26'; Khalid 28'; Abu Al-Samh 43' | Report | | Stadium: Hall Stadium – King Abdullah Sports City; Referee: Mohammed Al-Manii (Oman) |

=== 2026 ===
| 5 March 2026 Friendly | United Arab Emirates | 0–0 | Tajikistan | Dubai, United Arab Emirates |
| 20:00 UTC+4 | | Report; Report (FFT) | S. Saidova (penalty missed) 83' | Stadium: UAE Football Association Stadium |

== Current staff ==
| Position | Name |
|---|---|
| Head coach | Vera Pauw |
| Assistant coach | Houriya Al-Taheri |
| Goalkeeping coach | Noora Al Mazroui |
| Fitness coach | (United Arab Emirates) Junaid Shaikh |
| Physical coach | Leila Tomaz |
| Doctor | (United Arab Emirates) Yasin Al Mansoori |
| Sport Scientist | (United Arab Emirates) Shehzad Naeem |
| Match Analyst | (United Arab Emirates) Obaid Al Muhairi |

== Managerial history ==
The following table outlines the head coaches of the UAE women's national football team.

| Name | Period | Matches | Wins | Draws | Losses | Win % | Notes | Ref. |
|---|---|---|---|---|---|---|---|---|
| (Tunisia) Samir Landolsi | 2015–2017 | – | – | – | – | – | Coached UAE at the 2015 Aphrodite Cup (Cyprus) and during the 2017 AFC Women's Asian Cup qualifiers. | |
| (United Arab Emirates) Houriya Al-Taheri | 2019–2021 | – | – | – | – | – | Former UAE international; assistant coach 2015–2018, promoted to head coach by 2019 WAFF Women’s Championship; profiled as head coach in 2021. | |
| (Brazil) Camila Orlando | 2021–2024 | 5 | 1 | 0 | 4 | 20% | Oversaw friendlies and qualifiers during her tenure. | |
| (Netherlands) Vera Pauw | 2025–present | 13 | 3 | 3 | 7 | 23.07% | Appointed January 2025; previously managed Netherlands, South Africa, and Ireland. | |

== Players ==
=== Current squad ===
The following players were named to the squad for the friendlies against Philippines on 4 and 8 April 2025.

| No. | Pos. | Player | Date of birth (age) | Caps | Goals | Club |
|---|---|---|---|---|---|---|
| 1 | GK | Rouda Al Thumairi | 1 July 1992 (age 34) | 1 | 0 | (United Arab Emirates Football Association) |
| 22 | GK | Maha Al Boloushi | 17 May 2004 (age 22) | 4 | 0 | (United Arab Emirates Football Association) Abu Dhabi Country Club |
| 35 | GK | Rachel van Herk | | 0 | 0 | (United Arab Emirates Football Association) |
| 40 | GK | Aya AlDuhail | 4 January 2005 (age 21) | 0 | 0 | (United Arab Emirates Football Association) Banaat |
| 6 | DF | Ghanima Obaid | 22 October 2003 (age 22) | 13 | 0 | (United Arab Emirates Football Association) Abu Dhabi Country Club |
| 30 | DF | Ava Steven | | | | (United States Soccer Federation) Delta State University |
| 27 | DF | Marwa Almnhali | | | | (United Arab Emirates Football Association) |
| 12 | DF | Dhabia Meshal | 16 January 2004 (age 22) | | | (United Arab Emirates Football Association) Banaat |
| 4 | DF | Nikita Fernandez | | | | (United Arab Emirates Football Association) |
| 18 | DF | Misha Fernandez | | | | (United Arab Emirates Football Association) |
| 14 | DF | Olivia Meuleman | | | | (United Arab Emirates Football Association) |
| 20 | DF | Annaya Ahmed | | | | (United Arab Emirates Football Association) |
| 11 | DF | Claudia May | | | | (United Arab Emirates Football Association) Precision Football |
| 2 | DF | Fatima Jassem | 23 April 2002 (age 24) | 12 | 1 | (United Arab Emirates Football Association) Abu Dhabi Country Club |
| 26 | DF | Fatima AlNubi | | | | (United Arab Emirates Football Association) |
| 9 | MF | Rawan Al Hammadi | 12 November 2002 (age 23) | 19 | 1 | (United Arab Emirates Football Association) Abu Dhabi Country Club |
| 30 | MF | Maitha Mohamed | | | | (United Arab Emirates Football Association) |
| 17 | MF | Misha Bhandari | | | | (United Arab Emirates Football Association) |
| 24 | MF | Safa Shafi | | | | (United Arab Emirates Football Association) |
| 8 | MF | Nouf Al Anzi | | | | (United Arab Emirates Football Association) Abu Dhabi Country Club |
| 13 | MF | Areej Al Hammadi | 13 February 1986 (age 40) | 15 | 1 | (United Arab Emirates Football Association) Abu Dhabi Country Club |
| 3 | MF | Tala Chabara | | | | (United Arab Emirates Football Association) |
| 5 | MF | Caye Yocor | 2 August 2004 (age 22) | | | (United Arab Emirates Football Association) Banaat |
| 9 | MF | Stella Fedyun | 26 April 2008 (age 18) | | | (United Arab Emirates Football Association) Banaat |
| 19 | MF | Fatima Al Zahraa | | | | (United Arab Emirates Football Association) |
| 16 | FW | Sara Sameh | | | | (United Arab Emirates Football Association) |
| 21 | FW | Jenna Mahmoud | | | | (United Arab Emirates Football Association) |
| 7 | FW | Mia Lindborg | | | | (United States Soccer Federation) Seton Hill University |
| 8 | FW | Elizabeth Forshaw | | | | (United States Soccer Federation) Columbus State Cougars |
| 7 | FW | Naeema Juma | | | | (United Arab Emirates Football Association) Abu Dhabi Country Club |
| 15 | FW | Georgia Gibson | | | | (The Football Association) Middlesbrough |

(Players are listed within position group by order of kit number, caps, goals, seniority, and then alphabetically)

=== Recent call-ups ===
The following players have been named to the squad in the past 12 months.

| Pos. | Player | Date of birth (age) | Caps | Goals | Club | Latest call-up |

(Players are listed within position group by order of latest call-up, caps, goals, seniority, and then alphabetically)

== Honours ==
=== Regional ===
- WAFF Women's Championship

Champions: 2010, 2011

== Record per opponent ==
Key

Positive balance (more wins than losses)
Neutral balance (as many wins as losses)
Negative balance (more losses than wins)

The following table shows United Arab Emirates's all-time official international record per opponent:

| Opponent | Pld | W | D | L | GF | GA | GD | W% | Confederation |
|---|---|---|---|---|---|---|---|---|---|
| Azerbaijan | 3 | 0 | 0 | 3 | 4 | 9 | −5 | 0 | UEFA |
| Bangladesh | 2 | 2 | 0 | 0 | 6 | 2 | +4 | 100 | AFC |
| Bahrain | 6 | 2 | 4 | 0 | 12 | 4 | +8 | 33.33 | AFC |
| Georgia | 6 | 0 | 1 | 5 | 3 | 17 | −14 | 0 | UEFA |
| Greece | 1 | 0 | 0 | 1 | 0 | 7 | −7 | 0 | UEFA |
| Guam | 2 | 1 | 1 | 0 | 2 | 1 | +1 | 50 | AFC |
| India | 1 | 0 | 0 | 1 | 1 | 4 | −3 | 0 | AFC |
| Iran | 2 | 0 | 1 | 1 | 3 | 6 | −3 | 0 | AFC |
| Iraq | 6 | 5 | 0 | 1 | 17 | 4 | +13 | 83.33 | AFC |
| Jordan | 3 | 1 | 0 | 2 | 2 | 10 | −8 | 33.33 | AFC |
| Kuwait | 1 | 1 | 0 | 0 | 7 | 0 | +7 | 100 | AFC |
| Latvia | 1 | 0 | 0 | 1 | 0 | 2 | −2 | 0 | UEFA |
| Lebanon | 3 | 2 | 0 | 1 | 8 | 2 | +6 | 66.67 | AFC |
| Luxembourg | 2 | 0 | 0 | 2 | 2 | 11 | −9 | 0 | UEFA |
| Malaysia | 2 | 0 | 0 | 2 | 1 | 5 | −4 | 0 | AFC |
| Malta | 2 | 0 | 0 | 2 | 0 | 8 | −8 | 0 | UEFA |
| Maldives | 5 | 4 | 0 | 1 | 8 | 2 | +6 | 80 | AFC |
| Palestine | 3 | 2 | 1 | 0 | 8 | 4 | +4 | 66.67 | AFC |
| Philippines | 3 | 0 | 0 | 3 | 1 | 12 | −7 | 0 | AFC |
| Saudi Arabia | 1 | 0 | 0 | 1 | 0 | 5 | −5 | 0 | AFC |
| Slovakia | 2 | 0 | 0 | 2 | 0 | 15 | −15 | 0 | UEFA |
| Singapore | 2 | 1 | 1 | 0 | 4 | 0 | +4 | 66.67 | AFC |
| Syria | 4 | 2 | 0 | 2 | 9 | 5 | +4 | 50 | AFC |
| Tajikistan | 2 | 1 | 1 | 0 | 1 | 0 | +1 | 50 | AFC |
| Tunisia | 1 | 0 | 0 | 1 | 0 | 4 | −4 | 0 | CAF |
| Uzbekistan | 2 | 0 | 0 | 2 | 1 | 13 | −12 | 0 | AFC |
| Vietnam | 1 | 0 | 0 | 1 | 0 | 6 | −6 | 0 | AFC |
| Total | 69 | 24 | 10 | 35 | 100 | 158 | −58 | 34.78 | — |

== Competitive record ==
=== FIFA Women's World Cup ===
FIFA Women's World Cup record
| Year | Round | Position | Pld | W | D* | L | GS | GA | GD |
|---|---|---|---|---|---|---|---|---|---|
| (China) 1991 | Did not exist | | | | | | | | |
| (Sweden) 1995 | Did not exist | | | | | | | | |
| (United States) 1999 | Did not exist | | | | | | | | |
| (United States) 2003 | Did not exist | | | | | | | | |
| (China) 2007 | Did not exist | | | | | | | | |
| (Germany) 2011 | Did not enter | | | | | | | | |
| (Canada) 2015 | Did not enter | | | | | | | | |
| (France) 2019 | Did not qualify | | | | | | | | |
| (Australia) (New Zealand) 2023 | Did not qualify | | | | | | | | |
| (Brazil) 2027 | Did not qualify | | | | | | | | |
| (Costa Rica) (Jamaica) (Mexico) (United States) 2031 | TBD | | | | | | | | |
| (United Kingdom) 2035 | TBD | | | | | | | | |
| Total | 0/12 | – | – | – | – | – | – | – | – |

*Draws include knockout matches decided on penalty kicks.

=== AFC Women's Asian Cup ===
AFC Women's Asian Cup record
| Year | Round | Position | Pld | W | D* | L | GS | GA | GD |
|---|---|---|---|---|---|---|---|---|---|
| (Hong Kong) 1975 | Did not exist | | | | | | | | |
| (Taiwan) 1977 | Did not exist | | | | | | | | |
| (India) 1980 | Did not exist | | | | | | | | |
| (Hong Kong) 1981 | Did not exist | | | | | | | | |
| (Thailand) 1983 | Did not exist | | | | | | | | |
| (Hong Kong) 1986 | Did not exist | | | | | | | | |
| (Hong Kong) 1989 | Did not exist | | | | | | | | |
| (Japan) 1991 | Did not exist | | | | | | | | |
| (Malaysia) 1993 | Did not exist | | | | | | | | |
| (Malaysia) 1995 | Did not exist | | | | | | | | |
| (China) 1997 | Did not exist | | | | | | | | |
| (Philippines) 1999 | Did not exist | | | | | | | | |
| (Chinese Taipei) 2001 | Did not exist | | | | | | | | |
| (Thailand) 2003 | Did not exist | | | | | | | | |
| (Australia) 2006 | Did not exist | | | | | | | | |
| (Vietnam) 2008 | Did not exist | | | | | | | | |
| (China) 2010 | Did not exist | | | | | | | | |
| (Vietnam) 2014 | Did not enter | | | | | | | | |
| (Jordan) 2018 | Did not qualify | | | | | | | | |
| (India) 2022 | Did not qualify | | | | | | | | |
| (Australia) 2026 | Did not qualify | | | | | | | | |
| (Uzbekistan) 2029 | TBD | | | | | | | | |
| Total | 0/20 | – | – | – | – | – | – | – | – |

*Draws include knockout matches decided on penalty kicks.

=== Asian Games ===
Asian Games record
| Year | Round | Position | Pld | W | D* | L | GS | GA | GD |
|---|---|---|---|---|---|---|---|---|---|
| (China) 1990 | Did not exist | | | | | | | | |
| (Japan) 1994 | Did not exist | | | | | | | | |
| (Thailand) 1998 | Did not exist | | | | | | | | |
| (South Korea) 2002 | Did not exist | | | | | | | | |
| (Qatar) 2006 | Did not exist | | | | | | | | |
| (China) 2010 | Did not enter | | | | | | | | |
| (South Korea) 2014 | Did not enter | | | | | | | | |
| (Indonesia) 2018 | Did not enter | | | | | | | | |
| (China) 2022 | Did not enter | | | | | | | | |
| (Japan) 2026 | TBD | | | | | | | | |
| (Qatar) 2030 | TBD | | | | | | | | |
| (Saudi Arabia) 2034 | TBD | | | | | | | | |
| Total | 0/10 | – | – | – | – | – | – | – | – |

*Draws include knockout matches decided on penalty kicks.

=== WAFF Women's Championship ===
WAFF Women's Championship record
| Year | Round | Position | Pld | W | D* | L | GS | GA | GD |
|---|---|---|---|---|---|---|---|---|---|
| (Jordan) 2005 | Did not exist | | | | | | | | |
| (Jordan) 2007 | Did not exist | | | | | | | | |
| (United Arab Emirates) 2010 | Champions | 1st | 4 | 4 | 0 | 0 | 16 | 2 | +14 |
| (United Arab Emirates) 2011 | Champions | 1st | 5 | 3 | 1 | 1 | 18 | 6 | +12 |
| (Jordan) 2014 | Did not enter | | | | | | | | |
| (Bahrain) 2019 | Fourth round | 4th | 4 | 0 | 2 | 2 | 2 | 7 | -5 |
| (Jordan) 2022 | Withdrew | | | | | | | | |
| (Saudi Arabia) 2024 | Did not enter | | | | | | | | |
| (Saudi Arabia) 2025 | Group stage | 5th | 2 | 0 | 0 | 2 | 0 | 8 | -8 |
| Total | Champions | 1st | 15 | 7 | 3 | 5 | 36 | 23 | +13 |

== See also ==
- United Arab Emirates women's national under-20 football team
- United Arab Emirates women's national under-17 football team
