= Naeema Juma =

Emirati footballer (born 1999)

Personal information
- Full name: Naeema Ibrahim Gharib Juma
- Date of birth: 30 December 1999 (age 26)
- Place of birth: Dubai, United Arab Emirates
- Position: Forward

Team information
- Current team: Abu Dhabi
- Number: 30

Senior career*
Years	Team	Apps	(Gls)
2019–	Abu Dhabi	+8	(+4)

International career
2014–2015	United Arab Emirates U16	4	(1)
2016–	United Arab Emirates	39	(6)
- * Club domestic league appearances and goals

Naeema Ibrahim Gharib Juma (Arabic: نعيمة ابراهيم غريب جمعة; born 30 December 1999) is an Emirati professional footballer who plays as a striker for UAE Women's Football League club Abu Dhabi and the United Arab Emirates national team.

== Club career ==
=== Abu Dhabi ===
On 3 October 2024, Juma scored a brace against Wuhan, turning the tide in favor of the Emirati side as they secured their first win in the AFC Women's Champions League group stage, collecting all three points.

== International career ==
She made the Emirati final squad for the 2019 WAFF Women's Championship. On 7 January 2019, Naeema scored her first competitive goal against Jordan, opening the score in the 31st minute.

== Career statistics ==
=== International ===
As of match played 11 February 2024

Appearances and goals by national team and year
National team	Year	Apps	Goals
United Arab Emirates	2016	8	1
United Arab Emirates	2017	8	1
United Arab Emirates	2018	1	0
United Arab Emirates	2019	7	1
United Arab Emirates	2021	7	2
United Arab Emirates	2022	5	0
United Arab Emirates	2024	2	0
Total		38	5

Scores and results list United Arab Emirates's goal tally first, score column indicates score after each Juma goal.

List of international goals scored by Naeema Juma
No.	Date	Venue	Opponent	Score	Result	Competition
1	3 March 2016	Theyab Awana Stadium, Dubai, United Arab Emirates	Maldives	1–0	1–0	Friendly
2	3 March 2016	Jalan Besar Stadium, Singapore	Singapore	1–0	4–0	Friendly
3	7 January 2019	Al Muharraq Stadium, Al Muharraq, Bahrain	Jordan	1–0	1–4	2019 WAFF Women's Championship
4	18 October 2021	Dolen Omurzakov Stadium, Bishkek, Kyrgyzstan	Guam	1–0	2–1	2022 AFC Women's Asian Cup qualification
5	22 August 2021	Theyab Awana Stadium, Dubai, United Arab Emirates	Maldives	4–0	5–1	Friendly
6	4 April 2025	Theyab Awana Stadium, Dubai, United Arab Emirates	Philippines	1–4	1–4	Friendly

== Hounours ==
Abu Dhabi

- UAE Women's Football League: 2018–19, 2021–22, 2022–23, 2023–24
- WAFF Women's Clubs Championship third place: 2019
