= List of football stadiums in Qatar =

This is a list of football stadiums in Qatar, ranked in descending order of capacity. It includes stadiums with a capacity of at least 1,000 and stadiums built for the 2022 FIFA World Cup. The two largest non-football stadiums in Qatar are the 15,500-capacity Aspire Dome indoor stadium and the 15,300 capacity Lusail Sports Arena.

== Current stadiums ==
| Image | Stadium | Capacity | City | Home team | Opened | Notes |
|---|---|---|---|---|---|---|
| | Lusail Stadium | 88,966 | Lusail | | 2021 | Used for the 2022 FIFA World Cup, 2023 AFC Asian Cup |
| | Al Bayt Stadium | 68,895 | Al Khor | | 2021 | Used for the 2022 FIFA World Cup, 2023 AFC Asian Cup |
| | Khalifa International Stadium | 45,857 | Al Rayyan | Qatar national football team | 2017 (Note: Originally built in 1976; reconstructed in 2017) | Used for the 2022 FIFA World Cup, 2011 AFC Asian Cup, 2023 AFC Asian Cup and 2025 FIFA U-17 World Cup Final |
| | Ahmad bin Ali Stadium | 45,032 | Al Rayyan | Al-Rayyan SC | 2020 | Used for the 2022 FIFA World Cup, 2023 AFC Asian Cup and 2026 FIFA U-17 World Cup Final |
| | Education City Stadium | 44,667 | Al Rayyan | | 2020 | Used for the 2022 FIFA World Cup, 2023 AFC Asian Cup |
| | Al Thumama Stadium | 44,400 | Doha | | 2021 | Used for the 2022 FIFA World Cup, 2023 AFC Asian Cup |
| | Al Janoub Stadium | 44,325 | Al Wakrah | | 2019 | Used for the 2022 FIFA World Cup, 2023 AFC Asian Cup |
| | Stadium 974 | 44,089 | Doha | | 2021 | Used for the 2022 FIFA World Cup |
| | Thani bin Jassim Stadium | 21,872 | Al Rayyan | Al-Gharafa; Umm Salal | 2003 | Use for the 2011 AFC Asian Cup |
| | Jassim bin Hamad Stadium | 13,030 | Al Rayyan | Al-Sadd | 2004 (Note: Originally built in 1975; reconstructed in 2004) | Use for the 2011 AFC Asian Cup and 2023 AFC Asian Cup |
| | Hamad bin Khalifa Stadium | 12,000 | Doha | Al Ahli | 1986 | |
| | Grand Hamad Stadium | 12,000 | Doha | Al-Arabi | 1986 | |
| | Suheim bin Hamad Stadium | 12,000 | Doha | Qatar SC | 1986; 2003 | Use for the 2011 AFC Asian Cup |
| | Al-Khor SC Stadium | 12,000 | Al Khor | Al-Kharaitiyat; Al Khor | 2011 | |
| | Qatar University Stadium | 10,000 | Doha | | | |
| | Abdullah bin Khalifa Stadium | 10,000 | Doha | Al-Duhail SC | 2013 | Used for the 2023 AFC Asian Cup |
| | Al-Shamal SC Stadium | 5,000 | Madinat ash Shamal | Al-Shamal | 2011 | |
| | Doha Sports Stadium | 2,000 | Doha | | 1962 | |
| | Al-Sailiya Stadium | 1,074 | Doha | Al-Sailiya | 2012 | |

== Former stadiums ==
| Image | Stadium | Capacity | City | Home team | Opened | Closed | Notes |
|---|---|---|---|---|---|---|---|
| | Ahmed bin Ali Stadium | 25,000 | Al Rayyan | Al-Rayyan SC (2003–14) | 2003 | 2015 | Used for the 2011 AFC Asian Cup; Was demolished to updated into the new stadium for the 2022 FIFA World Cup. |

== See also ==
- List of football stadiums by capacity
- List of indoor arenas in Qatar
- Lists of stadiums
