= List of football stadiums in the United Arab Emirates =

This is a list of football stadiums in the United Arab Emirates. The list includes venues used for professional football and other stadiums with a capacity over 5,000 to have been used for football. The largest non-football stadiums in the UAE are the 18,000-capacity indoor stadium named Etihad Arena, the 17,000-capacity Coca-Cola Arena and the 15,000-capacity Hamdan Sports Complex.

== Current stadiums ==
Image	Stadium	Capacity	City	Emirate	Home team	Ref
	Ajman Stadium	10,000	Ajman	Ajman	Ajman Club	
	Al Dhafra Stadium	5,020	Madinat Zayed	Abu Dhabi	Al Dhafra SCC	
	Al Nahyan Stadium	12,000	Abu Dhabi	Abu Dhabi	Al-Wahda F.C.	
	Al-Maktoum Stadium	12,000	Dubai	Dubai	Al-Nasr Dubai SC	
	Al-Rashid Stadium	12,000	Dubai	Dubai	Al-Ahli Dubai F.C.	
	Baniyas Stadium	9,570	Baniyas	Abu Dhabi	Baniyas F.C.	
	Emirates Club Stadium	3,000	Ras al-Khaimah	Ras al-Khaimah	Emirates Club	
	Fujairah Club Stadium	6,000	Fujairah	Fujairah	Al-Fujairah SC	
	Hazza bin Zayed Stadium	25,965	Al Ain	Abu Dhabi	Al Ain FC	
	Khalid bin Mohammed Stadium	10,000	Sharjah	Sharjah	Al-Sharjah SCC	
	Maktoum bin Rashid Al Maktoum Stadium	18,000	Dubai	Dubai	Al Shabab	
	Mohammed bin Zayed Stadium	42,056	Abu Dhabi	Abu Dhabi	Al Jazira Club	
	Police Officers Club Stadium	7,500	Dubai	Dubai		
	Sharjah Stadium	18,578	Sharjah	Sharjah	Al-Sharjah SCC	
	Sheikh Khalifa International Stadium	16,000	Al Ain	Abu Dhabi		
	Tahnoun bin Mohammed Stadium	15,000	Al Ain	Abu Dhabi	Al Ain FC	
	The Sevens Stadium	44,000	Dubai	Dubai		
	Zabeel Stadium	8,439	Dubai	Dubai	Al-Wasl F.C.	
	Zayed Sports City Stadium	44,250	Abu Dhabi	Abu Dhabi	United Arab Emirates national football team	

== See also ==
- List of indoor arenas in the United Arab Emirates
- List of association football stadiums by capacity
- List of association football stadiums by country
- List of football stadiums by capacity
- List of sports venues by capacity
- List of stadiums by capacity
- Lists of stadiums
- Football in the United Arab Emirates
