= Football in the United Arab Emirates =

Football in United Arab Emirates
- Country: United Arab Emirates
- Governing body: United Arab Emirates Football Association
- National team: United Arab Emirates
- Nicknames: Al Abyad (The Whites); Eyal Zayed (Sons of Zayed)
- First played: 1972

Club competitions
- UAE Pro-League; UAE First Division League; UAE Second Division League; UAE Third Division League; UAE President's Cup; UAE League Cup; UAE Super Cup; UAE Women's Football League

International competitions
- List: National team; FIFA World Cup: Group stage (1990); AFC Asian Cup record: Runners-up (1996); FIFA Confederations Cup: Group stage (1997); Gulf Cup: Winners (2007 & 2013); National U-23 team; AFC U-23 Championship: Quarter-finals (2013, 2016 & 2020); National U-20 team; FIFA U-20 World Cup: Quarter-finals (2003 & 2009); AFC U-19 Championship: Winners (2008); National U-17 team; FIFA U-17 World Cup: Group stages (1991 & 2013); AFC U-16 Championship: Runners-up (1990; WAFF Championship: Runners-up (2019); Women's National team; WAFF Women's Championships: Winners (2010 & 2011)

Association football is the most popular sport in the United Arab Emirates. The UAE has teams and players at both club and international level. Around 50% of the people in the United Arab Emirates consider themselves football fans. The only Asian Football Confederation countries with an equal or higher percentage are Indonesia, Malaysia, Saudi Arabia, Singapore, South Korea and Vietnam.

== Domestic ==
=== League ===
The United Arab Emirates Football Association (UAEFA), the governing body for the sport in the UAE, was founded as recently as 1971, affiliating to FIFA in 1974. A "test" league was run by the formed body in 1973–74 season in order to determine a format for competitive association football in the country. The competition was won by Al-Oroba, with the triumph recognised as official in 2001 by the UAEFA. The UAE Football League as it is known, includes the top flight UAE Arabian Gulf League with Al Ain the only club with fourteen title wins. UAE Division 1 currently acts as the UAE's 2nd tier competition with two clubs getting promoted and UAE Second Division League was established in 2019 to act as the UAE's 3rd tier competition.

UAE has seen a number of overseas players and coaches imported. Amongst the names to compete have been Paraguayan international Roberto Acuña, former Internazionale Mohamed Kallon and 2006 FIFA World Player of the Year Fabio Cannavaro. In 2011, David Trezeguet and Diego Maradona joined as player and coach respectively.

=== Cup ===
No fewer than six knockout cup competitions have been competed for in the UAE, although only three of these remain in existence. The Emir Cup, now called the UAE President's Cup began at the same time as the league and has been established as an annual contest since 1978–79. More recent additions to the calendar have been the Etisalat Emirates Cup and the UAE Super Cup, a one-off match between the league winners and the President's Cup winners. Some defunct competitions are the Federation Cup, an irregular competition, the UAE Vice Presidents Cup and the UAE FA Cup.

== International ==
The United Arab Emirates national football team, nicknamed Al Abyad, made their first appearance in 1972.

=== AFC Asian Cup ===
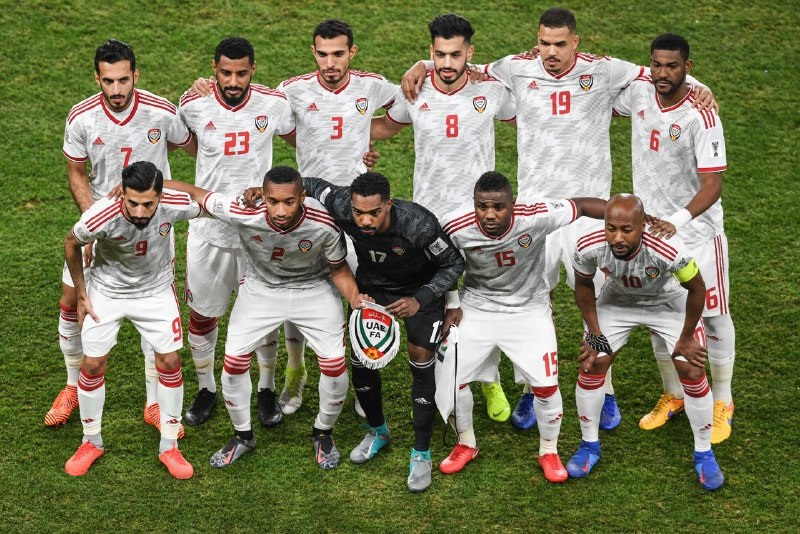
UAE national football team (2019)

Al Abyad first appeared at the AFC Asian Cup in 1980 when it was eliminated in the first round. Two more first round exits followed before the team finished fourth in 1992. In 1996, as hosts, UAE topped their group and then won games against Iraq and Kuwait to set up a final against Saudi Arabia. The match ended in a 0–0 draw but UAE lost on penalties.

The team qualified for three of the four subsequent tournaments and did not advance beyond in the first round in any of those appearances.

In 2015 they finished second in their group and advanced to the Knockout stage for the first time since 1996. They knocked out the defending Asian Cup champions Japan in the quarter-finals before losing in the semi-finals to Australia. They then beat Iraq in the Third Place match.

The UAE has hosted the Asian Cup for the second time in 2019. The UAE started the group stages by finishing first right above Thailand and Bahrain, they would beat Kyrgyzstan at extra time and knock out the defending Asian Cup champions, Australia, in the quarter-finals twice in a row and would lose in the semi-finals to Qatar making it the second time in a row the Emiratis would lose in the semi-finals. Some threw shoes and bottles at the Qatari team and some booed the Qatari national anthem.

=== World Cup ===
The UAE have qualified for the FIFA World Cup only once, appearing at the 1990 tournament. They were placed into Group D alongside leading European teams West Germany and Yugoslavia as well as South Americans Colombia. The team lost all three matches, 2–0 to Colombia, 5–1 to West Germany and 4–1 to Yugoslavia.

=== UAFA ===
UAE are also members of the Union of Arab Football Associations (UAFA) and take part in their competitions. This avenue of competition had provided the UAE with two international trophies, first being the 18th Arabian Gulf Cup which they hosted and won and the second being the 21st Arabian Gulf Cup which was held in Bahrain.

=== Other teams ===
Both the under-19s and the Under-17s have been champions, the former winning the AFC tournament in 2008 and the latter the Gulf tournament in 2009. A women's team also competes.

=== Club ===
The leading UAE club sides compete in the annual AFC Champions League. Al-Ain became the sole UAE team to win the competition in the 2002-03 season, defeating Thailand's BEC Tero Sasana 2–1 on aggregate in a two legged final. The club reached the final again in 2005 but lost to the Saudi club Al Ittihad. Ten years later in 2015, Al Ahli would become the second UAE club to reach the final only to lose 0–1 on aggregate to Guangzhou Evergrande, a year later Al Ain will reach the final for the third time in 2016 only to lose to Jeonbuk 2–3 on aggregate.

The GCC Champions League, a tournament for the leading Arab clubs from states on the Arabian Gulf, has been won by UAE clubs on eight occasions - Al Shabab in 1992, 2011 and 2015, Al Ain in 2001, Al Jazira in 2007 and Al Wasl in 2010, Baniyas in 2013 and Al Nasr in 2014.

== Overseas investment ==
In August 2008 the Abu Dhabi United Group purchased the English Premier League club Manchester City, installing Mansour bin Zayed Al Nahyan as owner and Khaldoon Al Mubarak as chairman. With the wealth of the ruling family of the Emirate of Abu Dhabi behind them the club became effectively the richest in the world.

== Attendances ==
The average attendance per top-flight football league season and the club with the highest average attendance:

Season	League average	Best club	Best club average
2010-11	3,265	Al-Jazira	15,922

== See also ==
- List of football stadiums in the United Arab Emirates
