= Roy Hodgson =

English football manager and player (born 1947)

Roy Hodgson CBE
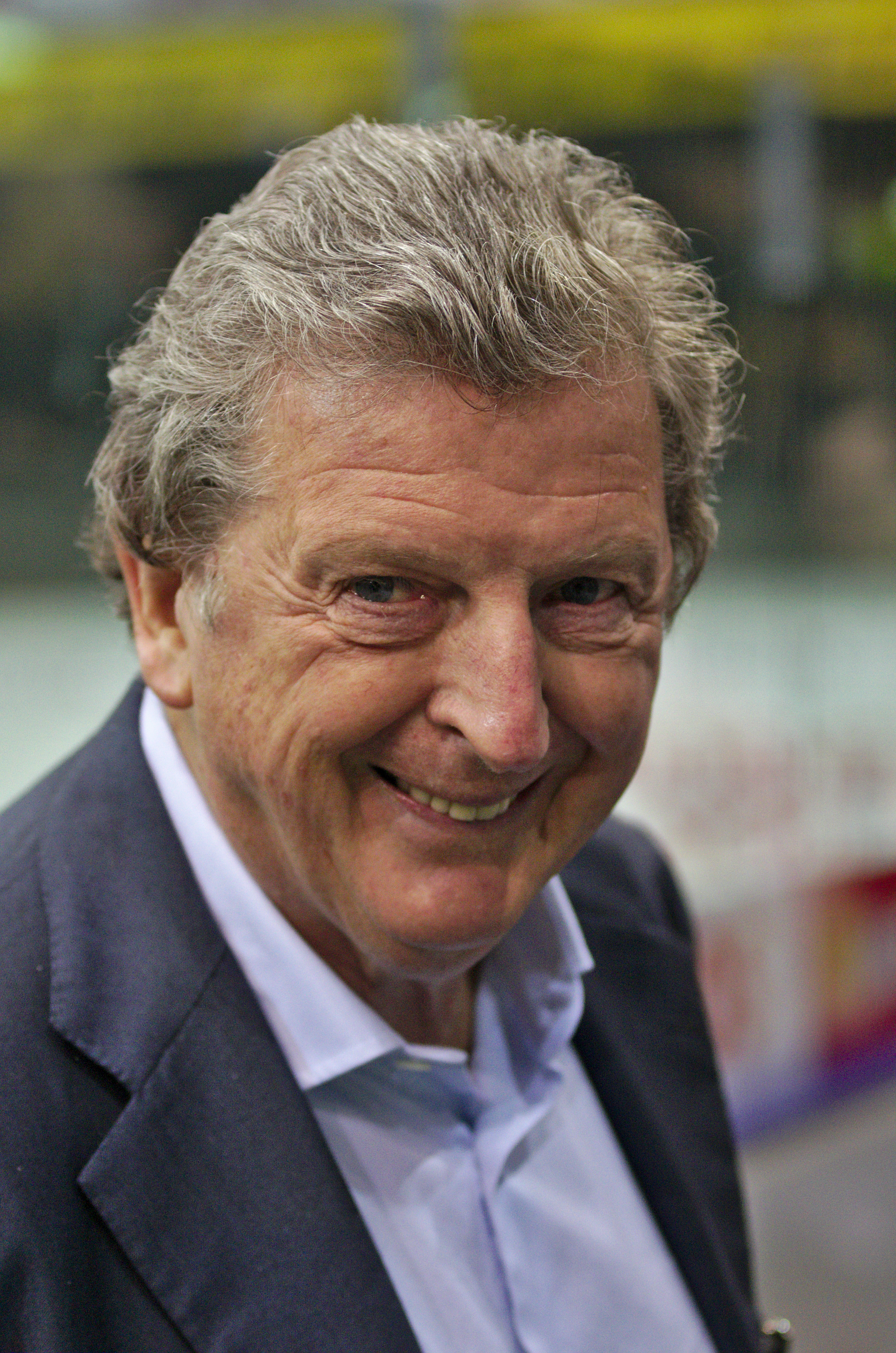
- Hodgson in 2014

Personal information
- Full name: Roy Hodgson
- Date of birth: 9 August 1947 (age 79)
- Place of birth: Croydon, England
- Height: 5 ft 10 in (1.78 m)
- Position: Left-back

Youth career
- 1963–1965: Crystal Palace

Senior career*
Years	Team	Apps	(Gls)
1965–1966	Crystal Palace	0	(0)
1966–1969	Tonbridge Angels		
1969–1971	Gravesend & Northfleet	59	(1)
1971–1972	Maidstone United		
1972–1973	Ashford Town		
1973–1974	Berea Park		
1974–1976	Carshalton Athletic		

Managerial career
- 1976–1980: Halmstad
- 1982: Bristol City
- 1982: Oddevold
- 1983–1984: Örebro
- 1985–1989: Malmö
- 1990–1992: Neuchâtel Xamax
- 1992–1995: Switzerland
- 1995–1997: Inter Milan
- 1997–1998: Blackburn Rovers
- 1999: Inter Milan (caretaker)
- 1999–2000: Grasshoppers
- 2000–2001: Copenhagen
- 2001: Udinese
- 2002–2004: United Arab Emirates
- 2004–2005: Viking
- 2006–2007: Finland
- 2007–2010: Fulham
- 2010–2011: Liverpool
- 2011–2012: West Bromwich Albion
- 2012–2016: England
- 2013: England U21 (caretaker)
- 2017–2021: Crystal Palace
- 2022: Watford
- 2023–2024: Crystal Palace
- 2026: Bristol City
- * Club domestic league appearances and goals

Roy Hodgson (born 9 August 1947) is an English former football manager and player who was most recently the manager of EFL Championship club Bristol City.

He has managed 22 different teams in eight countries, beginning in Sweden with Halmstad in 1976. He later guided the Switzerland national team to the last 16 of the 1994 World Cup and qualification for Euro 1996; Switzerland had not qualified for a major tournament since the 1960s. From 2006 to 2007, he managed the Finland national team, guiding them to their highest-ever FIFA ranking of 33rd place and coming close to qualifying for a major tournament for the first time in their history. He managed the England national team from May 2012 to June 2016. Other clubs that Hodgson has managed include Inter Milan, Blackburn Rovers, Malmö, Grasshoppers, Copenhagen, Udinese, Fulham, Liverpool, West Bromwich Albion, Watford, and boyhood club Crystal Palace, whom he managed for 200 games across two spells.

Hodgson is one of only five managers, alongside Ignacio Trelles, Luiz Felipe Scolari, Dick Advocaat and Giovanni Trapattoni, to have managed 1,000 or more club games and 100 or more national team games.

Hodgson served several times as a member of UEFA's technical study group at the European Championships and was also a member of the FIFA technical study group at the 2006 World Cup. Hodgson speaks five languages, (Note: He speaks his native English and fluent Swedish, German, Italian and French) and has worked as a television pundit in several of the countries in which he has coached.

== Early life ==
Hodgson was born in Croydon, Surrey. His mother was a baker in the town, and his father, Bill, a Newcastle United fan, worked as a bus driver south of the River Thames. Hodgson's family lived in the same building as Steve Kember, one of Hodgson's schoolmates at John Ruskin Grammar School. The two played in the school football team, a side which also included Lennie Lawrence. Bob Houghton, who would go on to play a prominent part in Hodgson's career, joined the school in the sixth form.

== Playing career ==
Hodgson was a moderately successful youth player with Crystal Palace, but was never able to break into the first team. After leaving Crystal Palace he played non-league football for several years with Tonbridge and Gravesend & Northfleet. At the age of 23, he completed training to gain his full coaching badge. He then joined Maidstone United, where he played and also served as assistant manager to Bob Houghton.

== Transition to coaching via teacher training ==
Hodgson completed a teacher training course in 1972 at Avery Hill College, part of what is now the University of Greenwich, where he was awarded a Certificate in Education with emphasis on physical education. Hodgson said of the experience: "When I went to the college it was mainly due to the obsession I had with football and I thought if they take me on and teach me to teach other people physical education, it will be the closest I might get to following my dream of working professionally in the game". He subsequently took a teaching job at Alleyn's School in Dulwich but left to briefly play football in South Africa.

In 1972, after a year at Maidstone, he moved to Ashford Town, while also working as a PE teacher at Alleyn's School in south London. The following year, he moved to Pretoria, South Africa to play for Berea Park, despite the sporting boycott of South Africa in effect at the time. In 1974, Hodgson returned to England for his final playing spell, joining Carshalton Athletic. Again, he supported himself by teaching, this time at Monks Hill Comprehensive.

== Managerial career ==
=== Halmstad ===
Hodgson started his managerial career in 1976 at Allsvenskan side Halmstad, having been recommended by then-Malmö manager Bob Houghton. Hodgson spent five years at Halmstad, winning the league championship in 1976 and 1979. His success with Halmstad in 1976 is considered one of the biggest surprises of all time in Swedish football. The year before, Halmstad struggled against relegation, surviving on just goal difference and before the 1976 campaign began they were almost universally tipped for relegation. Hodgson himself says that "my greatest achievement would have to be the water-into-wine job at Halmstad."

=== Bristol City ===
In 1980, Hodgson moved to Bristol City in his native England, where he was assistant manager to Bob Houghton from 1980 to 1982 and manager from January to April 1982. Due to the club's financial problems he was largely unsuccessful and was dismissed after four months in charge. Commenting later on his time at Bristol City, Hodgson said: "Bristol City was nothing short of a disaster in that we had only been there for a matter of weeks before the banks started to pull the rug from underneath the club. My job when I eventually took over, as caretaker manager, was quite simply to carry on in the aftermath of all the players leaving the club and just fulfilling the fixtures."

=== Oddevold, Örebro ===
In 1982, Hodgson moved back to Sweden to take over second-tier side Oddevold part-way through the 1982 season. Hodgson could not save the club from relegation as they finished eleventh, one point off safety. In 1983, he moved to fellow Division 2 side Örebro. In his first season, Örebro finished third. In his second season, the club finished first but the missed out on promotion to Allsvenskan after losing in the play-off to Mjällby.

=== Malmö ===
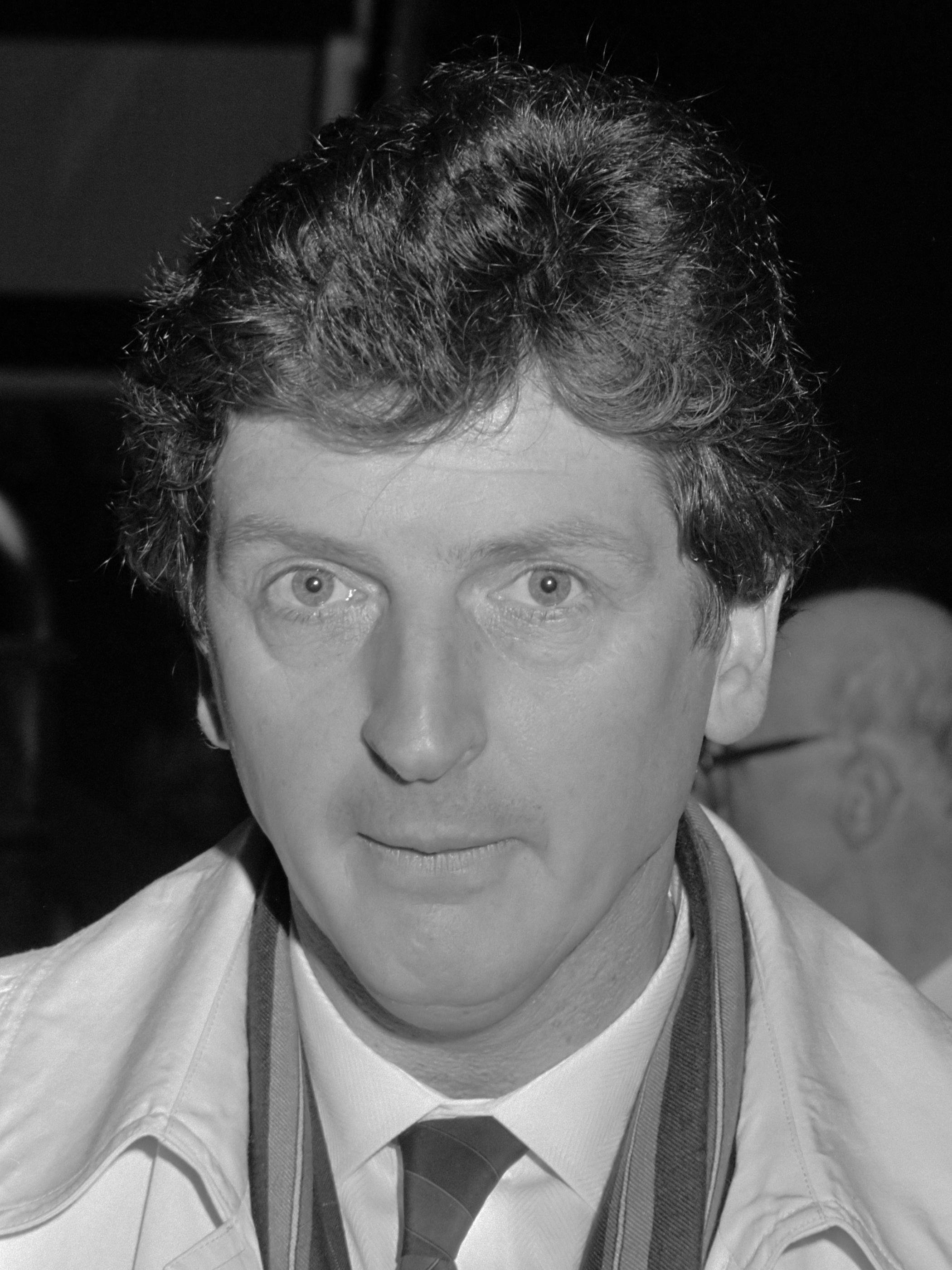
Hodgson in 1987

In 1985, he took over at Malmö, which he led to five consecutive league championships, two Swedish championships (at the time the Swedish championship was decided through play-offs) and two Swedish Cups. His team took part regularly in European competitions: the Intertoto Cup, the European Cup and the UEFA Cup. In the 1986–87 European Cup Winners' Cup, they defeated Apollon Limassol in the first round and Tirana in the second round, losing to Ajax in the quarter finals. In the 1987–88 European Cup, Malmö were eliminated in the first round by Anderlecht. In the 1988–89 UEFA Cup, Malmö defeated Torpedo Moscow in the first round after extra time and lost to the club Hodgson would manage seven years later, Inter Milan, in the second round. Narrowly losing 1–0 at home, they secured a 1–1 draw at the San Siro. Hodgson's greatest continental achievement at Malmö came the following year in the 1989–90 European Cup, knocking Inter out in the first round, winning 1–0 at home and drawing 1–1 at the San Siro. In the second round, Malmö lost to Mechelen. Due to his successful time at Malmö, Hodgson is still highly appreciated by the club's fans who have unofficially named a section of the Stadion "Roy's Hörna" (Roy's Corner). Hodgson continues to be held in high regard at Malmö, where he is known as "Royson".

=== Influence on Swedish football ===
His early coaching career was closely linked to that of his friend Bob Houghton; they worked together at Maidstone and Bristol City and they both worked in Swedish football at the same time. Houghton moved to Sweden with Malmö in 1974 and two years later installed Hodgson at Halmstad. The pair are credited with transforming football in Sweden and bringing in zonal marking for the first time to Swedish football. Swedish teams at the time were influenced by German football and used a sweeper with three or five in defence, favouring man-marking. The two were known in Sweden as English Roy and English Bob.

Besides zonal marking, the defence pressed hard and maintained a high offside line. Their teams counter-attacked with long passes played in behind the opposition's defence. Instead of playing with a team that was very spread out from one end of the field to the other, with a libero who stayed in his penalty area and a centre-forward who never tracked back, they set up a system of zonal defence, a back four, players pushing up and getting the ball forward into the final area much more quickly.

=== Neuchâtel Xamax ===
Malmö offered Hodgson a lifetime contract, but he declined, saying later that "moving to another place seemed exciting. The decision was also financial. Swedish taxes were so high that even if you were being paid reasonable money, after losing 65% in tax there wasn't a lot left." Hodgson moved to Swiss side Neuchâtel Xamax in July 1990. In his first season in charge, Xamax finished third in both the league and the subsequent championship play-off league, qualifying for the 1991–92 UEFA Cup. In the following season, Xamax finished fifth in the league and then finished second in the championship play-off league, missing out on the title to Sion by just two points. In Europe, he led Xamax to a 2–0 win on aggregate over Floriana and then a 5–2 aggregate win over Celtic. In the third round, Xamax were drawn against Real Madrid and they won their home tie 1–0 but were eliminated after a 4–0 defeat at the Bernabéu.

=== Switzerland ===
Hodgson took over as manager of the Switzerland national team from Uli Stielike on 26 January 1992. Stielike had been the first Swiss coach to have a winning record, winning 13 of the 25 games he was in charge of. As Hodgson was succeeding Stielike at the national level, Stielike took over the job Hodgson had just vacated at club level with Swiss Super League side Neuchâtel Xamax.

Switzerland had not qualified for a major international tournament since the 1966 World Cup. Hodgson took the Schweizer Nati to the 1994 World Cup, losing only one game during qualification, from a group that included Italy, Portugal and Scotland. The campaign, in which the Swiss came one point behind Italy, resulted in them rising to third in the FIFA World Rankings.

In the finals in the United States, the Swiss finished as runners-up in Group A alongside Romania, Colombia and the host team. They drew 1–1 with the Americans in their opening game in the Pontiac Silverdome; the first indoor World Cup game was played in extreme heat, and he admitted to not preparing for the conditions. The Swiss defeated a strong Romania team 4–1, qualifying for the Round of 16, where they lost 3–0 to Spain due to changing to an attacking formation after conceding an early goal.

The Swiss qualified for Euro 1996, again losing only one game during qualification to finish top of Group 3. With their place at Euro 1996 assured, Hodgson left immediately after qualification, on 15 November 1995, to join Italian club Inter Milan. He had in fact been doing both jobs from October of that year.

Part of Hodgson's success with the Swiss was to negotiate with the Swiss Super League for international players to train with him on Mondays and Tuesdays after playing for their clubs at the weekend, thus creating a club atmosphere in the national team.

=== Inter Milan ===
Before the European Championships, Hodgson joined Italian Serie A giants Inter Milan, where he worked from 1995 to 1997. With significant investment, he presided over a rebuilding phase. Inter had finished thirteenth and sixth in the seasons before his arrival. After a terrible start to the season that saw the team bottom of Serie A, Hodgson was brought in and guided the club to seventh place in the 1995–96 season, qualifying for the UEFA Cup. In an interview with FourFourTwo magazine from May 2005, Roberto Carlos stated that he had difficulties with Hodgson throughout the 1995–96 season, and that his decision to leave Inter at the end of the season was largely due to Hodgson's refusal to field him in his preferred position, as a left-back, rather than in a more advanced position on the wing.

The 1996–97 season Inter achieve a third-place finish in Serie A. Hodgson managed to get his Inter team, containing Javier Zanetti, Youri Djorkaeff and Paul Ince, through to the 1997 UEFA Cup Final, where they played Schalke 04. Given that Inter had a recent history of winning UEFA Cup finals, with victories in both 1991 and 1994, the Italian side started as favourites. It was the last UEFA Cup final to be played over two legs, with each club winning their home leg 1–0. When the German underdogs won the final in Milan on penalties, Inter fans pelted Hodgson with coins and lighters. The final was Hodgson's last match in charge of Inter and he subsequently left to become the manager of Blackburn Rovers. He was replaced by Luigi Simoni whose side finished second in the league in the 1997–98 season and reached the UEFA Cup Final again, winning 3-0 against Lazio.

In an interview in 2009, Hodgson recalled his time at Inter: "We lacked stars, apart from Paul Ince. It wasn't the Inter we see today of household names. They weren't the best technically but physically they were like machines. The Premier League is like that now, but back then Italy was far ahead." In the same 2009 interview, Hodgson recalled how club president Massimo Moratti tried to talk him out of leaving: "I could have stayed. They offered me a new contract, but I had a feeling that they wanted a change. So I allowed my contract at Inter to run out. Even after I agreed to join Blackburn, Moratti did say to me: 'I don't know why you didn't stay here, but if that's what you want to do I won't stand in your way.'"

Speaking about Hodgson's time at Inter, club president Massimo Moratti said: "Roy Hodgson was an important person in the development of Inter Milan to the point we have reached today. He saved us at the right time. When he came we were in trouble and things appeared dark. He didn't panic, he was calm and made us calm. Disaster was averted at the most important time. Everyone at Inter will remember him for that and his contribution. He is considered by us all as an important person in our history. He left an endowment to this club that's important in our history."

=== Blackburn Rovers ===
Hodgson was one of three targets for Blackburn Rovers owner Jack Walker when Ray Harford resigned as their manager in October 1996, along with Terry Venables and Sven-Göran Eriksson. The following February, with his Inter contract due to expire in July, Hodgson agreed to move upon its expiration to join Rovers for three years. As Eriksson had backed out of an agreement to move to the club, Hodgson signed a contract including a six-figure penalty if he did not join when freed by Inter.

In the 1997–98 season, his first season in charge, Blackburn finished sixth, qualifying for the UEFA Cup and appearing to be in the ascendancy, especially as they had been outsiders in the title race for more than half of the season and Hodgson had been voted Premier League Manager of the Month on two occasions, in August and December 1997. However, the team's form collapsed dramatically in the second half of the season and it was only on the last day of the season that they secured a UEFA place.

Hodgson's second season with Blackburn did not match the relative success of the first, due to numerous injuries, dressing room unrest, and the failure to find an adequate replacement for departed central defender Colin Hendry. As a result, Blackburn had a poor start to the season. After Berti Vogts resigned as manager of the Germany national team in September 1998, Hodgson was contacted by the German FA to succeed him. Hodgson declined. When England manager Glenn Hoddle faced calls for him to resign following a much-criticised serialised diary in a national newspaper and poor results in the opening games of Euro 2000 qualification, Hodgson was the favourite among the media and the bookmakers to take over. Ultimately, Hoddle stayed in the job and Hodgson was dismissed two months later on 21 November 1998, with Blackburn bottom of the league table.

Hodgson later explained that Blackburn's owner gave him the chance to resign honourably, but he refused to do so, leaving the club with no option but to dismiss him. His final game was a home defeat by Southampton. He later complained that his failure at Blackburn tarnished his reputation in England, whilst his record on the continent should have made him comparable to Sir Alex Ferguson.

=== Return to Inter, Grasshoppers ===
In February 1999, Glenn Hoddle was dismissed as England manager and Hodgson was considered an outside chance for the job. Ultimately, Kevin Keegan was appointed. Shortly after, Austria were defeated 9–0 by Spain in a Euro 2000 qualifier and manager Herbert Prohaska resigned. Hodgson was shortlisted to become the next manager, but the role went instead to Otto Barić. Hodgson then returned to Inter as technical director and had a brief second stint as caretaker, before returning to Switzerland to coach Grasshoppers for a season. He led the team to a fourth-placed finish in the 1999–2000 Nationalliga A in both the league and the subsequent championship play-off league. After Kevin Keegan resigned as manager of the England national football team in October 2000, Hodgson was one of three shortlisted candidates to take over; however, after having agreed to move to Copenhagen prior to the FA showing interest in interviewing him for the position, he was obliged to refuse any offer and the job went to Sven-Göran Eriksson.

=== Copenhagen, Udinese ===
Hodgson moved to Denmark in July 2000 and became manager of Copenhagen, where he proved an instant success, taking a team that had finished seventh and eighth in the two previous seasons to the Superliga championship in the 2000–01 season – the club's first championship since 1993. His team also won the 2001 Danish Supercup. In 2001, he left Copenhagen to move to Serie A side Udinese. With the club in ninth place and in the quarter finals of the 2001–02 Coppa Italia, Hodgson was fired in December 2001 after less than six months in charge after allegedly stating that he regretted taking up the post. Newspapers quoted him saying: "Obviously I'm very happy to be back at this level of football, but I could have chosen a better club to come back to. It's an extremely strange club." Hodgson denied making the comments, but later claimed that he wanted to leave so was happy to be dismissed. In January 2002, Hodgson was linked to the vacant managerial role at Shakhtar Donetsk.

=== United Arab Emirates ===
Hodgson took over as manager of the United Arab Emirates in April 2002, managing the senior and Olympic sides. Hodgson's reign began with six friendlies. The first two ended in defeat and the subsequent four were draws. Hodgson then successfully led the team through qualification to the 2004 Asian Cup as runners-up of their group. Before the Asian Cup took place, Hodgson led the team during the 16th Arabian Gulf Cup. He was dismissed in January 2004 after a fifth-placed finish in the round-robin tournament. Without him, the team went on to finish bottom of their group at the Asian Cup, collecting a single point.

Speaking later of his time as manager of the United Arab Emirates, Hodgson said: "That was a period where I didn't know where my career was going. But all these experiences enrich you and it was good to know I could get my message to players who many say are uncoachable. It's hard work; they're basically lazy. But I had them drilled and pressuring opponents almost like an English team. Most coaches who go there are just fannying around, but it's not my nature." In 2012, the president of the interim committee of the United Arab Emirates Football Association, Yousuf al-Serkal, said: "From what I remember of the period he was here, he didn't have a good opportunity of preparing his team for any tournament. There were no training camps and players were not made available to him. It must have been difficult for him to build the right atmosphere."

=== Viking ===
In July 2004, Hodgson moved to Norwegian club Viking, replacing manager Bjarne Berntsen, who resigned to become manager of the Norway women's national football team. The club had finished fifth in the season before Hodgson took over and finished ninth under Hodgson in their first season in their new stadium, Viking Stadion. They also qualified for the 2005–06 UEFA Cup through their UEFA Fair Play ranking. The following season, in the UEFA Cup, Viking progressed through two qualifying rounds, beating Rhyl and Austria Wien. In the group stage, Viking finished fourth, missing out on progressing to the knockout stage by just two points. The highlight of their campaign was a 1–0 victory over Monaco. In the 2005 Premier League, following a spell at the top of the table, Viking finished fifth, five points off top spot. Hodgson resigned in December 2005 to become manager of the Finland national football team.

=== Finland ===
Hodgson was to begin work with Finland in June 2006 but after resigning as manager of Viking in December 2005, he began the role early, in January 2006. Hodgson's first matches in charge were against Saudi Arabia and South Korea in a friendly tournament at the end of January. Finland played five more friendlies before qualification for UEFA Euro 2008 got under way, drawing three and losing two. Drawn in Group A, Finland, a country who had never qualified for a major tournament, narrowly failed to qualify. Their qualification campaign began well, winning three and drawing two of their opening five matches, leaving them briefly top of the table. Defeats to Azerbaijan and Serbia saw them fall from top spot. Wins against Belgium and Kazakhstan renewed their hopes of qualification but they drew their next three games 0–0. A subsequent friendly against Spain also finished 0–0. A win against Azerbaijan kept the chance of qualification possible and it was only when their final match against Portugal ended in a 0–0 draw that Finland were eliminated.

Although Hodgson's win ratio of just 27.3% was the worst of any Finland manager since 2000, this is attributable to his record in friendlies. Out of eight friendly matches, Finland drew five and lost three. All six of his wins came in official qualifying matches, allowing Finland to come fourth in their group with a respectable 24 points, finishing below third-placed Serbia on goal difference and missing out on qualification by just three points. Hodgson drew plaudits for his work with the team and Finland were praised for well-organised defending but criticised for inefficient attacking – five of Finland's 14 qualification games ended in 0–0 draws. In May 2007, when Lawrie Sanchez resigned as manager of the Northern Ireland national football team to manage Premier League side Fulham, Hodgson was considered for the role, but he committed himself to staying with Finland. Hodgson would go on to succeed Sanchez as manager of Fulham seven months later. Hodgson's contract expired at the end of November 2007 and although the Finnish FA expressed their willingness to extend it, he decided to move on. Prior to taking up an ambassadorial role at Inter, Hodgson was linked with the vacant Republic of Ireland manager's job. He was also considered an outside candidate to replace Steve McClaren as England manager, having been linked previously to the job after the departures of Glenn Hoddle and Kevin Keegan and given his international management record and nationality.

=== Fulham ===
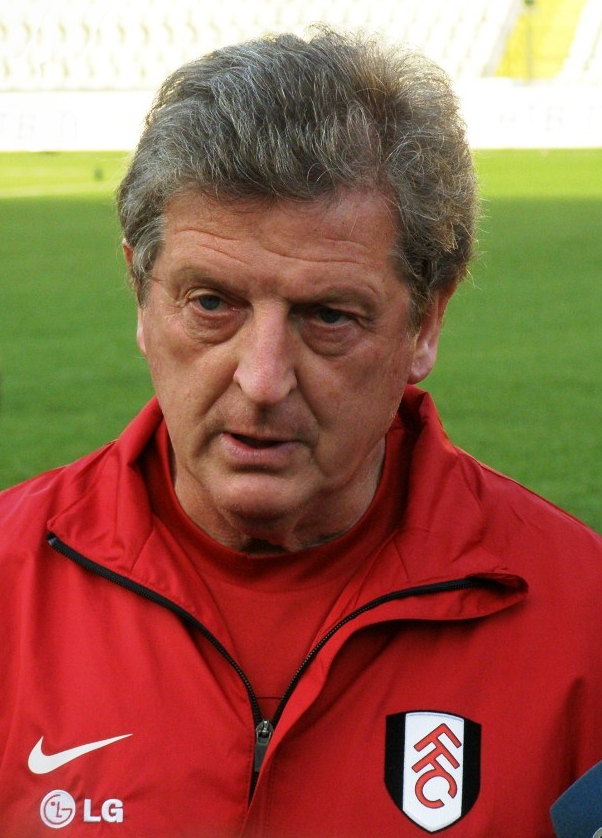
Hodgson as manager of Fulham in 2009

On 28 December 2007, in a surprise appointment, Hodgson accepted the post of manager at struggling Premier League team Fulham, with his contract beginning on 30 December 2007. The club were 18th, two points from safety and had only won two Premier League games all season. Hodgson's first game in charge was the West London derby against Chelsea at Craven Cottage which his club lost, 2–1. Hodgson made half a dozen signings in the January transfer window, the most important proving to be centre half Brede Hangeland, who would go on to become a key player for the club and who Hodgson had managed at Viking. Hodgson initially endured a run of very poor results with the club, including being knocked out of the FA Cup on penalties after two draws against League One side Bristol Rovers. Apparently certainties for relegation to the Championship, Fulham picked up just nine points from Hodgson's first thirteen league games. However, a run of 12 points from the last five games of the season, including a 3–2 win over Manchester City after being 2–0 down with 20 minutes remaining, secured the Cottagers' survival, which was confirmed on the final day of the season with a 1–0 win over Portsmouth.

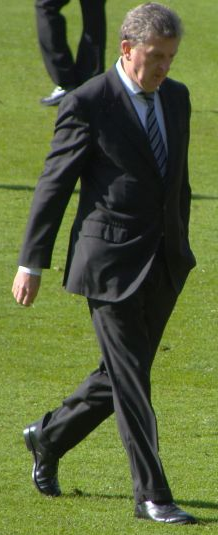
Hodgson in 2009

Ahead of the 2008–09 season, Hodgson made several important signings. Goalkeeper Mark Schwarzer and midfielder Zoltán Gera arrived on free transfers, as did teenage defender Chris Smalling, who would go on to be sold to Manchester United for £12 million. Other signings included striker Bobby Zamora and defender John Paintsil for a combined £6.3 million and striker Andy Johnson for £10.5 million. In the Premier League, Hodgson led Fulham to unprecedented success, guiding his side to seventh place in the Premier League, the club's highest ever finish and ensuring qualification for the new UEFA Europa League. Fulham also enjoyed a cup run, reaching the quarter finals of the FA Cup. The club received a number of additional awards from the Premier League, namely the Fair Play Award, the Behaviour of the Public Award and the Barclays Spirit Award for Hodgson. There were calls for Hodgson to be given the Premier League Manager of the Year award and he received much praise for the signings of Mark Schwarzer, Andy Johnson and Brede Hangeland and for the improvement in Bobby Zamora's performances. Hodgson's spell at Fulham greatly revived his reputation in England after his time in charge of Blackburn over a decade earlier, with renewed speculation linking him to the England job should Fabio Capello have left.

Players joining Fulham before the 2009–10 season included right back Stephen Kelly and midfielders Bjørn Helge Riise, Damien Duff and Jonathan Greening. Hodgson enjoyed a memorable run in the Europa League. The club's campaign, which started in July 2009 in the third qualifying round, featured impressive performances in the group stage, including defeating Basel at the hostile St. Jakob-Park in the final group game to qualify for the knockout stage at the expense of the Swiss club. In the following rounds, Fulham went on to eliminate holders Shakhtar Donetsk 3–2 on aggregate, Italian runners-up Juventus 5–4 on aggregate and German champions Wolfsburg 3–1 on aggregate. The victory against Juventus was especially memorable. Fulham lost 3–1 in Turin and went 4–1 down on aggregate in the second minute of the second leg at Craven Cottage. However, a goal from Bobby Zamora, a brace from Zoltán Gera and a late winner from Clint Dempsey meant that Fulham won the tie 5–4 on aggregate.

On 29 April 2010, Hodgson guided Fulham to their first major European final in their 130-year history, winning the home leg 2–1 after a 0–0 away draw to gain a 2–1 aggregate victory over Hamburg in the Europa League semi-final. In the final on 12 May at the HSH Nordbank Arena in Hamburg, Fulham played Spanish club Atlético Madrid. The game went to extra time at 1–1 after first-half goals from Diego Forlán and Simon Davies. With a penalty shoot-out looming and just four minutes remaining, Forlán scored again to win the game for Atlético Madrid. In the Premier League, the Europa League commitments showed as their League form became inconsistent. Fulham lost four of their first six games before losing only one of their following 12. Five successive defeats preceded a run of five unbeaten. Three straight defeats were then followed by three unbeaten before their final four games garnered one win and three defeats, meaning the club finished twelfth, just four points off ninth place. The club also enjoyed another good run in the FA Cup, again reaching the quarter-final before losing the replay to Tottenham Hotspur.

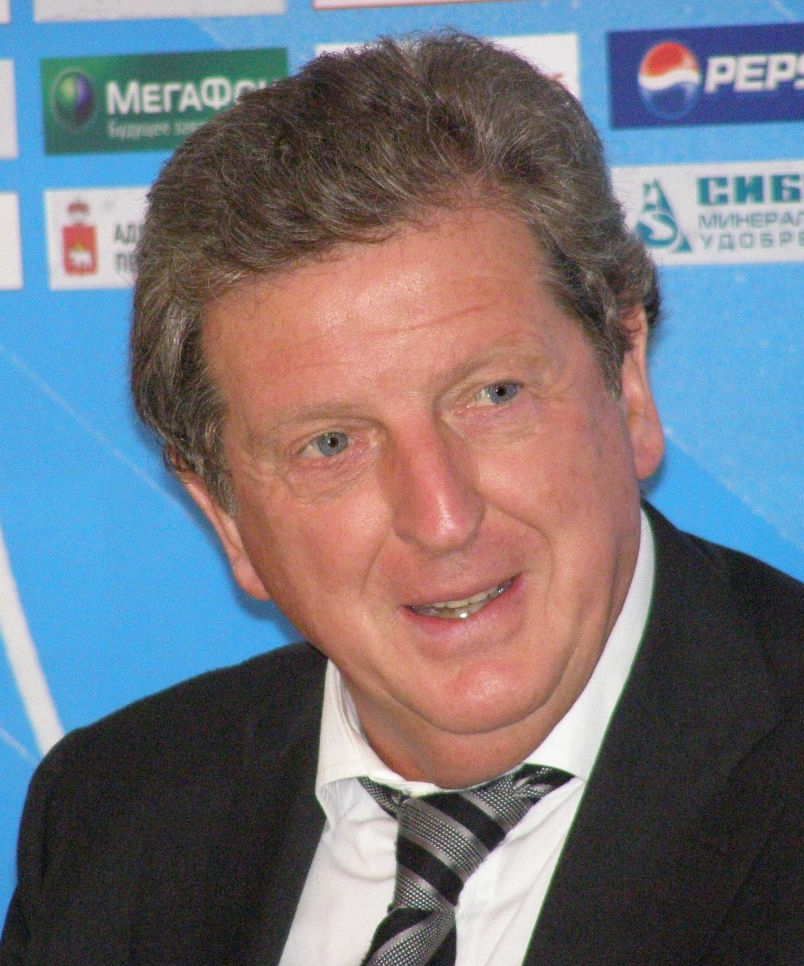
Hodgson in 2009

In May 2010, Hodgson was voted the 2010 LMA Manager of the Year by a record margin. Hodgson received the award after a poll of coaches, including managers from the top four leagues in England. Two days later, his Fulham side lost the club's first European final 2–1 to Atlético Madrid.

On 30 June 2010, the Liverpool Echo reported that Hodgson would be named as the new Liverpool manager after the club had agreed a £2 million compensation deal with Fulham. The announcement came after weeks of speculation following the departure of Rafael Benítez.

=== Liverpool ===
On 1 July 2010, Hodgson was appointed as manager of Liverpool, signing a three-year contract. The appointment came against the backdrop of an unexpected candidacy bid from former Liverpool striker and manager and then-club ambassador Kenny Dalglish. Dalglish's application was rejected by the club, who publicly never gave a reason for their decision, but it was suggested that he had been away from management for too long. Instead, Hodgson was chosen as the candidate that could use his extensive experience in management 'to steady the ship'. With the club up for sale at the time, Liverpool were likely to face some turbulent times, but Hodgson's appointment met with mixed reactions from fans. There were suggestions of insufficient experience with "big clubs", despite his tenure at Inter, and that he might struggle to manage high-profile players. Former Marseille and Juventus manager Didier Deschamps later said that he had been offered the job before Hodgson, but had turned it down.

Having signed Milan Jovanović and Joe Cole, Hodgson's first game as manager was a friendly against one of his former clubs, Grasshoppers, on 21 July, which ended as a goalless draw. On 29 July, his first competitive game in charge was a 2–0 away win against Rabotnički in the Europa League. In the return leg at Anfield, Liverpool again won 2–0, winning the tie 4–0 on aggregate. Hodgson's first league game with Liverpool was against Arsenal, being denied a debut win only after a last minute own goal by Pepe Reina resulted in a draw. Hodgson made further signings in goalkeeper Brad Jones, defenders Danny Wilson and Paul Konchesky, midfielders Christian Poulsen and Raul Meireles, as well as re-signing full-back Fábio Aurélio, who had been released by the club earlier in the summer. Meanwhile, Benitez signings Albert Riera, Diego Cavalieri and Javier Mascherano were all sold, whilst Alberto Aquilani was loaned out to Juventus and Emiliano Insúa was loaned out to Galatasaray.

On 29 August, Hodgson achieved his first league win, defeating West Bromwich Albion 1–0 at Anfield. After that, Liverpool had a series of poor results, one of which saw the club eliminated from the League Cup on 23 September by League Two strugglers Northampton Town at Anfield, losing on penalties. Prior to the home game against newly promoted Blackpool on 3 October, Hodgson responded to his critics, describing himself as "one of the most respected coaches in Europe" and said it was "insulting" to suggest he could not handle Liverpool's big-name players. Liverpool lost the game 2–1, leaving them third from bottom after seven games.

By late October, speculation was rife that Hodgson would be dismissed. Hodgson stated that he had no intention of resigning and responded aggressively to suggestions that Frank Rijkaard, who had recently been dismissed as manager of Galatasaray, would be appointed in his place. Three straight Premier League victories, including a 2–0 home win over league leaders Chelsea, reduced speculation as Liverpool returned to the top half of the table. New club owner John W. Henry stated his backing for Hodgson.

On 8 January 2011, Hodgson left the club by mutual consent, with Kenny Dalglish announced as his replacement.

=== West Bromwich Albion ===
Hodgson was appointed head coach of West Bromwich Albion on 11 February 2011, signing a contract until June 2012. Hodgson replaced Roberto Di Matteo, who had been dismissed after a poor run of form, which saw West Brom lose 13 of their previous 18 matches and slip to 17th in the table, only out of the relegation zone on goal difference.

Hodgson's first game in charge ended in a 1–1 home draw against West Brom's Black Country rivals Wolverhampton Wanderers. Hodgson helped West Brom to five wins and five draws from their twelve remaining games, including an important 2–1 win at The Hawthorns against Liverpool, a result that some in the media dubbed "Roy's Revenge". West Brom finished 11th in the final table, their highest league finish for three decades.

Despite having to deal with West Brom's notoriously frugal approach to the transfer market, Hodgson made several signings in the summer of 2011, replacing goalkeeping duo Boaz Myhill and Scott Carson with former Manchester United goalkeeper Ben Foster on loan from Birmingham City and drafting in Márton Fülöp from Ipswich Town on a free transfer. Experience and height was added to the backline in the form of Northern Ireland international Gareth McAuley on a free transfer and Billy Jones also arrived to add cover at fullback. Prior to the start of the season, former Hawthorns hero Zoltán Gera also returned on a free transfer from Fulham and a summer-long chase for Shane Long was finally ended with the Irish international signing for an undisclosed fee reported to be in the region of £4million. Long joined the club in time to make a scoring début in the season's opener.

Following good performances against Manchester United and Chelsea in their opening two fixtures, Hodgson's usual 4–4–2 formation was replaced with a 4–4–1–1 or a 4–3–3 formation.

Despite his side being continually beset with injuries to key players and the season-long loss of Zoltan Gera to a cruciate ligament injury in only his second start after returning, Hodgson's side always remained well above the relegation zone until the Christmas period when successive 2–1 home defeats to newly promoted duo Swansea City and Norwich City as well as to bottom club Wigan Athletic saw them move within three points of 18th-place Bolton Wanderers.

With Hodgson repeatedly stating his ambition for the season was to ensure a third season of Premier League football for West Brom for the first time in almost 30 years, he signed midfielder Keith Andrews and full back Liam Ridgewell in the January transfer window. In February 2012, Hodgson led West Brom to three consecutive wins, defeating local rivals Wolverhampton Wanderers 5–1 at Molineux and recording successive wins at The Hawthorns for the first time all season, defeating Sunderland 4–0 and Chelsea 1–0. West Brom's form in the final third of the season saw them win six, draw three and lose five from a difficult run-in involving games against seven of the top eight teams. In West Brom's final win of the season they defeated Liverpool again, this time at Anfield, their first win there since 1967.

On 29 April 2012, it was reported that Hodgson was approached by the FA for the vacant England manager job. He was appointed as England manager two days later but continued to manage West Brom until the end of the 2011–12 Premier League campaign, guiding the club to a 10th-placed finish, West Brom's highest top flight finish since 1981.

=== England ===
==== Appointment ====
After England manager Fabio Capello resigned, it had been widely reported in the British press that then-Tottenham Hotspur manager Harry Redknapp was favourite for the position. However, the FA chairman, David Bernstein, stated that, despite there being a shortlist of candidates, Hodgson was the only one approached. On 1 May 2012, the Football Association appointed him as the manager of England after agreeing a four-year contract. He officially assumed the position on 14 May.

==== Euro 2012 ====
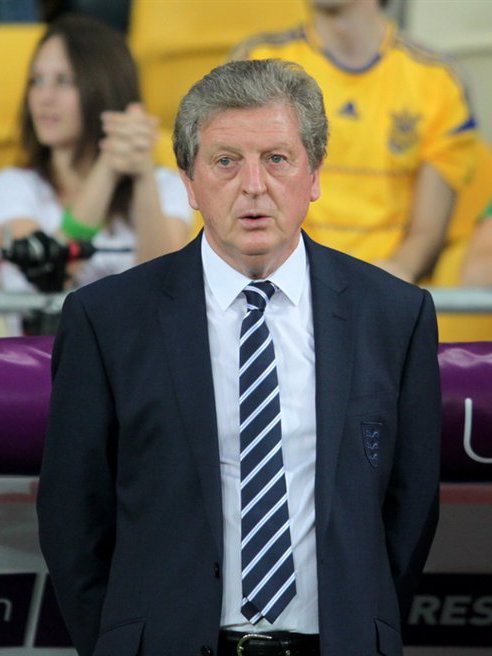
Hodgson managing England at Euro 2012

Leading up to Euro 2012, Hodgson engendered controversy when he left former England captain Rio Ferdinand out of England's initial Euro 2012 squad. Hodgson would defend his decision to leave out Ferdinand as due to "footballing reasons", citing Ferdinand's lack of appearances for the national team, his last cap having come in June 2011 and also concerns over his fitness. Ferdinand's manager Sir Alex Ferguson agreed with Hodgson, saying that at the Euros, "you play something like a game every four days. Rio Ferdinand couldn't do that". Speculation was rife that Ferdinand was not selected due to Hodgson not wanting both Ferdinand and John Terry in the same dressing room when Terry was due to undergo trial in July for allegedly racially abusing Ferdinand's brother, Anton. After injury ruled centre-back Gary Cahill out of the squad, Hodgson elected to pick Liverpool full-back Martin Kelly over Ferdinand, leading to Ferdinand's representative Jamie Moralee accusing Hodgson of disrespecting Ferdinand. Hodgson said about the decision: "When it came to bringing another player in, I wasn't going to bring in a player of Rio's age, class, background and experience to be a cover player. I had to be convinced, if I was going to take Rio in my 23, he'd be one of the first names on the team sheet. I couldn't be convinced that would be the case".

In Hodgson's first game, a friendly on 26 May in Oslo, England beat Norway 1–0, the first win by an England side against Norway for 32 years. Hodgson's second game in charge, and his first game at Wembley Stadium, was a 1–0 win over Belgium on 2 June. Although England did not enjoy the higher percentage of possession, the signs were they would be a tough defensive unit to beat. In the build-up to Euro 2012, Hodgson added Ray Lewington, Gary Neville and goalkeeping coach Dave Watson to his coaching team.

It was widely reported in the build-up to Euro 2012 that, with England's so-called "Golden Generation" at an end, a squad hit by injuries and with Hodgson having only a matter of weeks to prepare for the tournament, expectations for the national team, usually quite high, were considerably lower than usual. Hodgson's first competitive game as England manager ended in a 1–1 draw with France in England's first Euro 2012 group stage match. England faced Sweden in the second group game, which England won 3–2. Down 2–1, Hodgson replaced James Milner with Theo Walcott, with Walcott scoring the equalising goal and then assisting Danny Welbeck's winner, in England's first ever competitive victory over Sweden. In England's final group match, starting in second place behind France and needing only to avoid defeat to qualify, Wayne Rooney, returning from suspension, scored the only goal as England beat co-hosts Ukraine 1–0. Combined with Sweden's shock 2–0 victory over France, the result meant England qualified as group winners with France finishing second. Winning the group meant that England played the runners-up of Group C, Italy, thus avoiding reigning World and European champions Spain.

In the quarter finals, England drew 0–0 with Italy, before going out 4–2 on penalties. Although Italy dominated possession throughout the match, Hodgson's side were praised for being defensively well-organised and hard to beat, and the team were reported to have either met or exceeded their expectations.

Under Hodgson's management England rose to third in the FIFA World Rankings, their highest ever position since the rankings were introduced in 1992.

==== 2014 World Cup qualification ====
England were drawn in Group H of the European Zone of qualification for the 2014 FIFA World Cup, alongside Moldova, Montenegro, Poland, San Marino and Ukraine. They started the campaign on 7 September 2012 with a convincing 5–0 away win over Moldova, and in their second qualifier on 11 September the team drew 1–1 to Ukraine.

In a friendly at Wembley on 6 February 2013, England beat Brazil 2–1, their first win against the South American side for 23 years. England resumed World Cup qualifiers on 22 March when they thumped San Marino 8–0 at the Stadio Olimpico. The goals came from seven different scorers and included a brace for Jermain Defoe and a first England goal for Daniel Sturridge. The win was England's biggest since they beat Turkey 8–0 in October 1987.

In July 2013, the FA announced that Hodgson would take charge of the England under-21 side for one game, against the Scotland under-21s in a friendly on 13 August. England beat their rivals 6–0 at Bramall Lane.

On 15 October 2013, England beat Poland 2–0 at Wembley, with goals from Wayne Rooney and Steven Gerrard, to qualify unbeaten for the 2014 FIFA World Cup in Brazil. Hodgson said after the match that reaching the tournament was his proudest moment in football. After the Poland win, Hodgson was criticised by Kick It Out for a half-time speech to Chris Smalling and Andros Townsend, in which he made a joke about a monkey and an astronaut. Townsend did not find the joke offensive and was surprised by the criticism.

==== 2014 World Cup ====
On 12 May 2014, Hodgson announced his squad for the finals, stating: "I believe the squad can win the World Cup." The 23-man squad included Everton's Ross Barkley and Liverpool's Raheem Sterling, but not Ashley Cole, who announced his retirement from international football after missing out.

England lost to Italy 2–1 in their opening match of the World Cup on 14 June, and in their second match were beaten by Uruguay 2–1. Following Costa Rica's 1–0 defeat of Italy on 20 June, England were eliminated from the World Cup at the group stage for the first time since 1958. After the loss to Uruguay, Hodgson stated, "I don't have any intention to resign." England finished their World Cup campaign on 24 June with a goalless draw against Costa Rica to finish bottom of Group D.

==== Euro 2016 ====
Hodgson named Wayne Rooney as the new captain of England in August 2014, following the retirement of Steven Gerrard from international football. Hodgson's first match after the World Cup was a 1–0 win against Norway in an international friendly match at Wembley on 3 September 2014. During the match, England made only two shots on target. Hodgson was infuriated when asked about this, describing the statistic as "fucking bollocks". Former England player, Alan Shearer stated that he found the match dull, adding that "those who did go probably wish they hadn't."

Under Hodgson, England dropped to 20th in the FIFA World Rankings, their worst position since May 1996.

England started their Euro 2016 qualifying campaign with a 2–0 win against Switzerland, with Danny Welbeck scoring both goals. In March 2015, England won 4–0 against Lithuania, their fifth competitive win in a row to maintain their 100% record in qualifying for Euro 2016. On 5 September, England beat San Marino 6–0 away to qualify for Euro 2016. England concluded its qualification having won all 10 of its matches becoming only the fifth national side to qualify for a European Championship with a 100% record, and the sixth instance of all time. Prior to the tournament, Hodgson was praised in the media for introducing several promising young players, and for giving a more offensive playing style to the team.

In the Euro 2016 tournament in France, England progressed from the group stage as runners-up to Wales, after drawing 0–0 with Slovakia. On 27 June, after England were knocked out by Iceland in the round of 16, Hodgson resigned. Following the elimination, he endured media criticism for the team's negative performance, and for making several questionable selections and tactical decisions, such as the six changes made to the squad that had defeated Wales 2–1, which resulted in a 0–0 draw against Slovakia and a second-place finish in the group. He was also accused of failing to give the side sufficient preparation or an identity to their game.

=== Crystal Palace ===
On 12 September 2017, Hodgson was appointed manager of his boyhood club Crystal Palace, replacing Frank De Boer after signing a two-year contract with the South London club. He was tasked with managing a Palace side that had lost their first four league games of the season without scoring a single goal. Despite losing his first three games in charge, a turnaround in form meant he led Crystal Palace to safety and an eleventh-place finish in the league. No team had previously survived relegation from the top flight after losing their first seven games (itself a new Premier League record).

Crystal Palace finished the 2018–19 season on 49 points, equalling their best ever total in a single Premier League campaign. During it, in a match against Leicester City that Palace won 4–1, Hodgson beat Sir Bobby Robson's record as the oldest man to manage in the Premier League, at the age of 71 years and 198 days. In March 2020, he signed a contract extension, keeping him at the club until the end of the 2020–21 season.

On 18 May 2021, Hodgson announced that he would be leaving at the end of the season, having preserved Palace's place in the league. Asked about retirement, he said: "I really am stepping away from football for a while, but who knows what the future will be? It is a never-say-never moment. I've seen so many people retire with all the fanfare blazing, only to surface again somewhere in a fairly short period of time. I'd prefer not to do that."

=== Watford ===
On 25 January 2022, Hodgson returned to the Premier League when he was appointed as manager of Watford. He replaced Claudio Ranieri, who was dismissed the previous day with the club lying in 19th in the table, and signed a contract until the end of the 2021–22 season. In May 2022, Hodgson said that he would not be at the club after the end of the season and that he would not be seeking another managerial job in the Premier League. Watford were eventually relegated at the end of that season, finishing 19th with 23 points.

=== Return to Crystal Palace ===
On 21 March 2023, Hodgson returned to Crystal Palace as their manager until the end of the 2022–23 season, following the dismissal of his initial successor Patrick Vieira. His first game back in charge was a 2–1 win over Leicester City on 1 April, ending Palace's 13-match winless run with their first win of the calendar year. Hodgson went on to keep the club well away from relegation, winning five and drawing three of his 10 matches back in charge to ensure they finished in eleventh place. On 3 July 2023, Hodgson agreed to stay on as Crystal Palace's manager for the coming season, after signing a new one-year deal.

On 12 February 2024, Hodgson's 200th (and, as it turned out, final) game in charge of the club saw a 1–3 home defeat to London rivals Chelsea. This left Palace 15th in the Premier League table, five points above the relegation zone, having won six of their previous 24 matches and lost 10 of their past 16 Premier League games at that point in the 2023–24 season. On 15 February, amidst reports he was on the verge of being dismissed and replaced by Oliver Glasner, Hodgson was taken to hospital after being taken ill during a training session. The club confirmed on 19 February that Hodgson had stepped down as manager, and was replaced by Glasner.

=== Return to Bristol City ===
On 27 March 2026, Hodgson returned to Bristol City as their manager for the remainder of the 2025–26 season, replacing Gerhard Struber.

He recorded 3 wins, 2 draws and 2 defeats in his 7 games in charge to lift the club from 16th to 12th. Hodgson left the club by mutual consent following the end of the campaign.

== Personal life ==
Hodgson is married to Sheila, and together they have a son, Christopher. As of 2014, the couple resided in Chelsea, London.

Hodgson is multilingual: in addition to his native English, he speaks fluent Swedish, German, Italian and French. He enjoys reading and is known to be a fan of the authors Sebastian Faulks, John Updike, Philip Roth and Saul Bellow.

Although Hodgson played for Berea Park in South Africa's white-only National Football League during the 1970s, he has stated his admiration for Nelson Mandela and coached a World XI team in a charity football event in Mandela's honour in August 1999. Upon his appointment as the manager of England's national football team in May 2012, he was asked about his time during the apartheid era; he stated that he only played in South Africa for footballing reasons, as did his teammates at the club and not because of a political belief.

Hodgson was made a Knight, First Class, of the Order of the Lion of Finland in September 2012. He received an honorary doctorate from the University of York on 22 January 2016.

In 2018, Hodgson was made a Freeman of the Borough of Croydon. He was made a Commander of the Order of British Empire (CBE) in 2022, receiving his medal from Prince William, Duke of Cambridge, the president of the Football Association. He reflected: "I think when you are recognised by your country for services to the sport that you've loved and served, I think you've got to regard that as the ultimate accolade".

On 20 October 2013, Hodgson and Rio Ferdinand were appointed to The Football Association's commission to improve the state of the national game.

== Style of management ==
In a 2012 article for The Guardian, Jonathan Wilson described Hodgson's tactical set-up, containing game, and "prosaic" use of the 4–4–2 formation as "simple, unfussy and solid." He expressed the belief that it was the most suitable and effective set-up for England to use at Euro 2012, stating:

When out of possession, the back four stays perfectly in line, moving forward and back as though one unit, the midfield four (or five) rippling according to where the ball was, one advancing, the other three (or four) forming the blanket of cover behind, maintaining a gap of no more than 15 yards, often less, to the defensive line.

Wilson also noted that Hodgson, like his compatriot Bob Houghton, employed a zonal defence while coaching in the Allsvenskan, and that his teams pressed hard and maintained a high back-line, making use of the offside trap. They also utilised counter-attacks that were initiated with long passes played in behind the opposing defensive line. Swedish academic Tomas Peterson believed that the managers "threaded together a number of principles, which could be used in a series of combinations and compositions, and moulded them into an organic totality — an indivisible project about how to play football. Every moment of the match was theorised, and placed as an object-lesson for training-teaching, and was looked at in a totality."

In an article with The Blizzard, Hodgson noted that he and Houghton were attempting to introduce a different style of defending in Swedish football, rather than elements of English football, such as the long-ball game, stating: "Instead of playing with a team that was very spread out from one end of the field to the other, with a libero who stays in his penalty area and a centre-forward who never tracks back, we set up a system of zonal defence, a back four, people pushing up and, of course, getting the ball forward into the final area much more quickly." He also believed that Sven-Göran Eriksson's tactical innovations in the Swedish game were inspired by their own work.

== Managerial statistics ==
As of match played 2 May 2026

Managerial record by team and tenure
Team	From	To	Record					Ref.
Team	From	To	P	W	D	L	Win %	Ref.
Halmstad	1 January 1976	30 September 1980	130	52	45	33	40.00	
Bristol City	3 January 1982	30 April 1982	21	3	5	13	14.29	
Örebro	1 January 1983	30 June 1984	48	24	15	9	50.00	
Malmö	14 April 1985	15 November 1989	165	98	38	29	59.39	
Neuchâtel Xamax	1 July 1990	31 December 1991	67	26	24	17	38.81	
Switzerland	26 January 1992	15 November 1995	41	21	10	10	51.22	
Inter Milan	16 October 1995	19 May 1997	89	40	26	23	44.94	
Blackburn Rovers	1 June 1997	21 November 1998	63	22	18	23	34.92	
Inter Milan	27 April 1999	30 June 1999	6	2	0	4	33.33	
Grasshoppers	2 August 1999	30 June 2000	34	14	10	10	41.18	
Copenhagen	1 July 2000	30 June 2001	33	17	12	4	51.52	
Udinese	1 July 2001	10 December 2001	17	7	5	5	41.18	
United Arab Emirates	11 April 2002	30 April 2004	2	0	1	1	0.00	
Viking	11 July 2004	20 December 2005	50	23	11	16	46.00	
Finland	1 January 2006	29 November 2007	28	8	13	7	28.57	
Fulham	30 December 2007	1 July 2010	128	50	32	46	39.06	
Liverpool	1 July 2010	8 January 2011	31	13	9	9	41.94	
West Bromwich Albion	14 February 2011	14 May 2012	54	20	13	21	37.04	
England	14 May 2012	27 June 2016	56	33	15	8	58.93	
England U21	13 August 2013	13 August 2013	1	1	0	0	100.00	
Crystal Palace	12 September 2017	23 May 2021	162	54	38	70	33.33	
Watford	25 January 2022	22 May 2022	18	2	3	13	11.11	
Crystal Palace	21 March 2023	19 February 2024	38	12	10	16	31.58	
Bristol City	27 March 2026	2 May 2026	7	3	2	2	42.86	
Total			1,275	543	348	384	42.59	

== Honours ==
Hodgson was appointed Commander of the Order of the British Empire (CBE) in the 2021 Birthday Honours for services to football.

He received an honorary doctorate from the University of Greenwich in 2019.

I owe Avery Hill an enormous debt... they taught me certain principles which have stayed with me throughout my football coaching life... It was Avery Hill that endorsed the teaching principles required to become a good coach, because what is a good coach really other than someone who has got a pretty good grip of teaching principles?

=== Manager ===
Halmstad

- Allsvenskan: 1976, 1979

Örebro

- Division 2 Norra: 1984

Malmö

- Swedish Champion: 1986, 1988
- Allsvenskan: 1985, 1986, 1987, 1988, 1989
- Svenska Cupen: 1985–86, 1988–89

Neuchâtel Xamax

- Swiss Super Cup: 1990

Inter Milan

- UEFA Cup runner-up: 1996–97

Copenhagen

- Danish Superliga: 2000–01
- Danish Super Cup: 2001

Fulham

- UEFA Europa League runner-up: 2009–10

Individual

- LMA Manager of the Year: 2010
- Premier League Manager of the Month: August 1997, December 1997, October 2009, February 2010
- London Football Awards Manager of the Year: 2018
- LMA John Duncan Award: 2024

== See also ==
- National team managers with 100 or more matches
- List of football managers with the most matches
