= Zayed Sports City Stadium =

Multi-purpose stadium in Abu Dhabi, United Arab Emirates

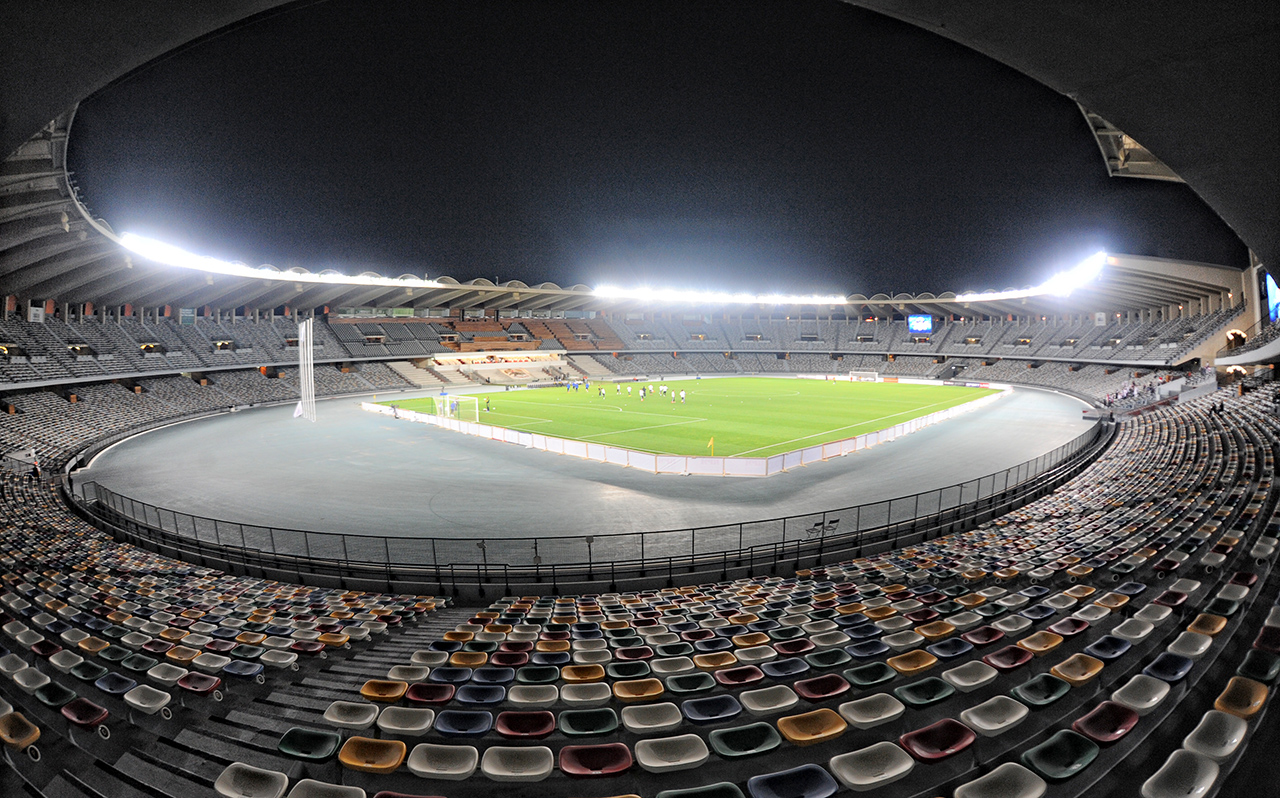
- Interior of the stadium
- Interactive map of Zayed Sports City Stadium
- Former names: Sheikh Zayed Stadium
- Location: Saif Ghobash Street, Zayed Sports City, Abu Dhabi, United Arab Emirates
- Coordinates: 24°24′58″N 54°27′13″E
- Owner: National Projects Office
- Operator: OVG Middle East
- Capacity: 44,260
- Executive suites: 6
- Surface: Grass
- Scoreboard: Daktronics (3)
- Record attendance: 50,790 (Coldplay's Music of the Spheres World Tour)

Construction
- Groundbreaking: 1974
- Opened: January 1980
- Renovated: 2009
- Expanded: 2017
- Cost: AED 550 Million
- Architects: Henri Colboc, Pierre Dalidet, George Philippe
- General contractor: Consolidated Contractors Company

Tenant
- UAE national football team (1980–present)

Website
- www.zsc.ae

Zayed Sports City Stadium (Arabic: ستاد مدينة زايد الرياضية) is a multi-purpose stadium located in Zayed Sports City, Abu Dhabi, United Arab Emirates.

The largest stadium in the UAE with 45,000 seats, it was featured on the AED 200 banknote.

The stadium was opened in 1979 and was renovated in 2009, with many of the facilities and amenities upgraded to ensure that it complies with international standards and can be used for a wide range of events.

The stadium hosted the 1996 AFC Asian Cup including the final, where the United Arab Emirates lost against Saudi Arabia in penalty shoot-outs. The stadium also hosted the 2003 FIFA World Youth Championship and the 18th Arabian Gulf Cup. The semifinals and finals of 2009 and 2010 FIFA Club World Cups were also held at the stadium. The stadium again hosted the Club World Cup in 2017 and 2018. It also held the 2019 AFC Asian Cup. It staged the opening and final matches.

== History ==
=== Development ===
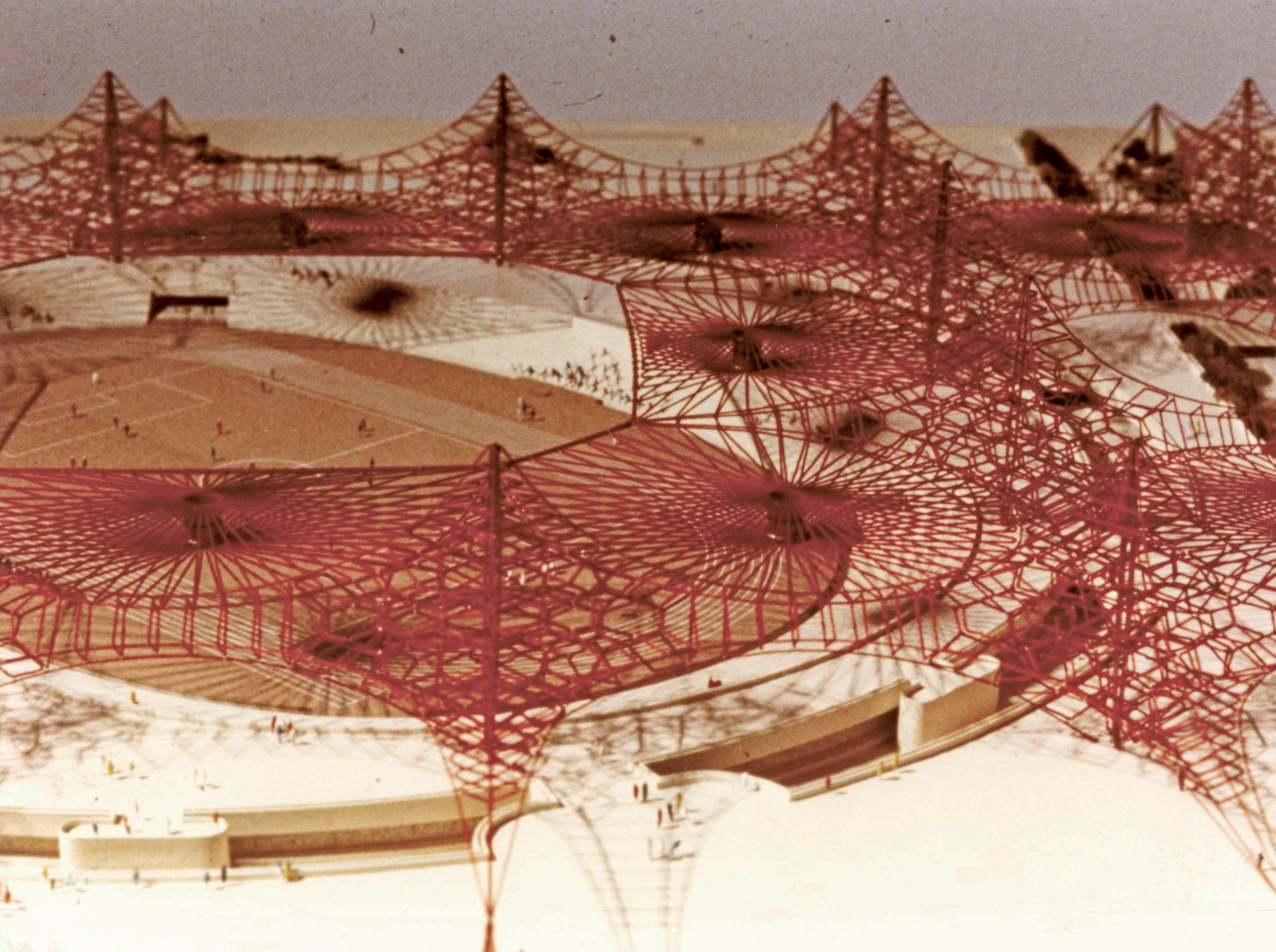
Model of a sports stadium in Abu Dhabi designed by Jörn-Peter Schmidt-Thomsen and Conrad Roland in the 1960s, which has never been realized.

Initiated by then-UAE President Sheikh Zayed bin Sultan Al Nahyan's desire, directions were issued to the Town Planning Department in 1974 to build a comprehensive sports complex of high international standards in Abu Dhabi.

Zayed Sports City Stadium was the crux of the first project phase, and a 60,000 seat stadium was constructed. This phase also included perimeter fencing, utility services and an internal road network. It was completed in 1979 and the stadium was inaugurated in January 1980. The total cost of this phase was AED 550 million. The stadium included full size grass pitch surrounded facilities to host athletics competitions. An electronic board and a sound system were installed as well as a modern electronic irrigation system. The building was designed to host international sporting events and provided media personnel with sufficient facilities to cover and broadcast tournaments via satellites.

The external design of the stadium features iconic arches which are showcased in the venue’s logo as well as on the AED 200 banknote.

=== Renovations ===
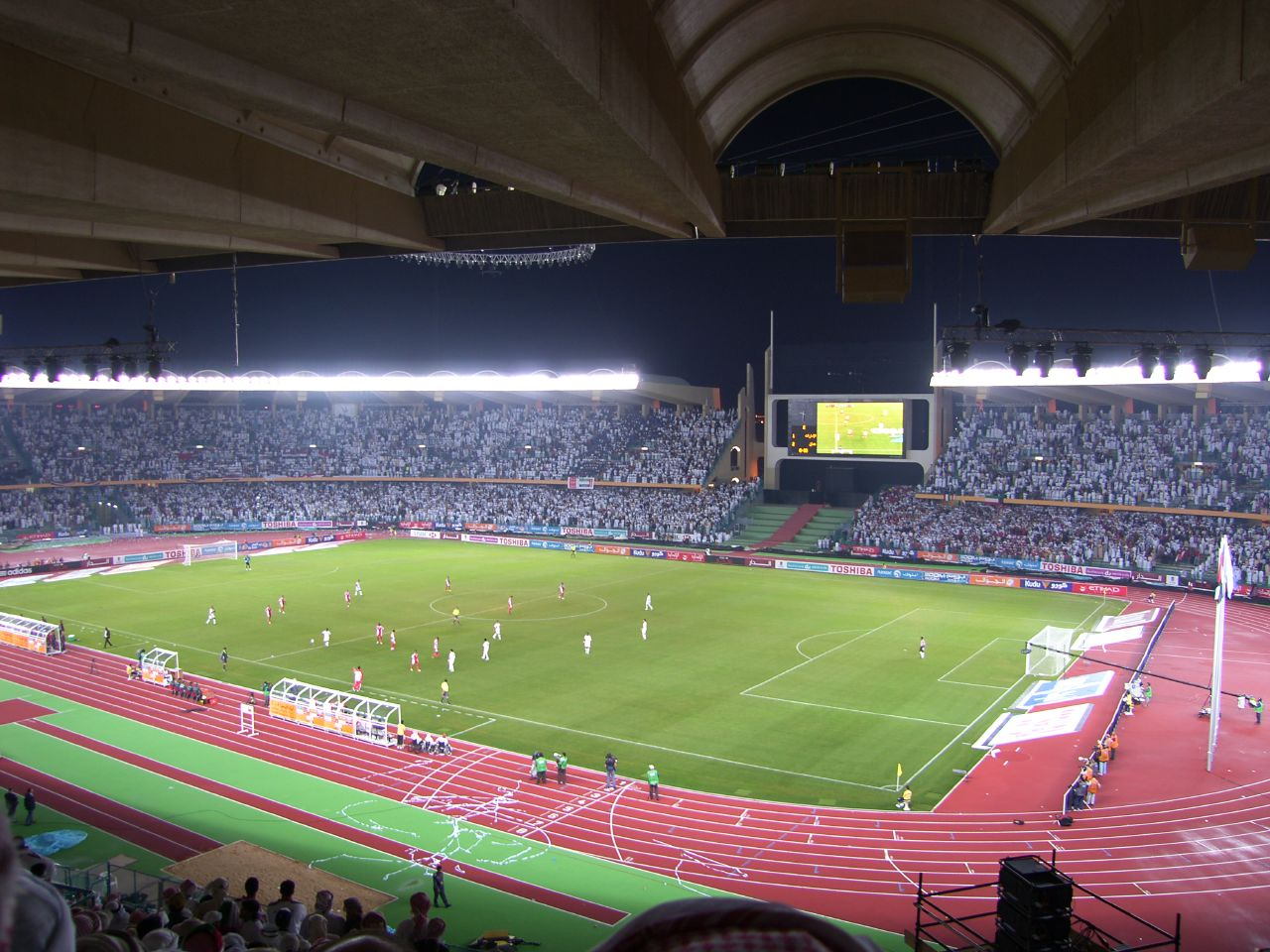
The stadium during 18th Arabian Gulf Cup in 2007

Throughout the years, the stadium has undergone significant renovations to ensure that it can accommodate the high-quality international events it was designed for. Hospitality areas, including the Royal Box interior and exterior, VIP seating and media seating were created throughout the years. Two scoreboards at either end zone were added in 2003. Renovations such as these have reduced the capacity to 43,791 public seats.

In preparation for the 2009 FIFA Club World Cup, architecture firm Populous led renovation works at the stadium, including brand new team locker rooms, wayfinding updates, refurbishments to the public facilities, updates to the Royal Box and installation of a new pitch lighting system. London-based company ISG was the construction contractor for the project.

=== Current features ===
The stadium is a traditional, open-air stadium that is defined on its exterior by iconic arches. Within the stadium is a full-size football pitch and a wide concrete apron surrounds it. There are 42,355 general entry seats on two levels plus 1,436 hospitality seats and 277 media seats. There is also a royal box with indoor and outdoor viewing areas and six media / hospitality sky boxes. On the concourses are concession kiosks, toilets and first aid facilities.

Back of house areas include space for media, hospitality, players, referees and storage. There are also several offices located in the stadium.

Three LED scoreboards are present in the venue as well as a sound system for spectators. The venue is fully lit to the standard required for HDTV broadcasts.

Surrounding the stadium is a pre-event plaza, then a series of fountains. Beyond this is the ring road, parking lots, training pitches and the rest of the Zayed Sports City facilities.

== 2019 AFC Asian Cup ==
Zayed Sports City Stadium hosted eight games of the 2019 AFC Asian Cup, including the opening match, and a Round of 16 and quarter-final match, as well as the final.

Date	Time	Team No. 1	Result	Team No. 2	Round	Attendance
5 January 2019	20:00	United Arab Emirates	1–1	Bahrain	Group A	33,878
8 January 2019	17:30	Iraq	3–2	Vietnam	Group D	4,779
10 January 2019	20:00	India	0–2	United Arab Emirates	Group A	43,206
13 January 2019	17:30	Oman	0–1	Japan	Group F	12,110
17 January 2019	20:00	Saudi Arabia	0–2	Qatar	Group E	16,067
21 January 2019	21:00	United Arab Emirates	3–2 (a.e.t.)	Kyrgyzstan	Round of 16	17,784
25 January 2019	17:00	South Korea	0–1	Qatar	Quarter-finals	13,791
1 February 2019	18:00	Japan	1–3	Qatar	Final	36,776

== Events ==
Zayed Sports City Stadium has hosted hundreds of events, large and small, in its history. Some of these have left a mark on the history of not only the stadium, but also on Abu Dhabi, the UAE and the GCC.

- 1980 – Friendship Football Tournament
- 1981 – Asian Youth Cup
- 1982 – 6th Arabian Gulf Cup
- 1983 – Saudi v Kuwait military football match
- 1984 – Olympic Football Qualification Matches
- 1984 – International Athletics Meet (included Italy National Team)
- 1985 – AFC Youth Championship
- 1986 – 2nd Asian Juniors Football Championship
- 1988 – Asian Cup Qualification matches
- 1989 – American Rodeo Festival (on the occasion of UAE 18th National Day)
- 1991 – Abu Dhabi Police Directorate Soccer Tournament
- 1994 – 12th Arabian Gulf Cup
- 1996 – AFC Asian Cup
- 1998 – Arab Knight Festival Closing Ceremonies
- 1999 – 14th FIQ World Bowling Championships Opening Ceremony
- 2003 – FIFA World Youth Championship
- 2007 – 18th Arabian Gulf Cup
- 2008 – George Michael and Alicia Keys concert
- 2009 – FIFA Club World Cup
- 2010 – FIFA Club World Cup
- 2011 – UAE 40th National Day Official Ceremony
- 2013 – Monster Jam
- 2014 – Nitro Circus Live
- 2017 – FIFA Club World Cup
- 2018 – FIFA Club World Cup
- 2019 – AFC Asian Cup
- 2019 – Special Olympics World Summer Games
- 2019 – UAE National Day Celebrations
- 2025 – Coldplay Music of the Spheres World Tour

== See also ==
- Abu Dhabi
- Football in the United Arab Emirates
- Sport in the United Arab Emirates
- List of football stadiums in the United Arab Emirates
- Lists of stadiums

Events and tenants
Preceded by Hiroshima Big Arch; Hiroshima	AFC Asian Cup; Final venue 1996	Succeeded by Camille Chamoun Sports City Stadium; Beirut
Preceded by José Amalfitani Stadium; Buenos Aires	FIFA World Youth Championship; Final venue 2003	Succeeded by Stadion Galgenwaard; Utrecht
Preceded by Khalifa International Stadium; Doha	Arabian Gulf Cup; Final venue 2007	Succeeded by Sultan Qaboos Sports Complex; Muscat
Preceded by International Stadium Yokohama; Yokohama	FIFA Club World Cup; Final venue 2009, 2010, 2017, 2018	Succeeded by International Stadium Yokohama; Yokohama
Preceded by Melbourne Rectangular Stadium; Melbourne	AFC Asian Cup; Opening venue 2019	Succeeded by Lusail Stadium; Lusail
Preceded by Stadium Australia; Sydney	AFC Asian Cup; Final venue 2019	Succeeded by Lusail Stadium; Lusail
