= List of indoor arenas in Qatar =

The following is a list of indoor arenas in Qatar with a capacity of at least 1,000 spectators. Most of the arenas in this list have organized multiple International and Continental individual sports, team sports events like the IHF World Men's Handball Championship, the World Athletics Indoor Championships, World Aquatics Championships and many Others. The indoor arenas also serve as a cultural events and Social events hub.

== Currently in use ==
N°	Image	Arenas	Capacity	City	Tenants
1		Aspire Dome	15,500	Al Rayyan	Aspire Academy
2		Lusail Sports Arena	15,300	Lusail	QOC
3		Ali Bin Hamad al-Attiyah Arena	7,700	Al Rayyan	Al Sadd SC
4		Duhail Handball Sports Hall	5,500	Doha	QOC
5		Al Gharafa Sports Club Hall	3,000	Al Gharrafa	Al-Gharafa SC
6		Al Rayyan Indoor Arena	2,000	Al Rayyan	Al-Rayyan SC

== Under construction ==
- Indoor Arena At Al Shaqab

== See also ==
- List of indoor arenas by capacity
- List of football stadiums in Qatar
