= Harry Phillips (footballer, born 1997) =

English footballer (born 1997)

Personal information
- Full name: Harry William Phillips
- Date of birth: 19 September 1997 (age 29)
- Place of birth: Basildon, England
- Height: 5 ft 10 in (1.79 m)
- Position: Midfielder

Team information
- Current team: Precision
- Number: 24

Youth career
- 2007–2018: Southend United

Senior career*
Years	Team	Apps	(Gls)
2018–2022	Southend United	12	(1)
2019	→ Billericay Town (loan)	0	(0)
2022–2024	Maldon & Tiptree		
2024	Cambridge City	4	(1)
2024–2025	Dubai City	21	(1)
2025–	Precision	1	(0)
- * Club domestic league appearances and goals as of 11:35, 23 October 2025 (UTC)

Harry William Phillips (born 19 September 1997) is an English professional footballer who plays as a midfielder for Precision.

== Career ==
In March 2014, Phillips made his under-18 debut for Southend United after initially joining the club in 2007.

On 9 November 2019, Phillips made his only appearance on loan for Billericay Town in a 4–0 FA Cup loss against Forest Green Rovers.

On 28 January 2020, Phillips made his debut for Southend, scoring in a 3–1 defeat against Doncaster Rovers.

Following release from Southend, Phillips later joined Maldon & Tiptree in December 2022. In August 2024, he joined Cambridge City. In October 2024, he joined UAE Second Division League side Dubai City. The following season, he was playing for fellow Dubai-based side Precision.

== Career statistics ==
As of match played 10 November 2020

Appearances and goals by club, season and competition
Club	Season	League			FA Cup		League Cup		Other		Total	
Club	Season	Division	Apps	Goals	Apps	Goals	Apps	Goals	Apps	Goals	Apps	Goals
Southend United	2019–20	League One	2	1	0	0	0	0	0	0	2	1
Southend United	2020–21	League Two	1	0	0	0	0	0	3 (Note: Appearance(s) in the EFL Trophy)	0	4	0
Southend United	2021–22	National League	9	0	1	0	—		0	0	10	0
Southend United	Southend United		12	1	1	0	1	0	3	0	16	1
Billericay Town (loan)	2019–20	National League South	0	0	1	0	—		0	0	1	0
Cambridge City	2024–25	Isthmian League North Division	4	1	1	0	—		0	0	5	1
Career total			16	2	3	0	0	0	3	0	22	2
