= List of indoor arenas in the United Arab Emirates =

The following is a list of indoor arenas in the United Arab Emirates with a capacity of at least 1,000 spectators. The indoor stadiums are sorted by capacity. Most of the arenas in this list have organized multiple International and continental individual sports, team sports events like National Basketball Association exhibition games, Ultimate Fighting Championship matches and many others. The indoor arenas also serve as a cultural events and social events hub.

== Currently in use ==
N°	Image	Arenas	Capacity	City	Tenants
1		Etihad Arena	18,000	Abu Dhabi	
2		Coca-Cola Arena	17,000	Dubai	
3		Hamdan Sports Complex	15,000	Dubai	
4		Al Jazira Sports Hall	4,000	Abu Dhabi	Al Jazira Club
5		Al Ain Sports Hall	3,000	Abu Dhabi	Al Ain FC
6		Al Wasl Sports Hall	2,500	Dubai	Al Wasl F.C.
7		Sharjah Sports Hall	1,000	Sharjah	Sharjah FC

== See also ==
- List of indoor arenas by capacity
- List of football stadiums in the United Arab Emirates
