= Yousuf al-Serkal =

Emirati football official

Yousuf Yaqoob al-Serkal (Arabic: يوسف يعقوب السركال) is a football official from the United Arab Emirates. He is a former vice-president of the Asian Football Confederation (2011–2015). He served as the Chairman of the United Arab Emirates Football Association for two terms, (2004 to 2008) and (2011 to 2016), then he became the president of UAE General Sports Authority in 2017.
