= Precision Football =

Precision FC
- Full name: Precision Football Club
- Founded: 2023; 3 years ago
- Ground: Precision Football, Ibn Battuta Mall
- Chairman: Sonny Cobbs
- Manager: Sonny Cobbs
- League: UAE Second Division League
- 2023–24: UAE Third Division League, 2nd (promoted)
- Website: www.precisionfootball.com
Home colours

Precision FC is an Emirati football club located in Dubai, that currently plays in the UAE Second Division League. The club plays at Precision Football, a venue founded by club chairman, Sonny Cobbs, too.

== History ==
Precision was established by in 2023 and is British-owned. In 2024 they aimed to win the UAE Second Division League signing a few ex international players.

== Players ==
=== Current squad ===
As of 2 May 2025

Note: Flags indicate national team as defined under FIFA eligibility rules; some limited exceptions apply. Players may hold more than one non-FIFA nationality.

| No. | Pos. | Nation | Player |
|---|---|---|---|
| 1 | GK | ENG | Max Johnstone |
| 3 | DF | SEN | Yakhoub Balde |
| 4 | MF | ENG | Callum Morris |
| 8 | MF | RSA | Kuhle Bekwayo |
| 9 | FW | ZAM | Nenai Banda |
| 11 | MF | ENG | Ben Pringle |
| 12 | DF | BFA | Bademin Loue |
| 13 | GK | AUS | Daniel Sadaka |
| 14 | FW | SEN | Modou Gadj |
| 15 | DF | ENG | Levi Woolley |
| 17 | MF | ENG | Aidan Finnegan |

| No. | Pos. | Nation | Player |
|---|---|---|---|
| 18 | DF | CMR | Joel Ondoua Boung |
| 20 | MF | CAN | Santiago Cruz |
| 21 | MF | ENG | Jamal Bartley |
| 22 | DF | ESP | Fernando Perez |
| 23 | MF | ENG | William Richards |
| 24 | MF | ENG | Harry Phillips |
| 27 | MF | BIH | Amel Muratović |
| 32 | GK | ESP | Óscar Medina |
| 45 | FW | SEN | Ousseynou Tall |
| 70 | DF | MAR | Hamza Bouzayd |

== Notable players ==
For all players with a Wikipedia article see Category:Precision Football players.

The footballers enlisted below have international caps for their respective countries. Players whose name is listed in bold represented their countries.

- (Cameroon) **Joel Ondoua Boung**
- (Republic of Ireland) **Harry Arter**
- (Jamaica) **Ravel Morrison**
- (Morocco) **Ismail H'Maidat**
- (Northern Ireland) **Jamie Ward**
- (Wales) **Joel Lynch**

== Personnel ==
=== Managerial history ===
| Dates | Name | Honours |
|---|---|---|
| 2023– | (England) Sonny Cobbs | |

=== Player records ===
Most Appearances = Joel Ondoua Boung
