= List of football stadiums by capacity =

List of football stadiums by capacity may refer to

- List of American football stadiums by capacity
- List of association football stadiums by capacity
- Australian rules football playing field
- List of cricket grounds by capacity - cricket grounds in Australia are commonly used for Australian football
