= Banaat FC =

Banaat
- Full name: Banaat Football Club
- Short name: BFC
- Founded: 28 August 2023; 3 years ago
- Owner: Budreya Faisal
- Head coach: Wafaa Nacha
- League: UAE Women's Football League
- 2025–26: UAE Women's Football League, 1st of 9 (champions)
- Website: banaatfc.com
Home colours	Away colours

Banaat Football Club (Arabic: بنات أف سي, lit. 'Girls FC') is an Emirati women's professional football club competing in the UAE Women's Football League. It was founded in 2023 by Emirati businesswoman Budreya Faisal to promote women's foootball participation in the United Arab Emirates.

Banaat won its first national league title in the 2025–26 season, before winning the inaugural 2026 UAE Women's Super Cup.

Banaat also became the first Dubai-based women's football club to compete in the AFC Women's Champions League, following their debut at the WAFF Women's Championship during the summer of 2026.

== History ==
=== Founding and early development (2023–2024) ===
Emirati businesswoman Budreya Faisal, the CEO and owner of sports marketing agency Ghost Concept, initially planned to create a "fake" and online football club as a demonstration for the role of marketing aimed at clubs in the Arab world. Faisal also considered taking over a third division men's club and developing it. However, she changed her plan to set up a women's club instead after encountering an Instagram account called "UAE Women's Football" and noticed that the majority of the teams in UAE Women's Football League were expatirate clubs.

Faisal asked Pakistan national team player Maria Khan for advice in setting up a team, which would eventually known as Banaat FC.Banaat was launched on 28 August 2023, the Emirati Women's Day. Exclusively a women's club, it was named after the Arabic word for "girls" (Arabic: بنات, romanized: banat). They aimed to be the first professional women's football club in Dubai. The team was hindered by a viewpoint that women's football is incompatible with Emirati society's conservatism.

=== Nike partnership and competitive growth (2024–2025) ===
Banaat started in the second division of the UAE Women's Football League in the 2023–24 season. They finished third and won a promotion to the first division. In 2024, they secured a sponsorship from Nike; the first independent women's club in the Middle East and North Africa region to do so. In just their second season, Banaat hosted their home games and training at Al-Nasr SC's facilities.

On 4 January 2025, Bacary Sagna was announced as the new head coach of Banaat FC. Banaat won their first ever title by finishing top of the 2025–26 UAE Women's Football League. Banaat also qualified for the 2026–27 AFC Women's Champions League, and were to enter the preliminary round of the Asian club tournament.

=== First league title and domestic success (2025–2026) ===
In June 2026, Banaat won their first ever title by finishing top of the 2025–26 UAE Women's Football League, completing an almost perfect campaign with just one loss. Banaat added more titles in their 2025–26 campaign by winning the 2026 UAE Women's Super Cup as the league champions, defeating Precision. Banaat were also finalists in the 2025–26 UAE Women's Cup.

=== International debut (2026) ===
Ahead of the 2026–27 season, former Morocco international Wafaa Nacha was announced the club's new head coach. Banaat FC's first continental participation took place at the 2026 WAFF Women's Clubs Championship in Jordan, where they topped a group consisting of Naft Al-Shamal SC and Beirut Football Academy, before reaching the semi-finals against Al-Hilal. In the same summer, Banaat FC became the first Dubai-based football club to compete at the 2026–27 AFC Women's Champions League, entering the preliminary round of the Asian club tournament where they finished second in the group stage facing Royal Thimphu College, Master FC and Nasaf.

== Club identity and culture ==
Banaat FC's mantra is “Rise. Represent. Reclaim.” rising to show the world that women are here to play, representing both women’s football and Emirati values, and reclaiming the strong regional position UAE women’s football once held after its inception in the mid-2000s. Banaat FC's home shirt color is traditionally lilac with black stripes, in tribute to Faisal's affection for AC Milan and their jerseys' traditional red and black stripes. The lilac, derived from the club's logo, was chosen as a gender-neutral and modern color. The club's away shirt tends to be a darker tone for away matches, referred to as the 'warrior' shirt to go to battle on the field of play.

== Academy and youth development ==
In Banaat FC's second season, the first youth team was launched with an under-17 team that participated in the second division of the UAE Women's Football League, finishing in 2nd place for the 2024–25 season. The Banaat FC Academy was then formally launched ahead of the 2025–26 season, offering teams exclusively to girls in several age groups ranging from 8 to 17 years old.

In the academy's debut season, both the under-11 and under-17 teams won their respective Summer Youth Football League (YFL) Division 1 league titles, while the under-15 and under-17 teams were both finalists in the Dubai Open for Football Academies (DOFA) competitions.

== Honours ==
Domestic Competitions

- UAE Women's Football League
  - Winners (1): 2025–26

Cups

- UAE Women's Super Cup
  - Winners (1): 2026
- UAE Women's Cup
  - Runners-up (1): 2025-26

Other

- Sports Industry Awards (SPIA) Sports Team of the Year (1): 2026

== Continental record ==
AFC Women's Champions League

- Preliminary Stage (1): 2026–27

WAFF Women's Championship

- Semi-Finals (1): 2026
