= United Arab Emirates Football Association =

UAE football governing body

AFC
- Short name: UAEFA
- Founded: 1971
- Headquarters: Abu Dhabi, United Arab Emirates
- FIFA affiliation: 1974
- AFC affiliation: 1974
- WAFF affiliation: 2001
- UAFA affiliation: 1974
- GFF affiliation: 2016
- President: Hamdan bin Mubarak Al Nahyan
- Vice-President: Abdullah Nasser Al Jneibi
- General Secretary: Mohammed Hazzam Al Dhaheri
- Website: www.uaefa.ae

The United Arab Emirates Football Association (UAE FA; Arabic: الاتحاد الإماراتي لكرة القدم) is the governing body of association football, beach soccer and futsal in the United Arab Emirates.

== Current association staff ==
Name	Position
(United Arab Emirates) Sheikh Hamdan AL NAHYAN	President
(United Arab Emirates) Abdullah AL JUNAIBI	Vice President • Commercial and Marketing Advisory Committee - Member
(United Arab Emirates) Obaid AL SHAMSI	Vice President
(United Arab Emirates) Mohammed AL DHAHERI	General Secretary • Youth Boys' Competitions Committee - Member
(United Arab Emirates) Hesham ALZAROONI	Treasurer
(United Arab Emirates) Salim AL NAQBI	Media And Communications Manager
(Belgium) Jan VAN WINCKEL	Technical Director
(Romania) Cosmin OLAROIU	National Coach Men
(Netherlands) Vera PAUW	National Coach Women
(United Arab Emirates) Salem Ali AL SHAMSI	Chairperson of the Referees Committee
(England) Lee PROBERT	Head/Director of the Referees Department
(Egypt) Mohamed ELASHMAWI	Referee Coordinator

== President ==
The following is a list of selected presidents of the United Arab Emirates Football Association including pre-UAEFA era.

President	Term
Mubarak Al Nahyan	1957–1961
Ghanem Ghabbash	1973–1974
Mana' Al Maktoum	1974–1976
Sultan Al Nahyan	1976–1981
Hamdan Al Nahyan	1984–1993
Abdullah Al Nahyan	1993–2001
Saeed Al Nahyan	2001–2002
Yousuf Al Serkal	2004–2008
Muhammed Al Rumaithi	2008–2011
Yousuf Al Serkal	2011–2016
Marwan Ghalaita	2016–2020
Rashid Al Nuaimi	2020–2023
Hamdan bin Mubarak	2023–

== Activity ==
At the level of developing the national cadres, the FA chose 2010 as the Year of the National Coach and signed various agreements with some national associations in the game for development and training including Germany, Spain, Czech, Italy and Egypt. The national coaches took over the youth and junior national teams and they were provided with financial support.

At the organizational level, the FA hosted the FIFA Club World Cups in 2009 and 2010, the 2009 FIFA Beach Soccer World Cup and other friendly and official championships and supported the women football and launched the Futsal in collaboration with sports council within the country. The next step is to organize and host the 2013 FIFA U-17 World Cup.

In 2010, UAEFA partnered with the Mubadala Development Company to launch the UAEFA Grassroots Festivals, a state-wide campaign to recruit and train certain players.

In July 2011, a 3-year sponsoring deal was signed with Panasonic. In January 2016, UAEFA signed a partnership with the United States Sports Academy to provide UAEFA a football club operators licensing program.

In December 2016, UAEFA renewed its partnership with the Japan Football Association.

In February 2017, UAEFA warned 46 football players (including Asamoah Gyan) about their inappropriate hairstyles that did not conform to its guidelines.

In October 2017, UAEFA requested that the 23rd Arabian Gulf Cup be postponed while the issue with Qatar was being resolved.

== Management ==
=== League system ===
Tier 1: UAE Pro League
Tier 2: UAE First Division League
Tier 3: UAE Second Division League
Tier 4: UAE Third Division League

=== Domestic Cups ===
- UAE President's Cup
- UAE League Cup
- UAE Super Cup

=== Defunct tournaments ===
- UAE Vice-presidents Cup
- UAE Federation Cup

=== Women's competition ===
- UAE Women's Football League

=== National teams ===
- United Arab Emirates national football team
- United Arab Emirates national under-23 football team
- United Arab Emirates national under-20 football team
- United Arab Emirates national under-17 football team
- United Arab Emirates women's national football team
- United Arab Emirates national futsal team
- United Arab Emirates national beach soccer team
- United Arab Emirates veterans' national football team

== See also ==
- UAE Pro League Committee
