= Abu Dhabi Country Club =

Association football club in the United Arab Emirates

- Full name: Abu Dhabi Country Club women's football team
- Nickname: ADCC
- Founded: 2004; 22 years ago
- Ground: Abu Dhabi Country Club football grounds
- League: UAE Women's Football League
- Website: adcountryclub.com

The Abu Dhabi Country Club (ADCC; Arabic: نادي أبو ظبي الرياضي) women's team is a professional football club based in Abu Dhabi, United Arab Emirates.

== History ==
The Abu Dhabi Country Club (ADCC) is a health and fitness club established in 1999. ADCC founded its women's football team in 2004.

The ADCC women's team is among the pioneer teams of the UAE Women's Football League which was established in 2012. The team has won every league title since the first season in 2012. ADCC took part in the inaugural 2024–25 AFC Women's Champions League where they reached the quarterfinals.

== Honours ==
- UAE Women's Football League
  - Champions (11): 2012–13, 2013–14, 2014–15, 2015–16, 2016–17, 2017–18, 2018–19, 2021–22, 2022–23, 2023–24, 2024–25
