= UAE Women's Football League =

Woman football league

- Founded: 2022; 4 years ago
- Country: United Arab Emirates
- Confederation: AFC
- Number of clubs: 10
- Level on pyramid: 1
- Relegation to: UAE Women's Second Division League
- International cup(s): AFC Women's Champions League; WAFF Women's Clubs Championship
- Current champions: Banaat FC (1st title) (2025–26)
- Most championships: Abu Dhabi Country Club (11 titles)
- Current: 2025–26 UAE Women's Football League

The UAE Women's Football League (Arabic: دوري الإمارات لكرة القدم للسيدات) is the top flight of women's association football in the United Arab Emirates.

== 2023–24 ==
The league was played in two stages, a preliminary stage to seed teams into two divisions where 10 teams contested where they will be seeded. Followed by a final stage of two divisions of five teams to contest the champions of the league.

The following ten teams have participated, competing in the top division and second division of the 2023–24 season:

First Division	Location	Ground	2023–24 Season finish
Abu Dhabi Country Club	Abu Dhabi	Armed Forces Stadium	1st
Banaat FC	Dubai	AlNasr Main Stadium 2	4th
Go Pro Sports Football Academy	Dubai	To be announced	5th
Mubadara Sports Academy	Al Ain	To be announced	3th
Precision Football Club	Dubai	Daqqa Stadium Ibn Battuta Mall	2nd

Second Division	Location	2023–24 Season finish
Athletic Football Club Dubai	Dubai	5th
Empire FC Dubai	Dubai	2nd
Leoni FC	Dubai	3rd
Peak Professional Experience	Dubai	4th
971 Women’s Football Club	Dubai	1st

Locations of the 2023–24 WSL teams

== Champions ==
=== By season ===
Season	Champion
2012–13	Abu Dhabi Country Club
2013–14	Abu Dhabi Country Club
2014–15	Abu Dhabi Country Club
2015–16	Abu Dhabi Country Club
2016–17	Abu Dhabi Country Club
2017–18	Abu Dhabi Country Club
2018–19	Abu Dhabi Country Club
2019–20	
2020–21	
2021–22	Abu Dhabi Country Club
2022–23	Abu Dhabi Country Club
2023–24	Abu Dhabi Country Club
2024–25	Abu Dhabi Country Club
2025–26	Banaat FC

=== By team ===
Club	Winners	Years won
Abu Dhabi Country Club	11	2012–13, 2013–14, 2014–15, 2015–16, 2016–17, 2017–18, 2018–19, 2021–22, 2022–23, 2023–24,2024–25
Banaat FC	1	2025–26
