= United Arab Emirates women's national football team results =

This article lists the results and fixtures for the United Arab Emirates women's national football team.

Win Draw Lose Postponed/Cancelled Fixtures

== 2010 ==
20 February 2010 2010 WAFF Cup	United Arab Emirates	4–2	Palestine	Abu Dhabi, United Arab Emirates
				Stadium: Zayed Bin Sultan Stadium

24 February 2010 2010 WAFF Cup	United Arab Emirates	7–0	Kuwait	Abu Dhabi, United Arab Emirates
				Stadium: Zayed Bin Sultan Stadium

26 February 2010 2010 WAFF Cup	United Arab Emirates	4–0	Bahrain	Abu Dhabi, United Arab Emirates
15:15				Stadium: Zayed Bin Sultan Stadium

28 February 2010 2010 WAFF Cup	United Arab Emirates	1–0	Jordan	Abu Dhabi, United Arab Emirates
15:15				Stadium: Zayed Bin Sultan Stadium

== 2011 ==
7 May 2011 Friendly	United Arab Emirates	4–0	Iraq	Abu Dhabi, United Arab Emirates
				Stadium: Zayed Bin Sultan Stadium

10 May 2011 Friendly	United Arab Emirates	6–0	Iraq	Abu Dhabi, United Arab Emirates
				Stadium: Zayed Bin Sultan Stadium

4 October 2011 2011 WAFF Cup	United Arab Emirates	6–0	Syria	Abu Dhabi, United Arab Emirates
15:15	Zerrouki 5', 60'; Marek 39', 45+1', 54', 87'	Report		Stadium: Zayed Bin Sultan Stadium

6 October 2011 2011 WAFF Cup	United Arab Emirates	1–4	Iran	Abu Dhabi, United Arab Emirates
14:30	Mamay 18'	Report	Rahimi 10', 79'; Ardallan 30' (pen.); Ghomi 90+4'	Stadium: Zayed Bin Sultan Stadium

8 October 2011 2011 WAFF Cup	United Arab Emirates	5–0	Lebanon	Abu Dhabi, United Arab Emirates
15:00	Hasanain 1'; Marek 16'; Zerrouki 44'; Trodi 58'; Nacha 64'	Report		Stadium: Zayed Bin Sultan Stadium

10 October 2011 2011 WAFF Cup	United Arab Emirates	4–0	Bahrain	Abu Dhabi, United Arab Emirates
20:30	Marek 14'; Nacha 49'; Zerrouki 64'; Trodi 75'			Stadium: Zayed Bin Sultan Stadium

12 October 2011 2011 WAFF Cup	United Arab Emirates	2–2 (6–5 p)	Iran	Abu Dhabi, United Arab Emirates
20:30	Maaouia 46'; Zerrouki 84'		Arzhangi 38'; Rahimi 53'	Stadium: Zayed Bin Sultan Stadium

== 2012 ==
28 October 2012 Friendly	Palestine	2–4	United Arab Emirates	Bethlehem, Palestine

== 2015 ==
12 March 2015 Aphrodite Cup	Latvia	2–0	United Arab Emirates	Abu Dhabi, United Arab Emirates
15:00				Stadium: Zayed Bin Sultan Stadium

13 March 2015 Aphrodite Cup	Greece	7–0	United Arab Emirates	Geroskipou, Cyprus
11:00				Stadium: Geroskipou Municipal Stadium

15 March 2015 Aphrodite Cup	Lebanon	0–3	United Arab Emirates	Peyia, Cyprus
11:00				Stadium: Peyia Municipal Stadium

18 March 2015 Aphrodite Cup	Azerbaijan	5–2	United Arab Emirates	Peyia, Cyprus
				Stadium: Peyia Municipal Stadium

5 August 2015 Friendly	Slovakia	9–0	United Arab Emirates	Senec, Slovakia

7 August 2015 Friendly	Slovakia	6–0	United Arab Emirates	Senec, Slovakia

== 2016 ==
24 February 2016 Friendly	United Arab Emirates	0–3	Georgia	Dubai, United Arab Emirates
				Stadium: Theyab Awana Stadium

27 February 2016 Friendly	United Arab Emirates	1–1	Georgia	Dubai, United Arab Emirates
	Nouf Faleh Al Anzi			Stadium: Theyab Awana Stadium

3 March 2016 Friendly	United Arab Emirates	2–1	Maldives	Dubai, United Arab Emirates
	Shahad Budebs; Shahad Budebs			Stadium: Theyab Awana Stadium

3 March 2016 Friendly	United Arab Emirates	1–0	Maldives	Dubai, United Arab Emirates
	Naeema Ghareeb			Stadium: Theyab Awana Stadium

17 May 2016 Friendly	Georgia	3–0	United Arab Emirates	Tbilisi, Georgia

20 May 2016 Friendly	Georgia	3–0	United Arab Emirates	Tbilisi, Georgia

26 June 2016 Friendly	Luxembourg	6–0	United Arab Emirates	Wormeldange, Luxembourg
				Stadium: Stade Am Ga

29 June 2016 Friendly	Luxembourg	5–2	United Arab Emirates	Wormeldange, Luxembourg
21:30			Jalila Al Nuaimi; Nouf Faleh Al Anzi	Stadium: Stade Am Ga

19 December 2016 Friendly	United Arab Emirates	0–1	Maldives	Dubai, United Arab Emirates
				Stadium: Theyab Awana Stadium

21 December 2016 Friendly	United Arab Emirates	1–0	Maldives	Dubai, United Arab Emirates
	Maryam Al Rumaithi			Stadium: Theyab Awana Stadium

== 2017 ==
4 January 2017 Friendly	Singapore	0–4	United Arab Emirates	Singapore
19:30			Naeema; Salha; Nouf; Salha	Stadium: Jalan Besar Stadium

6 January 2017 Friendly	Singapore	0–0	United Arab Emirates	Singapore
19:30				Stadium: Jalan Besar Stadium

2 March 2017 Friendly	United Arab Emirates	2–3	Azerbaijan	Dubai, United Arab Emirates
19:30	Afra Al Mheiri; Jalila Al Nuaimi		Aysun Aliyeva; Nigar Jalili; Sevinj Jafarzada	Stadium: Theyab Awana Stadium

5 March 2017 Friendly	United Arab Emirates	0–1	Azerbaijan	Dubai, United Arab Emirates
19:30				Stadium: Theyab Awana Stadium

9 March 2017 Friendly	United Arab Emirates	1–8	Uzbekistan	Dubai, United Arab Emirates
19:30 UTC+4				Stadium: Theyab Awana Stadium

12 March 2017 Friendly	United Arab Emirates	0–5	Uzbekistan	Dubai, United Arab Emirates
19:30 UTC+4				Stadium: Theyab Awana Stadium

3 April 2017 2018 AFC Asian Cup qualification Group A	Philippines	4–0	United Arab Emirates	Dushanbe, Tajikistan
19:00 UTC+5	Madarang 14', 45+1'; Navaja 49'; S. Castañeda 54'	Report		Stadium: Pamir Stadium; Attendance: 40; Referee: Mahsa Ghorbani (IR Iran)

5 April 2017 2018 AFC Asian Cup qualification Group A	Jordan	6–0	United Arab Emirates	Dushanbe, Tajikistan
19:00 UTC+5	Jbarah 3', 40', 77', 81'; Al-Naber 44', 80'	Report		Stadium: Pamir Stadium; Attendance: 40; Referee: Yoshimi Yamashita (Japan)

7 April 2017 2018 AFC Asian Cup qualification Group A	United Arab Emirates	1–1	Bahrain	Dushanbe, Tajikistan
13:00 UTC+5	Budebs 50'	Report	Abdulrahman 84'	Stadium: Pamir Stadium; Attendance: 30; Referee: Pansa Chaisanit (Thailand)

10 April 2017 2018 AFC Asian Cup qualification Group A	Iraq	0–3	United Arab Emirates	Dushanbe, Tajikistan
13:00 UTC+5		Report	Taheri 17'; Faleh 78'; Rashid 87'	Stadium: Pamir Stadium; Attendance: 30; Referee: Oh Hyeon-Jeong (Korea Republic)

12 April 2017 2018 AFC Asian Cup qualification Group A	United Arab Emirates	1–0	Tajikistan	Dushanbe, Tajikistan
11:00 UTC+5	Rashid 90+3'	Report		Stadium: Pamir Stadium; Attendance: 200; Referee: Rebecca Durcau (Australia)

23 November 2017 Friendly	Malta	4–0	United Arab Emirates	Ta'Qali, Malta
14:00 UTC+1	Theuma 13', 45+3' (pen.); Flask 44'; Giusti 71'	Report		Stadium: Centenary Stadium

26 November 2017 Friendly	Malta	4–0	United Arab Emirates	Ta'Qali, Malta
10:00 UTC+1	Zammit 3', 33'; Cuschieri 28'; Zahra 52'	Report		Stadium: Centenary Stadium

== 2018 ==
4 November 2018 2020 AFC Olympic Qualification Group B	United Arab Emirates	Withdrew	Hong Kong	Chonburi, Thailand
--:-- UTC+7		Report		Stadium: Institute of Physical Education Stadium

6 November 2018 2020 AFC Olympic Qualification Group B	Lebanon	Withdrew	United Arab Emirates	Chonburi, Thailand
--:-- UTC+7		Report		Stadium: Institute of Physical Education Stadium

11 November 2018 2020 AFC Olympic Qualification Group B	United Arab Emirates	Withdrew	Iran	Chonburi, Thailand
--:-- UTC+7		Report		Stadium: Institute of Physical Education Stadium

13 November 2018 2020 AFC Olympic Qualification Group B	Macau	Withdrew	United Arab Emirates	Chonburi, Thailand
--:-- UTC+7		Report		Stadium: Institute of Physical Education Stadium

21 November 2018 Friendly	United Arab Emirates	0–1	Kazakhstan	Dubai, United Arab Emirates
13:00 UTC+3		Report	Gaistenova 78'	Stadium: Theyab Awana Stadium

== 2019 ==
7 January 2019 2019 WAFF Championship	Jordan	4–1	United Arab Emirates	Muharraq, Bahrain
13:00 UTC+3	Al-Adwan 45' (o.g.); Hina 63', 74'; Al-Sufy 79'	Report (AFC)	Ibrahim 31'	Stadium: Al Muharraq Stadium; Referee: Mohamed Bunafoor (Bahrain)

9 January 2019 2019 WAFF Championship	Lebanon	2–0	United Arab Emirates	Muharraq, Bahrain
16:00 UTC+3	Mokdad 45+2'; Awad 86'	Report (AFC)		Stadium: Al Muharraq Stadium; Referee: Abdullah Al Kandari (Kuwait)

11 January 2019 2019 WAFF Championship	United Arab Emirates	0–0	Palestine	Muharraq, Bahrain
16:00 UTC+3		Report (AFC)		Stadium: Al Muharraq Stadium; Referee: Esra'a Al Mbaidin (Jordan)

13 January 2019 2019 WAFF Championship	United Arab Emirates	1–1	Bahrain	Muharraq, Bahrain
13:00 UTC+3	Aladwan 35'	Report (AFC)	AlIsa 19'	Stadium: Al Muharraq Stadium; Referee: Abdullah Al Kandari (Kuwait)

5 March 2019 Friendly	United Arab Emirates	2–0	Maldives	Dubai, United Arab Emirates
				Stadium: Theyab Awana Stadium; Referee: (United Arab Emirates)

8 March 2019 Friendly	United Arab Emirates	1–1	Maldives	Dubai, United Arab Emirates
				Stadium: Theyab Awana Stadium; Referee: (United Arab Emirates)

14 June 2019 Friendly	Georgia	5–1	United Arab Emirates	Tbilisi, Georgia
14:00 UTC+4	Bakradze 7'; Tchkonia 13', 47'; Chichinadze 64'; Salukvadze 90+1'	Report	Raukh 50' (o.g.)	Stadium: Davit Petriashvili Stadium; Referee: Irakli Kvirikashvili (Georgia)

17 June 2019 Friendly	Georgia	2–1	United Arab Emirates	Tbilisi, Georgia
14:00 UTC+4	Chichinadze 64', 67' (pen.)	Report	Al Zarkan 78'	Stadium: Davit Petriashvili Stadium; Referee: Giorgi Kruashvili (Georgia)

24 November 2019 Friendly	United Arab Emirates	0–0	Maldives	Dubai, United Arab Emirates
		Report		Stadium: Theyab Awana Stadium; Attendance: 200; Referee: Hamad Al Ali (United Arab Emirates)

== 2021 ==
22 August 2021 Friendly	United Arab Emirates	5–1	Maldives	Dubai, United Arab Emirates
	Al Hammadi 8'; Al Muhairi 16', 26'; Ibrahim 31'; Barnes 49'	Report	Ibrahim 82'	Stadium: Theyab Awana Stadium; Referee: Sultan Al Hammadi (United Arab Emirates)

25 August 2021 Friendly	United Arab Emirates	2–0	Maldives	Dubai, United Arab Emirates
	Al Muhairi 19'; Barnes 81'	Report		Stadium: Theyab Awana Stadium; Referee: Yahya Al Mulla (United Arab Emirates)

15 September 2021 Friendly	United Arab Emirates	4–1	Seychelles	Dubai, United Arab Emirates
	Al Muntaser 33'; Al Muhairi 37'; Jassim 80'; Khaled 90'	Report		Stadium: Theyab Awana Stadium; Referee: Ahmed Mohamed (United Arab Emirates)

18 September 2021 Friendly	United Arab Emirates	4–0	Seychelles	Dubai, United Arab Emirates
	Al Hammadi 14'; Al Adwan 52'; Al Bloushi 56'; Wael 88' (pen.)	Report		Stadium: Theyab Awana Stadium; Referee: Sultan Al Hammadi (United Arab Emirates)

2 October 2021 Friendly	United Arab Emirates	1–4	India	Dubai, United Arab Emirates
21:00 UTC+4	Khan 50'	Report	Manisha K. 20'; Xaxa 27'; Sweety 41'; Anju 75'	Stadium: Theyab Awana Stadium; Referee: Omar Al Ali (United Arab Emirates)

6 October 2021 Friendly	United Arab Emirates	0–4	Tunisia	Dubai, United Arab Emirates
21:00 UTC+4		Report	Troudi 8'; Abboud 51'; Houij 64'; Mamay 85'	Stadium: Theyab Awana Stadium; Referee: Sultan Al Hammadi (United Arab Emirates)

18 October 2021 2022 AFC Asian Cup qualification Group D	United Arab Emirates	2–1	Guam	Bishkek, Kyrgyzstan
17:00 UTC+6	Ibrahim 38'; N. Al-Adwan 81' (pen.)	Report (FIFA); Report (AFC)	Talledo 28'	Stadium: Dolen Omurzakov Stadium; Attendance: 0 Referee: Nodira Mirzoeva (Tajikistan)

21 October 2021 2022 AFC Asian Cup qualification Group D	Lebanon	1–0	United Arab Emirates	Bishkek, Kyrgyzstan
12:00 UTC+6	Salha 48'	Report (FIFA); Report (AFC)		Stadium: Dolen Omurzakov Stadium; Attendance: 0 Referee: Park Se-jin (Korea Republic)

24 October 2021 2022 AFC Asian Cup qualification Group D	Myanmar	2–0	United Arab Emirates	Bishkek, Kyrgyzstan
12:00 UTC+6	Khin Mo Mo Tun 5'; Chit Chit 23'	Report (AFC)		Stadium: Dolen Omurzakov Stadium; Referee: Veronika Bernatskaia (Kyrgyz Republic)

== 2022 ==
20 February 2022 Friendly	Azerbaijan	4–0	United Arab Emirates	Baku, Azerbaijan
	Bozdağ 50', 61'; Seyfatdinova 80'; Bakarandze 90+4' (pen.)	Report		Stadium: Dalga Arena; Referee: Emin Əliyev (Azerbaijan)

23 February 2022 Friendly	Azerbaijan	2–0	United Arab Emirates	Baku, Azerbaijan
	Jafarzade 60'; Mollayeva 78'	Report		Stadium: Dalga Arena; Referee: Fəridə Lütfəliyeva (Azerbaijan)

17 August 2022 Friendly	United Arab Emirates	1–4	Syria	Dubai, UAE
19:30 UTC+4	Ghiyath 38'	Report	Noureddin 29' (pen.); Hammou 32', 45'; Al Halabi 88'	Stadium: Theyab Awana Stadium; Referee: Khuloud Al Zaabi (United Arab Emirates)

19 August 2022 Friendly	United Arab Emirates	2–0	Syria	Dubai, UAE
--:-- UTC+4		Report		Stadium: Theyab Awana Stadium

21 August 2022 Friendly	United Arab Emirates	0–1	Syria	Dubai, UAE
19:25 UTC+4		Report	Aizouq 70'	Stadium: Theyab Awana Stadium; Referee: Khalid Al Shaqsi (Oman)

== 2025 ==
26 February 2025 Friendly	United Arab Emirates	3–1	Bangladesh	Dubai, United Arab Emirates
21:30 BST (UTC+6)	Forshaw 18'; Gibson 28', 73'	Report	Khandaker 35' (pen.)	Stadium: Theyab Awana Stadium; Referee: Alissar Baddour (Syria)

2 March 2025 Friendly	United Arab Emirates	3–1	Bangladesh	Dubai, United Arab Emirates
21:30 BST (UTC+6)	Al-Anzi 32'; Lindborg 40'; Gibson 58'	Report	Khandaker 80' (pen.)	Stadium: Theyab Awana Stadium; Referee: Alissar Baddour (Syria)

April 4 Friendly	United Arab Emirates	1–4	Philippines	Dubai, United Arab Emirates
19:30 UTC+4	Juma 89'	Report	Long 8'; C. McDaniel 19', 33'; Serrano 31'	Stadium: Theyab Awana Stadium

April 8 Friendly	United Arab Emirates	0–4	Philippines	Dubai, United Arab Emirates
19:30 UTC+4		Report	Eggesvik 37'; Frilles 54'; Long 62'; C. McDaniel 74'	Stadium: Theyab Awana Stadium

29 May Friendly	United Arab Emirates	0–0	Bahrain	Al-Khawaneej, United Arab Emirates
19:45 UTC+4		Report		Stadium: UAEFA Stadium; Referee: Shahenda El-Maghrabi (Egypt)

2 June Friendly	United Arab Emirates	2–2	Bahrain	Al-Khawaneej, United Arab Emirates
19:45 UTC+4	Lindborg 63'; Bhandari 69'	Report	Al-Mannaei 44'; Al-Isa 66'	Stadium: UAEFA Stadium; Referee: Shahenda El-Maghrabi (Egypt)

18 June Friendly	United Arab Emirates	1–3	Malaysia	Al-Khawaneej, United Arab Emirates
19:45 UTC+4	Al-Zahmi	Report	Nurfazira S.; Intan Sarah Z.; Nur Adrienna Z.	Stadium: UAE FA Stadium; Referee: Noura El Sayed (Egypt)

21 June Friendly	United Arab Emirates	0–2	Malaysia	Al-Khawaneej, United Arab Emirates
19:45 UTC+4		Report		Stadium: UAEFA Stadium; Referee: Noura El Sayed (Egypt)

29 June 2026 AFC Asian Cup qualification	Guam	0–0	United Arab Emirates	Việt Trì, Vietnam
16:00 UTC+7		Report		Stadium: Việt Trì Stadium; Referee: Pansa Chaisanit (Thailand)

2 July 2026 AFC Asian Cup qualification	United Arab Emirates	0–6	Vietnam	Việt Trì, Vietnam
19:00 UTC+7		Report	Chương Thị Kiều 11'; Thái Thị Thảo 14'; Nguyễn Thị Vạn 43', 51'; Phạm Hải Yến 64'; Ngân Thị Vạn Sự 90+4'	Stadium: Việt Trì Stadium; Referee: Dong Fangyu (China)

5 July 2026 AFC Asian Cup qualification	United Arab Emirates	5–0	Maldives	Việt Trì, Vietnam
16:00 UTC+7	Al-Zaabi 28', 45+4', 47'; Al-Hosani 68'; Al-Hazmi 90+1'	Report		Stadium: Việt Trì Stadium; Referee: Anjana Rai (Nepal)

26 November 2025 WAFF Championship GS	United Arab Emirates	0–3	Iraq	Jeddah, Saudi Arabia
16:45 UTC+3		Report	Omar 20'; Al-Jawahiri 47'; Salihi 90+5'	Stadium: Hall Stadium – King Abdullah Sports City; Referee: Yasmin Nairoukh (Palestine)

28 November 2025 WAFF Championship GS	Saudi Arabia	5–0	United Arab Emirates	Jeddah, Saudi Arabia
19:45 UTC+3	Abdullah 3', 10'; Abdulrazak 26'; Khalid 28'; Abu Al-Samh 43'	Report		Stadium: Hall Stadium – King Abdullah Sports City; Referee: Mohammed Al-Manii (Oman)

== 2026 ==
5 March 2026 Friendly	United Arab Emirates	0–0	Tajikistan	Dubai, United Arab Emirates
20:00 UTC+4		Report; Report (FFT)	S. Saidova (penalty missed) 83'	Stadium: UAE Football Association Stadium

== See also ==
- United Arab Emirates women's national football team
- List of United Arab Emirates women's international footballers
- United Arab Emirates women's national under-20 football team
- United Arab Emirates women's national under-17 football team
