= Bahrain women's national football team results =

This article lists the results and fixtures for the Bahrain women's national football team. The national team's first activity was in 2005, when they debuted by participating in 2005 WAFF Women's Championship in Jordan, in which they faced Jordan, Syria, Iran and Palestine. the team finished 4th at their first try, the committee put in a request to FIFA for a licensed female coach to lead the team. As a result, German coach Monika Staab was sent to Bahrain on January 21, 2007 for a six-month development program. Under the guidance of Staab, the team played its first official FIFA approved match on April 22, 2007, against the national team of Maldives in Malé, Maldives. During this match, Bahrain played a great game and secured a historic 7–0 win. Bahrain is currently ranked 86th in the FIFA Women's World Rankings. Bahrain to date is the best women's national team in the GCC regions, the team has gone on to attain many achievements; most notably through its participation and podium finishes in all recent tournaments.

== Record per opponent ==
Key

Positive balance (more wins than losses)
Neutral balance (as many wins as losses)
Negative balance (more losses than wins)

The following table shows Bahrain' all-time official international record per opponent:

Opponent	Pld	W	D	L	GF	GA	GD	W%	Confederation
Azerbaijan	1	0	0	1	0	4	-4	0	UEFA
Bangladesh	1	0	0	1	0	7	-7	0	AFC
Chinese Taipei	1	0	0	1	0	2	-2	0	AFC
Cyprus	2	0	0	2	1	8	-7	0	UEFA
Estonia	1	0	0	1	0	3	-3	0	UEFA
Hong Kong	3	0	0	3	3	8	-5	0	AFC
India	6	1	0	5	5	14	-9	16.67	AFC
Indonesia	3	1	0	2	4	6	-2	33.33	AFC
Iran	3	1	0	2	1	9	-8	33.33	AFC
Iraq	2	2	0	0	16	0	+16	100	AFC
Jordan	11	0	3	8	5	40	-35	0	AFC
Kyrgyzstan	5	3	0	2	7	10	-3	60	AFC
Laos	1	0	1	0	0	0	0	0	AFC
Lebanon	2	2	0	0	6	3	+3	100	AFC
Lithuania	1	0	0	1	0	2	-2	0	UEFA
Maldives	9	8	1	0	36	3	+33	88.89	AFC
Malta	1	0	1	0	1	1	0	0	UEFA
Myanmar	1	0	0	1	0	6	-6	0	AFC
Pakistan	3	3	0	0	20	2	+18	100	AFC
Palestine	10	6	2	2	30	5	+25	60	AFC
Philippines	1	0	1	0	1	1	0	0	AFC
Qatar	4	4	0	0	32	2	+30	100	AFC
Saudi Arabia	2	0	0	2	0	4	-4	0	AFC
Sri Lanka	3	3	0	0	9	1	+8	100	AFC
Syria	2	1	0	1	4	3	+1	50	AFC
Tajikistan	1	1	0	0	4	0	+4	100	AFC
Turkmenistan	1	0	1	0	2	2	0	0	AFC
United Arab Emirates	6	0	4	2	3	11	-8	0	AFC
Vietnam	1	0	0	1	0	8	-8	0	AFC
Total	88	36	14	38	191	166	+25	40.909	—

Last updated: Bahrain vs Kyrgyzstan, 7 June 2026.

=== 2005 ===
25 September 2005 2005 WAFF Women's Championship	Jordan	9–0	Bahrain	Amman, Jordan
				Stadium: Amman International Stadium

27 September 2005 2005 WAFF Women's Championship	Bahrain	0–7	Iran	Amman, Jordan
				Stadium: Amman International Stadium

29 September 2005 2005 WAFF Women's Championship	Syria	2–1	Bahrain	Amman, Jordan
				Stadium: Amman International Stadium

1 October 2005 2005 WAFF Women's Championship	Bahrain	1–1	Palestine	Amman, Jordan
				Stadium: Amman International Stadium

=== 2007 ===
22 April 2007 Friendly	Maldives	0–7	Bahrain	Malé, Maldives
				Stadium: Galolhu Rasmee Dhandu Stadium

25 April 2007 Friendly	Maldives	1–1	Bahrain	Malé, Maldives
				Stadium: Galolhu Rasmee Dhandu Stadium

=== 2010 ===
16 February 2010 Friendly	Bahrain	2–0	Indonesia	Manama, Bahrain

February 20, 2010 2010 WAFF WC	Jordan	4–1	Bahrain	Abu Dhabi, UAE

February 22, 2010 2010 WAFF WC	Bahrain	1–0	Iran	Abu Dhabi, UAE

February 26, 2010 2010 WAFF WC	United Arab Emirates	4–0	Bahrain	Abu Dhabi, UAE

February 28, 2010 2010 WAFF WC	Bahrain	3–0	Palestine	Abu Dhabi, UAE

14 October 2010 Friendly	Bahrain	1–4	Jordan	Manama, Bahrain

18 October 2010 2010 Arabia Women's Cup Group A	Bahrain	17–0	Qatar	Riffa, Bahrain
19:30 UTC+3	Al-Khalifa (??); Al-Majri (??); Mohandes (??); Al-Khalifa (??); Al-Hashmi (??); Al-Daisi (??); Fayez (??); ?? (??)	Report		Stadium: National Stadium

20 October 2010 2010 Arabia Women's Cup Group A	Bahrain	3–1	Syria	Manama, Bahrain
				Stadium: Al Ahli Stadium (Bahrain)

22 October 2010 2010 Arabia Women's Cup Group A	Bahrain	2–0	Palestine	Manama, Bahrain
				Stadium: Al Ahli Stadium (Bahrain)

25 October 2010 2010 Arabia Women's Cup SF	Bahrain	0–3	Jordan	Riffa, Bahrain
			Ibrahim 11'; Emad 31'; Mazen 66'	Stadium: National Stadium

27 October 2010 2010 Arabia Women's Cup 3rd place	Bahrain	5–1	Palestine	Riffa, Bahrain
	Al Hashmi 22' (pen.); Yaqoob 49', 59'; Al Majry 80'; Al Anood 84'		Shaheen 90' (pen.)	Stadium: National Stadium; Referee: Hoda El Awadi (Lebanon)

=== 2011 ===
8 March 2011 2012 Summer Olympics Qualifiers Group C	Jordan	1–1	Bahrain	Zarqa, Jordan
18:00 UTC+2	S. Khraisat 34'	Report	Alhashimi 2'	Stadium: Prince Mohammed Stadium; Attendance: 160; Referee: Nami Sato (Japan)

10 March 2011 2012 Summer Olympics Qualifiers Group C	Palestine	1–1	Bahrain	Zarqa, Jordan
13:30 UTC+2	N. Owda 17'	Report	Yaaqob 20'	Stadium: Prince Mohammed Stadium; Attendance: 50; Referee: Ri Hong-sil (North Korea)

12 March 2011 2012 Summer Olympics Qualifiers Group C	Bahrain	0–2	Iran	Zarqa, Jordan
13:30 UTC+2		Report	Rahimi 8', 70'	Stadium: Prince Mohammed Stadium; Attendance: 60; Referee: Nami Sato (Japan)

17 September 2011 Friendly	Bahrain	1–2	India	Manama, Bahrain
	Reem Al-Hashmi	FIFA report	Sasmita Malik 3', 35'	Stadium: Al Ahli Stadium

20 September 2011 Friendly	Bahrain	2–0	India	Manama, Bahrain
	Deena Abdulrahman; Manar Ebrahim	FIFA		Stadium: Al Ahli Stadium

23 September 2011 Friendly	Bahrain	1–3	India	Manama, Bahrain
	Mona Al Daesi 81'	FIFA	Pinky Bompal Magar 69'; Parmeshwori Devi 72'; Kamala Devi 86'	Stadium: Bahrain National Stadium

3 October 2011 2011 WAFF WC	Bahrain	12–0	Iraq	Abu Dhabi, UAE
17:45	Alhashmi 10', 15', 27', 38', 48', 60', 90+2'; Mohammad 51'; Al Khalifa 52', 71', 84'; Abdelrahman 70'	Report		Stadium: Zayed Bin Sultan Stadium

5 October 2011 2011 WAFF WC	Jordan	2–2	Bahrain	Abu Dhabi, UAE
15:15	Al-Majali 56'; Jbarah 76'	Report	Alhashmi 31', 90'	Stadium: Zayed Bin Sultan Stadium

7 October 2011 2011 WAFF WC	Bahrain	8–0	Palestine	Abu Dhabi, UAE
17:45	Abdulrahman 10'; Mohammad 18'; Alhashmi 21', 44', 65', 76'; Al Khalifa 39'; Yaaqob 69'	Report		Stadium: Zayed Bin Sultan Stadium

10 October 2011 2011 WAFF WC	Bahrain	0–4	United Arab Emirates	Abu Dhabi, UAE
17:15		Report	Marek 14'; Nacha 49'; Zerrouki 64'; Troudi 75'	Stadium: Zayed Bin Sultan Stadium

12 October 2011 2011 WAFF WC	Bahrain	0–0 (4–3 p)	Jordan	Abu Dhabi, UAE
17:15		Report		Stadium: Zayed Bin Sultan Stadium
	Penalties
	Tobellah (penalty scored); Almudhahki (penalty scored); Al-Hashmi (penalty scored); Khamis (penalty scored)		(penalty scored) Al-Naber; (penalty scored) Khraisat; (penalty scored) Khair

=== 2013 ===
14 May 2013 Friendly	Bahrain	1–2	India	Manama, Bahrain
	Reem Al-Hashmi 42'		Pinky Bompal Magar 8'; Kamala Devi 36'

16 May 2013 Friendly	Bahrain	0–2	India	Manama, Bahrain
			Prameshwori Devi 56'; Kamala Devi 71'

22 May 2013 2014 AFC WAC Q Grp C	Vietnam	8–0	Bahrain	Bahrain National Stadium, Riffa
18:00	Nguyễn Thị Minh Nguyệt 3'; Trần Thị Kim Hồng 20'; Nguyễn Thị Xuyến 22'; Nguyễn Thị Muôn 38', 58', 70'; Nguyễn Thị Liễu 45'; Nguyễn Thị Kim Tiến 65'	Report		Attendance: 200; Referee: Wang Jia (China)

24 May 2013 2014 AFC WAC Q Grp C	Bahrain	1–3	Hong Kong	Bahrain National Stadium, Riffa
18:00	Al Hashmi 25'	Report	Cheung Wai Ki 52'; Fung 65', 69'	Attendance: 80; Referee: Rita Gani (Malaysia)

26 May 2013 2014 AFC WAC Q Grp C	Kyrgyzstan	1–4	Bahrain	Bahrain National Stadium, Riffa
20:30	Tynkova 31'	Report	Abdelrahman 3', 33'; Al Hashmi 20', 49'	Attendance: 150; Referee: Shiva Yari (Iran)

3 November 2013 Friendly	Qatar	0–4	Bahrain	Doha, Qatar
--:-- UTC+3		Report

5 November 2013 Friendly	Qatar	0–3	Bahrain	Doha, Qatar
--:-- UTC+3		Report

=== 2014 ===
April 15, 2014 2014 WAFF WC	Bahrain	0–5	Jordan	Amman, Jordan
		Report		Stadium: Petra Stadium; Attendance: 700; Referee: Hussein Abo Yehia (Lebanon)

April 17, 2014 2014 WAFF WC	Bahrain	0–4	Palestine	Amman, Jordan
		Report		Stadium: Petra Stadium; Attendance: 300; Referee: Abdulrahman Al-Jassim (Qatar)

April 19, 2014 2014 WAFF WC	Bahrain	8–2	Qatar	Amman, Jordan
	Yasmeen Fayez 31', 88'; Manar Ebrahim 54', 61', 86'; Al Anood Al Khalifa 62'; Reem Al Hashmi 39'; Marwa Al Majri 90'	Report		Stadium: Petra Stadium; Attendance: 300; Referee: Ahmed Ibrahim (Jordan)

October 23, 2014 Friendly	Bahrain	5–0	Pakistan	Isa Town, Bahrain
	Reem Al Hashmi; Reem Al Hashmi; Reem Al Hashmi; Dwa Al Khalifa; Al Anood Al Khalifa			Stadium: Bahrain Football Association; Attendance: 100

October 26, 2014 Friendly	Bahrain	5–1	Pakistan	Isa Town, Bahrain
	Reem Al Hashmi; Deena Abdulrahman; Deena Abdulrahman; Yasmeen Fayez; Yasmeen Fayez		Hajra Khan	Stadium: Bahrain National Stadium; Attendance: 250

October 29, 2014 Friendly	Bahrain	10–1	Pakistan	Isa Town, Bahrain
	Reem Al Hashmi; Reem Al Hashmi; Reem Al Hashmi; Deena Abdulrahman; Shaikha Al Khalifa; Yasmeen Fayez; Yasmeen Fayez; Al Anood Al Khalifa; Manar Ebrahim; Rose Fayez		Hajra Khan	Stadium: Bahrain National Stadium; Attendance: 250

=== 2015 ===
February 20, 2015 Friendly	Bahrain	0–1	Hong Kong	Isa Town, Bahrain
				Stadium: Khalifa Sports City Stadium

February 23, 2015 Friendly	Bahrain	2–4	Hong Kong	Isa Town, Bahrain
	Reem Al Hashmi; Phoebe Licence			Stadium: Khalifa Sports City Stadium; Attendance: 200

March 12, 2015 2015 Aphrodite Women Cup Group A	Cyprus	1–0	Bahrain	Paphos, Cyprus
11:00	Antoniou 33'	Report		Stadium: Paphos Stadium

March 13, 2015 2015 Aphrodite Women Cup Group A	Bahrain	0–4	Azerbaijan	Paphos, Cyprus
11:00		Report		Stadium: Paphos Stadium

March 15, 2015 2015 Aphrodite Women Cup Group A	Bahrain	1–1	Malta	Paphos, Cyprus
15:00	Reem Al Hashmi 22'	Report	? 40'	Stadium: Paphos Stadium

March 18, 2015 2015 Aphrodite Women Cup 7th place	Bahrain	3–1	Lebanon	Paphos, Cyprus
11:00	Al Anood Al Khalifa 56'; Reem Al Hashmi 81'; Phoebe Licence 87'	Report	Bahlawan 8'	Stadium: Paphos Stadium

May 22, 2015 Friendly	Bahrain	2–0	Kyrgyzstan	Manama, Bahrain
	Reem Al Hashmi; Al Anood Al Khalifa			Stadium: Al Ahli Stadium; Attendance: 100

May 25, 2015 Friendly	Bahrain	1–0	Kyrgyzstan	Manama, Bahrain
	Reem Al Hashmi			Stadium: Al Ahli Stadium; Attendance: 100

8 December 2015 Friendly	Jordan	5–0	Bahrain	Abu Dhabi, United Arab Emirates

=== 2016 ===
January 24, 2016 Friendly	Bahrain	4–0	Maldives	Hamad Town, Bahrain
	Reem Al Hashmi; Manar Jassim	Report		Stadium: Hamad Town Stadium; Attendance: 150

January 28, 2016 Friendly	Bahrain	1–0	Maldives	Riffa, Bahrain
	Yasmine Fayez	Report		Stadium: Riffa Club; Attendance: 150

=== 2017 ===
January 21, 2017 Friendly	Bahrain	5–1	Maldives	Isa Town, Bahrain
	Reem Al Hashmi; Yasmine Fayez; Yasmine Fayez; Own goal Al Anood Al Khalifa			Stadium: Bahrain Football Association; Attendance: 150

January 24, 2017 Friendly	Bahrain	3–1	Maldives	Hamad Town, Bahrain
	Reem Al Hashmi; Reem Al Hashmi; Al Anood Al Khalifa			Stadium: Hamad Town Stadium; Attendance: 150

11 March 2017 2017 Aphrodite Women Cup Group B	Bahrain	0–3	Estonia	Parekklisia, Cyprus
10:30 UTC+2		Report	Saar 9'; Rosen 64'; Loo 90'	Stadium: Parekklisia Stadium; Attendance: 0 Referee: Demetra Charalambous (Cyprus)

12 March 2017 2017 Aphrodite Women Cup Group B	Lithuania	2–0	Bahrain	Parekklisia, Cyprus
9 UTC+2		Report		Stadium: Parekklisia Stadium

15 March 2017 2017 Aphrodite Women Cup 5th place	Cyprus	7–1	Bahrain	Parekklisia, Cyprus
10 UTC+2	Chrisostomou 6', 42'; Giannou 34'; Panagiotou 60'; Georgiou 66'; Violari 79'; Solomou 89'	Report	?? 1'	Stadium: Parekklisia Stadium

3 April 2017 2018 AFC AC Q.	Bahrain	0–6	Jordan	Pamir Stadium, Dushanbe
13:00		Report	Jebreen 9'; Jbarah 22', 30', 43'; Al-Naber 86'; Al-Masri 90'	Attendance: 40; Referee: Rebecca Durcau (Australia)

5 April 2017 2018 AFC AC Q.	Bahrain	4–0	Tajikistan	Pamir Stadium, Dushanbe
16:00	Al-Hashmi 17', 20', 78'; Al-Dossary 46'	Report		Attendance: 60; Referee: Oh Hyeon-jeong (South Korea)

7 April 2017 2018 AFC AC Q.	United Arab Emirates	1–1	Bahrain	Pamir Stadium, Dushanbe
13:00	Jaseem 50'	Report	Abdulrahman 84'	Attendance: 30; Referee: Pansa Chaisanit (Thailand)

10 April 2017 2018 AFC AC Q.	Philippines	1–1	Bahrain	Pamir Stadium, Dushanbe
19:00	S. Castañeda 82'	Report	Al-Dossary 55'	Attendance: 50; Referee: Rebecca Durcau (Australia)

12 April 2017 2018 AFC AC Q.	Bahrain	4–0	Iraq	Pamir Stadium, Dushanbe
19:00	Al-Hashmi 31'; Abdulrahman 41', 71'; Tobellah 80' (pen.)	Report		Attendance: 30; Referee: Anna Sidorova (Uzbekistan)

=== 2018 ===
3 December 2018 Friendly	Bahrain	7–0	Maldives	Manama, Bahrain
16:00

5 December 2018 Friendly	Bahrain	4–0	Maldives	Manama, Bahrain
16:00				Stadium: Al Ahli Stadium

9 December 2018 Friendly	Bahrain	4–0	Maldives	Manama, Bahrain
16:00		Report		Stadium: Al Ahli Stadium

17 December 2018 Friendly	Bahrain	5–0	Sri Lanka	Manama, Bahrain
15:00		Report		Stadium: Al Ahli Stadium

20 December 2018 Friendly	Bahrain	2–0	Sri Lanka	Manama, Bahrain
15:00				Stadium: Al Ahli Stadium

23 December 2018 Friendly	Bahrain	2–1	Sri Lanka	Manama, Bahrain
15:00		Report		Stadium: Al Ahli Stadium

=== 2019 ===
7 January 2019 2019 WAFF WC	Bahrain	3–2	Lebanon	Muharraq, Bahrain
16:00	Licence 69'; Alisa 78', 81'	AFC Report; Report	Tamim 57'; Kasty 90+1'	Stadium: Al Muharraq Stadium

9 January 2019 2019 WAFF WC	Bahrain	5–0	Palestine	Muharraq, Bahrain
13:00	Tobellah 45+1' (pen.), 75'; Alisa 56'; Ramadhan 73'; Sabkar 79'	AFC Report; Report		Stadium: Al Muharraq Stadium

13 January 2019 2019 WAFF WC	United Arab Emirates	1–1	Bahrain	Muharraq, Bahrain
13:00	Aladwan 35'	AFC Report	Alisa 19'	Stadium: Al Muharraq Stadium

15 January 2019 2019 WAFF WC	Jordan	1–0	Bahrain	Muharraq, Bahrain
16:00	Al-Naber 67'	AFC Report		Stadium: Al Muharraq Stadium

=== 2021 ===
10 October Friendly	Bahrain	0–5	India	Hamad Town, Bahrain
		Report	Basfore 13'; Xaxa 19', 68' (red card) 73'; Kathiresan 34'; Manisha K. 69'	Stadium: Hamad Town Stadium

21 October 2021 2022 AFC Women's Asian Cup qualification Group A	Bahrain	0–0	Laos	Arad, Bahrain
18:00 UTC+3		Report		Stadium: Al Muharraq Stadium; Referee: Haneed Murad (Jordan)

24 October 2021 2022 AFC Women's Asian Cup qualification Group A	Chinese Taipei	2–0	Bahrain	Arad, Bahrain
18:00 UTC+3	Lai Li-chin 60'; Chen Yen-ping 77'	Report		Stadium: Al Muharraq Stadium; Attendance: 257; Referee: Sunita Thongthawin (Thailand)

=== 2024 ===
1 June Friendly	Bahrain	0–1	Palestine	Manama, Bahrain
18:45 UTC+3		Report	Nasr 80'	Stadium: Al Ahli Stadium; Referee: Esraa Al-Mbaiden (Jordan)

4 June Friendly	Palestine	2–1	Bahrain	Manama, Bahrain
18:45 UTC+3	Nasr 1'; Al-Kord 62'	Report	Al-Isa 5'	Stadium: Al Ahli Stadium; Referee: Esraa Al-Mbaiden (Jordan)

8 June Friendly	Bahrain	2–3	Indonesia	Manama, Bahrain
18:45 UTC+3	Sabkar 63'; Al-Ali 78'	Report	Safira I. 4'; Octavianti D. 26'; Scheunemann 43'	Stadium: Al Ahli Stadium

11 June Friendly	Indonesia	3–0	Bahrain	Manama, Bahrain
18:30 UTC+3	Scheunemann 57'; Zahra M. 70'; Citra R. 90+2'			Stadium: Al Ahli Stadium

=== 2025 ===
29 May Friendly	United Arab Emirates	0–0	Bahrain	Al-Khawaneej, United Arab Emirates
19:45 UTC+4		Report		Stadium: UAEFA Stadium; Referee: Shahenda El Maghrabi (Egypt)

2 June Friendly	United Arab Emirates	2–2	Bahrain	Al-Khawaneej, United Arab Emirates
19:45 UTC+4	Lindborg 63'; Bhandari 69'	Report	Al-Mannaei 44'; Al-Isa 66'	Stadium: UAEFA Stadium; Referee: Shahenda El Maghrabi (Egypt)

12 June Friendly	Saudi Arabia	1–0	Bahrain	Taif, Saudi Arabia
10:00 UTC+3	Tawfiq 89'			Stadium: King Fahd Sports City

29 June 2026 AFC Asian Cup qualification	Bahrain	0–7	Bangladesh	Yangon, Myanmar
19:00 UTC+6:30		Report	Shamsunnahar Jr. 10'; Ritu Porna 15'; Kohati 40'; Tohura 45+2', 45+3'; Rawan Al Ali 59' (o.g.); Munki 74'	Stadium: Thuwunna Stadium; Referee: Kanika Barman (India)

2 July 2026 AFC Asian Cup qualification	Turkmenistan	2–2	Bahrain	Yangon, Myanmar
16:00 UTC+6:30	Çaryýewa 84'; Alymjanowa 89'	Report	Sabkar 87'; Al-Isa 90+6'	Stadium: Thuwunna Stadium

5 July 2026 AFC Asian Cup qualification	Myanmar	6–0	Bahrain	Yangon, Myanmar
--:-- UTC+7	Shwe Yee Tun 40', 42'; Khin Mo Mo Tun 45+5'; Win Theingi Tun 53'; May Htet Lu 58'; Win Win 73'	Report		Stadium: Thuwunna Stadium; Referee: Supiree Testhomya (Thailand)

=== 2026 ===
26 February Friendly	Bahrain	0–3	Saudi Arabia	Manama, Bahrain
21:00 UTC+3		Report	Tawfiq 55'; Khalid 57'; Al-Omaysi 79'	Stadium: Al Ahli Stadium

4 June Friendly	Bahrain	0–5	Kyrgyzstan	Manama, Bahrain
19:00 UTC+3			Saiakbaeva 21', 39'; Boronbekova 30', 52'; Ishembieva 60'	Stadium: BFA Outdoor Pitches; Referee: Alissar Baddour (Syria)

7 June Friendly	Bahrain	0–4	Kyrgyzstan	Manama, Bahrain
19:00 UTC+3			Turalieva 65'; Kurmanbekova 72'; Murzakulova 80'; Asanbekova 90+5'	Stadium: BFA Outdoor Pitches

== See also ==
- Bahrain national football team results
