= 2011 WAFF Women's Championship =

4th edition of the WAFF Women's Championship

Tournament details
- Host country: United Arab Emirates
- Dates: 3−12 October
- Teams: 8 (from 1 confederation)
- Venue: 1 (in 1 host city)

Final positions
- Champions: United Arab Emirates (2nd title)
- Runners-up: Iran
- Third place: Bahrain
- Fourth place: Jordan

Tournament statistics
- Matches played: 16
- Goals scored: 84 (5.25 per match)
- Top scorer: (Bahrain) Reem Al Hashmi (13 goals)

The 2011 WAFF Women's Championship tournament was held from 3 to 12 October 2011 in Abu Dhabi, United Arab Emirates. It was the fourth West Asian Football Federation Women's Championship held.

The UAE successfully defended their title by beating Iran in the final.

== Draw ==
Eight teams entered the tournament and were drawn into two groups of four nations. The draw for the competition was made on 2 October 2011.

Group A	Group B
Bahrain; Iraq; Jordan; Palestine	Iran; Lebanon; Syria; United Arab Emirates (Hosts & Holders)

== Group stage ==
All times given as local time (UTC+3)

=== Group A ===
Team	Pld	W	D	L	GF	GA	GD	Pts
Bahrain	3	2	1	0	22	2	+20	7
Jordan	3	2	1	0	14	3	+11	7
Palestine	3	1	0	2	4	16	−12	3
Iraq	3	0	0	3	0	19	−19	0

3 October 2011
14:30

Jordan	8–1	Palestine
Alnaber 28'; Jbarah 50', 55', 60', 73', 90+2'; Sweilem 82'; Al-Majali 88'	Report	Hussein 26'

Zayed Bin Sultan Stadium, Abu Dhabi

3 October 2011
17:45

Bahrain	12–0	Iraq
Alhashmi 10', 15', 27', 38', 48', 60', 90+2'; Mohammad 51'; Al Khalifa 52', 71', 84'; Abdelrahman 70'	Report

Zayed Bin Sultan Stadium, Abu Dhabi

5 October 2011
15:15

Jordan	2–2	Bahrain
Al-Majali 56'; Jbarah 76'	Report	Alhashmi 31', 90'

Zayed Bin Sultan Stadium, Abu Dhabi

5 October 2011
17:45

Palestine	3–0	Iraq
Salama 16' (pen.); Sohagian 60'; Walaa Hussein 61'	Report

Zayed Bin Sultan Stadium, Abu Dhabi

7 October 2011
14:30

Iraq	0–4	Jordan
	Report	Alnaber 6'; Jbarah 21'; Alnahar 46'; Dihmis 47'

Zayed Bin Sultan Stadium, Abu Dhabi

7 October 2011
17:45

Bahrain	8–0	Palestine
Abdulrahman 10'; Mohammad 18'; Alhashmi 21', 44', 65', 76'; Al Khalifa 39'; Yaaqob 69'	Report

Zayed Bin Sultan Stadium, Abu Dhabi

=== Group B ===
Team	Pld	W	D	L	GF	GA	GD	Pts
Iran	3	3	0	0	16	3	+13	9
United Arab Emirates	3	2	0	1	12	4	+8	6
Lebanon	3	1	0	2	2	13	−11	3
Syria	3	0	0	3	1	11	−10	0

4 October 2011
15:15

United Arab Emirates	6–0	Syria
Zerrouki 5', 60'; Marek 39', 45+1', 54', 87'	Report

Zayed Bin Sultan Stadium, Abu Dhabi

4 October 2011
18:30

Iran	8–1	Lebanon
Karimi 16', 69'; Ghomi 65', 75'; Rahimi 67', 83'; 85' (o.g.); Ghanbari 88'	Report	Assaf 36'

Zayed Bin Sultan Stadium, Abu Dhabi

6 October 2011
14:30

United Arab Emirates	1–4	Iran
Mamay 18'	Report	Rahimi 10', 79'; Ardallan 30' (pen.); Ghomi 90+4'

Zayed Bin Sultan Stadium, Abu Dhabi

6 October 2011
17:45

Syria	0–1	Lebanon
	Report	Saleh 90+1'

Zayed Bin Sultan Stadium, Abu Dhabi

8 October 2011
14:30

United Arab Emirates	5–0	Lebanon
Hassanin 1'; Marek 16'; Zerrouki 44'; Troudi 58'; Nacha 64'	Report

Zayed Bin Sultan Stadium, Abu Dhabi

8 October 2011
17:45

Iran	4–1	Syria
Yousefpour 15', 32'; Gholami 44', 49'	Report	Alshater 66'

Zayed Bin Sultan Stadium, Abu Dhabi

== Knockout stage ==
Semi-finals
10 October
Bahrain	0
United Arab Emirates	4
10 October
Iran	3
Jordan	2

Final
12 October
United Arab Emirates	2 (6)
Iran	2 (5)
Third place
12 October
Bahrain	0 (4)
Jordan	0 (3)

=== Semi-finals ===
10 October 2011
17:15

Bahrain	0–4	United Arab Emirates
	Report	Marek 14'; Nacha 49'; Zerrouki 64'; Troudi 75'

Zayed Bin Sultan Stadium, Abu Dhabi

10 October 2011
20:30

Iran	3–2	Jordan
Rahimi 56', 72', 82'	Report	Jebreen 3'; Al-Majali 86'

Zayed Bin Sultan Stadium, Abu Dhabi

=== Third-place match ===
12 October 2011
17:15

Bahrain	0–0	Jordan
	Report
Penalties
Tobellah (penalty scored); Almudhahki (penalty scored); Alhashmi (penalty scored); Khamis (penalty scored)	4–3	(penalty scored) Al-Naber; (penalty scored) Khraisat; (penalty scored) Khair

Zayed Bin Sultan Stadium, Abu Dhabi

=== Final ===
12 October 2011
20:30

United Arab Emirates	2–2	Iran
Maaouia 46'; Zerrouki 84' (pen.)	Report	Arzhangi 38'; Rahimi 53' (pen.)
Penalties
Hassanin (penalty scored); Troudi (penalty scored); Nacha (penalty scored); Zerrouki (penalty scored); Marek (penalty scored); Boucetta (penalty scored)	6–5	Ardallani (penalty scored); Rahimi (penalty scored); Arzhangi (penalty scored); Khosravi (penalty scored); Ghomi (penalty scored)

Zayed Bin Sultan Stadium, Abu Dhabi

2011 West Asian Football Federation Women's champions

United Arab Emirates
Second title

== Goalscorers ==
13 goals

- (Bahrain) Reem Al Hashmi

8 goals

- (Iran) Maryam Rahimi

7 goals

- (Jordan) Maysa Jbarah

6 goals

- (United Arab Emirates) Djamila Marek

5 goals

- (United Arab Emirates) Dalila Zerrouki

4 goals

- (Bahrain) Alanood Al Khalifa

3 goals

- (Iran) Sara Ghomi
- (Jordan) Ayah Al-Majali

2 goals

- (Bahrain) Deena Abdelrahman
- (Bahrain) Marwa Mohammad
- (Iran) Nasimeh Gholami
- (Iran) Fereshteh Karimi
- (Iran) Mahboobeh Yousefpour
- (Jordan) Stephanie Alnaber
- (Palestine) Walaa Huessin
- (United Arab Emirates) Ouafae Nacha
- (United Arab Emirates) Imen Troudi

1 goal

- (Bahrain) Manar Yaaqob
- (Iran) Niloofar Ardallani
- (Iran) Fatemeh Arzhangi
- (Iran) Zahra Ghanbari
- (Jordan) Abeer Alnahar
- (Jordan) Lara Dihmis
- (Jordan) Shahnaz Jebreen
- (Jordan) Mai Sweilem
- (Lebanon) Nadia Assaf
- (Lebanon) Ghinwa Saleh
- (Palestine) Kiloudi Salama
- (Palestine) Caroline Sohagian
- (Syria) Amneh Alshater
- (United Arab Emirates) Sara Hassanin
- (United Arab Emirates) Oumayma Maaouia
- (United Arab Emirates) Sabrine Mamay

1 own goal

- (Lebanon) (playing against Iran)
