= Farzaneh Tavassoli =

Iranian futsal player (born 1987)

Personal information
- Full name: Farzaneh Tavassoli
- Date of birth: January 19, 1987 (age 39)
- Place of birth: Tehran, Iran
- Height: 1.60 m (5 ft 3 in)
- Position: Goalkeeper

Team information
- Current team: Peykan Tehran
- Number: 1

Senior career*
Years	Team	Apps	(Gls)
2007-2008	Esteghlal Jonoub Dezful		
2008-2009	Rah Ahan Tehran		
2009-2011	Tejarat Khane Bandar Abbas		
2011-2013	Meli Hafari Ahvaz		
2013-2016	Islamic Azad University		
2016-2018	Palayesh Naft Abadan		
2018-2020	Namino Esfahan		
2020-2021	Saipa Tehran		
2021-2022	Nasr Fardis Karaj		
2022-present	Peykan Tehran		

International career
2002-present	Iran		
- * Club domestic league appearances and goals

Farzaneh Tavassoli (Persian: فرزانه توسلی, born January 19, 1987, in Tehran, Iran) is an Iranian futsal player. She was the goalkeeper and captain of Iran women's national futsal team and a member of the Peykan Tehran women's futsal team.

Tavassoli is considered one of the golden generation of Iranian women's futsal players who succeeded in winning two consecutive AFC Women's Futsal Championship championships for Iran.

== Honors ==
=== Player ===
==== Club ====
1. Winning the Iranian Women's Futsal Premier League 2007 with Esteghlal Jonoub Dezful
2. Winning the Iranian Women's Futsal Premier League 2008 with Rah Ahan Tehran
3. Winning the Iranian Women's Futsal Premier League 2009 with Tejarat Khane Bandar Abbas
4. Winning the Iranian Women's Futsal Premier League 2010 with Tejarat Khane Bandar Abbas
5. Winning the Iranian Women's Futsal Premier League 2012 with Meli Hafari Ahvaz
6. Winning the Iranian Women's Futsal Premier League 2013 with Meli Hafari Ahvaz
7. Winning the Iranian Women's Futsal Premier League 2015 with Islamic Azad University
8. Winning the Iranian Women's Futsal Premier League 2017 with Palayesh Naft Abadan
9. Winning the Iranian Women's Futsal Premier League 2018 with Namino Esfahan

==== National ====
1. Champion in Futsal Tournaments of Islamic and Asian Capitals (Iran 2005)
2. Championship in West Asian Futsal Tournament (Jordan 2008)
3. Runner-up in the Asian women's indoor futsal tournament (South Korea 2013)
4. Champion in the AFC Women's Futsal Championship (Malaysia 2015)
5. 3rd place in the Asian women's indoor futsal tournament (Turkmenistan 2017)
6. Champion in the AFC Women's Futsal Championship (Thailand 2018)
7. Champion in the CAFA Women's Futsal Championship (Tajikistan 2022)

==== Individual ====
1. The best goalkeeper of Iranian Women's Futsal Premier League 2007
2. The best goalkeeper of the Russian women's futsal tournament (2014)
3. The best goalkeeper of the AFC Women's Futsal Championship (Malaysia 2015)
4. The best goalkeeper of Iranian Women's Futsal Premier League 2015
5. The seventh best goalkeeper in the world in 2015
6. The best goalkeeper of Iranian Women's Futsal Premier League 2017
7. The best goalkeeper of the AFC Women's Futsal Championship (Thailand 2018)
8. The sixth best goalkeeper in the world in 2018
9. The sixth best goalkeeper in the world in 2019
