= Oumayma =

Oumayma, also spelled Umaima, is an Arabic feminine given name. Notable people with the name include:

- Oumayma Belahbib (born 1996), Moroccan amateur boxer
- Oumayma Ben Maaouia, Tunisian footballer and manager
- Oumayma Dardour (born 1996), Tunisian handball player
- Umaima al-Khamis (born 1966), Saudi Arabian author
