= Iranian Women's Futsal Premier League 2021 =

Iranian Women's Futsal Premier League
- Season: 2021
- Champions: Peykan Tehran
- Matches: 98
- Goals: 593 (6.05 per match)
- Top goalscorer: Maral Torkaman
- Biggest home win: Nasr Fardis Karaj 12–0 Kimia Esfarayen
- Biggest away win: Parsara Shiraz 5–14 Nasr Fardis Karaj
- Highest scoring: Parsara Shiraz 5–14 Nasr Fardis Karaj

Iranian Women's Futsal Premier League 2021 The 17th season of the Women's Futsal Premier League is the highest level of the Iranian Women's Futsal Premier League, which started with the presence of 14 teams on November 28, 2021, by the decision of the board members. The new season of the Women's Futsal Premier League will be carried out with the new instructions by the managers of the Futsal League organization.

In fact, with the new instructions, an important step is to be taken towards the professionalization of the Women's Futsal Premier League matches, and for the next season of the matches in 2022, the Super League matches are planned.

According to the new instructions, the 17th season of the Women's Futsal Premier League will begin with 16 teams in two groups of 8 teams. Then, 4 teams from each group will go to the playoff stage, and in the playoff stage, after the competition of 8 teams, the task of the four teams present in the semi-final stage will be determined.

It is worth mentioning that in this way, the 8 teams that will advance from the preliminary stage will be the teams that form the Iranian Women's Futsal Super League 2022.

On the day of the draw, 16 teams participated in the draw, but with the cancellation of Namino Isfahan and Saipa Tehran, the number of teams in the league reached 14.

== Survival playoffs ==
According to the new instructions, the number of teams in the Premier League should have reached 16, of which 12 teams are ready to participate in the new league from last season, 2 teams have advanced from League One, and Farhan Mallard's team has one point. Under these circumstances, the Futsal League Organization decided to hold a play-off match to select the 16th team to participate in the new season. The match between the two teams of Shahrvand Sari and Heyat Football Isfahan, which were at the bottom of the Premier League groups last season.

This game was held on August 29, 2021, in Ghayanouri Hall of Tehran, and finally the Heyat Football Isfahan team managed to cross the Shahrvand Sari barrier with a result of 4:3 and become the 16th team of the new season of the Women's Futsal Premier League.

== Peykan enters the field of team building ==
After speculations about the possible entry of several active clubs in the Persian Gulf Pro League, this news was finally realized with the presence of Peykan Tehran in the new season of the Women's Futsal Premier League. Peykan acquired the license to participate in the new season of the Women's Futsal Premier League by purchasing Rahiab Gostar Tehran.

== Withdrawal of two teams ==
The teams of Namino Isfahan and Saipa Tehran, due to financial problems and the unwillingness of the managers of this club to participate in women's futsal, despite their names being included in the Premier League draw, sent their resignation letter to the league organization. The contenders of the previous seasons of the Women's Futsal Premier League are considered to be the big absentees of the 17th league with their resignation.

== Participating teams ==
The draw ceremony of the 17th Iranian Women's Futsal Premier League was held on Tuesday, August 31, 2021, in the presence of Hassan Kamranifar, Secretary General of the Football Federation, and Seyedeh Shohreh Mousavi, Vice President of the Women's Football Federation. The 16 participating teams were divided into two groups of 8 teams:

Group	Team Name
First Group	Palayesh Naft Abadan
First Group	Chips Kamel Mashhad
First Group	Mes Kerman
First Group	Heyat Football Roodan
First Group	Poyandegan Sanaat Fajr Shiraz
First Group	Farhan Malard
First Group	Buta Plus Iranian
Second Group	Meli Hafari Ahvaz
Second Group	Mes Rafsanjan
Second Group	Peykan Tehran
Second Group	Parsara Shiraz
Second Group	Kimia Esfarayen
Second Group	Heyat Football Isfahan
Second Group	Nasr Fardis Karaj

It is worth mentioning that the names of Namino Isfahan and Saipa Tehran teams have been removed from the table due to canceling their participation in the competitions.

== Preliminary stage competitions ==
After two interruptions in the beginning of the Women's Futsal Premier League competitions, finally, the first week of these competitions was held on October 29, 2021, with 6 matches.

=== The first half of the season ===
==== First week ====
The first group (rest: Buta Plus Iranian)
#	Guest team	Result	The host team	Date	hours
1	Mes Kerman	3-1	Chips Kamel Mashhad	29 October 2021	11 AM
2	Heyat Football Roodan	2-3	Poyandegan Sanaat Fajr Shiraz	29 October 2021	11 AM
3	Farhan Malard	1-8	Palayesh Naft Abadan	29 October 2021	11 AM
The first group (rest: Meli Hafari Ahvaz)
#	Guest team	Result	The host team	Date	hours
1	Mes Rafsanjan	1-4	Peykan Tehran	29 October 2021	11 AM
2	Parsara Shiraz	2-1	Heyat Football Isfahan	29 October 2021	11 AM
3	Kimia Esfarayen	0-12	Nasr Fardis Karaj	29 October 2021	11 AM

==== Second week ====
The first group (rest: Poyandegan Sanaat Fajr Shiraz)
#	Guest team	Result	The host team	Date	hours
1	Heyat Football Roodan	1-2	Mes Kerman	5 November 2021	11 AM
2	Palayesh Naft Abadan	5-1	Chips Kamel Mashhad	5 November 2021	11 AM
3	Buta Plus Iranian	5-5	Farhan Malard	6 November 2021	11 AM
The second group (rest: Heyat Football Isfahan)
#	Guest team	Result	The host team	Date	hours
1	Parsara Shiraz	0-8	Mes Rafsanjan	5 November 2021	11 AM
2	Nasr Fardis Karaj	1-3	Peykan Tehran	5 November 2021	11 AM
3	Meli Hafari Ahvaz	6-2	Kimia Esfarayen	5 November 2021	12 PM

==== Third week ====
The first group (rest: Heyat Football Roodan)
#	Guest team	Result	The host team	Date	hours
1	Mes Kerman	0-3	Palayesh Naft Abadan	12 November 2021	11 AM
2	Chips Kamel Mashhad	1-5	Buta Plus Iranian	12 November 2021	11 AM
3	Farhan Malard	9-2	Poyandegan Sanaat Fajr Shiraz	12 November 2021	11 AM
The second group (rest: Parsara Shiraz)
#	Guest team	Result	The host team	Date	hours
1	Mes Rafsanjan	2-2	Nasr Fardis Karaj	12 November 2021	11 AM
2	Peykan Tehran	2-1	Meli Hafari Ahvaz	12 November 2021	11 AM
3	Kimia Esfarayen	2-1	Heyat Football Isfahan	12 November 2021	11 AM

==== Forth week ====
The first group (rest: Mes Kerman)
#	Guest team	Result	The host team	Date	hours
1	Buta Plus Iranian	2-2	Palayesh Naft Abadan	19 November 2021	11 AM
2	Heyat Football Roodan	4-6	Farhan Malard	19 November 2021	11 AM
3	Poyandegan Sanaat Fajr Shiraz	3-3	Chips Kamel Mashhad	19 November 2021	11 AM
The second group (rest: Mes Rafsanjan)
#	Guest team	Result	The host team	Date	hours
1	Meli Hafari Ahvaz	2-6	Nasr Fardis Karaj	19 November 2021	11 AM
2	Parsara Shiraz	2-4	Kimia Esfarayen	19 November 2021	11 AM
3	Heyat Football Isfahan	2-4	Peykan Tehran	19 November 2021	11 AM

==== Fifth week ====
The first group (rest: Farhan Malard)
#	Guest team	Result	The host team	Date	hours
1	Mes Kerman	0-4	Buta Plus Iranian	26 November 2021	11 AM
2	Palayesh Naft Abadan	5-0	Poyandegan Sanaat Fajr Shiraz	26 November 2021	11 AM
3	Chips Kamel Mashhad	1-6	Heyat Football Roodan	26 November 2021	11 AM
The second group (rest: Kimia Esfarayen)
#	Guest team	Result	The host team	Date	hours
1	Mes Rafsanjan	1-2	Meli Hafari Ahvaz	26 November 2021	11 AM
2	Nasr Fardis Karaj	9-1	Heyat Football Isfahan	26 November 2021	11 AM
3	Peykan Tehran	6-0	Parsara Shiraz	26 November 2021	11 AM

==== Sixth week ====
The first group (rest: Chips Kamel Mashhad)
#	Guest team	Result	The host team	Date	hours
1	Farhan Malard	4-0	Mes Kerman	3 December 2021	11 AM
2	Poyandegan Sanaat Fajr Shiraz	0-3	Buta Plus Iranian	3 December 2021	11 AM
3	Heyat Football Roodan	2-13	Palayesh Naft Abadan	3 December 2021	11 AM
The second group (rest: Peykan Tehran)
#	Guest team	Result	The host team	Date	hours
1	Kimia Esfarayen	2-8	Mes Rafsanjan	3 December 2021	11 AM
2	Heyat Football Isfahan	1-10	Meli Hafari Ahvaz	3 December 2021	11 AM
3	Parsara Shiraz	0-9	Nasr Fardis Karaj	3 December 2021	11 AM

==== Seventh week ====
The first group (rest: Palayesh Naft Abadan)
#	Guest team	Result	The host team	Date	hours
1	Mes Kerman	1-2	Poyandegan Sanaat Fajr Shiraz	10 December 2021	11 AM
2	Chips Kamel Mashhad	1-3	Farhan Malard	10 December 2021	11 AM
3	Buta Plus Iranian	10-1	Heyat Football Roodan	10 December 2021	11 AM
The second group (rest: Nasr Fardis Karaj)
#	Guest team	Result	The host team	Date	hours
1	Mes Rafsanjan	3-0	Heyat Football Isfahan	10 December 2021	11 AM
2	Peykan Tehran	8-0	Kimia Esfarayen	10 December 2021	11 AM
3	Meli Hafari Ahvaz	3-1	Parsara Shiraz	10 December 2021	11 AM

=== The second half of the season ===
==== Eighth week ====
The first group (rest: Buta Plus Iranian)
#	Guest team	Result	The host team	Date	hours
1	Chips Kamel Mashhad	1-1	Mes Kerman	24 December 2021	11 AM
2	Poyandegan Sanaat Fajr Shiraz	8-4	Heyat Football Roodan	24 December 2021	11 AM
3	Palayesh Naft Abadan	3-1	Farhan Malard	24 December 2021	11 AM
The first group (rest: Meli Hafari Ahvaz)
#	Guest team	Result	The host team	Date	hours
1	Peykan Tehran	4-0	Mes Rafsanjan	24 December 2021	11 AM
2	Heyat Football Isfahan	5-5	Parsara Shiraz	24 December 2021	11 AM
3	Nasr Fardis Karaj	12-1	Kimia Esfarayen	24 December 2021	11 AM

==== Ninth week ====
The first group (rest: Poyandegan Sanaat Fajr Shiraz)
#	Guest team	Result	The host team	Date	hours
1	Mes Kerman	1-3	Heyat Football Roodan	31 December 2021	11 AM
2	Chips Kamel Mashhad	2-3	Palayesh Naft Abadan	31 December 2021	11 AM
3	Farhan Malard	2-2	Buta Plus Iranian	31 December 2021	11 AM
The second group (rest: Heyat Football Isfahan)
#	Guest team	Result	The host team	Date	hours
1	Mes Rafsanjan	6-1	Parsara Shiraz	31 December 2021	11 AM
2	Peykan Tehran	1-4	Nasr Fardis Karaj	31 December 2021	11 AM
3	Kimia Esfarayen	1-4	Meli Hafari Ahvaz	31 December 2021	11 AM

==== Tenth week ====
The first group (rest: Heyat Football Roodan)
#	Guest team	Result	The host team	Date	hours
1	Palayesh Naft Abadan	4-0	Mes Kerman	7 January 2022	11 AM
2	Buta Plus Iranian	3-1	Chips Kamel Mashhad	7 January 2022	11 AM
3	Poyandegan Sanaat Fajr Shiraz	1-5	Farhan Malard	7 January 2022	11 AM
The second group (rest: Parsara Shiraz)
#	Guest team	Result	The host team	Date	hours
1	Nasr Fardis Karaj	3-1	Mes Rafsanjan	7 January 2022	11 AM
2	Meli Hafari Ahvaz	0-2	Peykan Tehran	7 January 2022	11 AM
3	Heyat Football Isfahan	5-3	Kimia Esfarayen	7 January 2022	11 AM

==== Eleventh week ====
The first group (rest: Mes Kerman)
#	Guest team	Result	The host team	Date	hours
1	Palayesh Naft Abadan	5-1	Buta Plus Iranian	14 January 2022	11 AM
2	Farhan Malard	3-1	Heyat Football Roodan	14 January 2022	11 AM
3	Chips Kamel Mashhad	0-3	Poyandegan Sanaat Fajr Shiraz	14 January 2022	11 AM
The second group (rest: Mes Rafsanjan)
#	Guest team	Result	The host team	Date	hours
1	Nasr Fardis Karaj	0-3	Meli Hafari Ahvaz	14 January 2022	11 AM
2	Kimia Esfarayen	4-4	Parsara Shiraz	14 January 2022	11 AM
3	Peykan Tehran	3-2	Heyat Football Isfahan	14 January 2022	11 AM

==== Twelfth week ====
The first group (rest: Farhan Malard)
#	Guest team	Result	The host team	Date	hours
1	Buta Plus Iranian	2-0	Mes Kerman	21 January 2022	11 AM
2	Poyandegan Sanaat Fajr Shiraz	1-7	Palayesh Naft Abadan	21 January 2022	11 AM
3	Heyat Football Roodan	8-2	Chips Kamel Mashhad	21 January 2022	11 AM
The second group (rest: Kimia Esfarayen)
#	Guest team	Result	The host team	Date	hours
1	Meli Hafari Ahvaz	0-3	Mes Rafsanjan	9 February 2022	11 AM
2	Heyat Football Isfahan	0-9	Nasr Fardis Karaj	9 February 2022	11 AM
3	Parsara Shiraz	1-7	Peykan Tehran	21 January 2022	11 AM

==== Thirteenth week ====
The first group (rest: Chips Kamel Mashhad)
#	Guest team	Result	The host team	Date	hours
1	Mes Kerman	1-1	Farhan Malard	28 January 2022	11 AM
2	Buta Plus Iranian	10-1	Poyandegan Sanaat Fajr Shiraz	28 January 2022	11 AM
3	Palayesh Naft Abadan	1-0	Heyat Football Roodan	28 January 2022	11 AM
The second group (rest: Peykan Tehran)
#	Guest team	Result	The host team	Date	hours
1	Mes Rafsanjan	0-3	Kimia Esfarayen	28 January 2022	11 AM
2	Meli Hafari Ahvaz	5-2	Heyat Football Isfahan	14 February 2022	11 AM
3	Nasr Fardis Karaj	14-5	Parsara Shiraz	14 February 2022	11 AM

==== Fourteenth week ====
The first group (rest: Palayesh Naft Abadan)
#	Guest team	Result	The host team	Date	hours
1	Poyandegan Sanaat Fajr Shiraz	0-1	Mes Kerman	4 February 2022	11 AM
2	Farhan Malard	7-6	Chips Kamel Mashhad	4 February 2022	11 AM
3	Heyat Football Roodan	2-10	Buta Plus Iranian	4 February 2022	11 AM
The second group (rest: Nasr Fardis Karaj)
#	Guest team	Result	The host team	Date	hours
1	Heyat Football Isfahan	0-3	Mes Rafsanjan	4 February 2022	11 AM
2	Kimia Esfarayen	2-7	Peykan Tehran	4 February 2022	11 AM
3	Parsara Shiraz	3-6	Meli Hafari Ahvaz	18 February 2022	11 AM

== Preliminary stage table ==
First group	Pos	Team	Played	W	D	L	GF	GA	GD	Pts	Qualification
First group	1	Palayesh Naft Abadan	12	11	1	0	59	11	+48	34	Promotion to the playoffs
First group	2	Buta Plus Iranian	12	8	3	1	57	20	+37	27	Promotion to the playoffs
First group	3	Farhan Malard	12	7	3	2	47	34	+13	24	Promotion to the playoffs
First group	4	Poyandegan Sanaat Fajr Shiraz	12	4	1	7	24	50	-26	13	Promotion to the playoffs
First group	5	Heyat Football Roodan	12	3	2	7	10	26	-16	11	-
First group	6	Mes Kerman	12	4	0	9	34	60	-26	9	-
First group	7	Chips Kamel Mashhad	12	0	2	10	20	50	-30	5	-
Second Group	1	Peykan Tehran	12	11	0	1	51	14	+37	33	Promotion to the playoffs
Second Group	2	Nasr Fardis Karaj	12	9	1	2	81	19	+62	28	Promotion to the playoffs
Second Group	3	Meli Hafari Ahvaz	12	8	0	4	42	24	+18	24	Promotion to the playoffs
Second Group	4	Mes Rafsanjan	12	6	1	5	36	21	+15	19	Promotion to the playoffs
Second Group	5	Kimia Esfarayen	12	3	1	8	24	69	-45	10	-
Second Group	6	Parsara Shiraz	12	1	2	9	24	73	-49	6	-
Second Group	7	Heyat Football Isfahan	12	1	1	10	20	58	-38	4	-

Rules for classification:

1) Points; 2) Head-to-head points; 3) Goal difference; 4) Goals scored 5) Fair play points

(Note: Head-to-head record is used only after all the matches between the teams in question have been played).

Considerations:

- The top 4 teams of the first group and the top 4 teams of the second group qualified for the Iranian Women's Futsal Super League 2022.
- Teams 5 to 7 in the first group and the second group will participate in the Iranian Women's Futsal Premier League 2022.

== Quarter-finals ==
According to the instructions of the Women's Futsal Premier League competitions, the top 4 teams in each group will advance to the quarterfinals and then compete in the elimination games in the form of crosses. Palayesh Naft Abadan, Peykan Tehran and Nasr Fardis Karaj had an early advance to the quarterfinals five weeks before the end of the preliminary stage. One week before the end of the group stage competitions, the tasks of the other five teams that advanced to the elimination stage were determined so that the quarter-final stage table could be arranged with the presence of the top 8 teams in the group stage.

=== 1st leg ===
The quarter-final stage of the Iranian Women's Futsal Premier League was followed by the completion of two preparatory matches of the Iranian women's national futsal team against the Russian women's national futsal team, and four matches were held simultaneously on March 4.

4 March 2022	Mes Rafsanjan	2-0	Palayesh Naft Abadan	Rafsanjan
11 o'clock	Mahsa Kamali			Stadium: Payamnour Hall

4 March 2022	Meli Hafari Ahvaz	1-2	Buta Plus Iranian	Ahvaz
11 o'clock	Fatemeh Papi		Elham Asgari Nasrin Ghomi	Stadium: Emamreza Hall

4 March 2022	Poyandegan Sanaat Fajr Shiraz	0-8	Peykan Tehran	Shiraz
11 o'clock			Sahar Zamani Nasimeh Gholami Fatemeh Rahmati Fereshteh Khosravi Yasaman Pakju Sepideh Zarinrad	Stadium: Abolfathi Hall

4 March 2022	Farhan Malard	1-3	Nasr Fardis Karaj	Malard
11 o'clock	Leyla Zavar		Mahtab Banaei Sara Shirbeigi Nastaran Moghimi	Stadium: Fajrshahrdari Hall

=== 2nd leg ===
The case of the quarter-final stage of the return round of the Iranian Women's Futsal Premier League was closed on March 11 with 4 matches.

11 March 2022	Palayesh Naft Abadan	3-6	Mes Rafsanjan	Abadan
11 o'clock	Soheila Malmoli Fahimeh Zarei		Zahra Ahmmadzade Mohadese Mohammadi Samira Ghorbanpour Fatemeh Hosseini	Stadium: 17 Shahrivar Hall
Note: In total, 3-8 in favor of Mes Rafsanjan

11 March 2022	Buta Plus Iranian	3-5	Meli Hafari Ahvaz	Karaj
11 o'clock	Zeinab Mehrkhani Neda Nourverdi		Sahar Papi Fatemeh Papi Zeinab Mirrezaei Zahra Asadi	Stadium: Enghelab Hall
Note: In total, 6-5 in favor of Meli Hafari Ahvaz

11 March 2022	Peykan Tehran	6-1	Poyandegan Sanaat Fajr Shiraz	Tehran
11 o'clock	Sepideh Zarinrad Sahar Zamani Yasaman Pakju		Sanaz Basti	Stadium: Al-Ghadir Hall
Note: In total, 14-1 in favor of Peykan Tehran

11 March 2022	Nasr Fardis Karaj	5-0	Farhan Malard	Karaj
11 o'clock	Sara Shirbeigi Nastaran Moghimi Maral Torkaman			Stadium: Sarhadabad Hall
Note: In total, 8-1 in favor of Nasr Fardis Karaj

== Semi-finals ==
The teams Mes Rafsanjan, Meli Hafari Ahvaz, Peykan Tehran and Nasr Fardis Karaj in total, the results of the quarter-final stage were able to obtain a permit to participate in the semi-final stage. The schedule of the semi-final stage was determined according to the competition instructions.

=== 1st leg ===
With the planning of the league organization before Nowruz 1401, the first round of the semi-final stage was held, in which the teams of Nasr Fardis Karaj and Peykan Tehran were able to win at the rivals' house.

16 March 2022	Meli Hafari Ahvaz	2-5	Nasr Fardis Karaj	Ahvaz
11 o'clock	Fatemeh Khorang Sahar Papi		Nastaran Moghimi Fatemeh Tarahi Sara Shirbeigi Maral Torkaman	Stadium: Emamreza Hall

16 March 2022	Mes Rafsanjan	0-1	Peykan Tehran	Rafsanjan
11 o'clock			Fatemeh Rahmati	Stadium: Payamnour Hall

=== 2nd leg ===
With the beginning of the new year, the Women's Futsal League competitions resumed and the return matches were held. Finally, the Nasr Fardis Karaj and Peykan Tehran teams were able to reach the final by defeating Meli Hafari Ahvaz and Mes Rafsanjan.

30 March 2022	Nasr Fardis Karaj	5-0	Meli Hafari Ahvaz	Karaj
11 o'clock	Mahtab Banaei Sara Shirbeigi Maral Torkaman			Stadium: Sarhadabad Hall

30 March 2022	Peykan Tehran	1-1	Mes Rafsanjan	Tehran
11 o'clock	Ziba Afroogh		Mahsa Kamali	Stadium: Al-Ghadir Hall

== Final ==
By holding the semi-final matches, the task of the third joint team and the two teams that made it to the finals of the tournament was determined. The teams of Meli Hafari Ahvaz and Mes Rafsanjan jointly won the third title of this competition, and the teams of Nasr Fardis Karaj and Peykan Tehran were able to obtain a license to participate in the final competitions.

=== 1st leg ===
Due to the milder victory of Peykan Tehran compared to Nasr Fardis Karaj in the semi-finals, Peykan hosted the final round match and this match was hosted by Al-Ghadir Hall on April 8, and at the end of an interesting and close match, the two teams They agreed to a draw.

8 April 2022	Peykan Tehran	1-1	Nasr Fardis Karaj	Tehran
21:30 o'clock	Fatemeh Etedadi		Nastaran Moghimi	Stadium: Al-Ghadir Hall

=== 2nd leg ===
The last match of the 17th season of the Women's Futsal Premier League was held on the evening of April 17 at the Sarhadabad Hall in Karaj, and the Peykan Tehran women's futsal team won the league title by presenting an offensive performance.

15 April 2022	Nasr Fardis Karaj	0-1	Peykan Tehran	Karaj
21:30 o'clock			Arezoo Sadaghiani Zade (o.g.)	Stadium: Sarhadabad Hall

== Top scorers ==
Maral Torkaman, a young and 19-year-old phenomenon of Iranian women's futsal, was able to score 19 goals with the uniform of Nasr Fardis Karaj women's futsal team and became the top female goal scorer of the 17th season of the Iranian Women's Futsal Premier League.

Name	Team	Goals scored
Maral Torkaman	Nasr Fardis Karaj	19
Farideh Rahi	Heyat Football Roodan	18
Sara Shirbeigi	Nasr Fardis Karaj	17
Nastaran Moghimi	Nasr Fardis Karaj	17
Fatemeh Arzhangi	Buta Plus Iranian	16
Sahar Papi	Meli Hafari Ahvaz	16
Sahar Zamani	Peykan Tehran	15
Nesa Ahadi	Nasr Fardis Karaj	13
Nasim Navazande	Farhan Malard	13
Masoumeh Mohammad Ganji	Palayesh Naft Abadan	11
Elham Anafjeh	Nasr Fardis Karaj	11
Maryam Nouri	Palayesh Naft Abadan	11
Nasimeh Gholami	Peykan Tehran	11
