= Niloofar Ardalan =

Iranian footballer (born 1985)

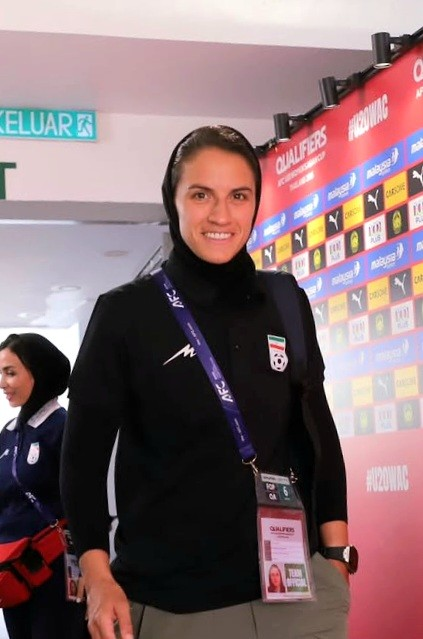

Personal information
- Date of birth: 29 May 1985 (age 41)
- Place of birth: Tehran, Iran
- Height: 1.72 m (5 ft 8 in)
- Positions: Pivot (futsal); winger

Team information
- Current team: Persepolis F.C. (Manager)

Senior career*
Years	Team	Apps	(Gls)
2008–2010	Rah Ahan		
2010–2012	Bandar Abbas Tejarat Khane		
2013–2016	Persepolis		
2016–2018	Islamic Azad University		

International career
2006–2011	Iran		
2012–2018	Iran (futsal)		

Managerial career
- 2018–2019: Iranian women's under-14 national football team (Assistant)
- 2019: Iranian women's under-16 national football team (Assistant)
- 2019–2020: Saipa women's futsal team
- 2019–2021: Iran's national women's under-20 futsal team
- 2021–2023: Peykan women's futsal team
- 2023-: Sepahan Isfahan women's football team
- * Club domestic league appearances and goals

Niloofar Ardalan (born 29 May 1985), also known as Niloofar Ardallani, is an Iranian coach and former player of football and futsal who played in the Iranian women's national football team and the Iranian women's national futsal team and was captain in both teams. She played for the Rah Ahan Football Club team as well as the Futsal Clubs teams of Tejarat Khane Bandar Abbas, Persepolis, and the Islamic Azad University of Tehran.

Ardalan missed the 2015 AFC Women's Futsal Championship due to her husband's opposition for travel. This turned into a controversial topic by the media. With numerous follow-ups and finally ordered a permit by the Iranian Attorney General, Ardalan managed to travel with the national team to the 2015 Women's World Futsal Championship in Guatemala.

During her playtime in the Iranian Women's Futsal Premier League, Ardalan won five championships. In 2017, Ardalan retired as a player and officially entered the field of coaching.

== Personal life ==
She is the daughter of Esmail Ardalan, the former goalkeeper of the Ekbatan Football Club (Tehran). She was born in Tehran and lives in this city and has a sister. Her husband, Mehdi Toutounchi, was the host of a sports entertainment program (Lezatefootball (The Pleasure of Football)) on the IRIB Varzesh (national sports TV channel). After being forbidden by her husband from leaving the country to attend the 2015 AFC Women's Futsal Asian Cup in Malaysia, Ardalan filed for divorce, and the divorce was eventually granted. Ardalan went to court, and the judge allowed her to go to the World Tournament, held in Guatemala. In 2015, she was listed as one of BBC's 100 Women. Ardalan has a son named as Radan.

== Club career ==
=== Rah Ahan Tehran Football Club ===
Ardalan began her professional football career at the Rah Ahan Tehran F.C.

=== Bandar Abbas Tejarat Khane Futsal Club ===
The first club experience in futsal of Ardalan occurred in Bandar Abbas. Following her shining and starry times in the football arena, she decided to start playing in futsal clubs. In the first step, she came to an agreement with the managers of Bandar Abbas Tejarat Khane F.S.C. to officially start her futsal activity. The presence of Shahrzad Mozaffar, the head coach of Iran Futsal, in this team and the stars who were determined to make history for Iranian women's futsal at the national levels, encouraged and persuaded Ardalan to reach an agreement with this team from Hormozgan Province.

She played two seasons in this team, and won the Iranian Women's Futsal Premier League title.

=== Persepolis Tehran F.S.C. ===
From her childhood, Ardalan had a special interest in Persepolis and ultimately she succeeded to realize her childhood dream in the early 2010s. In the short time that Persepolis Club entered the field of team management in women's futsal, she played with the Persepolis shirt for three seasons. Although she failed to win the league championship title with the Persepolis team, she won the runner-up title and third place in the league during her time with the Reds to continue her good days in futsal, and at the same time, she turned into one of the key members of the Iran women's national futsal team.

=== The Islamic Azad University of Tehran F.S.C. ===
The presence of Shahrzad Mozaffar, the successful head coach of the Iranian women's national futsal team, and no restriction on employing national players in a Premier League team gave an opportunity to Ardalan to cooperate with Muzaffar in the club arena. She played for the Islamic Azad University of Tehran F.S.C. along with stars such as Fereshteh Karimi.

== International career ==
Ardalan participated in the Asian Indoor Tournament hosted by South Korea in 2012 with the Iran women's national futsal team. In that tournament, the Iranian women's national futsal team won the runner-up title.

She participated in two tournaments of the World Women's Futsal Championship, with the Iranian national women's futsal team. In the 2012 Women's Futsal World Tournament, the Iranian national team reached seventh place, and in the 2013 World Futsal Championship in Spain, the Iranian national team stood in fifth place in the world.

Niloofar Ardalan has earned notable honors at the national level in both football and futsal. She was part of the Iranian women’s national football team that finished as runner-up in the West Asian Women’s Soccer Tournament in Jordan, achieved seventh place in the World Student Football Tournament in Brazil, and secured seventh place in the Women’s Futsal World Cup in Guatemala. Ardalan played a significant role in these national achievements.

== International goals ==
No.	Date	Venue	Opponent	Score	Result	Competition
1.	6 October 2011	Zayed Sports City Stadium, Abu Dhabi, UAE	United Arab Emirates	2–1	4–1	2011 WAFF Women's Championship

== Retirement ==
After Ardalan could not accompany the Iranian women's national futsal team to the 2015 Asian Cup in Malaysia due to her husband's opposition ‌to her travel, she stopped playing and began a coaching career. At that time, the interference of different bodies with the issue and supporting her and solving Ardalan's problem for the trip to the World Futsal Championship in Guatemala in 2017, persuaded her to temporarily leave the decision to say goodbye; however, at the end of 2017, she went low-key after her decision for leaving the world of football and futsal as a player and began her career in the field of coaching.

== Managerial career ==
=== The beginning of coaching in football ===
She was one of the figures who entered the pool of coaches so soon after leaving her player career and began her efforts to take and pass coaching classes. Ardalan managed pretty soon to climb the coaching promotion ladder in both football and futsal fields. Accordingly, she obtained the A Asian Football Coach Certificate and the Asian Futsal Level 1 Coaching Certificate. Working as a coach and assistant in the Iranian women's under-14 national football team was her first football experience as a coach. In the Central Asian Women's Football Association Tournament (CAFA), she could win the first honor of her coaching career with the young national player girls as the Iranian team gained in third place.

Ardalan started work as a coach in the Iranian women's under-16 national football team. With this team, she attended the Central Asian Women's Football Association (CAFA) Tournament and the Iranian girls finished as runner-ups.

=== Futsal coaching ===
The shining and successful start at coaching in football brought several offers to Ardalan for continuing her work in the field of coaching. Ultimately, she decided to pursue her career in the Saipa women's futsal team and officially took a step in her first head coaching experience, which was prominently successful and led her to win the runner-up title in her first year of presence in the Iran Women's Futsal Premier League as a head coach, while she lost the championship cup in the final match.

After spending a successful half-season in Saipa, an offer was made by the Iranian Football Federation at the same time of working as the head coach of the Saipa club to work as the head coach of Iran's national women's under-20 futsal team; ‌Niloofar Ardalan welcomed this opportunity and her first cup was won in the role of the head coach with the Iranian women's under-20 national futsal team in the Central Asian Women's Futsal Tournament.

=== Academic activities and sports talent detection ===
After the end of the 2019–2020 season, Niloofar Ardalan decided to leave Saipa and the conditions of the Coronavirus pandemic made the closure of the national team camps. This event led Ardalan, considered the founder of the first permanent women's football academy in Iran, to invest the majority of her activities in the area of the academy and seek to discover new talents.

However, Ardalan had received an offer to continue her coaching career abroad and had initiated negotiations with the officials of the Kuwaiti Al-Arabi team. But this transfer did not happen due to the conditions caused by the COVID-19 pandemic and she could not follow her job as a Legionnaire head coach.

=== Controversial events ===
After the occurrence of controversial events for Niloofar Ardalan in leaving the country with the Iranian women's national futsal team and her husband's refusal to allow her to leave the country, many domestic and foreign press and media dramatically focused on this issue and scrutinized it. Meanwhile, the relevant bodies and agencies took action with the follow-ups by the Football Federation so that Ardalan could accompany the national team in the next tournaments. Also in 2017, the movie "Cold Sweat", directed and written by Soheil Beiraghi, was made based on the story and events that happened to Niloofar Ardalan, which was also screened at the 36th Fajr Film Festival. Baran Kowsari, who played a role similar to Niloofar Ardalan, could win the honorary diploma of the best actress of the festival.

=== The history is repeated after 6 years ===
After what happened to Niloofar Ardalan on her trip to the AFC Asian Cup in Malaysia, in early 2021, Samira Zargari, the head coach of the Iran national alpine ski team, realized that she has been banned from leaving Iran by her husband and is not allowed to leave Iran with the Iran national team to attend the World Championship in Italy. This issue caused the issue of Ardalan's exit ban to be raised again in the media after six years and come to the focus of attention in the press. At the same time, Ardalan also supported Zargari in the matter and posted messages on her personal page pointing out the legal weaknesses concerning women's rights.

== Media activities ==
Outside of football, Ardalan pursued some activities in the field of media as well. She attended as an expert and referee in the first episode of Ms. Reporter Show, which was hosted by the Tamasha website and supported by the Varzesh3 website. In addition, she experienced a short-term presence as a presenter in the IRIB TV2 and the Varzesh Az Negah 2 TV Show to do some activities in the media space as well.

== Honours ==
=== Player ===
==== Club ====
- Winning the Iranian Women's Futsal Premier League with Bandar Abbas Tejarat Khane Futsal Club
- Winning the Iranian Women's Futsal Premier League with The Islamic Azad University of Tehran F.S.C.
- Third place in the women's soccer competitions of Islamic countries with the Rah Ahan Tehran F.C.

==== National ====
- Runner-up in 2007 WAFF Women's Championship (hosted by Jordan)
- Runner-up in the 2012 Asian Women's Futsal Championship (hosted by South Korea)

=== Coaching ===
==== Club ====
- Winning the 2021 Iranian Women's Futsal Premier League with Peykan Tehran
- Winning the 2022 Iranian Women's Futsal Super league with Peykan Tehran

==== National ====
- Winning the Cafa Women's Futsal Championship with the Iranian Women's Under-20 National Futsal Team
