= Sara Hassanin =

Egyptian football player and manager

Personal information
- Full name: Sara Mohamed Ahmed Hassanin
- Date of birth: 1982 or 1983
- Place of birth: Egypt
- Position: Left attacking midfielder

Senior career*
Years	Team	Apps	(Gls)
- El-Maaden
- Abu Dhabi

International career^{‡}
- Egypt
2011	United Arab Emirates	2+	(1)
- * Club domestic league appearances and goals ‡ National team caps and goals as of 12 October 2011

Sara Hassanin (Arabic: سارة حسنين, born 1982 or 1983) is an Egyptian football manager and former player. She played as a left attacking midfielder and has been a member of the Egypt women's national team.

== Club career ==
Hassanin has played for El-Maaden SC in Egypt and for Abu Dhabi Country Club in the United Arab Emirates.

== International career ==
Hassanin capped for Egypt at senior level during the 1998 African Women's Championship.

=== International goals ===
Scores and results list United Arab Emirates goal tally first

No.	Date	Venue	Opponent	Score	Result	Competition	Ref.
1	8 October 2011	Zayed Bin Sultan Stadium, Abu Dhabi, United Arab Emirates	Lebanon	1–0	5–0	2011 WAFF Women's Championship	
