= Shahad Budebs =

Emirati association football player (born 1994)

Personal information
- Full name: Shahad Jassem Abdulla Ali Budebs
- Date of birth: 24 August 1994 (age 32)
- Place of birth: Dubai, United Arab Emirates
- Position: Midfielder

Senior career*
Years	Team	Apps	(Gls)
- Abu Dhabi Country Club

International career^{‡}
2017	United Arab Emirates	5	(1)
- * Club domestic league appearances and goals ‡ National team caps and goals as of 12 April 2017

Shahad Jassem Abdulla Ali Budebs (Arabic: شهد بودبس; born 24 August 1994) is an Emirati association football player who plays as a midfielder.

== International goal ==
Scores and results list United Arab Emirates' goal tally first.

No.	Date	Venue	Opponent	Score	Result	Tournament
1.	7 April 2017	Pamir Stadium, Dushanbe, Tajikistan	Bahrain	1–0	1–1	2018 AFC Women's Asian Cup qualification
