= Iranian Women's Futsal Premier League =

Iranian Women's Futsal Premier League لیگ برتر فوتسال زنان ایران
- Founded: 2003
- Country: Iran
- Confederation: AFC
- Number of clubs: 14
- Current champions: Peykan Tehran
- Current: Iranian Women's Futsal Premier League 2021

Iranian Women's Futsal League competitions are the highest level of women's futsal club competitions in Iran. The first round of the Women's Premier League was held in 2005.

The first division of the country's women's football league was planned with the presence of 8 teams from the second half of 2003. Before that, the country's women's futsal competitions were held. In the 2003 women's futsal tournament, the four teams of Esteghlal Tehran, Deyhim Ahvaz Municipality, Payam Noavaran Nowshahr and Tejaratkhaneh-e-Junub met in the final stage in May 2003 at the Azadi Complex Women's Sports Hall to win the championship.

== History of Iranian Women's Futsal League ==
=== Before the start of the Futsal Premier League ===
In the first stage of the indoor soccer competitions of the first division of the country's clubs, in April 2003, the team of South Hormozgan Trading House became the champion. These competitions were held in the presence of 4 teams from Peykan Tehran, Southern Chamber of Commerce, Ahvaz Municipality and Kermanshah Industry in Bandar Abbas Medical Sciences Hall.

=== Women's Futsal Premier League ===
Period	Season	Champion	Runner-up	Third place
1	2005	Rahahan Tehran	Payam Noavaran Nowshahr	Deyhim Ahvaz
2	2006	Tejaratkhaneh Hormozgan	Esteghlal Jonoub Dezful	Islamic Azad university
3	2007	Esteghlal Jonoub Dezful	Tejaratkhaneh Hormozgan	
4	2008	Rahahan Tehran	Tejaratkhaneh Hormozgan	Persepolis Tehran
5	2009	Tejaratkhaneh Hormozgan	Arash Bandarabbas	Malavan Javan Rasht
6	2010	Tejaratkhaneh Hormozgan	Meli Hafari Ahvaz	Hejab Ghazvin
7	2011	Isar Persepolis Tehran	Hejab Ghazvin	Meli Hafari Ahvaz
8	2012	Meli Hafari Ahvaz	Persepolis Tehran	Matin Varamin
9	2013	Meli Hafari Ahvaz	Palayesh Naft Abadan	Persepolis Tehran
10	2014	Meli Hafari Ahvaz	Sepidrood Rasht	Islamic Azad university
11	2015	Islamic Azad university	Meli Hafari Ahvaz	Taavoni Ahrar Rasht
12	2016	Meli Hafari Ahvaz	Islamic Azad university	Palayesh Naft Abadan
13	2017	Palayesh Naft Abadan	Meli Hafari Ahvaz	Islamic Azad university
14	2018	Namino Isfahan	Mes Rafsanjan	Meli Hafari Ahvaz
15	2019	Mes Rafsanjan	Saipa Tehran	Meli Hafari Ahvaz / Heyat Football Khorasan Razavi
16	2020	Palayesh Naft Abadan	Saipa Tehran	Heyat Football Khorasan Razavi
17	2021	Peykan Tehran	Nasr Fardis Karaj	Meli Hafari Ahvaz / Mes Rafsanjan
