= Nasr Fardis Karaj women's futsal team =

Nasr Fardis Karaj نصر فردیس کرج
- Full name: Nasr Fardis Karaj Women's Futsal Team
- Founded: 2020; 2 years ago
- Ground: Sarhadabad Martyrs Hall, Fardis
- Chairman: Majid Ramezani
- Head Coach: Fatemeh Sharif
- League: Iranian Women's Futsal Premier League
Home colours	Away colours	Third colours

Nasr Ferdis Karaj Futsal Team is an Iranian futsal team that is currently in the Iranian Women's Futsal Premier League; In the 2020 season, this team was able to obtain a license to advance to the Premier League from the first division of the Iranian Women's Futsal League.

Nasr Ferdis Karaj participated in the first division league competitions in a situation where the technical management of this team was under the responsibility of Mohammad Golzadeh; But after advancing to the Premier League, with the decision of the board and the managing director of the club, Masoumeh Rezazadeh took the helm of the Nasr Ferdis Karaj women's futsal team.

While five weeks had passed since the league competitions, Rezazadeh resigned due to serious differences between the staff and the club's management, and Fatemeh Sharif was introduced as the new head coach of the team.

This team is in the second group of the preliminary stage of the 2021 season women's futsal premier league with Saipa Tehran, Meli Hafari Ahvaz, Mes Rafsanjan, Peykan Tehran, Pars Ara Shiraz, Kimia Esfarayen and Heyat Football Isfahan.

== Overall performance ==
The table below shows the performance of the women's futsal team in various competitions.

Season	League	Place	Description
2020	Iranian Women's Futsal First Division League	Championship	Promotion to the Premier League
2021	Iranian Women's Futsal Premier League	Runner-up	
