= Peykan Tehran women's futsal team =

Peykan Tehran پیکان تهران
- Full name: Peykan Tehran women's futsal team
- Founded: 2021; 4 years ago
- Ground: Al-Ghadir Hall, Tehran
- Chairman: Amir Atabakhsh
- Head Coach: Niloofar Ardalan
- League: Iranian Women's Futsal Premier League
Home colours	Away colours	Third colours

Peykan Tehran Futsal Team is an Iranian futsal team that is currently in the Iranian Women's Futsal Premier League; This team bought the points of Rahyab Gostar Tehran team to participate in the competitions of the Women's Futsal Premier League in the 2021 season.

Paykan Tehran Sports Club had a team in men's football and women's volleyball. Under the management of Akbar Mohammadi, they decided to take part in the first level of women's futsal and took the first step in the field of women's futsal team by buying points.

This team is in the second group of the preliminary stage of the 2021 season women's futsal premier league with Saipa Tehran, Meli Hafari Ahvaz, Mes Rafsanjan, Nasr Fardis Karaj, Pars Ara Shiraz, Kimia Esfarayen and Heyat Football Isfahan

== Overall performance ==
The table below shows the performance of the women's futsal team in various competitions.

Season	League	Place	Description
2021	Iranian Women's Futsal Premier League	Championship	Participated in the competitions by purchasing Rahyab Gostar Tehran points

== Staff ==
After buying points to participate in the Iranian Women's Futsal Premier League, Akbar Mohammadi, CEO of Peykan Tehran Club, with the support of Iran Khodro Factory to build a strong team, negotiated with several options for coaching the team. Finally, with the proposal of the technical committee and the approval of the board of directors of Peykan Club, Niloofar Ardalan was selected as the head coach of the women's futsal team of this club in the new season of the Premier League competitions.
