= Koueistan Khosravi =

Iranian footballer (born 1986)

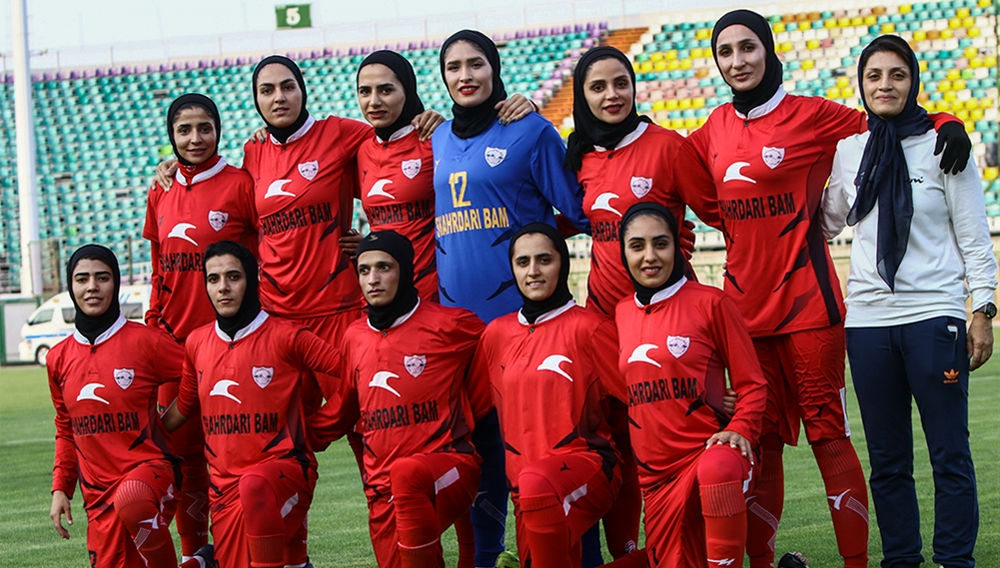
- Koueistan Khosravi is the second person standing from the right in the championship celebration of Bam Municipality team

Personal information
- Full name: Koueistan Khosravi
- Date of birth: 24 November 1986 (age 39)
- Place of birth: Saqqez, Iran
- Position: Defender

Team information
- Current team: Shahrdari Bam
- Number: 3

Senior career*
| Years | Team | Apps | (Gls) |
- Shahrdari Bam

International career^{‡}
| 2009–2017 | Iran | 10 | (0) |
- * Club domestic league appearances and goals ‡ National team caps and goals as of 13 November 2018

Koueistan Khosravi (Persian: کویستان خسروی; born 24 November 1986) is an Iranian footballer who plays as a defender for Kowsar Women Football League club FC Shahrdari Bam. She has been a member of the senior Iran women's national team.
