= Sara Ghomi =

Iranian footballer

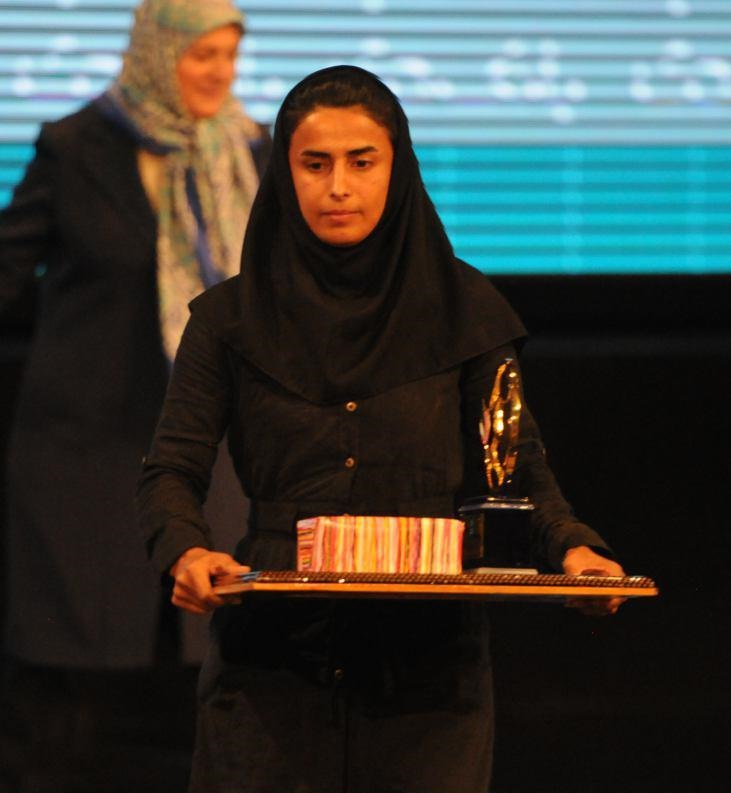

Personal information
- Full name: Sara Ghomi Marzdashti
- Date of birth: 20 August 1987 (age 39)
- Place of birth: Khomam, Rasht, Iran
- Height: 1.58 m (5 ft 2 in)
- Position: Striker

Team information
- Current team: H.F. Alborz
- Number: 99

Senior career*
Years	Team	Apps	(Gls)
2006–2016	Malavan	126	(208)
2016	Zir fani	4	(9)
2016–	Shahrdari Bam	18	(11)

International career
2012–	Iran	34	(10)
- * Club domestic league appearances and goals as of 12 May 2019

Sara Ghomi Marzdashti (Persian: سارا قمی مرزدشتی; born 20 August 1987), is an Iranian footballer who plays as a forward for Heyat Football Alborz team and the Iranian national team.

She started her football career in 2005 with Malavan Bandar Anzali club. She played for the Malavan team until late 2015, when the women's team of Malavan was disbanded. Through her years at Malavan, she was chosen as the top goalscorer of Iran's premier league five times. She is the most prolific Iranian female footballer of all time, having scored 238 goals.

== Early life ==
Ghomi was interested in football from a very young age, but since women's football was not activated in Iran, she started playing volleyball. In 1999–2000 after discovering there was a women's futsal team in her region of Rasht, Gilan province, she focused on futsal and dropped volleyball.

In early 2005, Malavan's women's team was founded, and Ghomi joined the club after passing the entrance test. She played for Malavan for about 11 years until the team was disbanded. Ghomi stated in an interview that the resolution of the Malavan women's team broke her heart.

== International career ==
Due to her goal-scoring skills, she was first invited to the national team in 2012. Even though her main position is forward, for the national team, she plays as a left midfielder.

== International goals ==
No.	Date	Venue	Opponent	Score	Result	Competition
1.	4 October 2011	Zayed Bin Sultan Stadium, Abu Dhabi, UAE	Lebanon	2–1	8–1	2011 WAFF Women's Championship
2.	4 October 2011	Zayed Bin Sultan Stadium, Abu Dhabi, UAE	Lebanon	5–1	8–1	2011 WAFF Women's Championship
3.	6 October 2011	Zayed Bin Sultan Stadium, Abu Dhabi, UAE	United Arab Emirates	4–1	4–1	2011 WAFF Women's Championship
4.	25 May 2013	Bangabandhu National Stadium, Dhaka, Bangladesh	Thailand	1–4	1–5	2014 AFC Women's Asian Cup qualification
5.	5 April 2017	Vietnam YFT Center, Hanoi, Vietnam	Singapore	2–0	6–0	2018 AFC Women's Asian Cup qualification
6.	5 April 2017	Vietnam YFT Center, Hanoi, Vietnam	Singapore	3–0	6–0	2018 AFC Women's Asian Cup qualification
7.	11 April 2017	Vietnam YFT Center, Hanoi, Vietnam	Syria	12–0	12–0	2018 AFC Women's Asian Cup qualification
8.	6 April 2019	Saoud bin Abdulrahman Stadium, Al Wakrah, Qatar	Palestine	6–0	9–0	2020 AFC Women's Olympic Qualifying Tournament
9.	6 April 2019	Saoud bin Abdulrahman Stadium, Al Wakrah, Qatar	Palestine	9–0	9–0	2020 AFC Women's Olympic Qualifying Tournament

== Career statistics ==
=== Club ===
Club	Division	Season	League		Total	
Club	Division	Season	Apps	Goals	Apps	Goals
Malavan	Pro League	2009-10	8	26	8	26
Malavan	Pro League	2011-12	18	47	18	47
Malavan	Pro League	2013–14	21	35	21	35
Malavan	Pro League	2014–15	18	37	18	37
Malavan	Pro League	2015–16	16	24	16	24
Malavan	Pro League	2017-18	20	33	20	33
Malavan	Pro League	2024-25	9	5	9	5
Malavan	Pro League	2025-26	6	2	6	2
Malavan	Total		116	209	116	209
Zir Fani	Iraq women league	2016	4	9	4	9
Shahrdari Bam	Pro League	2016–17	4	5	4	5
Paykam Teheran	Pro League	2023-24	7	8	7	8
Career total			131	231	131	231

== Honours ==
=== Club ===
Malavan Bandar Anzali

- Kowsar Women Football League:

runner-up 2012–13, runner-up 2013–14, runner-up 2014–15, runner-up 2015–16

Shahrdari Bam

- Kowsar Women Football League:

runner-up 2016–17

=== Individual ===
Kowsar Women Football League

- Top Goalscorer:

5 times (2009-10, 2011–12, 2013–14, 2014–15 and 2015–16).

== Personal life ==
Ghomi is a fan of Barcelona S.C. and Messi. Ali Karimi is her favourite footballer in Iran. In an interview, she said when she was a kid she wanted to be a sport teacher, but now she prefers not to be since she is a professional footballer now.
