= Phoebe Licence =

Bahranian women's footballer

Personal information
- Full name: Phoebe Victoria Licence
- Date of birth: 20 August 1999 (age 27)
- Place of birth: Manama, Bahrain
- Height: 1.70 m (5 ft 7 in)
- Position: Midfielder

Team information
- Current team: Flagler Saints
- Number: 12

College career
| Years | Team | Apps | (Gls) |
| 2017–2018 | Barry Buccaneers | 12 | (2) |
| 2020– | Flagler Saints | 40 | (1) |

Senior career*
| Years | Team | Apps | (Gls) |
| 2015–2017 | Exeter City | | |

International career^{‡}
| 2013– | Bahrain | 19 | (3) |
- * Club domestic league appearances and goals as of 6 December 2021 ‡ National team caps and goals as of 6 December 2021

Phoebe Victoria Licence (born 20 August 1999) is a professional footballer who plays as a midfielder for the American college soccer team Flagler Saints. She also played for Exeter City in England. Born in Bahrain to English parents, she represents the Bahrain national football team.

== Personal life ==
Licence was born in Manama, Bahrain to English parents Simon and Jane Licence. She has two older brothers, Seb and her twin brother William Licence, whom she credits for her passion for football. She graduated from King's College, Taunton.

== Club career ==
Licence has played for Exeter City women's football club in the FA Women's National League South West Division One.

== International career ==
Licence made her senior debut for Bahrain on 22 May 2013 in the 2014 AFC Women's Asian Cup qualification match against Vietnam. She participated in the 2019 WAFF Women's Championship held at Bahrain where she scored a goal in the group stage win against Lebanon.

== International goals ==
| No. | Date | Venue | Opponent | Score | Result | Competition |
|---|---|---|---|---|---|---|
| 1. | 20 February 2015 | Khalifa Sports City Stadium, Isa Town, Bahrain | Hong Kong | – | 2–4 | Friendly |
| 2. | 18 March 2015 | Paphos Stadium, Paphos, Cyprus | Lebanon | 3–1 | 3–1 | Aphrodite Women Cup |
| 3. | 7 January 2019 | Al Muharraq Stadium, Muharraq, Bahrain | Lebanon | 1–1 | 3–2 | 2019 WAFF Women's Championship |
