= Maryam Rahimi =

Iranian footballer (born 1994)

Personal information
- Full name: Maryam Rahimi
- Date of birth: 1994 (age 31–32)
- Place of birth: Gorgan, Iran
- Position: Forward

International career^{‡}
Years	Team	Apps	(Gls)
2009–	Iran	2	(2)
- ‡ National team caps and goals as of 11:39, 22 March 2015 (UTC)

Maryam Rahimi is an Iranian professional footballer who plays as a midfielder for the Iran women's national team.

== International goals ==
No.	Date	Venue	Opponent	Score	Result	Competition
1.	8 March 2011	Prince Mohammed Stadium, Zarqa, Jordan	Palestine	1–0	4–0	2012 Summer Olympics qualification
2.	8 March 2011	Prince Mohammed Stadium, Zarqa, Jordan	Palestine	2–0	4–0	2012 Summer Olympics qualification
3.	8 March 2011	Prince Mohammed Stadium, Zarqa, Jordan	Palestine	4–0	4–0	2012 Summer Olympics qualification
4.	12 March 2011	Prince Mohammed Stadium, Zarqa, Jordan	Bahrain	1–0	2–0	2012 Summer Olympics qualification
5.	12 March 2011	Prince Mohammed Stadium, Zarqa, Jordan	Bahrain	2–0	2–0	2012 Summer Olympics qualification
6.	4 October 2011	Zayed Bin Sultan Stadium, Abu Dhabi, UAE	Lebanon	3–1	8–1	2011 WAFF Women's Championship
7.	4 October 2011	Zayed Bin Sultan Stadium, Abu Dhabi, UAE	Lebanon	6–1	8–1	2011 WAFF Women's Championship
8.	6 October 2011	Zayed Bin Sultan Stadium, Abu Dhabi, UAE	United Arab Emirates	1–0	4–1	2011 WAFF Women's Championship
9.	6 October 2011	Zayed Bin Sultan Stadium, Abu Dhabi, UAE	United Arab Emirates	3–1	4–1	2011 WAFF Women's Championship
10.	10 October 2011	Zayed Bin Sultan Stadium, Abu Dhabi, UAE	Jordan	1–1	3–2	2011 WAFF Women's Championship
11.	10 October 2011	Zayed Bin Sultan Stadium, Abu Dhabi, UAE	Jordan	2–1	3–2	2011 WAFF Women's Championship
12.	10 October 2011	Zayed Bin Sultan Stadium, Abu Dhabi, UAE	Jordan	3–1	3–2	2011 WAFF Women's Championship
13.	12 October 2011	Zayed Bin Sultan Stadium, Abu Dhabi, UAE	United Arab Emirates	2–1	2–2 (5–6 p)	2011 WAFF Women's Championship
14.	23 May 2013	Bangabandhu National Stadium, Dhaka, Bangladesh	Bangladesh	1–0	2–0	2014 AFC Women's Asian Cup qualification
15.	23 May 2013	Bangabandhu National Stadium, Dhaka, Bangladesh	Bangladesh	2–0	2–0	2014 AFC Women's Asian Cup qualification
