= Deena Rahman =

Bahraini footballer

Personal information
- Full name: Deena Abdel Rahman
- Date of birth: 23 February 1983 (age 43)
- Place of birth: Fulham, England
- Position: Midfielder

Youth career
- Fulham
- Arsenal
- Fulham

Senior career*
Years	Team	Apps	(Gls)
1997–2006	Fulham		
2008	Wadi Degla		

International career^{‡}
1998–2002	England U19	18	
2011–	Bahrain	40	(23)
- * Club domestic league appearances and goals as of 13:45, 23 October 2021 (UTC) ‡ National team caps and goals as of 13:45, 23 October 2021 (UTC)

Deena Abdel Rahman (Arabic: دينا عبدالرحمن; born 23 February 1983) is a football coach and midfielder. She has represented the England women's national under-19 football team and the Bahrain women's national football team. At club level she was formerly a professional with Fulham.

== Club career ==
Rahman began playing football with Fulham at seven years old, initially as the only girl in the club's boys' youth system. When the women's and girls' section was reinstated shortly afterwards, she transferred to the female youth teams.

Following one season with the Arsenal Academy at the under-14 level, Rahman returned to Fulham and joined the first team squad. In 2000, when Fulham became the first full-time professional women's football club in Europe, Rahman was one of six existing players to be kept on.

She scored in a 7–1 win over Birmingham City in the 2001–02 final of the FA Women's Premier League Cup. Fulham signed a number of strong and experienced players which meant Rahman was not always first choice. She remained with the club after they lost their professional status in 2003, but she was disrupted by an ankle injury and then the club was disbanded altogether in 2006.

Rahman moved to Egypt at her father's suggestion and played for Wadi Degla for one year, before she sustained an anterior cruciate ligament injury and returned to England for treatment.

== International career ==
At 15 years old Rahman was called-up to the England women's national under-18 football team. She made her debut against the Netherlands in 1998 and went on to win 18 caps, playing in two editions of the UEFA Women's Under-19 Championship.

In 2011, Rahman agreed to switch her international eligibility to Bahrain women's national football team. She had trained with the team to regain her fitness after moving to the country the previous year. She was called-up for the WAFF Women's Championship in 2011.

By May 2017 Rahman had scored 23 goals in 40 appearances for Bahrain.

== International goals ==
No.	Date	Venue	Opponent	Score	Result	Competition
1.	3 October 2011	Zayed Bin Sultan Stadium, Abu Dhabi, United Arab Emirates	Iraq	9–0	12–0	2011 WAFF Women's Championship
2.	26 May 2013	Bahrain National Stadium, Riffa, Bahrain	Kyrgyzstan	1–0	4–1	2014 AFC Women's Asian Cup qualification
3.	26 May 2013	Bahrain National Stadium, Riffa, Bahrain	Kyrgyzstan	3–1	4–1	2014 AFC Women's Asian Cup qualification
4.	7 April 2017	Pamir Stadium, Dushanbe, Tajikistan	United Arab Emirates	1–1	1–1	2018 AFC Women's Asian Cup qualification
5.	12 April 2017	Pamir Stadium, Dushanbe, Tajikistan	Iraq	1–0	4–0	2018 AFC Women's Asian Cup qualification

== Personal life ==
Rahman was born in Fulham to an Egyptian father, Maher, and an English mother, Dawn. She was among the first female members of the Professional Footballers Association (PFA) and studied a Sports Science degree with their assistance.

In 2012 Rahman married Paul Shipwright. They have run a football coaching business, Tekkers Academy, in Bahrain since 2015. Rahman holds five Guinness World Records as a result of her charity work.

== Honours ==
Fulham

- FA Women's Premier League National Division: 2002–03
- FA Women's Premier League Southern Division: 2001–02
- South East Combination Women's Football League: 2000–01
- FA Women's Cup: 2001–02, 2002–03
- FA Women's Premier League Cup: 2001–02, 2002–03
