= Reem Al-Hashmi =

Bahraini footballer

Reem Al Hashmi
Personal information
- Full name: Reem Yusuf Masood Salem Al Hashmi
- Date of birth: 27 June 1987 (age 39)
- Place of birth: Muharraq, Bahrain
- Position: Forward

International career
Years	Team	Apps	(Gls)
2010–2019	Bahrain	15+	(21+)

Reem Yusuf Masood Salem Al Hashmi (Arabic: ريم يوسف مسعود سالم الهاشمي; born 27 June 1987) is a Bahraini footballer who plays as a forward for the Bahrain national team. She competed in the 2014 AFC Asian Cup qualification where she scored two goals against Kyrgyzstan.

== Career statistics ==
=== International ===
No.	Date	Venue	Opponent	Score	Result	Competition
1	24 May 2013	Bahrain National Stadium, Riffa, Bahrain	Hong Kong	1–0	1–3	2014 AFC Asian Cup qualification
2	26 May 2013	Bahrain National Stadium, Riffa, Bahrain	Kyrgyzstan	2–0	4–1	2014 AFC Asian Cup qualification
3	26 May 2013	Bahrain National Stadium, Riffa, Bahrain	Kyrgyzstan	4–1	4–1	2014 AFC Asian Cup qualification
4	5 April 2017	Pamir Stadium, Dushanbe, Tajikistan	Tajikistan	1–0	4–0	2018 AFC Asian Cup qualification
5	5 April 2017	Pamir Stadium, Dushanbe, Tajikistan	Tajikistan	2–0	4–0	2018 AFC Asian Cup qualification
6	5 April 2017	Pamir Stadium, Dushanbe, Tajikistan	Tajikistan	4–0	4–0	2018 AFC Asian Cup qualification
7	12 April 2017	Pamir Stadium, Dushanbe, Tajikistan	Iraq	1–0	4–0	2018 AFC Asian Cup qualification
