= Imen Troudi =

Tunisian footballer (born 1989)

Personal information
- Date of birth: 28 March 1989 (age 37)
- Place of birth: Tunisia
- Position: Midfielder

Team information
- Current team: Abu Dhabi Country

Senior career*
| Years | Team | Apps | (Gls) |
| 2005–2012 | Sahel | | |
| 2012 | Quebec City Amiral SC | | |
| 2017 | Stjarnan | 1 | (0) |
| 20??– | Abu Dhabi Country | | |

International career
- Tunisia
| 2011 | United Arab Emirates | 2+ | (2) |
- * Club domestic league appearances and goals

Imen Troudi (Arabic: إيمان الطرودي; born 28 March 1989) is a Tunisian footballer who plays as a midfielder for Emirati side Abu Dhabi Country Club and the Tunisia women's national team.

== Club career ==
Troudi has played for ASF Sahel in Tunisia, for Stjarnan in Iceland and for Abu Dhabi Country in the United Arab Emirates.

== International career ==
Troudi capped for Tunisia at senior level during the 2008 African Women's Championship qualification.

=== International goals ===
Scores and results list United Arab Emirates goal tally first

| No. | Date | Venue | Opponent | Score | Result | Competition | Ref. |
|---|---|---|---|---|---|---|---|
| 1 | 8 October 2011 | Zayed Bin Sultan Stadium, Abu Dhabi, United Arab Emirates | Lebanon | 4–0 | 5–0 | 2011 WAFF Women's Championship | |
| 2 | 10 October 2011 | Zayed Bin Sultan Stadium, Abu Dhabi, United Arab Emirates | Bahrain | 4–0 | 4–0 | 2011 WAFF Women's Championship | |

Scores and results list Tunisia goal tally first

| No. | Date | Venue | Opponent | Score | Result | Competition | Ref. |
|---|---|---|---|---|---|---|---|
| 1 | 6 October 2021 | Theyab Awana Stadium, Dubai, United Arab Emirates | United Arab Emirates | 1 | 4–0 | Friendly | |

== See also ==
- List of Tunisia women's international footballers
