= Oumayma Ben Maaouia =

Tunisian football player and manager

Personal information
- Place of birth: Tunisia
- Position: Midfielder

Senior career*
Years	Team	Apps	(Gls)
- TAC

International career^{‡}
2009–2014	Tunisia	4+	(0+)
2011	United Arab Emirates	1+	(1)
- * Club domestic league appearances and goals ‡ National team caps and goals as of 5 March 2016.

Oumayma Ben Maaouia (Arabic: أميمة بن معاوية), also known as Oumayma Maaouia (Arabic: أميمة معاوية), is a Tunisian former footballer and current manager. She played as a midfielder and has been a member of the Tunisia women's national team.

== Club career ==
Ben Maaouia has played for Tunis Air Club in Tunisia.

== International career ==
Ben Maaouia capped for Tunisia at senior level during two Africa Women Cup of Nations qualifications (2012 and 2014).

=== International goals ===
Scores and results list United Arab Emirates goal tally first

No.	Date	Venue	Opponent	Score	Result	Competition	Ref.
1	12 October 2011	Zayed Bin Sultan Stadium, Abu Dhabi, United Arab Emirates	Iran	1–1	2–2	2011 WAFF Women's Championship	

Scores and results list Tunisia goal tally first

No.	Date	Venue	Opponent	Score	Result	Competition	Ref.
1	12 May 2015	Stade El Menzah, Tunis, Tunisia	Egypt	2–?	2–0	Friendly	

== See also ==
- List of Tunisia women's international footballers
