= Yasmeen Fayez =

Bahraini footballer (born 1989)

Yasmeen Fayez Tobellah (Arabic: ياسمين فايز; born 17 September 1989) is a Bahraini footballer who plays as a midfielder for Al Nassr.

== Club career ==
Fayez played for Saudi Arabian side Al-Mamlaka, helping the club win the league. In 2022, she signed for Saudi Arabian side Al Nassr, becoming the first Bahraini female player to play professionally. She has been regarded as one of the club's most important players.

== International career ==
Fayez has captained the Bahrain women's national football team.

== Style of play ==
Fayez has been described as someone who "always excelled in the midfield".
