= Fatemeh Arjangi =

Iranian footballer

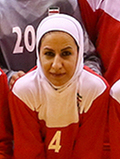

Personal information
- Full name: Fatemeh Arzhangi
- Position: Midfielder

International career^{‡}
Years	Team	Apps	(Gls)
2009	Iran	2	(0)
- Iran (futsal)
- ‡ National team caps and goals as of 8 July 2009

Fatemeh Arjangi (Persian: فاطمه ارژنگی) is an Iranian former footballer who played as a midfielder. She has been a member of the Iran women's national team.
