= Ouafae Nachâ =

Moroccan footballer (born 1983)

Personal information
- Date of birth: 7 August 1983 (age 43)
- Place of birth: Azrou, Morocco
- Position: Midfielder

Senior career*
Years	Team	Apps	(Gls)
- Khénifra
- Abu Dhabi

International career^{‡}
2008	Morocco	1+	(0+)
2011	United Arab Emirates	1+	(0)
- * Club domestic league appearances and goals ‡ National team caps and goals as of 6 October 2011.

Ouafae Nachâ is a Moroccan former footballer who played as a midfielder. She has been a member of the Morocco women's national team.

== Club career ==
Nachâ has played for CA Khénifra in Morocco and for Abu Dhabi Country Club in the United Arab Emirates.

== International career ==
Nachâ capped for Morocco at senior level on 8 March 2008 in a 0–6 friendly home lost to France.

== See also ==
- List of Morocco women's international footballers
