= GITEX Vietnam =

GITEX AI Vietnam
- Status: Upcoming
- Genre: Technology exhibition and conference
- Frequency: Annual
- Venue: (To be announced)
- Location: Hanoi
- Country: Vietnam
- Inaugurated: 1–2 October 2026
- Organiser: KAOUN International
- Website: https://gitexvietnam.com/

GITEX AI Vietnam is an upcoming technology exhibition and conference scheduled to take place in Hanoi, Vietnam, on 1–2 October 2026. The event is organised by KAOUN International in partnership with the Dubai World Trade Centre and the Vietnam National Innovation Center (NIC). It is part of the global GITEX network of technology exhibitions.

The event supported by Vietnam's Ministry of Finance and Ministry of Science and Technology.

== Activity ==
GITEX AI Vietnam was announced in 2025 as part of GITEX's expansion into Southeast Asia. Its launch coincides with Vietnam's National Innovation Week. Media reports linked to the announcement projected Vietnam's digital economy could reach around US$200 billion by 2030.

The event includes exhibitions, conferences, and networking sessions. Co-located platforms include AI Everything Vietnam, Startups North Star Vietnam, GITEX Cyber Valley Vietnam, and FDX Vietnam. Expected participants include policymakers, technology companies, startups, investors, and researchers.

== See also ==
- GITEX
- GITEX Asia
- Dubai World Trade Centre
