= Expand North Star =

Annual event in Dubai

- Status: Active
- Genre: Technology
- Venue: Dubai Harbour
- Locations: Dubai, United Arab Emirates
- Inaugurated: 2016
- Attendance: Annually
- Organizer: Dubai World Trade Center
- Website: www.expandnorthstar.com

Expand North Star, previously known as GITEX Future Stars, is an annual technology startup event in Dubai at the Dubai World Trade Center. Strategically a part of GITEX GLOBAL, North Star showcases startups in front of tech industry professionals from more than 100 countries worldwide.

The event also features multiple conferences across nine stages, including the 10x Stage, Pitch Stage, Spotlight Stage, Rising Stage, Marketing Mania, Creative Economy, Youth X, Blockchain Stage and Fintech Stage. The event also organizes a pitch competition by the name of Supernova Challenge with a cash prize of USD 200,000.

== History ==
North Star Dubai was started as GITEX Future Stars in 2016. It is being held annually along with the technology event GITEX in Dubai at the Dubai World Trade Centre.

In 2017, the event took place between October 8 to 12. Christopher Schroeder moderated several panels at the event.

The 2018 event took place from October 14 to 17. Etisalat launched innovation programme, "Future Now."

The 2019 event took place from October 6 to 9.

The 2020 event took place between December 6 to 10. It also held "Israel Innovation Discovery Day" on December 8 which featured investors and technology experts.

In 2021, the event was renamed from GITEX Future Stars to North Star Dubai and it took place from October 17 to 20. That year, "GITEX YouthX Unipreneur" was launched to showcase youth leadership initiatives and tech startups in the event. In 2021, Dubai World Trade Center announced that the GITEX Future Stars would be rebranded to North Star Dubai.

In 2022, along with GITEX Global (formerly known as GITEX), it took place from October 10 to 13. It also started a panel named "Africa Fast 100," for African tech start-ups.

The four-day 2024 event, named Expand North Star, will take place from October 13–16.
