= The Sons of Two Suns =

- The Sons of Two Suns Official Poster
- Directed by: S. A. Zaidi
- Written by: S. A. Zaidi
- Produced by: Ghanem Ghubash
- Starring: Saga Alyasery; Ana Druzhynina; Mohammad Abu Diak
- Cinematography: Ghanem Ghubash
- Edited by: Nina Sargsyan
- Music by: Tabraiz Haroon; Zeeshan Tahir; Jaxx Monteath
- Release date: April 2013 (Gulf Film Festival)
- Running time: 10 minutes
- Country: United Arab Emirates
- Languages: English; Arabic

The Sons of Two Suns is an Emirati post apocalyptic science fiction short film directed by S. A. Zaidi and produced by Ghanem Ghubash, it is known to be the first science fiction film of United Arab Emirates.

== Premise ==
During the end of the world, three friends struggle to survive in Dubai. They search for shelter in an empty city devastated by two suns on the horizon.

== Production ==
The film was entirely shot outdoors during the peak summer months in Dubai in order to achieve the desired effect created by natural sunlight and extreme heat in the city. Some of the crew were hospitalized due to heat stroke.

== Release ==
The films trailer premiered at the Middle East Film and Comic Con Dubai. The film was released at the Gulf Film Festival and had its US premiere at Boston Science Fiction Film Festival.

== Reception ==
io9 mentioned ″Short film "Sons of Two Suns" is being billed as the UAE's first science fiction film. It's about a city that's dying of heat, and you couldn't ask for a better landscape than Dubai to film in.″ Vice (magazine) found "Dubai's First Sci-Fi Film Is a Reminder That Dubai Itself Is Not Actually Science Fiction, now that the city has produced its own sci-fi film, a surprise post-apocalyptic vision of a city torn apart by the approach of two suns.″ Virgin.com said "the film is steeped in heavy yellow filters as we gaze in wonder at Dubai's decline. Although not all that cheery, the film looks at the three survivors, and gives us a harsh look, from a Dubai perspective, what things could be like!″.
