= Ashraf Ghori =

Indian filmmaker and artist

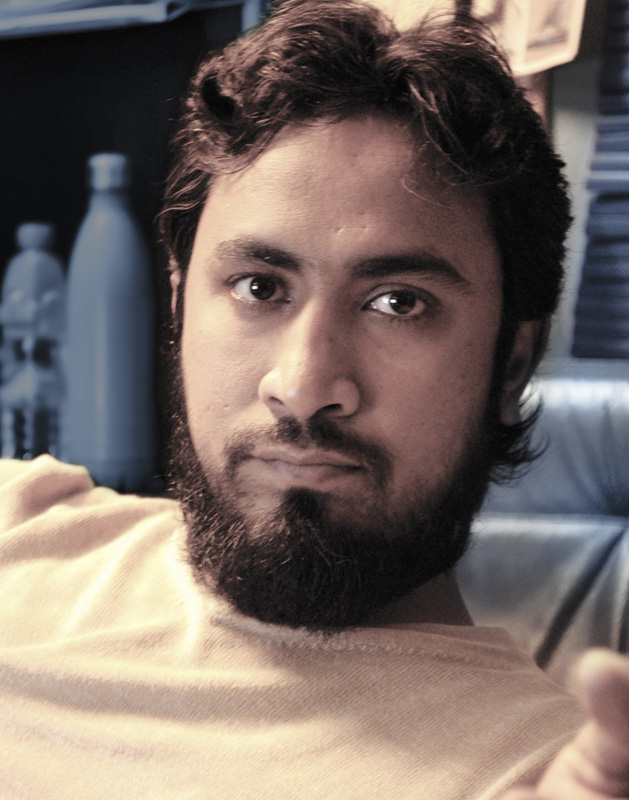
- Ashraf Ghori in Dubai, 2010
- Born: Mohammed Ashraf Ghori; 17 September 1973 (age 53) Hyderabad, India
- Areas: Filmmaker, director, comic book artist, entrepreneur, philanthropist
- Notable works: Xero Error, Antara
- Awards: World Economic Forum – Excellence Award, 2015; Herald Global & ERTC Media – The Industry's No. 1 Award in Art, 2024; Digital Studio Awards – Best Upcoming Filmmaker, 2011; Made in UAE Awards – Distinguished Achievement Award, 2011

Mohammed Ashraf Ghori (born 17 September 1973), is an Indian comic book artist, filmmaker and entrepreneur based in Dubai. He is best known for creating UAE's first CGI science fiction film Xero Error a futuristic cyborg thriller which was shown at the 63rd Cannes Film Festival. and as the artist behind UAE's acclaimed Arabic Graphic Novel Antara. He is the CEO and founder of digital design agency Xpanse CGI.

== Early life and professional career ==
Ghori moved from Hyderabad, India to Dubai, UAE at the age of 2. His father, Mohammed Moinuddin Ghori, was a prominent businessman in the construction industry and a philanthropist. His first professional work appeared in the pages of magazines published by Khaleej Times. He was a regular illustrator for Young Times from 1989 until 2001. Ghori graduated from the University of Houston, Texas in 1994.

Ghori was on the judges panel for the Kuwait Arab Advertising Awards for the years 2006 and 2007.

In 2007, he founded digital creative agency Xpanse CGI in Dubai and started independent film-making with Xero Error in 2008. Xero Error premiered at the 3rd Gulf Film Festival and also played at the 63rd Cannes Film Festival and the 10th edition of Sci-Fi-London. In 2010, Ghori was the Art Director for the first Indo-Emirati film 'Malal'. He worked as Senior Digital Artist at Bayyinah TV from 2016 to 2017. Ghori received the Pioneer in Arts Golden Visa from the Government of the United Arab Emirates.

In 2024 Ghori founded Remixx.AI, Dubai’s first AI-driven creative studio for fully synthetic video creation.

== Artist ==
Ghori has produced work for comic book publishers including Dark Horse Comics and IDW Publishing.

San Jacinto College in Pasadena Texas had organized a Comic Art Exhibit of Ghori's works in 1993. In 1994, Ghori was a founding member of Tempest Comics in Houston, Texas, and produced a 4-issue mini series 'Tempest Comics Presents'. He was a featured comic artist at Dallas Fantasy Fair, 1994 (Dallas, Texas).

In April 2012, Ghori was a featured guest, along with Alvin Lee, Lee Townsend and Yishan Li at the first MEFCC - Middle East Film and Comic Con in Dubai, UAE, and at the Middle East's inaugural IGN Convention in July 2013. In 2013 Ghori was a contributing artist for Dark Horse Comics in collaboration with writer Alex De Campi.

In 2015 Ghori collaborated with Arab rapper Narcy to create a mixed-media project called World War Free Now which combined music, video, and comics together. A limited edition comic was released as a companion piece to Narcy's album. In 2018 his work on Arabic graphic novel 'Antara' received critical acclaim as 'An Experiment Worthy of Praise' citing 'the versatility and sheer genius of the artist'.

== Social media influencer ==
In 2015, Ghori was listed among social media influencers in the United Arab Emirates. Between 2011 and 2014, he collaborated with Samsung as an art influencer for the Note series. In 2014, he served as social media ambassador for Ford Middle East's "Stand Out" campaign in the MENA region, and in 2015 participated in the "#ExperienceFord" campaign promoting the Ford Mustang 2016. In 2016, Ghori appeared in Microsoft's "#DoGreatThingsDXB" campaign, which promoted Windows 10 and the launch of the Surface Pro 4 in the Gulf region.

Ghori has also spoken at events in the UAE on topics related to design, film, AI, and entrepreneurship.

== Awards ==
- Herald Global & BARC Asia – Pride of UAE Influential Leaders Awards 2026
- Herald Global & ERTC Media – The Industry's No. 1 Award in Art, 2024
- World Economic Forum – Excellence Award, 2015
- Esquire - UAE's Most Influential Digital Pioneers Award 2014
- Digital Studio Awards – Best up and coming filmmaker, 2011
- Made in UAE Awards – Distinguished Achievement Award, 2011

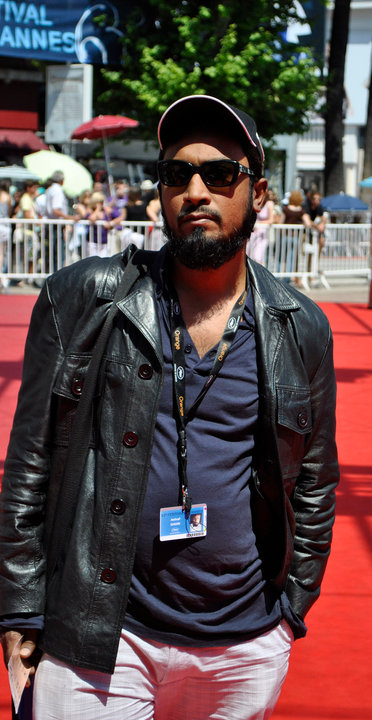
Ashraf Ghori at the 63rd Cannes Film Festival red carpet

== Filmography ==
- 2023 Baab (Feature Film) - Concept Artist, Creature Designer
- 2022 Desert Warrior (Feature Film) - Concept Artist
- 2012 Djinn (Feature Film) - Concept Artist
- 2010 Levity – Xero Error Minus1 (08:00, Digital Animated Film) - Writer, Director, Producer
- 2010 Malal (Short Film) – Art Director, Associate Producer (Xpanse CGI)
- 2009 City of Life (Feature Film) – Graphic Designer
- 2006 Arabana (Short Film) – Associate Producer
