= S. A. Zaidi =

Emirati film director

- Born: United Arab Emirates

S. A. Zaidi is a Dubai-based film director in the United Arab Emirates. He is best known for the first Arab science fiction film Aerials, and the Emirati post-apocalyptic science fiction film The Sons of Two Suns.

== Early life and career ==
S. A. Zaidi was born and raised in the United Arab Emirates, but is originally from Pakistan. His father Dr. Syed Azhar Ali Zaidi, is a prominent Urdu literature pioneer.

His first film The Sons of Two Suns, premiered at Gulf Film Festival, Dubai International Film Festival and had its US premiere at Boston Science Fiction Film Festival

In 2016 S. A. Zaidi released his film Aerials in cinemas across the United Arab Emirates. It was recognized as the first science fiction film in the Middle East.

He founded the company Fat Brothers Films together with Emirati film producer Ghanem Ghubash.

== Filmography ==
Year	Film	Role	Genre	Notes
2013	The Sons of Two Suns	Director and Writer	Science Fiction	Short Film
2016	Aerials	Director and Writer	Science Fiction	Feature Film
