= Xpanse CGI =

Animation and visual effects company

- Company type: Wholly owned
- Industry: Branding agency; Filmmaking; Advertising agency; Art studio
- Founded: March 2007
- Headquarters: Dubai Media City, Dubai, UAE
- Key people: Ashraf Ghori; Waqqas Qadir Sheikh; Nizam Mohammed; Vonnie Maddox
- Products: Branding; Film; Visual effects; Computer-generated imagery; Animation; Web Design; Digital Art; Comics
- Owner: Ashraf Ghori
- Website: www.x-cgi.com

Xpanse CGI is an Emirati animation design visual effects company that was founded in March 2007 by Ashraf Ghori who currently serves as Xpanse's CEO. The studio originated in and operates from Dubai, UAE. Xpanse CGI is best known for creating Xero Error, the first computer generated science fiction film produced in the UAE which gained regional acclaim and official selection at prominent film festivals internationally.

== History ==
Xpanse CGI was started in 2007, in Dubai Media City. In addition to their film work, Xpanse also produces commercials, corporate videos, branding, digital art and websites.

Xpanse CGI independently produced Xero Error in 2009. The film had its world premiere at the third Gulf Film Festival, April 2010 in Dubai UAE. It was also shown at the 63rd Festival de Cannes, the tenth edition of Sci-Fi-London and other international film festivals. They were also involved as co-producers of Malal, the first Indo-Emirati film.

Xpanse was featured at the first MEFCC - Middle East Film and Comic Con in April 2012.

In 2024 Xpanse CGI formed Remixx.AI, Dubai’s first AI-driven creative studio for fully synthetic video creation.

== Xpanse CGI selected filmography ==
Year	Notable films
2006	Arabana In association with D-Seven Motion Pictures
2010	Levity Xero Error Minus1
2010	Malal In association with D-Seven Motion Pictures
2012	Djinn (ImageNation Abudhabi) - Storyboarding

== Accolades ==
- 2010 (April): Levity Xero Error Minus1, The first computer generated Sci-Fi film from the UAE
- 2011 (January): Distinguished Achievement Award for Levity Xero Error Minus1 - Abu Dhabi University
- 2011 (February): Winner, Best Filmmaker of the Year - Digital Studio Awards, Dubai
- 2011 (February): Runner-up, Animation of the Year : Levity Xero Error Minus1 - Digital Studio Awards, Dubai
- 2011 (November): Winner, Best Technology Implementation - SME Advisor Stars of Business Awards
- 2011 (November): Winner, Industry Achievement for Events & Entertainment - SME Advisor Stars of Business Awards
- 2011 (November): Nominee, Business Consultancy of the Year - SME Advisor Stars of Business Awards
- 2012 (February): Nominee, Animation of the Year - Digital Studio Awards, Dubai
- 2012 (February): Nominee, Content Creation of the Year - Digital Studio Awards, Dubai
- 2012 (February): Nominee, Studio of the Year - Digital Studio Awards, Dubai
- 2012 (February): Winner, Best Website Design - Tbreak Developer Awards, Dubai
- 2025 (November): Winner, BEST KIDS’ INITIATIVE OF THE YEAR BrightPop - ASBU BroadcastPro Awards 2025, Dubai
