= 2027 in Brazil =

Events in the year 2027 in Brazil.

== Events ==
=== Predicted and scheduled ===
- 16–17 March – GITEX AI LATAM
- 24 June–25 July – 2027 FIFA Women's World Cup

== Holidays ==
- 1 January – New Year's Day
- 8–9 February – Carnival
- 26 March – Good Friday
- 21 April – Tiradentes's Day
- 1 May – Labour Day
- 27 May – Feast of Corpus Christi
- 7 September – Independence Day
- 12 October – Our Lady of Aparecida
- 2 November – All Souls' Day
- 15 November – Republic Day
- 20 November – Black Consciousness Day
- 25 December – Christmas Day
- 31 December — New Year's Eve

== See also ==
- Mercosur
- Organization of American States
- Organization of Ibero-American States
- Community of Portuguese Language Countries
