= World Trade Centre Residence =

Dubai World Trade Centre Residence
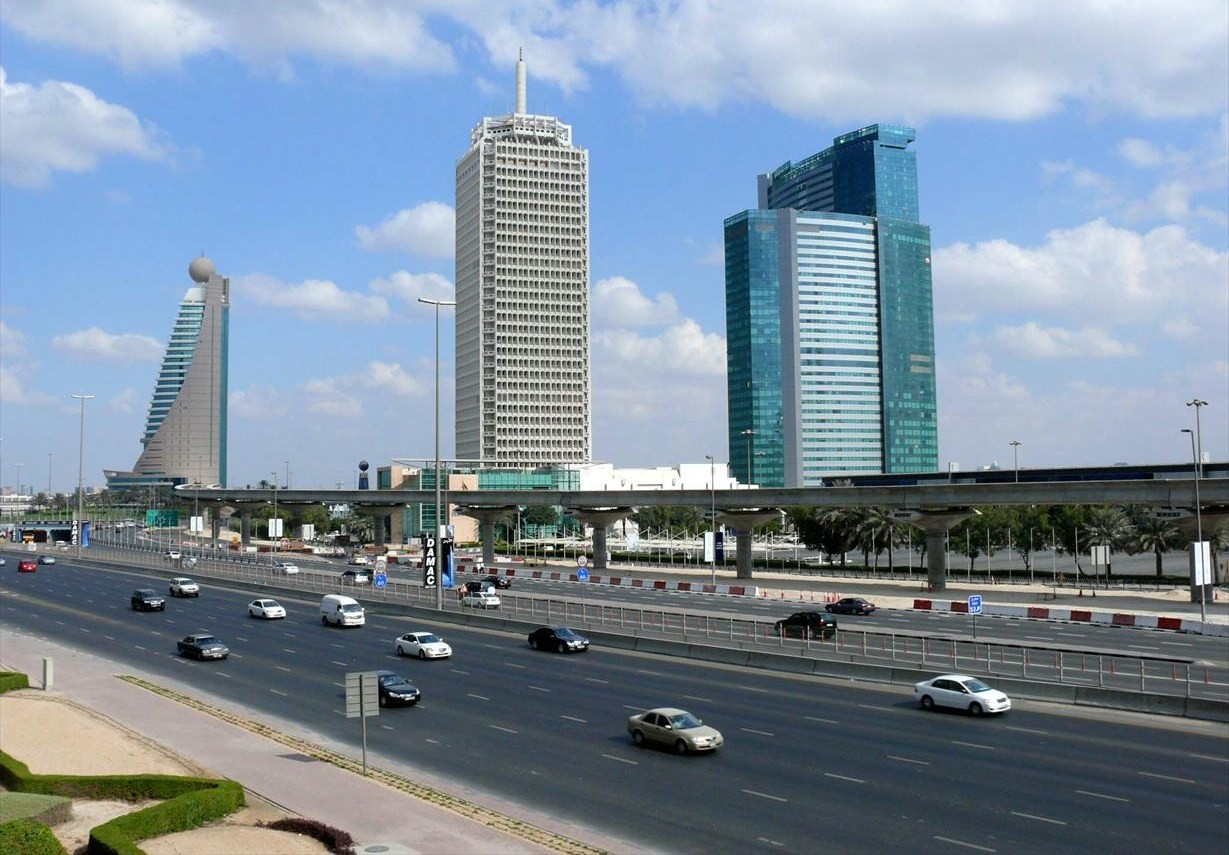
- World Trade Centre Residence is the building on the right on 28 December 2007
- Interactive map of the Dubai World Trade Centre Residence area

General information
- Type: Residential
- Location: Dubai, United Arab Emirates
- Coordinates: 25°13′36.25″N 55°17′20.13″E
- Construction started: 2005
- Completed: 2008
- Opening: 2008
- Management: Jumeirah Living

Height
- Antenna spire: 158 m (518 ft)

Technical details
- Floor count: 38

Design and construction
- Architect: Hazel W.S. Wong
- Developer: Asteco

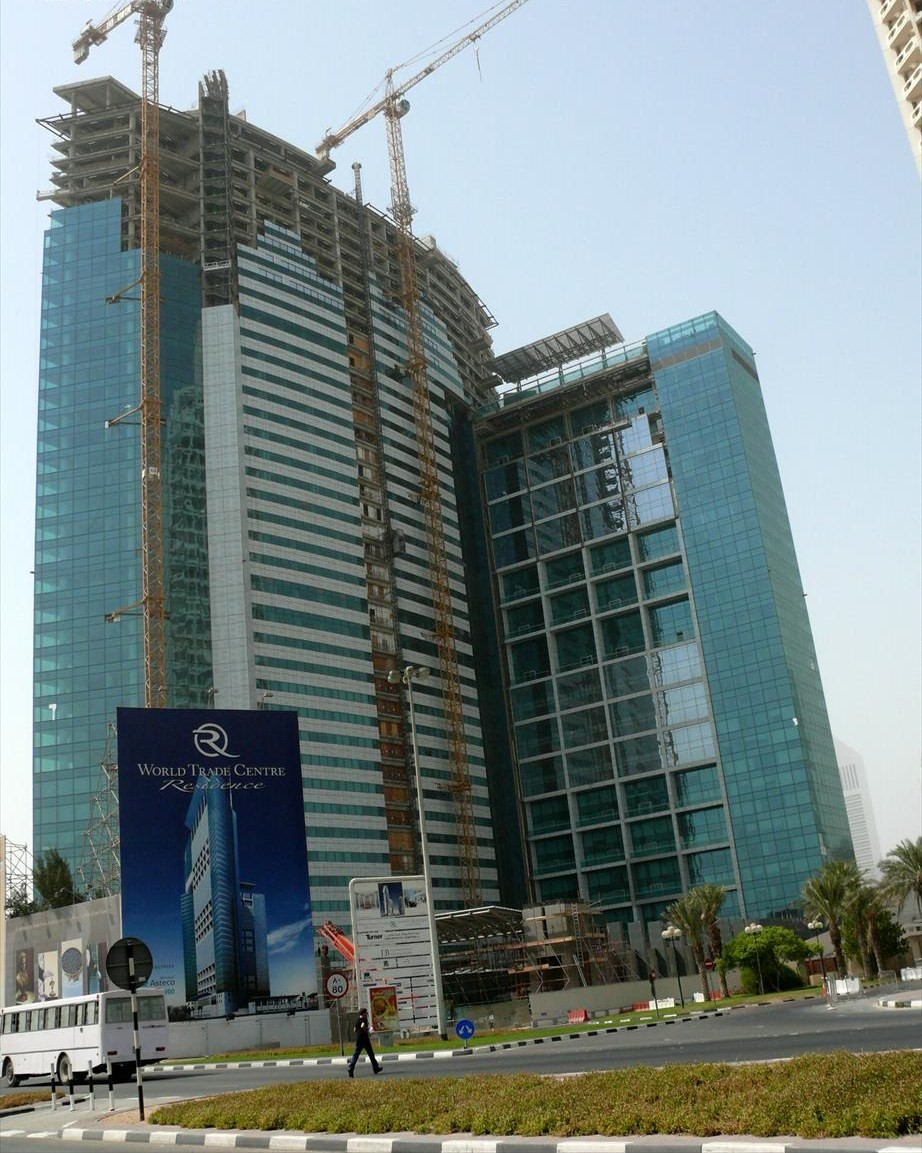
World Trade Centre Residence Under Construction on 24 August 2007

The Dubai World Trade Centre Residence is a 41-floor tower in the Dubai International Convention Centre in Dubai, United Arab Emirates. Opened in 2008, World Trade Centre Residence is managed by Jumeirah Living. Jumeirah Living offers a mix of one to four bedroom serviced apartments within the residence for short, mid-term and extended stays. The tower has a total structural height of 158 m (518 ft). The building is a five-star residential tower alongside the Dubai World Trade Centre, Dubai's first high-rise building. Construction of the foundation began in August 2005. The building sits on the site of the old World Trade Centre Hotel.

== See also ==
- List of tallest buildings in Dubai
