= GITEX AI Europe =

Annual technology trade show in Berlin, Germany

- Date: May 21–23, 2025
- Venue: Messe Berlin
- Location: Berlin, Germany
- Type: Annual
- Theme: Technology, AI, Cybersecurity
- Organized by: Kaoun International GmbH
- Participants: 1,434 exhibitors (2025)
- Website: [http://] ]]

GITEX AI Europe is an annual technology trade show and conference held in Berlin, Germany, as part of GITEX GLOBAL. The event focuses on the European technology market, specifically in the sectors of artificial intelligence (AI), cybersecurity, quantum computing, and digital infrastructure.

The event is organized by Kaoun International GmbH, the international arm of the Dubai World Trade Centre (DWTC), in partnership with Messe Berlin.

== History ==
The establishment of GITEX AI Europe was announced in 2023 as part of a strategic move to bring the GITEX brand to the European market. The inaugural edition took place from May 21 to 23, 2025, at the Messe Berlin exhibition grounds. The launch was supported by the Berlin Senate and the German Federal Ministry for Economic Affairs and Climate Action.

The first edition of GITEX AI Europe in 2025 featured 21,650 attendees, 1,434 exhibiting companies, and 755 startups, with 513 speakers representing 125 countries. The next edition is scheduled for June 30 – July 1, 2026 in Berlin.

== Program ==
The event consists of an exhibition floor for corporate displays, several conference stages for keynote speeches, and specialized sub-events. The conference program includes tracks such as "AI Stack Sovereignty," "Cyber Regulation & Trust Convergence," and "Institutional Growth Capital."

GITEX AI Europe incorporates brands under its umbrella:

- AI Everything Europe: Focused on the development and application of generative AI and machine learning.
- North Star Europe: A dedicated program for startups and venture capital, featuring the "Supernova Challenge" pitch competition.
- GISEC Europe: A cybersecurity forum discussing regulation and infrastructure defense.
- GITEX Quantum Expo (GQX): Focused on the commercialization of quantum computing.

Institutional partners for the event include the German Federal Ministry for Economic Affairs and Climate Action, the European Innovation Council (EIC), the International Telecommunication Union (ITU), Bitkom, and Digital Dubai.
