= Aerials (film) =

- Official poster
- Directed by: S. A. Zaidi
- Written by: S. A. Zaidi; Ghanem Ghubash
- Produced by: Ghanem Ghubash
- Starring: Saga Alyasery; Ana Druzhynina; Mansoor Alfeeli; Mohammad Abu Diak
- Cinematography: S. A. Zaidi
- Edited by: Nina Sargsyan
- Music by: Atif Ali; Jawad Itani; Tabraiz Haroon; Chronicles of Khan
- Production company: Fat Brothers Films
- Release date: 2016
- Running time: 90 minutes
- Country: United Arab Emirates
- Languages: English; Arabic

Aerials is a 2016 Emirati science fiction film set in the city of Dubai, United Arab Emirates. Directed by S. A. Zaidi and produced by Ghanem Ghubash, it is the first science fiction film made in UAE. It portrays an alien invasion over the city of Dubai. It stars Saga Alyasery, Ana Druzhynina, Mansoor Alfeeli, and Mohammad Abu Diak.

== Premise ==
Earth is invaded by aliens from outer space. A multiracial couple living in the city of Dubai are confined to their home due to the uncertainty of the situation. Disconnected from the world outside due to the loss of communication, they explore their cultural differences in science in order to understand the reason behind aliens coming to our planet, only to find themselves confronted by a pair of extraterrestrial encounters at their home.

== Cast ==
- Saga Alyasery as Omar
- Ana Druzhynina as Omar's wife
- Mansoor Alfeeli as Marwan
- Mohammad Abu Diak as Guy in car
- Pascale Matar as Sara
- Luke Coutts as Insurance guy
- Abeer Mohammed as Arabic news anchor
- Tamara Ljubibratic as News anchor 1
- Derrik Sweeney as News anchor 2

== Release ==
The films official trailer was released at Middle East Film and Comic Con Dubai, and IGN Middle East Abu Dhabi. The film was released in cinemas of United Arab Emirates on June 16, 2016. The film was internationally released in May 2020 on Netflix.
