= Sunil Misra =

Sunil Mishra

- Born: 5 July 1963 (age 63); Lucknow, Uttar Pradesh, India
- Education: Lucknow University
- Occupation: Business executive
- Employer(s): Indian Electrical and Electronics Manufacturers' Association
- Known for: Director General - IEEMA
- Spouse: Renu Misra
- Children: 1 (Malvi)
- Parent(s): P D Misra and Krishna Misra

Sunil Kumar Misra (born 5 July 1963) is an Indian business executive and amateur rally driver who is the Director General of Indian Electrical and Electronics Manufacturers' Association (IEEMA), in office since 7 October 2013. Before joining IEEMA, he served the Confederation of Indian Industry as Head of Public Policy.

== Career ==
From 1992 till 1997, Misra was the executive director of the Indian Industries Association, a body of small and medium industries of Uttar Pradesh. He joined the Confederation of Indian Industry in 1997, starting at Lucknow as UP State Head of CII. He moved to Shanghai in 2003 as country head for China, where he started the Made in India shows at Shanghai and Beijing.

In 2006, he became Head of CII Eastern Regional operations covering West Bengal, Jharkhand, Chhattisgarh, Odisha and Bihar, and was based in Kolkata. He then moved to CII Headquarters in New Delhi in 2008.

Misra joined IEEMA in 2013, working with central and state governments, PSUs, utilities and public representatives.

== Racing ==
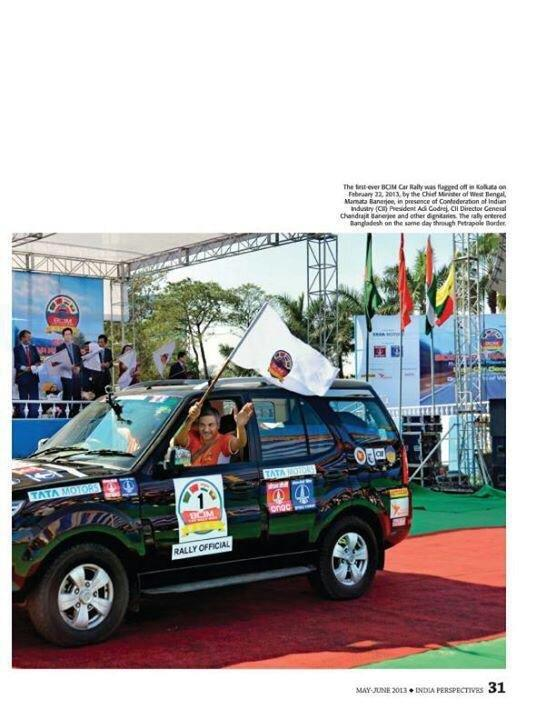
Sunil Misra during BCIM Car Rally

Misra coordinated and led the first BCIM Car Rally from India to China in 2013 via Myanmar and Bangladesh, first crossing the route in 2012 for its route survey.

In May 2018 he was invited to the INSTC (International North South Trade Corridor) Car Rally. INSTC is a project that aims to create access between India and Central Asia through a multi-modal transport system. The journey was approximately 7000 km from Saint Petersburg at the Gulf of Finland to Bandar Abbas at the Persian Gulf went via Caspian Sea. The route is of historical significance as trade existed in the 14th century between Indian Subcontinent and Central Asia.
