= Xero Error =

2010 film by Ashraf Ghori

- Official Poster
- Directed by: Ashraf Ghori
- Written by: Ashraf Ghori
- Produced by: Ashraf Ghori, Waqqas Qadir Sheikh, Mohammad Mondal
- Starring: Muhammed Ali Jamadar, Rhiannon Downie, Mouna Abbassy, Phat Mo, Nasser Chhipa, Nick Rego, Adnan Arif, Aqeel Fikree
- Edited by: Waqqas Qadir Sheikh
- Music by: Abdul Razzak Al Busmait 'Q', Phat Mo, DJ Rav
- Distributed by: Xpanse CGI
- Release date: April 2010
- Running time: 8 minutes
- Country: United Arab Emirates
- Language: English
- Budget: $37,000

Xero Error, also known as Levity - Xero Error Minus1, is a computer generated science fiction film created and directed by Ashraf Ghori and starring Muhammad Ali Jamadar, Rhiannon Downie, Mouna Abbassy, Phat Mo, Nasser Chhipa, Nick Rego, Adnan Arif, and Aqeel Fikree. It was produced by Xpanse CGI. It is notable for being UAE's first CGI science fiction film. It was shown at the 63rd Cannes Film Festival.

== Production ==
Production on Xero Error commenced in November 2009 and completed by March 2010 . Xero Error is UAE's first film produced using computer-generated imagery. It is also the first film for production company Xpanse CGI, which has worked previously in commercial advertising. In December 2008, Xpanse officials were in Houston, in attempts to raise the financing to cover the budget.

Although the budget needed for a feature-length version of the film was not raised, it was produced as an eight-minute short and completed independently at Xpanse CGI. Volunteers from social media channels were enlisted to complete the film. Actors were auditioned after a Twitter and Facebook campaign.

== Release ==
The film had its world premiere at the 3rd Gulf Film Festival, April 2010 in Dubai UAE. It was also featured at the 63rd Festival de Cannes, the 10th edition of Sci-Fi-London and other international film festivals.

Following its release, Xpanse CGI were seeking investors to produce Xero Error for TV & film.

== Awards and recognition ==
- Digital Studio Awards 2011 — Winner, Best up and coming filmmaker
- Digital Studio Awards 2011 — Runner-up, Animation of the Year
- Made in UAE Awards — Distinguished Achievement Award, 2011
- Gulf Film Festival, 2010 — Official Selection
- Festival de Cannes 2010 — Screening, Court Metrage
- Sci-Fi-London 2011 — Official Selection
- ICon festival 2011 — Official Selection
- SME Advisor Stars of Business Awards 2011 — Winner, Best Technology Implementation
- SME Advisor Stars of Business Awards 2011 — Winner, Industry Achievement for Events & Entertainment

== Cast ==
- XE7 - Muhammad Ali Jamadar
- ACYD - Rhiannon Downie
- In Raby - Phat Mo
- News Reporters

David George-Cosh
Mouna Abbassy
Nick Rego
Nasser Chhipa
Adnan Arif

- Sheikh Abdullah - Aqeel Fikree
- Video Caller - Mohammad Mondal
