= GITEX AI LATAM =

- Status: Upcoming
- Genre: Technology exhibition and conference
- Frequency: Annual
- Venue: Anhembi Convention Center
- Locations: Anhembi Convention Center, São Paulo, Brazil
- Country: Brazil
- Inaugurated: 16–17 March 2027
- Organiser: KAOUN International; Dubai World Trade Centre
- Website: https://www.gitexlatam.com/

GITEX AI LATAM (also referred to as GITEX LATAM) is an upcoming technology exhibition and conference scheduled for 16–17 March 2027 at Anhembi Convention Center, São Paulo, Brazil. The inaugural edition is the first Latin American event in the GITEX series and is organised by DWTC and Informa and hosted by City Hall of São Paulo.

== History ==
GITEX AI LATAM was announced on 14 October 2025 during the 45th edition of GITEX Global in Dubai. The event represents the first expansion of the GITEX series, which began in Dubai in 1980, into the Western Hemisphere.

The announcement was made jointly with editions planned for India, Serbia and Türkiye. DWTC executive vice-president Trixie LohMirmand said the initiative was intended to "amplify access to investments, knowledge and technology" for Latin American startups and enterprises. São Paulo Mayor Ricardo Nunes described the event as a platform for connecting local innovators with international markets.

According to the organisers, the selection of São Paulo reflected Brazil's position within Latin America's digital economy, which industry research cited at the time of announcement projected at approximately US$950 billion by 2026.

== Location ==
The event is scheduled to be held at Distrito Anhembi, a convention complex in the northern zone of São Paulo. São Paulo hosts a concentration of technology companies and startup activity; in industry coverage, a 2025 StartupBlink ranking placed it first among Latin American startup ecosystems.

The São Paulo City Hall, through the Municipal Secretariat for Economic Development and Labour (SMDET) and ADESAMPA, acted as host and partner in securing the event.

== Programme ==
According to the organisers, the event is planned as a two-day exhibition and conference covering multiple sectors of the digital economy. Announced thematic areas include:

- Artificial intelligence and data infrastructure
- Cybersecurity
- Financial technology
- Cloud computing and data centres
- Agritech, healthtech and renewable energy
- E-commerce, mobility and connectivity

The programme is to include keynote sessions, panel discussions, pre-arranged business meetings and a startup and investment platform intended to connect early- and growth-stage companies with investors. The organisers have also indicated plans for invitation-only forums on digital investment and international cooperation, including a UAE–LATAM Business Forum and a LATAM Digital Investment Forum.

== Projected participation ==
Organiser estimates published in trade and technology media at the time of announcement projected attendance of more than 35,000 participants from over 70 countries for the inaugural edition, with approximately 700 exhibiting companies and startups, more than 200 speakers, and in excess of 2,500 pre-arranged business meetings. The figures are organiser projections and have not been independently verified.

== Context ==
The announcement formed part of a broader international expansion of the GITEX brand by DWTC and Informa, with parallel editions announced for India, Serbia and Türkiye. Reporting placed the São Paulo edition within a wider pattern of investment flows between the United Arab Emirates and Latin America, with Brazilian officials presenting the event as a vehicle for attracting foreign direct investment into the local technology sector.
