= Indian Electrical and Electronics Manufacturers Association =

Indian Electrical and Electronics Manufacturers' Association
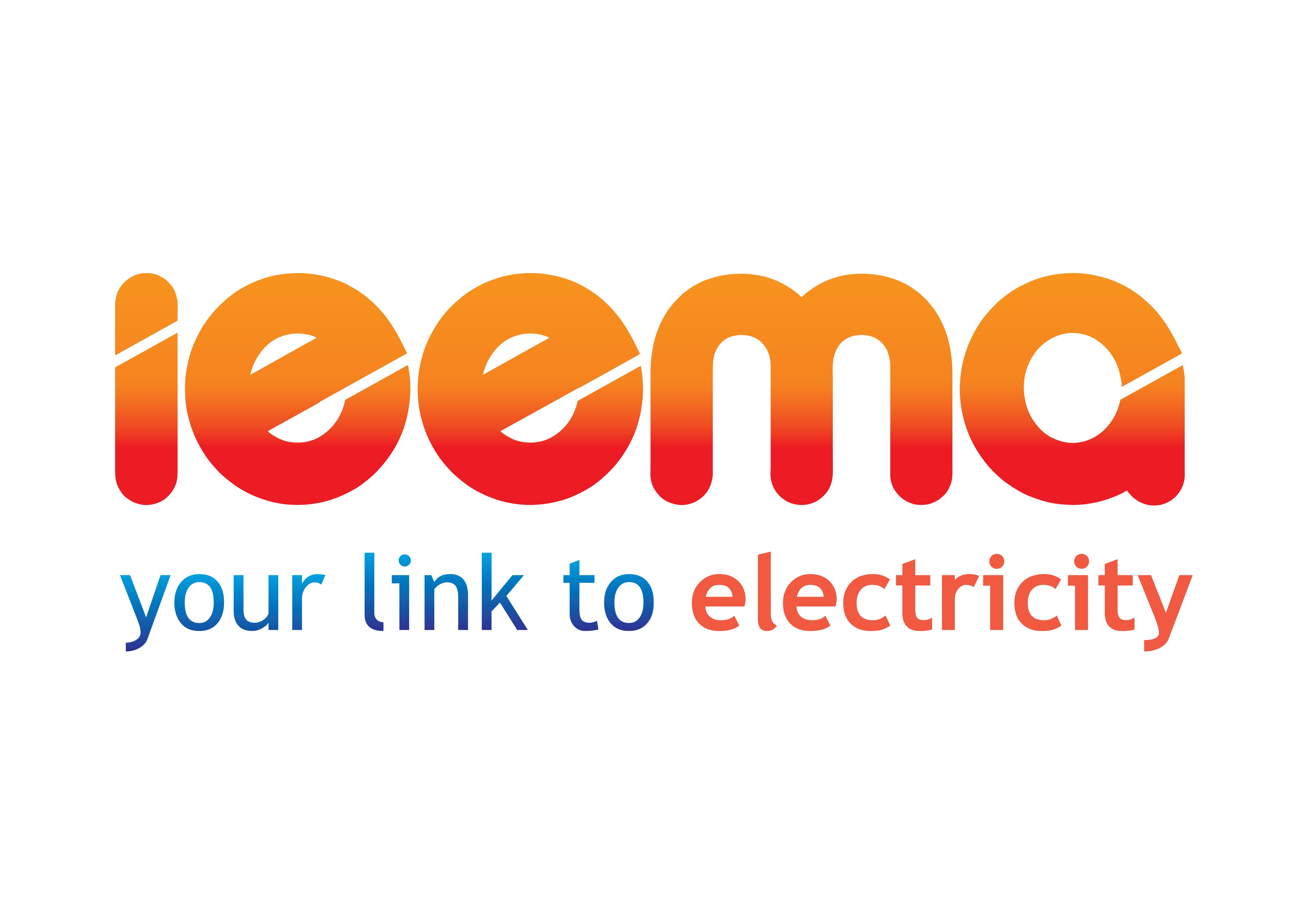
- Abbreviation: IEEMA
- Founded: 1948; 78 years ago
- Type: Non-governmental trade association
- Purpose: Policy advocacy
- Headquarters: New Delhi, India
- Fields: Electrical equipment Electronics; Allied equipment
- Members: Around 900
- President: Hamza Arsiwala
- President (Elect): Sunil Singhvi
- Vice President: Vikram Gandotra
- Director General: Charu Mathur
- Website: ieema.org

Indian Electrical and Electronics Manufacturers' Association (IEEMA) is an Indian non-governmental trade association and advocacy group focused on the manufacturing of electrical, electronics and allied equipment. IEEMA maintains the dialogue with the government of India, its department, electric utilities, users, standardisation bodies, educational institutions, research, development and testing agencies. Hamza Arsiwala is the president of IEEMA for the 2023-2024 term, while Sunil Singhvi and Vikram Gandotra are the President (Elect) and Vice President respectively. Charu Mathur is the Director General of IEEMA.

IEEMA collaborates with standardization bodies, R&D organizations, testing institutes, industry leaders, autonomous institutions, and various trade and regional associations.

The Indian electrical industry is represented by Indian Electrical and Electronics Manufacturers' Association (IEEMA), which was established in 1948, comprising all segments of electricity from source to socket i.e. generation, transmission, distribution to last mile connectivity/ usage and allied components & accessories. IEEMA members are also active in new energy space like EV components/ E-Mobility, Battery storage, Renewable Energy and Green Hydrogen value chain etc. More than 90% of the installed electrical equipment in the country have been contributed by IEEMA members. The combined turnover of the members is in excess of USO 50 bn exporting goods of over USD 10 bn.

Recognised as the first point of reference for anything pertaining to Power and Electrical Equipment, IEEMA plays a primary role to facilitate the creation of a conducive environment for the growth of the electrical industry by providing key services like Policy Advocacy. The Government officials laud IEEMA for its data-backed representations. It also continues to represent the interests of its members, in consonance with National interest.

A prominent size and space is occupied by the Electrical Equipment and Machinery in the Capital Goods Sector, which is more than 45 percent of the entire Capital Goods Sector. The industry is 6.8% of the manufacturing sector in terms of value and 1.07% of the NOP. It also provides direct and indirect employment to 1.5 million people and over 5 million across the entire value chain.

== Export promotion ==
IEEMA organizes delegation visits and participation in exhibitions abroad for the promotion of export of its members. Activities of IEEMA Interactive session of IEEMA International Events participation of IEEMA IEEMA IBD Meetings MoU Partners of IEEMA Participation at International Event Participation on Hannover Messe, Germany Participation in Africa Utility Week, Cape Town S Africa Participation in 5th International Istanbul Smart Grids and Cities Congress and Fair, Istanbul, Turkey Participation in Middle East Electricity Dubai

== Publications ==
=== Information circulars ===
Through its circulars, the Government circulates information about procedural and policy changes made in taxation, import-export policy, industrial regulations, as well as tender information, business opportunities, production and import-export statistics, standards, and other matters of interest to the industry.

IEEMA Journal is a publication of IEEMA which covers technical and techno-commercial articles, industry information, statistics, business opportunities, IEEMA activities etc. IEEMA Journal is the leading electrical & electronics monthly published by IEEMA since June 1981, covering articles of techno-commercial importance, national and international news related to power sector. It is the only trade journal certified by Audit Bureau of Circulation (ABC), with the circulation of 10,000 copies every month.

=== Directory of members ===
A directory of members, IEEMA Directory containing information about its members and the industry.

== Events ==
=== ELECRAMA ===
ELECRAMA is a biennial exhibition for power, electrical, and industrial electronics and allied products organized by IEEMA. It is one of the largest international exhibition of electrical and industrial electronics industry in the world.

=== TRAFOTECH ===
TRAFOTECH Global Conference is an international event.

=== IEEMA training programs ===
IEEMA organizes training programs catering to the needs of the Indian industry.

== See also ==
- MIOS - Meter Inter Operability Solution
