= Middle East Film and Comic Con =

Multigenre conventions in Dubai

Middle East Film & Comic Con
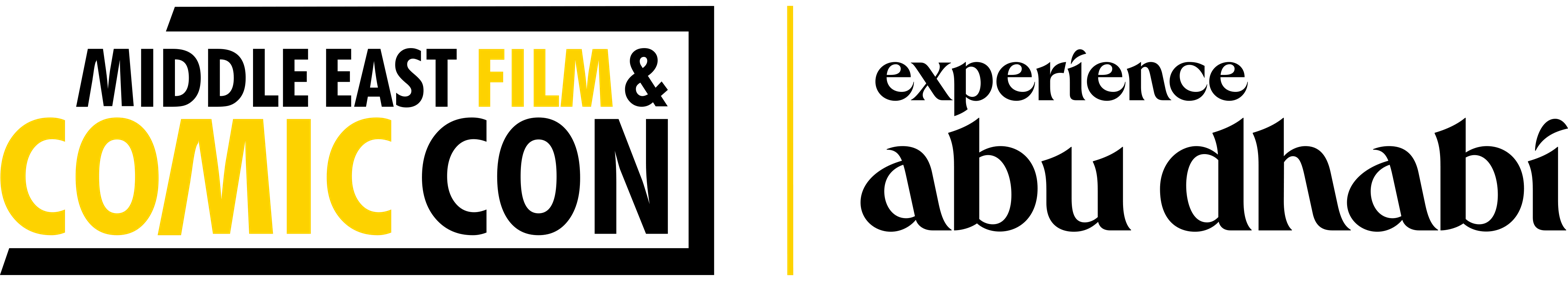
- Status: Active
- Genre: Speculative fiction, Comics, Film, Celebrities
- Venue: ADNEC Centre, Abu Dhabi
- Locations: Abu Dhabi, United Arab Emirates
- Coordinates: 24°25′10.34″N 54°26′9.29″E
- Country: United Arab Emirates
- Inaugurated: 2012; 14 years ago
- Most recent: April 18, 2025; 18 months ago
- Next event: September 11, 2026; 54 days ago
- Attendance: 46,000 visitors in 2025
- Organizer: Informa Connect
- Filing status: For-profit
- Website: Middle East Film & Comic Con

The Middle East Film & Comic Con (commonly referred to as MEFCC) is a speculative fiction convention held annually in the United Arab Emirates.

Inaugurated in 2012, it is the first & largest pop culture convention in the Middle East. In the first few years, MEFCC was held at the World Trade Centre and other venues across Dubai, moving to Abu Dhabi for its most recent editions in 2022, 2023, 2024 and 2025 (18-20 April).

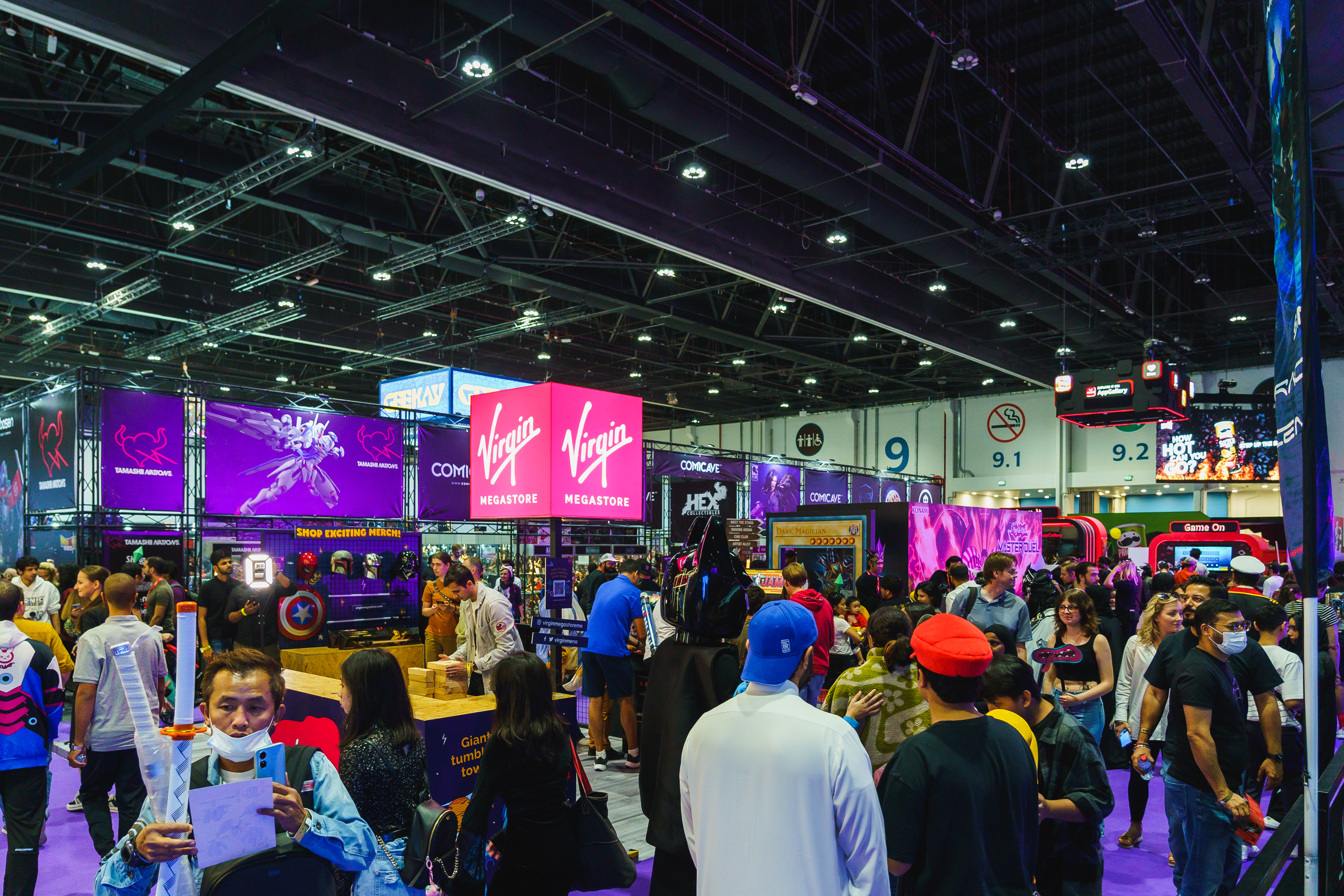
MEFCC show floor for 2023

== History ==
The convention was founded in April 2012 by the Dubai-based events management and communications agency ExtraCake PRA and T he Alliance. In 2018, Informa. took over operations of the event. The 2022 editions onwards were held by Informa with the support of the Department of Culture and Tourism - Abu Dhabi.

The 2025 edition of MEFCC saw record-breaking numbers, with over 46,000 visitors attending the three-day festival held at the Abu Dhabi National Exhibition Centre (ADNEC).

== Events and Attractions ==
Focusing on comic books, science fiction, fantasy, film and television in the initial years, MEFCC has expanded over the years to include more niches within popular arts and culture including animation, anime, manga, video games, webcomics and fantasy fiction. Toys, merchandise and collectibles are also a key attraction at the convention.

MEFCC features activities for different interests and age groups. These include the Exhibitors that sell comics, limited edition merch, and exclusive collectables, Main Stage, which screens short films and hosts panels with celebrities & community members, and Meet the Stars which offers fans the opportunity to meet celebrities and take photographs or autographs with them. Also at the event is Cosplay Central, a zone exclusively for cosplayers. MEFCC hosts a popular Cosplay Competition where participants dress up as their favorite characters and perform for a large crowd.

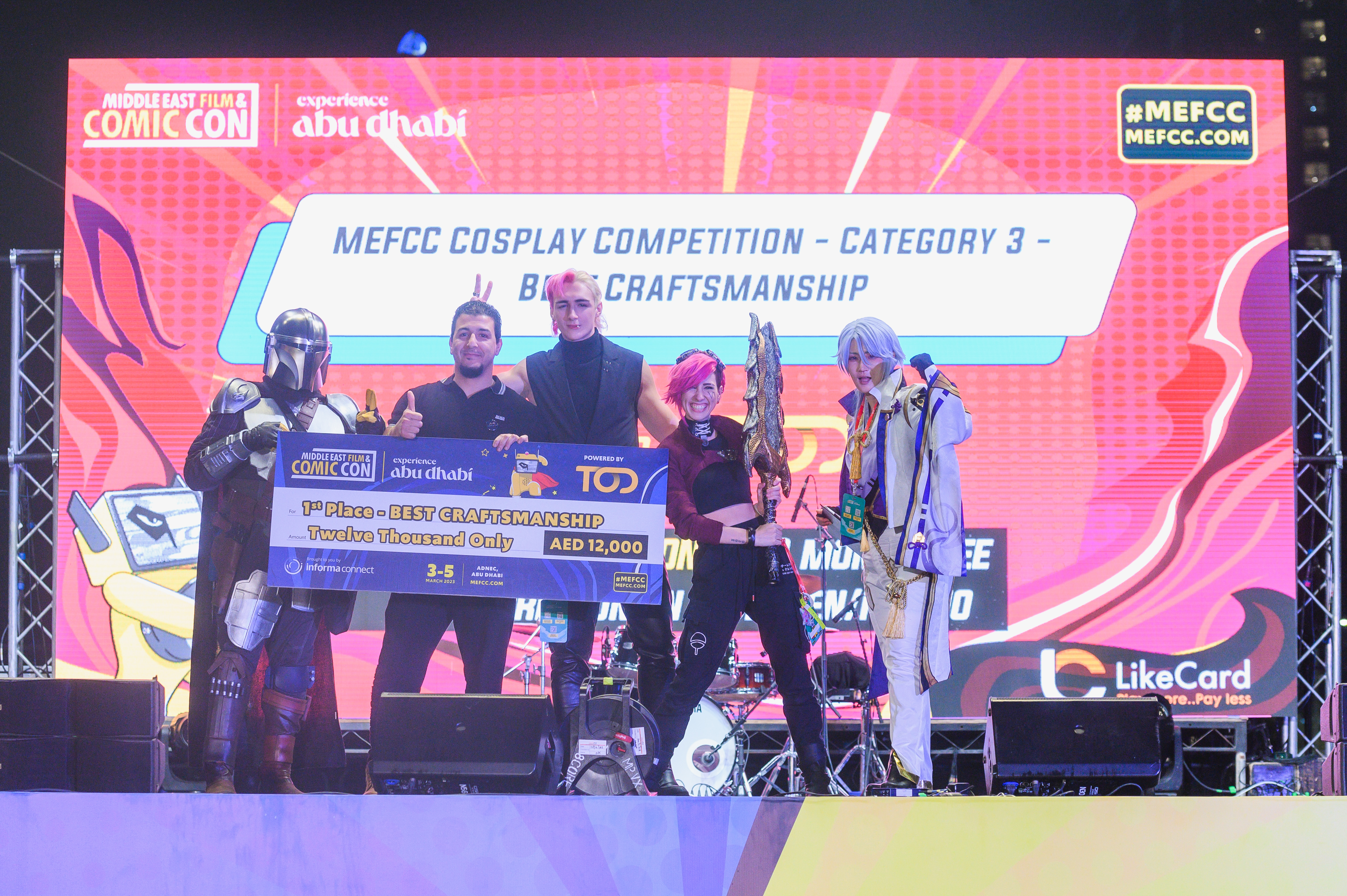
Craftsmanship Cosplayer winner for 2023

The festival houses the Artist Alley, which gives up-and-coming local artists a platform to display and sell their pop culture creations. In addition, the International Artist Alley showcases global creators who have played an influential role in the world of comics, manga and the arts through their specialized skills in sketching, animation, editing, storytelling, fan art and animation.

MEFCC also has a dedicated Gaming Arena which has held tournaments ranging from FC 26, Fortnite, Tekken and more. In 2022, a prize money pool of approximately AED 30,000 was available to contestants.

Other facilities at the venue include the Festival Plaza, an entertainment and relaxation zone with food trucks, where fans can enjoy music and dance performances, and other forms of entertainment.

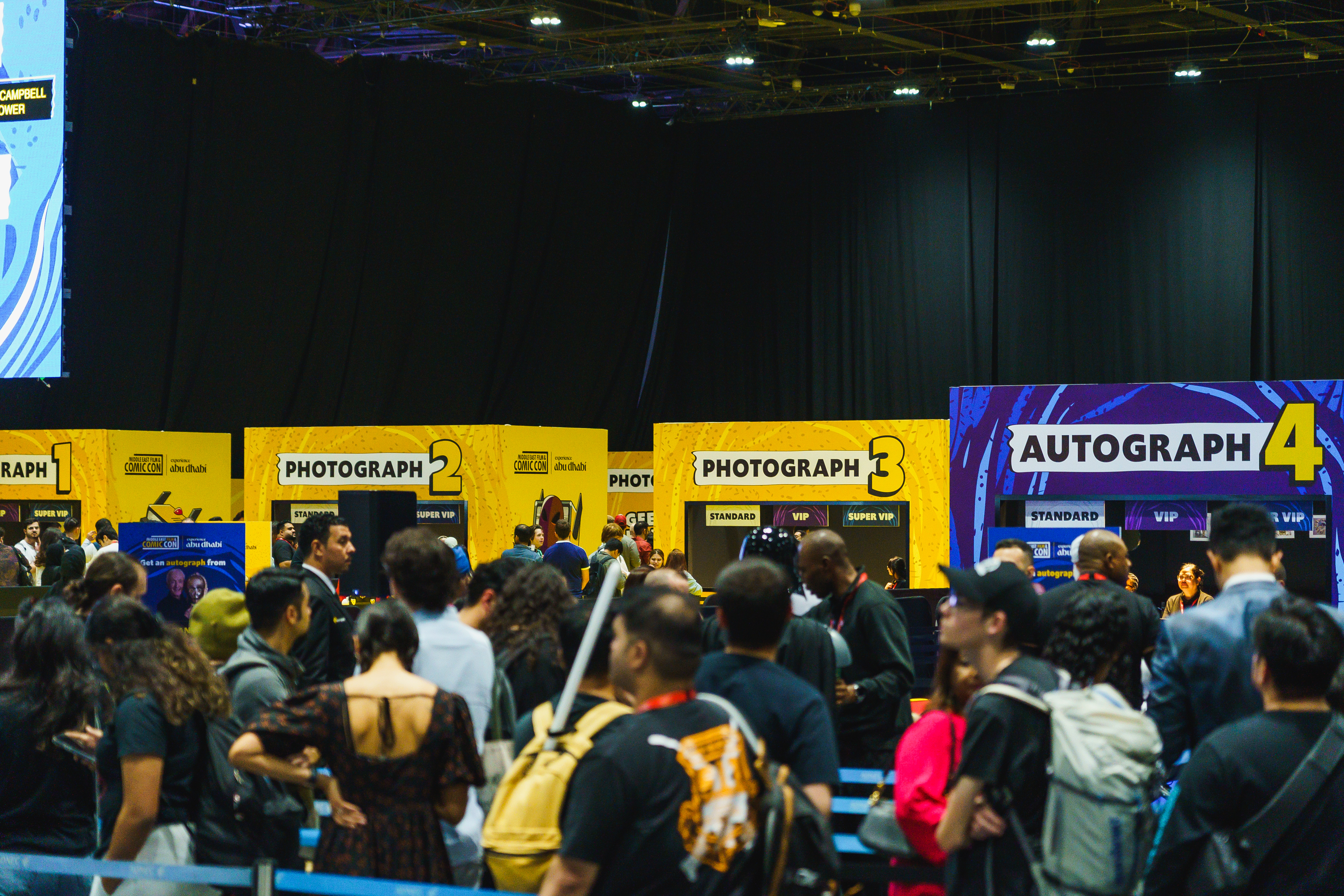
Meet the Star Zone for 2023

== Celebrities at MEFCC ==
Since inception, MEFCC has hosted many stars from popular film and television franchises including Andrew Garfield, Grant Gustin, Emily Rudd, Iñaki Godoy, Oscar Isaac, Jason Momoa, Hayden Christensen, Andy Serkis, Zachery Levi, David Harbour, Matt Smith, Karl Urban, Giancarlo Esposito, Charlie Cox, Anthony Mackie, Nathalie Emmanuel, Michael Rooker & May Calamawy. A more detailed list of celebrity guests is included in the table below.

== Location and Dates ==
Dates	Convention Name	Location	Guests	Notes
April 20–21, 2012	Middle East Film and Comic Con	Dubai International Marine Club, Mina Seyahi Hall	Jason Momoa, Laurie Holden, John Rhys-Davies, Luciana Carro, Mark Sheppard, Alodia Gosiengfiao, Sonia Leong, Ashraf Ghori	People at the 2012 convention.
April 5–6, 2013	Middle East Film and Comic Con	Dubai International Marine Club, Mina Seyahi Hall	Sean Astin, Alan Tudyk, Warwick Davis, Ioan Gruffudd, Manu Bennett, Max Landis, Yuri Lowenthal, Tara Platt, Ashraf Ghori	over 20,000 fans from across the region in attendance
April 3–5, 2014	Middle East Film and Comic Con	Dubai International Exhibition and Conference Centre building, Dubai World Trade Centre	Seth Green, Taylor Kitsch, Michael Jai White, Giancarlo Esposito, Tony Jaa, Christopher Sabat, Max Landis, Sylvester McCoy, Ashraf Ghori	
April 9–11, 2015	Middle East Film and Comic Con	Dubai International Exhibition and Conference Centre building, Dubai World Trade Centre	Gillian Anderson, Hayley Atwell, William Shatner, Angelica Bridges, Caitlin Glass, Kelly Hu, Sam J Jones, Max Landis, Vic Mignogna, Bryce Papenbrook, Clive Standen, Miltos Yerolemou, Mitsuhisa Ishikawa	an attendance of over 50,000
April 6–8, 2016	Middle East Film and Comic Con	Dubai International Exhibition and Conference Centre building, Dubai World Trade Centre	Stan Lee via live video, Veronica Taylor, Nikolaj Coster-Waldau, Summer Glau, Christopher Lloyd, Nick Frost, Fabian Nicieza, Kevin Eastman, Alodia Gosiengfiao, Whilce Portacio	
April 6–8, 2017	Middle East Film and Comic Con	Dubai International Exhibition and Conference Centre building, Dubai World Trade Centre	Anthony Mackie, Liam Cunningham, Josh McDermitt, Greg Grunberg, Chad Hardin, Nicole Marie Jean, Linda Le, Kevin Smith, Kane, Faisal Al Hashmi, Mustafa Abbas, Reshel Shah Kapoor	
April 5–7, 2018	Middle East Film and Comic Con	Dubai International Exhibition and Conference Centre building, Dubai World Trade Centre	Ezra Miller, Jenna Coleman, Kristian Nairn, Karl Urban, Jason David Frank, Ray Chase, Tom Cook, Robbie Daymond, Alodia Gosiengfiao, Adam Kubert, Stu Levy, Yishan Li, Max Mittelman, Tsuyoshi Nonaka, Phil Ortiz, Arthur Suydam, Long Vo	First event by Informa
April 11–13, 2019	Middle East Film and Comic Con	Dubai International Exhibition and Conference Centre building, Dubai World Trade Centre	Zachary Levi, Benedict Wong, Tara Strong, Iwan Rheon, Katie Cassidy, Ross Marquand, William Simpson, David Finch, Mitsuhiro Arita, Sana Takeda, Simon Bisley, David Angelo Roman, James Mulligan, Simone Di Meo, Kai Green, Alodia Gosiengfiao, Cavin Lam	
March 5–7, 2020	Middle East Film and Comic Con	Dubai International Exhibition and Conference Centre building, Dubai World Trade Centre	Mena Massoud, Brandon Routh, Elodie Yung, John Rhys Davies, Joseph David Jones, Sam De La Rosa, Philo Barnhart, Mostafa Moussa, Jeremy Clark, Michael Watkins, Rags Morales, Rodney Ramos, Georges Janty, Emanuela Lupacchino, Rei Suzuki Cosplay, Kaoru Lily Cosplay	
March 4–6, 2022	Middle East Film and Comic Con	Abu Dhabi National Exhibition Centre, Abu Dhabi	Charlie Cox, Barry Keoghan, Michael Rooker, Nathalie Emmanuel, Ming Na Wen, Kevin Conroy, Sean Schemmel, Charles Martinet, Hirokatsu Kihara, Rob Liefeld, Rob Paulsen, Townsend Coleman, Cam Clarke, David Nakayama, Mark Brooks, Reilly Brown, Creees Lee, Leon Chiro, Sakura Flor, Majed Cosplay	First time the event is in Abu Dhabi
March 3 – 5, 2023	Middle East Film and Comic Con	Abu Dhabi National Exhibition Centre, Abu Dhabi	Zach Aguilar, Jamie Campbell Bower, May Calamawy, Greg Capullo, Hayden Christensen, Anthony Daniels, David Harbour, Hirokatsu Kihara, Ken Lashley, James C. Mulligan, Paige O'Hara, Ryan Ottley, Mike Peraza, Patty Peraza, Reika, David Angelo Roman, Christopher Sabat, Andy Serkis, Matt Smith, and Long Vo	Attendance of over 35,000
February 9 – 11, 2024	Middle East Film and Comic Con	Abu Dhabi National Exhibition Centre, Abu Dhabi	Troy Baker, Peter Cullen, Toru Furuya, Iñaki Godoy, Oscar Isaac, Temuera Morrison, James & Oliver Phelps, Frank Welker	Attendance of over 38,000
April 18 – 20, 2025	Middle East Film and Comic Con	Abu Dhabi National Exhibition Centre, Abu Dhabi	Andrew Garfield, Grant Gustin, Charlie Cox, Wilson Bethel, Ian McDiarmid, Emily Rudd, Natalia Dyer, Colleen O'Shaughnessey, Hideo Ishikawa, Kotono Mitsuishi, Daiki Yamashita, Tetsuya Kakihara, Kentaro Ito	Attendance of over 46,000
