= MIOS =

MIOS or Meter Inter Operability Solution is a specification for interoperability of electric meters for remote meter reading applications in India proposed by IEEMA in 2008. and is developed and maintained by Metering India which is a group of Meter Manufacturers.

== See also ==
- Bureau of Indian Standards
- Indian Electrical and Electronics Manufacturers Association(IEEMA)
- IEC 62056 is a set of standards for Electricity metering data exchange by International Electrotechnical Commission.
- DLMS
