= Middle East Electricity =

Middle East Energy
- Status: Active
- Genre: Trade show, electricity, power, renewable, energy, lighting
- Venue: Dubai World Trade Centre
- Location: Dubai
- Country: United Arab Emirates
- Inaugurated: 1976
- Most recent: 2019
- Attendance: 50,000+ (2011)
- Organizer: Informa Exhibitions
- Website: www.middleeast-energy.com

Hosted by the UAE Ministry of Energy and based in Dubai, Middle East Energy is the leading international trade event for the power industry, covering the generation, transmission and distribution of electricity, storage & management of energy and the lighting industry. The event is held at Dubai World Trade Centre in the United Arab Emirates. Organised by Informa Exhibitions, Middle East Electricity is partnered with Electricx in Egypt and Power Nigeria in Lagos.

== The exhibition ==
The exhibition is held under the patronage of Sheikh Maktoum bin Mohammed bin Rashid Al Maktoum, Deputy Ruler of Dubai. Exhibitors include large industrial companies, municipalities, building contractors, electrical retailers, electro-mechanical contractors, dealers and distributors, municipalities, government bodies, oil and gas companies, equipment manufactures, power producers, utility companies, power plant operators, power producers and power generation companies.

The exhibition also features an award ceremony - the Middle East Energy Awards and a diverse range of educational opportunities including professional workshops, product focused technical seminars and a high level conference.

== Awards ==
The Middle East Electricity Awards takes place on the opening night of the event at a gala dinner and covers nine individual categories:

- Power Project of the Year
- Lighting Project of the Year
- Solar Project of the Year
- Best Innovation or Technology of the Year
- HSE Project of the Year
- Young Engineer of the Year
- Power & Water Utility of the Year
- Best Marketing Campaign Award (exhibitor award)
- Best Product Launch at MEE (exhibitor award)
