= Ghanem Ghubash =

Ghanem Ghubash is an Emirati film producer in the United Arab Emirates. He is the creator and producer of the first Emirati science-fiction film in the Arab world called Aerials, and the producer of the Emirati post-apocalyptic science-fiction film The Sons of Two Suns.

== Early life and career ==
Ghanem Ghubash is the son of journalist, Dr.Mohammad Obaid Ghubash, who was also the chairman of the UAE's chess federation. Ghanem Ghubash was named after his uncle, Ghanem Obaid Ghubash, who was the president of UAE's Football Association in the 1970s, and was considered among the leading intellectuals of United Arab Emirates.

Ghanem studied film-making at UCSD before starting his career as a film producer in Dubai, United Arab Emirates. He founded the company Fat Brothers Films with his childhood friend, and UAE based film director S. A. Zaidi. The company was named after them, since they were frequently referred to as the Fat Brothers, or dynamic duo.

== Filmography ==
- 2013 - The Sons of Two Suns (producer)
- 2016 - Aerials (producer)
