= Boston Science Fiction Film Festival =

Film festival

- Location: Greater Boston, Massachusetts, U.S.
- Founded: 1972; 54 years ago
- Most recent: February 11–16, 2026
- Website: www.bostonscifi.com

The Boston Science Fiction Film Festival is a film festival that takes place each year in February during the week ending on Presidents' Day in the Greater Boston area. It was founded in 1976, making it the second-oldest independent genre film festival in the US. The festival includes science fiction features and short films from all over the world, culminating in a 24-hour movie marathon of classic, new, and schlock films.

== History ==
=== Beginnings ===
The ‘Thon began back in 1976 at the Orson Welles Cinema in Cambridge, Massachusetts. It was designed to complement the Boskone, the Boston Science Fiction Convention, playing in Boston that same weekend. Sunday, February 15, 1976, was the inaugural program. It featured This Island Earth, The Day the Earth Stood Still, The War of the Worlds, Things to Come, The Thing from Another World, Them!, and Zardoz. Tickets for the 14 feature film event cost $4.75 with a complimentary champagne toast at the conclusion.

The following year featured a sneak preview of a then-unknown Star Wars. Collectible posters were given out to attendees who paid the $4.95 admission price. By 1978, the event was given a tagline of SF3, connoting its third year. In a controversial decision, the ‘Thon’s 10th anniversary was a 36-hour endurance event. Additionally, the Marathon programming has included a variety of short films, serialized dramas (such as the original Buck Rogers), and cartoons such as the Warner Brothers classic Duck Dodgers in the 24½th Century.

=== End of the OWC era ===
A few months after SF11, the Orson Welles Cinema was destroyed by fire. The Marathon found a new home at the Somerville Theatre located in Davis Square, Somerville, Massachusetts which was under the operations of former Welles Manager, Garen Daly. Over the next few years, the event expanded to include more days, changed its official name to The Boston Science Fiction Film Festival, and became peripatetic.

SF12 through SF14 were held at the Somerville Theatre in Somerville, Massachusetts.

SF15 through SF28 were held at the Coolidge Corner Theatre in Brookline, Massachusetts.

SF29 was held at the Dedham Community Theater in Dedham, Massachusetts.

SF30 returned to the Somerville Theatre and also had Friday Night and Sunday Night special events.

SF31 was held at the West Newton Cinema in West Newton, Massachusetts.

SF32 again returned to the Somerville Theatre, where it has been hosted annually to date, with the exception of SF46 which was held as a virtual event online due to the COVID-19 pandemic.

=== Growth and evolution ===
With the advent of VHS and DVD, the festival faced changing tastes. To address these, it began to add more days, newer films, and more shorts reaching its current festival structure of ten days. The first nine days are devoted to showcasing new works from around the world. Judges rotate every year and are gleaned from the attendees, local personalities, and the occasional 'special' judge. Awards are presented every year for Best Feature and Best Short. In 2012, a new category was added, Steampunk Awards for this category also included Best Feature and Best Short.

Starting with SF36, the festival was expanded to a week-long event. The programming was expanded to attract newer films from around the world, especially from independent filmmakers. Typically, the festival will present roughly 30 features, 75 shorts, 10 workshops and panels, and a number of party gatherings for filmmakers and attendees to connect. The festival continues to culminate with the 24-hour Marathon, where the programming is the same as it has been from its inception.

== The Gort ==
The Boston Science Fiction Film Festival honors outstanding films with The Gort, an award named after the robot from the movie "The Day the Earth Stood Still." Described by Quiet Earth as "probably the coolest looking award ever," The Gort was designed by Boston-based sculptor Casey Riley, inspired by one of the pioneering films featured in the festival's debut lineup. The 2012 accolade was bestowed upon "Dimensions: A-Line, A Loop, A Tangle of Threads" for being the best overall film.

In 2016, the festival introduced a new award for short films. With over 220 films submitted annually for consideration, the festival attendees, affectionately known as "thoners," are given the opportunity to vote for their favorite short film. The winning short is honored with The Short Gort during the 24-hour Marathon event that takes place on the Sunday before Presidents' Day every year.

== SF47 ==
In its 2022 iteration, dubbed SF47, the festival returned to its venue at the Somerville Theater, affectionately referred to as "The Starship Somerville." Adapting to the ongoing Covid-19 Pandemic, the event was conducted as a hybrid, combining live and virtual elements, from February 16–22, 2022. The festival concluded with the traditional 'Thon, a 24-hour science fiction movie marathon starting at noon on February 21 and ending at the same time the following day. Film submissions for the festival opened in August and continued until early January, with WithoutABox serving as the submission platform. Further details on film submissions and competition categories were made available on the festival's official website.

== See also ==
- Science fiction film
- List of fantastic and horror film festivals

=== Other sci-fi film festivals ===
- Trieste Science+Fiction Festival
- Sci-Fi-London
- International Horror and Sci-Fi Film Festival
