= Yishan Li =

British-Chinese illustrator

- Born: 1981 (age 44–45) China
- Area: Illustrator

Yishan Li (born 1981) is a Chinese-British comics and manhua illustrator. She is self-taught. Li has worked on popular comic book titles such as Hellboy, Batwoman, and Buffy the Vampire Slayer. She describes her own comics as "'girly stuff' ... ranging from historical detective dramas to young girls' adventure stories".

In 2019, Lexus UK commissioned Li and two other artists to create manga-esque artwork showcasing the company's "latest and most important cars." Li drew a woman sitting on top of a Lexus UX compact SUV, enjoying the sunset after a long day at work. She was inspired by the UX's "New Horizons" tagline.

In 2020, Li illustrated a graphic novel about Frankenstein author Mary Shelley's fictional descendant, a teenage goth girl named Mary. The American Library Association selected the comic as one of its 2021 Great Graphic Novels for Teens.

== Works ==
- New Start, Beijing Comic, China, 1999
- In My Memory, Youth Comic, China, 2002
- Our Dormitory, Comic King, China, 2003
- Snow Demon, Yaoi Press, USA, 2005
- Spirit Marked, Yaoi Press, USA, 2005
- Aluria Chronicles, Yaoi Press, USA, 2006
- Dark Mists #4, Markosia, UK, 2006
- Guardians #1, Qtk Anime, USA, 2006
- Reluctant Saviour, Yaoi Press, USA, 2006
- The Traitor, Mangaquake, UK, 2006
- The Tizzle Sisters & Erik, Markosia, UK, 2006 (coloring)
- Midnight Blue, Demented Dragon, USA, 2007
- Tribolo—L'incroyable Aventure, 70ans Loterie Romande, Switzerland, 2007
- Adventures of CG!, Cosmogirl Magazine, USA, August 2007 – May 2008, monthly
- Cutie B #1, Dargaud, France, March 2008
- Les Contes Du Boudoir Hanté #1, Delcourt, France, May 2008
- 500 Manga Creatures, Ilex, May 2008
- Call of the Deep, Barringtonstoke, May 2008
- Les Contes Du Boudoir Hanté #2, Delcourt, France, October 2008
- Cutie B #2, Dargaud, France, October 2008
- Manga Females Clip Art, Ilex Press, UK, 2009; Andrews Mcmeel, USA, 2009
- How To Draw Manga And Anime, Bridgewater Books, UK, 2009
- The Complete Shojo Art Kit, Ilex Press, UK, 2009; Watson-Guptill, USA, 2009
- Shoujo Art Studio, Watson-Guptill, USA, 2009
- Shonen Art Studio, Watson-Guptill, USA, 2009
- Les Contes Du Boudoir Hanté #3, Delcourt, France, 2010
- The Clique, Yen Press, USA, 2010
- One Million Manga Characters, Andrews Mcmeel, USA, 2010
- 500 Manga Villains And Heroes, HarperCollins, USA, 2010
- Mini Manga Series, Search Press, UK, 2010-2012
- Will Supervillains Be on the Final?, Del Rey, USA, 2011
- Accro du Shopping (comic version of Confessions of a Shopaholic), Jungle/Casterman, France, 2012
- Paradox Girl, Top Cow, USA, 2016
- Mary: The Adventures of Mary Shelley's Great-Great-Great-Great-Great-Granddaughter, Six Foot Press, USA, 2020
