= GITEX =

Computer and electronics trade show

GITEX GLOBAL
- Status: Active
- Genre: Technology; Consumer Electronics; Telecommunications
- Venue: Dubai World Trade Center
- Locations: Dubai, United Arab Emirates
- Inaugurated: 1981; 45 years ago
- Attendance: 200,000
- Organizer: Dubai World Trade Center
- Website: www.gitex.com

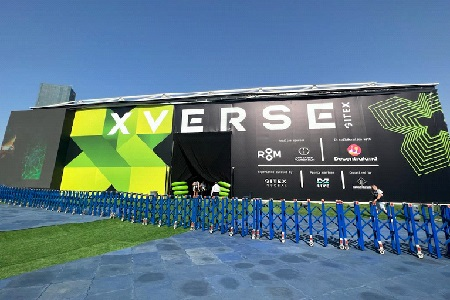
Virtual reality and gaming took centre stage at GITEX Global’s X-VERSE tent which displayed a variety of brands from the metaverse ecosystem

GITEX GLOBAL or GITEX (abb. of Gulf Information Technology Exhibition, a.k.a. GITEX Technology Week) is a computer expo held annually in Dubai, United Arab Emirates at Dubai World Trade Center. It is the MENA region's largest tech expo and the third largest ICT expo in the world.

== History ==
The show was first launched in December 1981 as the GCE ("Gulf Computer Exhibition") and occupied Hall One of the Dubai World Trade Centre. With the launch of MacWorld at the 1988 show, GCE changed its name to Gulf Information Technology Exhibition or GITEX, expanding to two halls of the exhibition centre. It now fills the entire DWTC complex, together with additional halls added to the complex, comprising 27 halls and two million feet of exhibition space.

In 2022 the name was changed to GITEX GLOBAL. This was done to distinguish the main event from other GITEX-branded regional exhibitions like GITEX ASIA, GITEX EUROPE or GITEX AFRICA.

Typically GITEX GLOBAL features various multi-tech sectors, across separate halls. Usually it will also have large-scale government presence, with hundreds of government entities and public sector officials presenting government digital initiatives, innovations and projects, announcing public and private sector tech partnerships.

In 2022, GITEX GLOBAL, organized by Dubai World Trade Centre, welcomed over 5000 companies

In 2025, GITEX GLOBAL welcomed over 6800 exhibitors and set its new attendance record. Main focus of the 2025 edition was AI but also quantum computing, biotech and data infrastructure.

== GITEX Africa ==
In October 2022, GITEX GLOBAL announced to start a new annual event outside Asia and chose Africa.

GITEX Africa is an annual technology exhibition held in Morocco. The first edition took place in Marrakesh from 31 May to 2 June 2023 and was inaugurated by the Prime Minister of Morocco, Aziz Akhannouch. It has since been established as a recurring yearly event in the country.

== GITEX Asia ==
GITEX Asia is a global tech, startup, and digital investments event held in Singapore, serving as an extension of the Dubai-based GITEX event series for the Asian market. The event is organized by KAOUN International in partnership with the Dubai World Trade Centre (DWTC).

From 23 to 25 April 2025, the first edition of GITEX AI Asia was held at the Marina Bay Sands Expo & Convention Centre in Singapore. The 2025 event featured over 400 speakers and drew participants from 110 countries, with a program focused on artificial intelligence, 5G, cybersecurity, and green technology. During the preceding GITEX Global 2024 event, Pakistan was recognized as the "Tech Destination of the Year".

The 2026 edition of GITEX AI Asia is scheduled to be held from April 9 to 10 at the Marina Bay Sands Expo & Convention Centre in Singapore. It connects enterprises, startups, investors and public-sector leaders to showcase breakthroughs in AI, Cybersecurity, Cloud, Fintech, Quantum, Telco & Data Centre, IOT, Health Tech, Smart City, Climate & Greentech solutions.

The 2nd edition brings together 550+ global enterprises and startups, 23,000+ tech executives, 250+ active investors and VCs, 110 participating countries, and 175+ influential voices in tech.

== GITEX AI Europe ==
GITEX AI Europe is an annual technology trade show and conference held in Berlin, Germany, as part of GITEX GLOBAL. The event focuses on the European technology market, specifically in the sectors of artificial intelligence (AI), cybersecurity, quantum computing, and digital infrastructure.

The event is organized by Kaoun International GmbH, the international arm of the Dubai World Trade Centre (DWTC), in partnership with Messe Berlin.
