= Dubai International Convention Centre =

Convention centers in the United Arab Emirates

Coordinates: 25°13′28″N 55°17′16″E

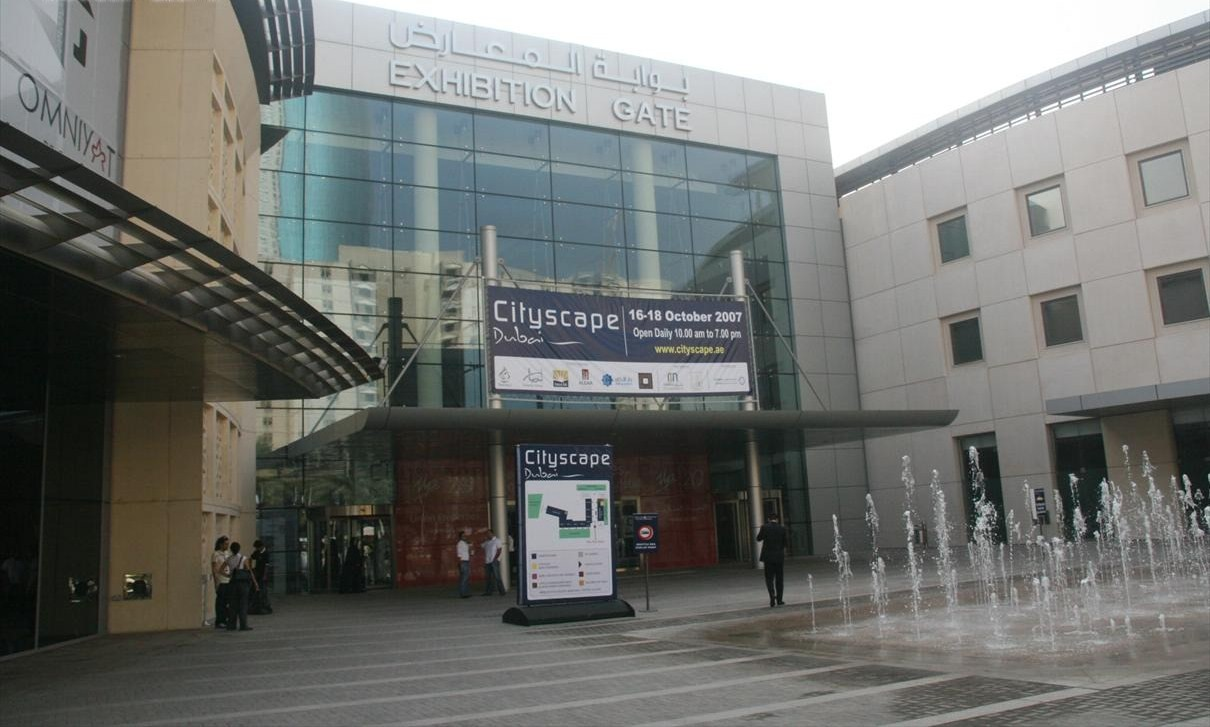
Entrance to an Exhibition Hall at the DICC

The Dubai International Exhibition and Convention Centre was built in 1979 by Sheikh Mohammed bin Rashid Al Maktoum, Vice President and Prime Minister of the UAE and Ruler of Dubai.

The complex comprises the original 39-story office tower, the World Trade Centre Residence, eight exhibition halls, the Dubai International Convention Centre, which can accommodate more than 4500 delegates in its multi-purpose hall when set in auditorium style, a business club, and residential apartments with a leisure club.

The DICC has 35,000 square metres of adjoining exhibition space.

Building Type - Convention, Exhibition, Financial
Architect - Tony Kettle
Location - Dubai, UAE

== See also ==
- List of buildings in Dubai
