= Sci-Fi-London =

Film festival based in the United Kingdom

- Official poster for the 2011 festival
- Location: London, England
- Founded: 2002
- Awards: Arthur C. Clarke Award; Best Short Film; Audience Award
- Website: sci-fi-london.com

Sci-Fi-London (SFL; stylised as SCI-FI-LONDON), also known as the London International Festival of Science Fiction and Fantastic Film, is an annual film festival held in London, England, dedicated to the science fiction and fantasy films.

Originally founded in 2002, it was held at the Stratford Picturehouse from 2008–2022, and from 2023 at the Prince Charles Cinema, the Picturehouse Central, the Garden Cinema and Rich Mix.

== Arthur C. Clarke Award ==
Sci-Fi-London hosts the awards ceremony for the Arthur C. Clarke Award. It is awarded to the best science fiction novel which received its first British publication during a calendar year, chosen by jury.

== See also ==
- List of fantastic and horror film festivals
- Trieste Science+Fiction Festival
- Boston Science Fiction Film Festival
- International Horror and Sci-Fi Film Festival
