= Dubai World Trade Centre =

- Dubai World Trade Centre

General information
- Status: Completed
- Location: Trade Centre 2, Dubai, United Arab Emirates
- Coordinates: 25°13′39.4″N 55°17′19.6″E
- Construction started: 1974
- Completed: 1979
- Inaugurated: February 26, 1979; 47 years ago by Queen Elizabeth II
- Owner: Investment Corporation of Dubai

Height
- Height: 184 m

Design and construction
- Architect: John Harris

The Dubai World Trade Centre (DWTC; Arabic: مركز دبي التجاري العالمي) is a convention and exhibition centre in Dubai, United Arab Emirates.

== History ==
The Dubai World Trade Centre was originally a single tower, constructed in 1979, and has since been expanded into a business district built around an exhibition centre complex. Originally named the Sheikh Rashid Tower and designed by John R. Harris and Partners (JRHP), the tower was inaugurated by Queen Elizabeth II on February 26, 1979. Subsequent expansions included the inauguration of Halls 1 and 2 of the Dubai International Convention and Exhibition Centre (DICEC) in 1988, followed by Hall 3. In 1996, Halls 4–8 expanded DWTC's exhibition space by approximately 27,870 square meters. In 2003, a major expansion saw the complex renamed the Dubai International Convention Exhibition Centre, along with a concourse connecting Halls 1 and 2, the Convention Tower, Novotel, and Ibis Hotels.

In 2009, a further expansion took the total exhibition floorspace to 92,900 square meters with the addition of the Sheikh Saeed halls. In 2015, the DWTC Authority was established, making the district a free zone. In 2016 the addition of the Za’abeel Halls saw a further 15,500 square meters of event space. Simultaneously, phase 1 of One Central, a commercial development in DWTC, was completed, including Offices 1 with 14,197 square meters of leasable space for businesses and multiple retail and F&B outlets. The same year marked the opening of the 588-room Ibis One Central hotel.

In 2017, phase 2 of One Central was completed, along with offices 2 and 3. This added over 69,000 square meters of combined leasable space for companies, along with numerous retail and F&B outlets and a rooftop restaurant space. In December 2018, One Central's phase 3, including Offices 4 and 5, was completed, providing more than 64,500 square meters of commercial space.

In 2021, the Dubai Exhibition Centre (DEC) was inaugurated at the Expo 2020 Dubai site. Operated by DWTC, the venue consists of two main complexes containing multiple halls and meeting facilities, with a combined capacity of over 45,000 square meters. It was initially constructed to host international events during Expo 2020 and remains in use as a large-scale convention and exhibition facility.

== DWTC Authority ==
Established in 2015, Dubai World Trade Centre Authority (DWTCA) is a free zone, home to 2,000+ companies from 40+ industries spanning construction, healthcare, IT, media, and trade. In December 2021, DWTC's mandate was expanded to include virtual assets and crypto, including digital assets, products, operators, and exchanges.
