= 2024 Women's Jordan Cup =

Tournament details
- Country: Jordan
- Teams: 6

Final positions
- Champions: Etihad
- Runners-up: Orthodox
- Third place: Al-Nasser
- Fourth place: Amman FC

Tournament statistics
- Matches played: 10
- Goals scored: 32 (3.2 per match)

The 2024 Women's Jordan Cup was the 4th season of the national football competition of Jordan. The competition started on 19 September 2024 and concluded on 1 October 2024. Etihad were crowned as champions for the first time in their history.

Al-Ahli were the defending champions, but were unable to defend their trophy from 2022. Teams from the 2024 Jordan Women's Pro League will compete for the cup.

== Format ==
6 clubs from the 2024 Jordan Women's Pro League were split into two groups of 3 teams, using a draw to create the groups. The two groups will each play a game once, for a total of two games per club.

The top two teams qualify for the semi-finals, where they play in a single-match knockout system, with penalties deciding the tiebreaker.

The losing teams will play a third-place match, while the two winning teams will meet in a final match, deciding the winner of the competition. All matches will be played at the Polo Stadium in Amman.

== Group stage ==
=== Group A ===
Pos	Team	Pld	W	D	L	GF	GA	GD	Pts	Qualification
1	Etihad	2	1	1	0	7	2	+5	4	Semi-finals
2	Orthodox	2	1	1	0	5	2	+3	4	Semi-finals
3	Al-Hussein	2	0	0	2	0	8	−8	0	

Source: jfa.jo

19 September 2024	Orthodox	3–0	Al-Hussein	Amman, Jordan
18:00	N. Anima 7'; R. Jafaru 16'; R. Jafaru 51'	Report		Stadium: Polo Stadium

22 September 2024	Etihad	5–0	Al-Hussein	Amman, Jordan
18:00	Z. Kandouci 6'; T. Ghazi 39'; H. Affak 60'; E. Al-Jamaeen 81'; J. Matouk 86'	Report		Stadium: Polo Stadium

25 September 2024	Orthodox	2–2	Etihad	Amman, Jordan
18:00	R. Jafaru 5'; N. Anima 25'	Report	N. Bouhenni 8'; N. Bouhenni 83'	Stadium: Polo Stadium

=== Group B ===
Pos	Team	Pld	W	D	L	GF	GA	GD	Pts	Qualification
1	Amman FC	2	2	0	0	7	1	+6	6	Semi-finals
2	Al-Nasser	2	1	0	1	2	2	0	3	Semi-finals
3	Istiqlal	2	0	0	2	2	8	−6	0	

Source: jfa.jo

19 September 2024	Amman FC	1–0	Al-Nasser	Amman, Jordan
18:00	T. Barghouti 39'	Report		Stadium: Polo Stadium

22 September 2024	Istiqlal	1–2	Al-Nasser	Amman, Jordan
18:00	V. Appiah 87'	Report	J. Aguadze 31'; T. Al-Qawasameh 48'	Stadium: Polo Stadium

25 September 2024	Istiqlal	1–6	Amman FC	Amman, Jordan
18:00	Y. Al-Ajrab 68'	Report	R. Al-Khashouk 12' (pen.); R. Al-Zagha 37'; A. Batayneh 58'; R. Al-Zagha 67'; N. Abdel Hadi 80'; T. Barghouti 87'	Stadium: Polo Stadium

== Semi-finals ==
28 September 2024	Etihad	2–0	Al-Nasser	Amman, Jordan
17:00	T. Ghazi 7'; H. Affak 22'	Report		Stadium: Polo Stadium

28 September 2024	Amman FC	0–2	Orthodox	Amman, Jordan
20:00		Report	N. Zoqash 44'; N. Anima 73'	Stadium: Polo Stadium

== Third-place ==
1 October 2024
18:00

Al-Nasser	1–0	Amman FC
	Report

Polo Stadium, Amman, Jordan

== Final ==
1 October 2024
18:00

Etihad	3–1	Orthodox
	Report

Polo Stadium, Amman, Jordan
