= 2025 Pink Ladies Cup squads =

List of players competing at the 2nd edition of the Pink Ladies Cup

This article lists the squads for the 2025 Pink Ladies Cup, the 2nd edition of the Pink Ladies Cup. The cup will consist of a series of friendly games, to be held in UAE from 19 to 27 February 2025. The six national teams involved in the tournament registered a squad of 26 players.

The age listed for each player is on 20 February 2025, the first day of the tournament. The numbers of caps and goals listed for each player do not include any matches played after the start of tournament. The club listed is the club for which the player last played a competitive match prior to the tournament. The nationality for each club reflects the national association (not the league) to which the club is affiliated. A flag is included for coaches that are of a different nationality than their own national team.

== Squads ==
=== India ===
Coach: Crispin Chettri

A 32-player provisional squad was announced on 2 February 2025. Two weeks later, the final 23-player squad was announced on 17 February 2025.

No.	Pos.	Player	Date of birth (age)	Caps	Goals	Club
1	GK	Elangbam Panthoi Chanu	1 February 1996 (aged 29)	18	0	(All India Football Federation) East Bengal
2	DF	Ngangbam Sweety Devi (captain)	1 December 1999 (aged 25)	58	1	(All India Football Federation) East Bengal
3	DF	Nirmala Devi Phanjoubam	2 March 2003 (aged 21)	0	0	(All India Football Federation) Sethu
4	DF	Hemam Shilky Devi	23 November 2005 (aged 19)	16	1	(All India Football Federation) Gokulam Kerala
5	DF	Purnima Kumari	10 February 2005 (aged 20)	0	0	(All India Football Federation) Sethu
6	MF	Nongmaithem Ratanbala Devi	2 December 1999 (aged 25)	38	12	(All India Football Federation) Gokulam Kerala
7	FW	Soumya Guguloth	18 January 2001 (aged 24)	31	5	(All India Football Federation) East Bengal
8	DF	Sanju Yadav	12 September 1997 (aged 27)	55	11	(All India Football Federation) Kickstart
9	FW	Sandhiya Ranganathan	20 May 1998 (aged 26)	44	10	(All India Football Federation) East Bengal
10	MF	Naorem Priyangka Devi	9 April 2003 (aged 21)	12	2	(All India Football Federation) East Bengal
11	MF	Grace Dangmei	5 February 1996 (aged 29)	82	22	(All India Football Federation) Kickstart
12	DF	Martina Thokchom	13 July 2004 (aged 20)	9	0	(All India Football Federation) Gokulam Kerala
13	GK	Payal Basude	30 September 2003 (aged 21)	1	0	(All India Football Federation) Gokulam Kerala
14	MF	Babina Lisham	1 February 2005 (aged 20)	0	0	(All India Football Federation) Sethu
15	FW	Renu Gour	16 January 2001 (aged 24)	21	4	(All India Football Federation) Kickstart
16	FW	Manisha Kalyan	27 November 2001 (aged 23)	40	10	(Hellenic Football Federation) PAOK
17	DF	Kiran Pisda	16 August 2001 (aged 23)	21	4	(All India Football Federation) Odisha
18	FW	Karishma Shirvoikar	4 August 2001 (aged 23)	10	0	(All India Football Federation) Kickstart
19	FW	Lynda Kom	28 February 2005 (aged 19)	1	4	(All India Football Federation) Odisha
20	MF	Priyadharshini Selladurai	26 February 2003 (aged 21)	0	0	(All India Football Federation) Kemp
21	MF	Mousumi Murmu	26 December 2004 (aged 20)	1	0	(All India Football Federation) Sribhumi
22	DF	Aruna Bag	27 April 2003 (aged 21)	8	0	(All India Football Federation) Kickstart
23	GK	Shreya Hooda	25 May 1999 (aged 25)	12	0	(All India Football Federation) Odisha

=== Jordan ===
Coach: Maher Abu Hantash

The final 22-player squad was announced on 15 February 2025.

No.	Pos.	Player	Date of birth (age)	Club
1	GK	Sherin Al-Shalabe	3 June 1994 (aged 30)	(Jordan Football Association) Etihad
2	DF	Taqi Ghazi	29 July 2005 (aged 19)	(Jordan Football Association) Etihad
3	DF	Alanoud Ghazi	18 May 1999 (aged 25)	(Jordan Football Association) Etihad
4	DF	Alia Hasan	17 October 2004 (aged 20)	(Jordan Football Association) Al-Nasser
6	FW	Retal Al-Shobaki		(Jordan Football Association) Istiqlal
7	DF	Nour Zoqash	1 September 1999 (aged 25)	(Jordan Football Association) Orthodox
8	MF	Enas Al-Jamaeen	11 November 2003 (aged 21)	(Jordan Football Association) Etihad
9	FW	Bana Al-Bitar	6 October 1996 (aged 28)	(Jordan Football Association) Amman FC
10	FW	Roukayah Al Fararjeh	20 June 2005 (aged 19)	(Football Australia) Blacktown Spartans
11	FW	Maysa Jbarah (captain)	20 September 1989 (aged 35)	(Saudi Arabian Football Federation) NEOM
12	GK	Rawand Kassab	6 November 2003 (aged 21)	(Saudi Arabian Football Federation) Al-Ahli
13	FW	Leen Al-Btoush	20 July 2001 (aged 23)	(Jordan Football Association) Etihad
14	MF	Yasmine Al-Ajrab	1 February 2005 (aged 20)	(Jordan Football Association) Istiqlal
15	MF	Mai Sweilem	25 September 1999 (aged 25)	(Saudi Arabian Football Federation) Al-Shabab
16	MF	Zaina Hazem	8 July 2004 (aged 20)	(Jordan Football Association) Etihad
17	DF	Rouzbahan Fraij	7 April 2000 (aged 24)	(Jordan Football Association) Etihad
19	DF	Ayah Al-Majali	9 March 1992 (aged 32)	(Saudi Arabian Football Federation) Al-Ahli
20	MF	Lana Feras	1 June 1998 (aged 26)	(Saudi Arabian Football Federation) Al-Shabab
21	DF	Rand Abu-Hussein	1 March 1997 (aged 27)	(Jordan Football Association) Amman FC
22	GK	Malak Shannak	1 August 1998 (aged 26)	(Jordan Football Association) Etihad
23	FW	Tasneem Abu-Rob	14 November 2000 (aged 24)	(Jordan Football Association) Orthodox
33	GK	Joud Al-Abadi		(Jordan Football Association) Istiqlal

=== Russia ===
Coach: Yuri Krasnozhan

The final 23-player squad was announced on 17 February 2025.

No.	Pos.	Player	Date of birth (age)	Club
1	GK	Elizaveta Shcherbakova	13 June 1997 (aged 27)	(Russian Football Union) Spartak Moscow
2	DF	Valentina Smirnova	25 October 2002 (aged 22)	(Russian Football Union) Krasnodar
3	DF	Margarita Manuilova	3 March 2000 (aged 24)	(Russian Football Union) CSKA Moscow
4	DF	Elizaveta Semenova	18 June 2004 (aged 20)	(Russian Football Union) CSKA Moscow
5	DF	Ksenia Dzhinikashvili	4 August 1997 (aged 27)	(Russian Football Union) Zenit
6	FW	Kira Petukhova	24 May 2006 (aged 18)	(Russian Football Union) Chertanovo Moscow
7	MF	Glafira Zhukova	10 August 2003 (aged 21)	(Russian Football Union) Lokomotiv Moscow
8	MF	Alina Shkalova	21 March 2005 (aged 19)	(Russian Football Union) Chertanovo Moscow
9	FW	Natalia Mashina	28 March 1997 (aged 27)	(Russian Football Union) Spartak Moscow
10	MF	Nadezhda Smirnova (captain)	22 February 1996 (aged 28)	(Russian Football Union) CSKA Moscow
11	MF	Kristina Komissarova	24 February 2001 (aged 23)	(Russian Football Union) Dynamo Moscow
12	GK	Violetta Isaykina	23 April 2004 (aged 20)	(Russian Football Union) Chertanovo Moscow
13	MF	Medea Zharkova	12 July 2003 (aged 21)	(Russian Football Union) Krasnodar
14	MF	Azalia Zalmieva	11 August 2006 (aged 18)	(Russian Football Union) Lokomotiv Moscow
15	DF	Natalia Morozova	14 October 1995 (aged 29)	(Russian Football Union) Spartak Moscow
16	MF	Darina Ishmukhametova	3 November 2005 (aged 19)	(Russian Football Union) Zenit
17	MF	Marina Fedorova	10 May 1997 (aged 27)	(Russian Football Union) Spartak Moscow
18	MF	Polina Yuklyaeva	7 November 2003 (aged 21)	(Russian Football Union) Lokomotiv Moscow
19	MF	Ksenia Dolgova	14 November 2004 (aged 20)	(Russian Football Union) Lokomotiv Moscow
20	FW	Elena Shesterneva	18 December 1999 (aged 25)	(Russian Football Union) Dynamo Moscow
21	GK	Yulia Grichenko	10 March 1990 (aged 34)	(Russian Football Union) Zenit
22	MF	Valeria Khokhlova	21 February 1999 (aged 25)	(Russian Football Union) Zenit
25	DF	Yulia Pleshkova	15 January 2002 (aged 23)	(Russian Football Union) CSKA Moscow

=== South Korea ===
Coach: Shin Sang-woo

The final 26-player squad was announced on 10 February 2025. Two days later, Jang Sel-gi withdrew due to a hip injury and was replaced by Hong Hye-ji.

No.	Pos.	Player	Date of birth (age)	Club
1	GK	Kim Kyung-hee	17 March 2003 (aged 21)	(Korea Football Association) Suwon FC
2	DF	Kim Jin-hee	7 October 1998 (aged 26)	(Korea Football Association) Gyeongju KHNP
3	DF	Jo Min-ah		(Korea Football Association) Sejong Sportstoto
4	DF	Seo In-gyeong		(Korea Football Association) Mungyeong Sangmu
5	DF	Lee Yu-jin	15 May 2000 (aged 24)	(Korea Football Association) Suwon FC
6	DF	Lim Seon-joo	27 November 1990 (aged 34)	(Korea Football Association) Incheon Hyundai Steel Red Angels
7	DF	Shin Na-yeong	9 October 1999 (aged 25)	(United States Soccer Federation) Lexington SC
8	MF	Kim Shin-ji	3 May 2004 (aged 20)	(Italian Football Federation) Roma
9	FW	Choi Yoo-jung	25 January 1992 (aged 33)	(Korea Football Association) Hwacheon KSPO
10	MF	Ji So-yun	21 February 1991 (aged 33)	(United States Soccer Federation) Seattle Reign
11	FW	Choe Yu-ri	16 September 1994 (aged 30)	(The Football Association) Birmingham City
12	DF	Lee Deok-ju	26 December 2000 (aged 24)	(Korea Football Association) Incheon Hyundai Steel Red Angels
13	FW	Moon Eun-joo		(Korea Football Association) Hwacheon KSPO
14	FW	Choi Da-kyung		(Korea Football Association) Incheon Hyundai Steel Red Angels
15	MF	Kim Myeong-jin	31 January 1995 (aged 30)	(Korea Football Association) Incheon Hyundai Steel Red Angels
16	DF	Hong Hye-ji	25 August 1996 (aged 28)	(Canadian Soccer Association) AFC Toronto
17	MF	Lee Young-ju	22 April 1992 (aged 32)	(Royal Spanish Football Federation) Levante Badalona
18	GK	Ryu Ji-soo	3 September 1997 (aged 27)	(Korea Football Association) Sejong Sportstoto
19	MF	Lee Geum-min	7 April 1994 (aged 30)	(The Football Association) Birmingham City
20	DF	Kim Hye-ri (captain)	25 June 1990 (aged 34)	(Chinese Football Association) Wuhan Jianghan University
21	GK	Kim Min-jeong	12 September 1996 (aged 28)	(Korea Football Association) Incheon Hyundai Steel Red Angels
22	FW	Choo Hyo-joo	29 July 2000 (aged 24)	(Canadian Soccer Association) Ottawa Rapid
23	FW	Park Ah-yeon		(Korea Football Association) Incheon Hyundai Steel Red Angels
24	MF	Bae Ye-bin	7 December 2004 (aged 20)	(Korea Football Association) Incheon Hyundai Steel Red Angels
25	FW	Choi Han-bin	2 March 2004 (aged 20)	(Korea Football Association) Korea University
26	FW	Jeong Da-bin	5 September 2005 (aged 19)	(Korea Football Association) Korea University

=== Thailand ===
Coach: (Japan) Futoshi Ikeda

A 29-player provisional squad was announced on 17 January 2025. An updated 30-player provisional squad was announced on 7 February 2025. The final 23-player squad was announced on 18 February 2025.

No.	Pos.	Player	Date of birth (age)	Club
1	GK	Tiffany Sornpao	22 May 1998 (aged 26)	(Danish Football Association) Brøndby
2	DF	Kanjanaporn Saenkhun	18 July 1996 (aged 28)	(Football Association of Thailand) BGC Bundit Asia
3	DF	Supaporn Intaraprasit	18 February 2004 (aged 21)	(Football Association of Thailand) Chonburi
4	DF	Saranya Lamee	30 June 2004 (aged 20)	(Football Association of Thailand) BGC Bundit Asia
5	MF	Chatchawan Rodthong	22 June 2002 (aged 22)	(Football Association of Thailand) Bangkok
6	DF	Tamonwan Raksaphakdi	24 February 2000 (aged 24)	(Football Association of Thailand) BGC Bundit Asia
8	MF	Nipawan Panyosuk (captain)	15 March 1995 (aged 29)	(Football Association of Thailand) Chonburi
9	MF	Sirikan Phayaknet	11 June 1998 (aged 26)	(Football Association of Thailand) Bangkok
10	FW	Taneekarn Dangda	15 December 1992 (aged 32)	(Japan Football Association) AC Nagano Parceiro
11	DF	Parichat Thongrong	14 May 2006 (aged 18)	(Football Association of Thailand) Nakhon Si Thammarat Sports School
12	MF	Pluemjai Sontisawat	20 July 2003 (aged 21)	(Football Association of Thailand) Chonburi
13	MF	Pichayatida Manowang	17 November 2006 (aged 18)	(Football Association of Thailand) Bangkok
14	FW	Saowalak Peng-ngam	30 November 1996 (aged 28)	(Chinese Taipei Football Association) Taichung Blue Whale
15	MF	Thanchanok Jansri	24 December 2004 (aged 20)	(Football Association of Thailand) Chonburi
16	FW	Kanchanathat Poomsri	17 January 2003 (aged 22)	(Football Association of Thailand) Kasem Bundit University
17	FW	Jiraporn Mongkoldee	13 August 1998 (aged 26)	(Chinese Football Association) Guangxi Pingguo
18	GK	Thichanan Sodchuen	1 February 2003 (aged 22)	(Football Association of Thailand) BGC Bundit Asia
19	DF	Panitha Jiratanaphibun	27 June 2004 (aged 20)	(Chinese Football Association) Guangxi Pingguo
20	DF	Orawan Keereesuwannakul	30 June 1997 (aged 27)	(Football Association of Thailand) Chonburi
21	MF	Pattaranan Aupachai	9 July 2002 (aged 22)	(Football Association of Thailand) Chonburi
22	GK	Yada Sengyong	10 September 1993 (aged 31)	(Football Association of Thailand) Nakhon Si Thammarat Sports School
23	FW	Janista Jinantuya	9 September 2003 (aged 21)	(Football Association of Thailand) Bangkok
25	DF	Uraiporn Yongkul	17 August 1998 (aged 26)	(Football Association of Thailand) BGC Bundit Asia

=== Uzbekistan ===
Coach: (Lithuania) Kotryna Kulbytė

The final 23-player squad was announced on 14 February 2025.

No.	Pos.	Player	Date of birth (age)	Club
1	GK	Maftuna Jonimqulova	26 July 1999 (aged 25)	(Uzbekistan Football Association) Sevinch
5	DF	Nafisa Nabikulova	20 June 2000 (aged 24)	(Uzbekistan Football Association) Sogdiana Jizzakh
6	MF	Dilrabo Asadova	22 December 1996 (aged 28)	(Uzbekistan Football Association) Sogdiana Jizzakh
7	FW	Nilufar Kudratova	5 June 1997 (aged 27)	(Uzbekistan Football Association) Sevinch
10	FW	Diyorakhon Khabibullaeva (captain)	15 September 1999 (aged 25)	(Turkish Football Federation) Trabzonspor
11	MF	Maftuna Shoyimova	1 January 1999 (aged 26)	(Uzbekistan Football Association) Sevinch
15	MF	Umida Zoirova	22 April 1998 (aged 26)	(Uzbekistan Football Association) Bunyodkor
16	MF	Zarina Mamatkarimova	4 March 2004 (aged 20)	(Uzbekistan Football Association) Sogdiana Jizzakh
19	MF	Nozimakhon Ergasheva	23 January 2001 (aged 24)	(Uzbekistan Football Association) Bunyodkor
21	DF	Leyla Oraniyazova	18 October 2004 (aged 20)	(Uzbekistan Football Association) Sevinch
22	DF	Sevinch Kuchkorova	28 September 2004 (aged 20)	(Uzbekistan Football Association) AGMK
	GK	Zarina Saidova	19 September 2001 (aged 23)	(Uzbekistan Football Association) Bunyodkor
	GK	Kumushoy Gulomova	6 November 1999 (aged 25)	(Uzbekistan Football Association) Sogdiana Jizzakh
	DF	Madina Khikmatova	9 August 2001 (aged 23)	(Uzbekistan Football Association) Sogdiana Jizzakh
	FW	Mekhribon Egamberdieva	9 October 2007 (aged 17)	(Uzbekistan Football Association) Sevinch
	FW	Feruza Bobokhujaeva	5 October 1999 (aged 25)	(Uzbekistan Football Association) Sevinch
	FW	Lyudmila Karachik	8 December 1994 (aged 30)	(Uzbekistan Football Association) Bunyodkor
	MF	Asalkhon Aminjonova	22 April 2007 (aged 17)	(Uzbekistan Football Association) AGMK
	DF	Rukhshona Olimjonova	28 November 2005 (aged 19)	(Uzbekistan Football Association) AGMK
	FW	Dilnura Mamatkulova	16 October 2007 (aged 17)	(Uzbekistan Football Association) Sogdiana Jizzakh
		Nazira Sayfutdinova		
	FW	Shahnoza Dekanbaeva	18 January 2008 (aged 17)	
	FW	Zarina Norboeva	16 January 2006 (aged 19)	(Uzbekistan Football Association) Sevinch

== Player representation ==
=== By club ===
Clubs with four or more players represented are listed.

Players	Club
8	(Jordan) Etihad
7	(South Korea) Incheon Hyundai Steel Red Angels, (Uzbekistan) Sevinch
6	(Thailand) Chonburi, (Uzbekistan) Sogdiana Jizzakh
5	(India) East Bengal, (India) Kickstart, (Thailand) BGC Bundit Asia
4	(India) Gokulam Kerala, (Russia) CSKA Moscow, (Russia) Lokomotiv Moscow, (Russia) Spartak Moscow, (Russia) Zenit, (Thailand) Bangkok, (Uzbekistan) Bunyodkor

=== By club nationality ===
Players	Clubs
23	Russia
22	India
20	Uzbekistan
18	Thailand
17	South Korea
16	Jordan
5	Saudi Arabia
3	China
2	Canada, England, United States
1	Australia, Chinese Taipei, Denmark, Greece, Italy, Japan, Spain, Turkey

=== By club federation ===
Players	Federation
104	AFC
30	UEFA
4	CONCACAF

=== By representatives of domestic league ===
National squad	Players
Russia	23
India	22
Uzbekistan	20
Thailand	18
South Korea	17
Jordan	16
