= 2026–27 Women's Jordan Cup =

Jordan Football tournament season 5

Tournament details
- Country: Jordan
- Teams: 6

Tournament statistics
- Matches played: 8
- Goals scored: 25 (3.13 per match)
- All statistics correct as of 5 November 2026.

The 2026–27 Women's Jordan Cup is the 6th season of the national football competition of Jordan. The competition began on 1 September 2026 and is planned to conclude on 25 January 2026.

Etihad are the defending champions of the competition, after winning the 2025 Women's Jordan Cup.

== Format ==
6 clubs from the 2026–27 Jordan Women's Pro League were split into two groups of 3 teams, using a draw to create the groups. The two groups will each play a game once, for a total of two games per club.

The top two teams would qualify to the semi-finals, where they played in a single-match knockout system, with penalties deciding the tiebreaker.

The losing teams would play a third-place match, while the two winning teams would have met in a final match, deciding the winner of the competition. All matches were played at the Polo Stadium in Amman.

== Group stage ==
=== Group A ===
Pos	Team	Pld	W	D	L	GF	GA	GD	Pts	Qualification
1	Etihad	3	3	0	0	14	1	+13	9	Semi-finals
2	Al-Nasser	3	0	1	2	3	6	−3	1	Semi-finals
3	Istiqlal	2	0	1	1	2	12	−10	1	

Updated to match(es) played on 4 November 2026. Source: jfa.jo

=== Group B ===
Pos	Team	Pld	W	D	L	GF	GA	GD	Pts	Qualification
1	Amman FC	3	1	2	0	2	1	+1	5	Semi-finals
2	Nashama Al-Mustaqbal	3	1	1	1	3	3	0	4	Semi-finals
3	Orthodox	2	0	1	1	1	2	−1	1	

Updated to match(es) played on 5 November 2026. Source: jfa.jo
