= 2025 Women's Jordan Cup =

Jordan Football tournament season 5

Tournament details
- Country: Jordan
- Teams: 6 (5 as of 8 November 2025)

Final positions
- Champions: Etihad
- Runners-up: Amman FC
- Third place: Orthodox
- Fourth place: Istiqlal

Tournament statistics
- Matches played: 12
- Goals scored: 59 (4.92 per match)

The 2025 Women's Jordan Cup was the 5th season of the national football competition of Jordan. The competition began on 1 September 2025 and concluded on 31 January 2026.

Etihad were the defending champions of the competition, after winning the 2024 Women's Jordan Cup. Etihad won their second cup trophy in a row by defeating Amman FC 5–0.

== Format ==
6 clubs from the 2025–26 Jordan Women's Pro League were split into two groups of 3 teams, using a draw to create the groups. The two groups each played one game, for a total of two games per club.

The top two teams then qualified to the semi-finals, where they played in a single-match knockout system, with penalties deciding the tiebreaker.

The losing teams then played a third-place match, while the two winning teams met in a final match, deciding the winner of the competition. All matches were played at the Polo Stadium in Amman.

== Group stage ==
=== Group A ===
Pos	Team	Pld	W	D	L	GF	GA	GD	Pts	Qualification
1	Amman FC	4	3	1	0	11	2	+9	10	Semi-finals
2	Etihad	4	2	1	1	13	3	+10	7	Semi-finals
3	Nashama Al-Mustaqbal	4	0	0	4	2	21	−19	0	

Source: jfa.jo

=== Group B ===
Pos	Team	Pld	W	D	L	GF	GA	GD	Pts	Qualification
1	Istiqlal	2	1	1	0	3	2	+1	4	Semi-finals
2	Orthodox	2	0	1	1	2	3	−1	1	Semi-finals
3	Al-Hussein	0	0	0	0	0	0	0	0	Withdrew

Source: jfa.jo

== Semi-finals ==
21 January 2026	Amman FC	3–2	Orthodox	Amman, Jordan
17:00	Katungwa 9'; Zoqash 78'; Al-Barghouthy 90+2'	Report	Khalil 36'; Al-Zagha 43'	Stadium: Polo Stadium

22 January 2026	Istiqlal	1–8	Etihad	Amman, Jordan
17:00	Al-Shobaki 45+3' (pen.)	Report	Hazem 10' (pen.), 55'; Anima 15', 17', 18', 43', 75'; Al-Ajrab 20'	Stadium: Polo Stadium

== Third-place ==
30 January 2026	Orthodox	6–3	Istiqlal	Amman, Jordan
17:00	Appiah 18', 51'; Al Kasti 20', 40', 80' (pen.), 86'	Report	Kuzagbe 29'; Kuruwaa 41'; Nyame 53'	Stadium: Polo Stadium; Referee: Osama Hassan (JOR)

== Final ==
31 January 2026	Amman FC	0–5	Etihad	Amman, Jordan
17:00		Report	Anima 35', 46'; Al-Saheb 73'; Al-Ajrab 85'; Sweilem 90' (pen.)	Stadium: Polo Stadium; Referee: Mohammad Bani Hani (JOR)
