= 2023 Jordanian-Saudi Women's Clubs Championship =

أندية السيدات السعودية والأردن 2023

Tournament details
- Host country: Jordan
- City: Amman
- Dates: 23–30 August
- Teams: 8 (from 1 sub-confederation)
- Venue: 1 (in 1 host city)

Final positions
- Champions: (Jordan) Etihad (1st title)
- Runners-up: (Jordan) Amman FC
- Third place: (Saudi Arabia) Al Nassr
- Fourth place: (Jordan) Orthodox Club

Tournament statistics
- Matches played: 16
- Goals scored: 51 (3.19 per match)
- Top scorer(s): (Ghana) Mary Boateng (AMA) (Lebanon) Lili Iskandar (ETH) (4 goals each)
- Best player: (Jordan) Bana Al-Bitar (AMA)
- Fair play award: (Jordan) Orthodox Club

2023 Jordanian-Saudi Women's Clubs Championship was the first edition of the Jordanian-Saudi Women's Clubs Championship, organized by collaboration between the Jordan Football Association and the Saudi Arabian Football Federation. Etihad Club, the title holder of the Jordan's Pro League secured the title, becoming the first team to claim the championship.

== Teams ==
Eight clubs were selected to participate in the tournament, determined by their performance in the preceding season of the Jordan Women's Pro League and Saudi Women's Premier League. The top four teams from each league secured qualification for the competition.

from the Jordan Pro League
Pos	Club	App.	Best	Notes
1	Etihad	1st	—N/a	
2	Orthodox Club	1st	—N/a	
3	Amman FC	1st	—N/a	
4	Al-Nasser	1st	—N/a	

from the Saudi Premier League
Pos	Club	App.	Best	Notes
1	Al Nassr	1st	—N/a	
2	Al Hilal	1st	—N/a	
3	Al-Shabab	1st	—N/a	
5	Al-Ittihad	1st	—N/a	

=== Draw ===
The final draw was held on 2 August 2023, As per the tournament regulations the teams shall be allocated into two groups. The first group comprises the top and third-ranked teams from the Jordanian Pro League, alongside the second and fourth-placed teams from the Saudi Premier League. Meanwhile, the second group accommodates teams securing the second and fourth positions in the Jordanian Men's Professional League, as well as the first and third positions in the Saudi Premier League. The groups were confirmed following the draw:

Group A
Pos	Team
A1	(Jordan) Etihad
A2	(Saudi Arabia) Al Hilal
A3	(Jordan) Amman FC
A4	(Saudi Arabia) Al-Ittihad

Group B
Pos	Team
B1	(Saudi Arabia) Al Nassr
B2	(Jordan) Orthodox Club
B3	(Saudi Arabia) Al-Shabab
B4	(Jordan) Al-Nasser

== Group stage ==
The official match schedule was confirmed on 15 August 2023.

=== Group A ===
Pos	Team	Pld	W	D	L	GF	GA	GD	Pts	Qualification
1	(Jordan) Etihad	3	2	1	0	8	3	+5	7	Advance to knockout stage
2	(Jordan) Amman FC	3	2	0	1	7	7	0	6	Advance to knockout stage
3	(Saudi Arabia) Al Hilal	3	1	1	1	4	3	+1	4	
4	(Saudi Arabia) Al-Ittihad	3	0	0	3	2	8	−6	0	

Source: JFA and SAFF
Rules for classification: Group stage tiebreakers
23 August 2023
17:00

Amman FC (Jordan)	2–1	(Saudi Arabia) Al Hilal
Boateng 16'; Isaawi 45'	Report	Nooraldin 36'

King Abdullah II Stadium, Amman
Referee: Anoud Al Asmari (Saudi Arabia)
23 August 2023
20:30

Al-Ittihad (Saudi Arabia)	0–3	(Jordan) Etihad
	Report	Fraij 22'; L. Iskandar 43'; Al-Ghamdi 79' (o.g.)

King Abdullah II Stadium, Amman

25 August 2023
17:00

Amman FC (Jordan)	2–4	(Jordan) Etihad
Boateng 21'; Barghouthi 30'	Report	L. Iskandar 2', 27'; Fraij 42'; Al-Btoush 72'

King Abdullah II Stadium, Amman
25 August 2023
20:00

Al-Ittihad (Saudi Arabia)	0–2	(Saudi Arabia) Al Hilal
	Report	Nooraldin 14'; Al-Hamli 25'

King Abdullah II Stadium, Amman

27 August 2023
17:00

Al Hilal (Saudi Arabia)	1–1	(Jordan) Etihad
Addo 90+5'		L. Iskandar 43'

King Abdullah II Stadium, Amman
27 August 2023
20:00

Al-Ittihad (Saudi Arabia)	2–3	(Jordan) Amman FC
Mustafa 27'; Tarek 70'		Al-Bitar 8'; Tarek 45+1' (o.g.); Silawi 85'

King Abdullah II Stadium, Amman

=== Group B ===
Pos	Team	Pld	W	D	L	GF	GA	GD	Pts	Qualification
1	(Saudi Arabia) Al Nassr	3	2	0	1	5	4	+1	6	Advance to knockout stage
2	(Jordan) Orthodox Club	3	2	0	1	8	6	+2	6	Advance to knockout stage
3	(Saudi Arabia) Al-Shabab	3	1	0	2	6	7	−1	3	
4	(Jordan) Al-Nasser	3	1	0	2	4	6	−2	3	

Source: JFA and SAFF
Rules for classification: Group stage tiebreakers
24 August 2023
17:00

Al-Nasser (Jordan)	2–1	(Saudi Arabia) Al Nassr
Torkudor 7'; Salha 49'	Report	Hamad 61'

King Abdullah II Stadium, Amman
24 August 2023
20:00

Al-Shabab (Saudi Arabia)	3–4	(Jordan) Orthodox Club
Chikwelu 60', 63'; Altuve 88'	Report	Anima 50', 90+1'; Jafaru 9', 19'

King Abdullah II Stadium, Amman

26 August 2023
17:00

Al-Shabab (Saudi Arabia)	1–2	(Saudi Arabia) Al Nassr
Abdulmohsen 84'		Boussaha 7'; Izabela 78'

King Abdullah II Stadium, Amman
26 August 2023
20:00

Al-Nasser (Jordan)	1–3	(Jordan) Orthodox Club
M. Owaisat 18'	Report	Al-Momani 5'; Abrafi 41', 83'

King Abdullah II Stadium, Amman

28 August 2023
17:00

Al-Nasser (Jordan)	1–2	(Saudi Arabia) Al-Shabab
M. Owaisat 6'		Altuve 30', 90+9'

King Abdullah II Stadium, Amman
28 August 2023
20:00

Orthodox Club (Jordan)	1–2	(Saudi Arabia) Al Nassr
Al-Omari 45+7'		Boussaha 67'; Abdulwasi 82'

King Abdullah II Stadium, Amman

== knockout stage ==
- In the knockout stage, penalty shoot-out will be used to decide the winner if necessary.

=== Bracket ===
Semi-finals
30 August – Amman
(Jordan) Etihad (p)	0 (5)
(Jordan) Orthodox Club	0 (3)
30 August – Amman
(Saudi Arabia) Al Nassr	0
(Jordan) Amman FC	4

Final
1 September – Amman
(Jordan) Etihad	2
(Jordan) Amman FC
Third Place match
1 September – Amman
(Jordan) Orthodox Club	0
(Saudi Arabia) Al Nassr	1

=== Semi-finals ===
30 August 2023
17:00

Etihad (Jordan)	0–0	(Jordan) Orthodox Club
Penalties
L. Iskandar (penalty scored); Ansah (penalty scored); Mahmoud (penalty scored); Fraij (penalty scored); Feras (penalty scored)	5–3	Al-Hyasat (penalty scored); Anima (penalty scored); Jafaru (penalty missed); Al-Momani (penalty scored)

King Abdullah II Stadium, Amman
30 August 2023
20:00

Al Nassr (Saudi Arabia)	0–4	(Jordan) Amman FC
		Boateng 9', 77'; Al-Bitar 15'; Jbarah 38' (o.g.)

King Abdullah II Stadium, Amman

=== Third Place match ===
1 September 2023
17:00

Orthodox Club (Jordan)	0–1	(Saudi Arabia) Al Nassr
	Report (AFC)	Boussaha 80'

King Abdullah II Stadium, Amman

=== Final ===
1 September 2023
20:00

Etihad (Jordan)	2–1	(Jordan) Amman FC
Hazem 7'; Zoqash 62'	Report (AFC)	Al-Bitar 61'

King Abdullah II Stadium, Amman

== Goalscorers ==
Team eliminated / inactive for this round.

Rank	Player	Team	MD1	MD2	MD3	SFN	3RD	FNL	Total
1	(Ghana) Mary Boateng	(Jordan) Amman FC	1	1		2			4
1	(Lebanon) Lili Iskandar	(Jordan) Etihad	1	2	1				4
2	(Algeria) Lina Boussaha	(Saudi Arabia) Al Nassr		1	1		1		3
2	(Venezuela) Oriana Altuve	(Saudi Arabia) Al-Shabab	1		2				3
2	(Jordan) Bana Al-Bitar	(Jordan) Amman FC			1	1		1	3
3	(Jordan) Rouzbahan Fraij	(Jordan) Etihad	1	1					2
3	(Iraq) Shokhan Nooraldin	(Saudi Arabia) Al Hilal	1	1					2
3	(Nigeria) Rita Chikwelu	(Saudi Arabia) Al-Shabab	2						2
3	(Jordan) Maya Owaisat	(Jordan) Al-Nasser		1	1				2
3	(Ghana) Naomi Anima	(Jordan) Orthodox	2						2
3	(Ghana) Rahama Jafaru	(Jordan) Orthodox	2						2
3	(Ghana) Sarah Abrafi	(Jordan) Orthodox		2					2
4	(Jordan) Jana Issawi	(Jordan) Amman FC	1						1
4	(Jordan) Tala Barghouthi	(Jordan) Amman FC		1					1
4	(Jordan) Rama Silawi	(Jordan) Amman FC			1				1
4	(Saudi Arabia) Dalal Abdulwasi	(Saudi Arabia) Al Nassr			1				1
4	(Saudi Arabia) Sara Hamad	(Saudi Arabia) Al Nassr	1						1
4	(Brazil) Izabela Stahelin	(Saudi Arabia) Al Nassr		1					1
4	(Ghana) Elizabeth Addo	(Saudi Arabia) Al Hilal			1				1
4	(Saudi Arabia) Noura Al-Hamli	(Saudi Arabia) Al Hilal		1					1
4	(Sweden) Nor Mustafa	(Saudi Arabia) Al-Ittihad			1				1
4	(Saudi Arabia) Joury Tarek	(Saudi Arabia) Al-Ittihad			1				1
4	(Saudi Arabia) Moudi Abdulmohsen	(Saudi Arabia) Al-Shabab	2						1
4	(Jordan) Zaina Hazem	(Jordan) Etihad						1	1
4	(Jordan) Nour Zoqash	(Jordan) Etihad						1	1
4	(Ghana) Fredrica Torkudor	(Jordan) Al-Nasser	1						1
4	(Lebanon) Syntia Salha	(Jordan) Al-Nasser	1						1
4	(Jordan) Luna Al-Momani	(Jordan) Orthodox		1					1
4	(Jordan) Lama Al-Omari	(Jordan) Orthodox			1				1
