= 2026–27 Jordan Women's Pro League =

Jordan Women's Pro League
- Season: 2026–27
- Dates: 11 September 2026 – 31 January 2027
- Matches: 24
- Goals: 76 (3.17 per match)
- All statistics correct as of 17 November 2026.

The 2026–27 Jordan Women's Pro League is the 19th season of the Jordan Women's Pro League, the top-level of women's football in Jordan.

The league started on 11 September 2026 and is planned to conclude on 31 January 2027.

== Format ==
The league initially consists of three stages, with every team contesting against each other three times. Once the first three stages conclude, an additional "Golden Phase" will take place. The team with the highest cumulative points at the very end wins the league.

== Teams ==
6 teams contested the 2026–27 Jordan Women's Pro League season. 5 from the previous season participated, as well as the 2025 Jordan Women's First Division League champions Al-Nasser, who replace Al-Hussein, who withdrew from the previous season.

Locations of the 2025–26 Jordan Women's Pro League teams

Team	Location	Ground	Capacity	2026–27 Season
Al-Nasser	Amman	Polo Stadium	2,000	1st (promoted)
Amman FC	Amman	Polo Stadium	2,000	2nd
Etihad	Amman	Polo Stadium	2,000	1st
Istiqlal	Amman	Polo Stadium	2,000	4th
Nashama Al-Mustaqbal	Amman	Polo Stadium	2,000	3rd
Orthodox	Amman	Polo Stadium	2,000	5th

== Foreign players ==
Club	Player 1	Player 2	Player 3	Player 4	Player 5	Player 6	Former players
Al-Nasser							
Amman FC							
Etihad							
Istiqlal	(Algeria) Randa Mehnatel	(Algeria) Besma Benlakhlef	(Algeria) Kenza Hadjar				
Nashama Al-Mustaqbal	(India) Ruchi Yadav						
Orthodox							

== League table ==
Pos	Team	Pld	W	D	L	GF	GA	GD	Pts	Promotion or relegation
1	Etihad	8	7	0	1	19	7	+12	21	Qualification for the 2027–28 AFC Women's Champions League
2	Amman FC	8	6	1	1	21	6	+15	19	
3	Nashama Al-Mustaqbal	8	4	1	3	16	10	+6	13	
4	Al-Nasser	8	3	1	4	12	11	+1	10	
5	Orthodox	8	1	1	6	6	14	−8	4	
6	Istiqlal	8	1	0	7	2	28	−26	3	Relegation to Jordan Women's First Division League

Updated to match(es) played on 17 November 2026. Source:
Rules for classification: 1) points; 2) goal difference; 3) number of goals scored.
