= 2022 Jordan Women's Pro League =

Jordan Women's Pro League
- Season: 2022
- Dates: 6 July 2022 – 30 November 2022
- Champions: Al-Ahli (1st title)
- Matches: 30
- Goals: 97 (3.23 per match)
- Top goalscorer: Mai Sweilem (Al-Ahli) (11 goals)
- All statistics correct as of 30 November 2022.

The 2022 Jordan Women's Pro League was the 15th season of the Jordan Women's Pro League, the top-level women's football league in Jordan. Al-Ahli were crowned champions for the first time in their history.

The league started on 6 July 2022 and concluded on 30 November 2022.

== Teams ==
5 teams will contest the 2022 Women's Pro League Season. 3 from the previous season, as well as the newly promoted Etihad and Al-Nasser, who replaced Al-Qadsiyah and last season's league winners Amman.

Locations of the 2024 Jordan Women's Pro League teams

Team	Location	Ground	Capacity	2022 Season
Al-Ahli	Amman	Polo Stadium	2,000	N/A
Al-Nasser	Amman	Polo Stadium	2,000	4th
Istiqlal	Amman	Polo Stadium	2,000	5th
Etihad Club	Amman	Polo Stadium	2,000	2nd
Orthodox Club	Amman	Polo Stadium	2,000	3rd

== League table ==
Pos	Team	Pld	W	D	L	GF	GA	GD	Pts	Promotion or relegation
1	Al-Ahli (C)	12	9	1	2	38	8	+30	28	Champions
2	Etihad	12	8	2	2	26	11	+15	26	
3	Orthodox Club	12	7	1	4	24	9	+15	22	
4	Al-Nasser	12	1	2	9	6	29	−23	5	
5	Istiqlal	12	1	2	9	3	40	−37	5	

Rules for classification: 1) points; 2) goal difference; 3) number of goals scored.
(C) Champions

== Statistics ==
=== Top goalscorers ===
As of 30 November 2022

Rank	Player	Team	Goals
1	(Jordan) Mai Sweilem	Al-Ahli	11
2	(Ghana) Veronica Appiah	Etihad	10
3	(Jordan) Bana Al-Bitar	Al-Ahli	8
4	(Jordan) Natasha Al-Naber	Al-Ahli	6
4	(Jordan) Raya Hina	Al-Ahli	6
5	(Lebanon) Lili Iskandar	Etihad	5
5	(Jordan) Tala Al-Barghouthy	Orthodox	5
