= 2022 Women's Jordan Cup =

Tournament details
- Country: Jordan
- Teams: 6

Final positions
- Champions: Al-Ahli
- Runners-up: Etihad
- Third place: Istiqlal
- Fourth place: Amman FC

Tournament statistics
- Matches played: 10
- Goals scored: 32 (3.2 per match)

The 2022 Women's Jordan Cup was the 3rd season of the national football competition of Jordan. The competition started on 5 December 2022 and concluded on 13 December 2022. Al-Ahli were crowned as champions for the first time in their history.

Shabab Al-Ordon were the defending champions, but were unable to defend their trophy from 2019.

== Format ==
The 2022 Women's Jordan Cup consisted of six clubs from the 2022 Jordan Women's Pro League participating in a draw, which was held on 29 November 2022 to decide the quarter-finals bracket. Istiqlal and Amman FC would automatically qualify to the semi-finals according to the draw.

The winners of the quarter-finals would reach to the semi-finals, based on a single-match knockout system, with penalties deciding the tiebreaker. All matches were broadcast on the Jordan Football Association's YouTube channel.

The losing semi-finalists will play a third-place match, while the two winning teams will meet in a final match, deciding the winner of the competition. All matches were played at the Polo Stadium in Amman.

== Quarter-finals ==
5 December 2022	Al-Ahli	3–0	Al-Nasser	Amman, Jordan
18:00		Report		Stadium: Polo Stadium

6 December 2022	Orthodox	0–3	Etihad	Amman, Jordan
18:00		Report		Stadium: Polo Stadium

== Semi-finals ==
9 December 2022	Al-Ahli	11–1	Amman FC	Amman, Jordan
15:00		Report		Stadium: Polo Stadium

9 December 2022	Istiqlal	1–5	Etihad	Amman, Jordan
18:00		Report		Stadium: Polo Stadium

== Third-place ==
12 December 2022
18:00

Amman FC	1–3	Istiqlal
	Report

Polo Stadium, Amman, Jordan

== Final ==
13 December 2022
18:00

Al-Ahli	1–0	Etihad
	Report

Polo Stadium, Amman, Jordan
