= 2024 Jordan Women's Pro League =

Jordan Women's Pro League
- Season: 2024
- Dates: 17 May 2024 – 13 September 2024
- Champions: Etihad (2nd title)
- Relegated: Al-Nasser
- AFC Champions League: Etihad
- Matches: 45
- Goals: 159 (3.53 per match)
- Top goalscorer: Naïma Bouhenni (Etihad) (26 goals)
- All statistics correct as of 29 August 2024.

The 2024 Jordan Women's Pro League was the 17th season of the Jordan Women's Pro League, the top-level women's football league in Jordan.

The league started on 17 May 2024 and concluded on 17 September 2024.

== Teams ==
6 teams contested the 2024 Women's Pro League Season. 5 from the previous season, as well as Al-Hussein.

Locations of the 2024 Jordan Women's Pro League teams

Team	Location	Ground	Capacity	2023 Season
Al-Hussein	Irbid	Polo Stadium	2,000	N/A
Al-Nasser	Amman	Polo Stadium	2,000	4th
Amman FC	Amman	Polo Stadium	2,000	3rd
Istiqlal	Amman	Polo Stadium	2,000	5th
Etihad	Amman	Polo Stadium	2,000	1st
Orthodox	Amman	Polo Stadium	2,000	2nd

== Foreign players ==
Club	Player 1	Player 2	Player 3	Player 4	Former players
Al-Hussein					
Al-Nasser	(Ghana) Juanita Aguadze	(Ghana) Rabi Musa			
Amman FC	(Ghana) Constance Achia	(Ghana) Joyce Larbi			
Etihad	(Algeria) Houria Affak	(Algeria) Naïma Bouhenni	(Algeria) Zeyneb Kandouci		
Istiqlal	(Iraq) Aryam Al-Zuhairi	(Ghana) Nana Yaa Mingle Andoh	(Ghana) Veronica Appiah	(Ghana) Adongo Safia	
Orthodox	(Ghana) Naomi Anima	(Ghana) Rahama Jafaru			

== League table ==
Pos	Team	Pld	W	D	L	GF	GA	GD	Pts	Promotion or relegation
1	Etihad (C, Q)	15	15	0	0	72	2	+70	45	Qualification for the 2025–26 AFC Women's Champions League
2	Amman FC	15	12	0	3	31	14	+17	36	
3	Orthodox	15	8	0	7	33	28	+5	24	
4	Istiqlal	15	3	3	9	11	29	−18	12	
5	Al-Hussein	15	2	2	11	5	53	−48	8	
6	Al-Nasser	15	1	3	11	7	33	−26	6	Relegation to 2025 Jordan Women's First Division League

Rules for classification: 1) points; 2) goal difference; 3) number of goals scored.
(C) Champions; (Q) Qualified for the phase indicated

== Statistics ==
=== Top goalscorers ===
As of 18 September 2024

Rank	Player	Team	Goals
1	(Algeria) Naïma Bouhenni	Etihad	26
2	(Ghana) Naomi Anima	Orthodox	10
3	(Jordan) Zaina Hazem	Etihad	9
4	(Jordan) Bana Al-Bitar	Amman FC	8
5	(Ghana) Rahama Jafaru	Orthodox	7
5	(Ghana) Veronica Appiah	Istiqlal	7
5	(Jordan) Rouzbahan Fraij	Etihad	7

=== Awards ===
- Goalkeeper of the Season
  - (Jordan) Shireen Al-Shalabi (Etihad)
- Player of the Season
  - (Jordan) Rouzbahan Fraij (Etihad)
