= Women's Jordan Cup =

- Organiser(s): Jordan Football Association
- Founded: 2018; 8 years ago
- Region: Jordan
- Teams: 6
- Current champions: Etihad (2nd title)
- Most championships: Etihad (2 titles)
- Broadcaster: JRTV
- Website: jfa.jo
- 2026–27 Women's Jordan Cup

The Women's Jordan Cup (Arabic: كأس الأردن للسيدات) is Jordan's premier knockout tournament in women's football.

Amman, Shabab Al-Ordon, Al-Ahli and Etihad each have a title to the competition, all tied for the most wins. As of the 2024 competition, 6 teams from the Jordan Women's Pro League get to participate in the Women's Jordan Cup. The tournament is controlled by the Jordan Football Association.

== Wins by year ==
| No. | Season | Champion |
|---|---|---|
| 1 | 2018 | Amman |
| 2 | 2019 | Shabab Al-Ordon |
| | 2020 | Not held |
| | 2021 | Not held |
| 3 | 2022 | Al-Ahli |
| | 2023 | Not held |
| 4 | 2024 | Etihad |
| 5 | 2025 | Etihad |
| 6 | 2026–27 | |

== Performance by club ==
=== Trophies ===
| Club | Winners | Winning years |
|---|---|---|
| Etihad | 2 | 2024, 2025 |
| Amman | 1 | 2018 |
| Shabab Al-Ordon | 1 | 2019 |
| Al-Ahli | 1 | 2022 |

=== Finals ===
Women's Jordan Cup
| Season | Winner | Result | Runner-up |
|---|---|---|---|
| 2018 | Amman | 3–0 | Istiqlal |
| 2019 | Shabab Al-Ordon | 1–0 | Amman |
| 2020 | | N/A | |
| 2021 | | N/A | |
| 2022 | Al-Ahli | 1–0 | Etihad |
| 2023 | | N/A | |
| 2024 | Etihad | 3–1 | Orthodox |
| 2025 | Etihad | 5–0 | Amman FC |
| 2026–27 | | | |

=== Results by team ===
| Club | Wins | Runners-up | Total final appearances |
|---|---|---|---|
| Etihad | 2 | 1 | 3 |
| Amman | 1 | 1 | 2 |
| Shabab Al-Ordon | 1 | 0 | 1 |
| Al-Ahli | 1 | 0 | 1 |
| Istiqlal | 0 | 1 | 1 |
| Orthodox | 0 | 1 | 1 |
| Amman FC | 0 | 1 | 1 |
