= 2026 AFC U-20 Women's Asian Cup squads =

Football competition teams

The following is a list of squads for each national team competing at the 2026 AFC U-20 Women's Asian Cup. The tournament is taking place in Thailand from 1–18 April 2026. It is the 12th biennial international youth football championship organised by the Asian Football Confederation for the women's under-20 national teams of Asia.

Players born between 1 January 2006 and 31 December 2010 were eligible to compete in the tournament. Each team had to register a squad of minimum 18 players and maximum 23 players, minimum three of whom must be goalkeepers (regulation articles 21.2 and 26.3).

The age listed for each player is on 1 April 2026, the first day of the tournament. The numbers of caps and goals listed for each player do not include any matches played after the start of the tournament. The club listed is the club for which the player last played a competitive match prior to the tournament. A flag is included for coaches who are of a different nationality than their own national team.

== Group A ==
=== Bangladesh ===
Head coach: (England) Peter Butler

The following 23 players were named in the squad for the 2026 AFC U-20 Women's Asian Cup.

No.	Pos.	Player	Date of birth (age)	Club
1	GK	Mst Fardosi Akter Shonale	25 November 2007 (aged 18)	(Bangladesh Football Federation) BKSP
22	GK	Swarna Rani Mandal	6 June 2006 (aged 19)	(Bangladesh Football Federation) Rajshahi Stars
23	GK	Mile Akter	14 September 2006 (aged 19)	(Bangladesh Football Federation) Bangladesh Army
2	DF	Nabiran Khatun	18 December 2006 (aged 19)	(Bangladesh Football Federation) BKSP
3	DF	Mst Joynob Bibi Rita	18 June 2008 (aged 17)	(Bangladesh Football Federation) Bangladesh Army
4	DF	Afeida Khandaker	18 November 2006 (aged 19)	(Bangladesh Football Federation) Rajshahi Stars
5	DF	Mst Surma Jannat	1 January 2006 (aged 20)	(Bangladesh Football Federation) Bangladesh Police
6	DF	Arpita Biswas	7 May 2009 (aged 16)	(Bangladesh Football Federation) Bangladesh Army
8	DF	Mst Momita Khatun	1 December 2009 (aged 16)	(Bangladesh Football Federation) Bangladesh Army
18	DF	Puja Das	31 December 2008 (aged 17)	(Bangladesh Football Federation) Rajshahi Stars
21	DF	Mst Surovi Akter Arfin	5 June 2008 (aged 17)	(Bangladesh Football Federation) Bangladesh Army
7	MF	Sapna Rani	9 May 2006 (aged 19)	(Bangladesh Football Federation) Rajshahi Stars
12	MF	Shanti Mardi	23 October 2008 (aged 17)	(Bangladesh Football Federation) Bangladesh Army
13	MF	Mamoni Chakma	20 April 2009 (aged 16)	(Bangladesh Football Federation) Ansar & VDP
15	MF	Most Munki Akhter	5 December 2008 (aged 17)	(Bangladesh Football Federation) Rajshahi Stars
16	MF	Nadia Akter Juti	15 May 2007 (aged 18)	(Bangladesh Football Federation) Rajshahi Stars
19	MF	Sinha Jahan Shikha	7 May 2007 (aged 18)	(Bangladesh Football Federation) Bangladesh Army
9	FW	Sree Moti Trishna	21 January 2008 (aged 18)	(Bangladesh Football Federation) Rajshahi Stars FC
10	FW	Mst Sagorika	1 December 2007 (aged 18)	(Bangladesh Football Federation) Bangladesh Police
11	MF	Umehla Marma	14 August 2007 (aged 18)	(Bangladesh Football Federation) Ansar & VDP
14	FW	Alpi Akter	31 December 2010 (aged 15)	(Bangladesh Football Federation) Rajshahi Stars
17	FW	Sorovi Rani	27 December 2010 (aged 15)	(Bangladesh Football Federation) Ansar & VDP
20	FW	Sauravi Akanda Prity	31 December 2009 (aged 16)	(Bangladesh Football Federation) Rajshahi Stars

=== China ===
Head coach: (England) Colin Bell

No.	Pos.	Player	Date of birth (age)	Club
1	GK	Liu Chen	30 June 2006 (aged 19)	(Chinese Football Association) Beijing Jingtan
12	GK	Guo Xinyu	14 March 2006 (aged 20)	(Chinese Football Association) Jiangsu Wuxi
22	GK	Hou Shumei	30 December 2007 (aged 18)	(Chinese Football Association) Liaoning Shenbei Hefeng
2	DF	Liu Xiabing	4 December 2006 (aged 19)	(Chinese Football Association) Henan Wanxianshan
3	DF	Li Ke	27 August 2006 (aged 19)	(Chinese Football Association) Shanghai Shengli
4	DF	Huang Jiaxin	25 January 2006 (aged 20)	(Chinese Football Association) Shanghai Shengli
5	DF	Liu Ling	11 July 2006 (aged 19)	(Chinese Football Association) Jiangsu Wuxi
8	DF	Yang Yifan	17 January 2007 (aged 19)	(Chinese Football Association) Shanghai Shengli
16	DF	Li Yuhan	8 June 2007 (aged 18)	(Chinese Football Association) Shaanxi Zhidan
17	DF	Xie Zongmei	26 April 2006 (aged 19)	(Chinese Football Association) Liaoning Shenbei Hefeng
18	DF	Wu Jiaxuan	17 December 2006 (aged 19)	(Chinese Football Association) Liaoning Shenbei Hefeng
19	DF	Zeng Yujia	7 July 2006 (aged 19)	(Chinese Football Association) Beijing Jingtan
7	MF	Zhou Xinyi	26 February 2008 (aged 18)	(Chinese Football Association) Shanghai Shengli
10	MF	Wang Aifang	15 January 2006 (aged 20)	(Chinese Football Association) Liaoning Shenbei Hefeng
11	MF	Yu Xingyue	24 December 2006 (aged 19)	(Chinese Football Association) Guangxi Pingguo Beinong
13	MF	Xiao Yafei	28 May 2007 (aged 18)	(Chinese Football Association) Shandong Jinghua
15	MF	Zhang Yiqian	2 February 2006 (aged 20)	(Chinese Football Association) Qingdao West Coast
23	MF	Cheng Wandi	6 November 2009 (aged 16)	(Chinese Football Association) Shanghai Shengli
6	FW	Zheng Lu	21 May 2006 (aged 19)	(Chinese Football Association) Beijing Jingtan
9	FW	Lu Jiayu	18 January 2006 (aged 20)	(Chinese Football Association) Beijing Jingtan
14	FW	Zhang Jie	13 December 2008 (aged 17)	(Chinese Football Association) Zhejiang Hangzhou
20	FW	Yu Jiaqi	4 April 2006 (aged 19)	(Chinese Football Association) Jiangsu Wuxi
21	FW	Luo Luo	12 October 2006 (aged 19)	(Chinese Football Association) Wuhan Jianghan

=== Thailand ===
Head coach: Nuengrutai Srathongvian

No.	Pos.	Player	Date of birth (age)	Club
1	GK	Atima Boonprakanpai	13 March 2007 (aged 19)	(Football Association of Thailand) Surin
18	GK	Chonticha Panyarung	30 December 2008 (aged 17)	(Football Association of Thailand) Khon Kaen
22	GK	Nongnuch Ritthakon	29 April 2006 (aged 19)	(Football Association of Thailand) Kasem Bundit
2	DF	Porntita Sitthisan	3 February 2007 (aged 19)	(Football Association of Thailand) Chonburi
3	DF	Vivien Dieter	19 January 2009 (aged 17)	(German Football Association) TSG 1899 Hoffenheim
4	DF	Alissada Yuttakas	20 March 2008 (aged 18)	(Football Association of Thailand) BGC–College of Asian Scholars
5	DF	Manita Noyvach	15 November 2007 (aged 18)	(Football Association of Thailand) Chonburi
6	DF	Pinyaphat Klinklai	26 January 2008 (aged 18)	(Football Association of Thailand) Bangkok
12	DF	Thanchanok Cheunarom	30 June 2006 (aged 19)	(Football Association of Thailand) Chonburi
13	DF	Natcha Kaewanta	3 December 2006 (aged 19)	(Football Association of Thailand) Chonburi
21	DF	Parichat Thongrong	14 May 2006 (aged 19)	(Football Association of Thailand) Kasem Bundit
7	MF	Rinyaphat Moondong	19 June 2007 (aged 18)	(Football Association of Thailand) Chonburi
8	MF	Pichayatida Manowang	17 November 2006 (aged 19)	(Football Association of Thailand) Bangkok
9	MF	Achiraya Yingsakul	13 December 2007 (aged 18)	(Football Association of Thailand) Phranakorn
15	MF	Prichakorn Kruechuenchom	4 December 2008 (aged 17)	(Football Association of Thailand) Chonburi
17	MF	Kessirin Boonmatun	18 February 2008 (aged 18)	(Football Association of Thailand) Buriram
10	FW	Kurisara Limpawanich	5 February 2009 (aged 17)	(Football Association of Thailand) BGC–College of Asian Scholars
11	FW	Phatcharaphorn Khuchuea	23 October 2007 (aged 18)	(Football Association of Thailand) LPGSS
14	FW	Rasita Taobao	6 June 2007 (aged 18)	(Football Association of Thailand) Chonburi
16	FW	Nachanok Kosonsaksakun	22 September 2008 (aged 17)	(Football Association of Thailand) Phranakorn
19	FW	Madison Casteen	15 October 2007 (aged 18)	(United States Soccer Federation) NC State Wolfpack
20	FW	Cayden Chowana-Bandhu	29 January 2008 (aged 18)	(United States Soccer Federation) Eagles ECNL
23	FW	Chirarak Khamtan	9 July 2008 (aged 17)	(Football Association of Thailand) LPGSS

=== Vietnam ===
Head coach: (Japan) Masahiko Okiyama

Vietnam announced their 30-player training squad on 24 February 2026.

No.	Pos.	Player	Date of birth (age)	Club
1	GK	Lê Thị Thu	1 August 2007 (aged 18)	(Vietnam Football Federation) Phong Phú Hà Nam
12	GK	Lò Thị Huyền Trang	6 September 2006 (aged 19)	(Vietnam Football Federation) Phong Phú Hà Nam
21	GK	Phạm Ngọc Anh	17 June 2007 (aged 18)	(Vietnam Football Federation) Hà Nội
2	DF	Tạ Thị Hồng Minh	13 January 2008 (aged 18)	(Vietnam Football Federation) Phong Phú Hà Nam
3	DF	Nguyễn Thị Thuỳ Linh	29 June 2006 (aged 19)	(Vietnam Football Federation) Hồ Chí Minh City
4	DF	Nguyễn Thị Thương	2 June 2007 (aged 18)	(Vietnam Football Federation) Hà Nội
15	DF	Đào Khánh Vy	24 April 2006 (aged 19)	(Vietnam Football Federation) Hà Nội
17	DF	Dương Trần Bảo Trân	3 April 2006 (aged 19)	(Vietnam Football Federation) Thái Nguyên
18	DF	Lê Thị Như Quỳnh	18 February 2006 (aged 20)	(Vietnam Football Federation) Thái Nguyên
20	DF	Lục Thị Tuyết Lan	16 April 2007 (aged 18)	(Vietnam Football Federation) Thái Nguyên
5	MF	Lê Hồng Yêu	24 July 2007 (aged 18)	(Vietnam Football Federation) Phong Phú Hà Nam
6	MF	Nguyễn Thị Thùy Nhi	20 February 2006 (aged 20)	(Vietnam Football Federation) Hà Nội
7	MF	Nguyễn Thu Trang	18 April 2007 (aged 18)	(Vietnam Football Federation) Thái Nguyên
8	MF	Nguyễn Ngô Thảo Nguyên	5 February 2008 (aged 18)	(Vietnam Football Federation) Thái Nguyên
13	MF	Nguyễn Thị Hồng Huệ	16 September 2007 (aged 18)	(Vietnam Football Federation) Phong Phú Hà Nam
14	MF	Y Za Lương	4 July 2008 (aged 17)	(Vietnam Football Federation) Phong Phú Hà Nam
16	MF	Nguyễn Thị Quý	15 April 2006 (aged 19)	(Vietnam Football Federation) Hà Nội
19	MF	Ngân Thị Thanh Hiếu	13 February 2007 (aged 19)	(Vietnam Football Federation) Phong Phú Hà Nam
22	MF	Đỗ Thị Thùy Nga	22 February 2008 (aged 18)	(Vietnam Football Federation) Thái Nguyên
23	MF	An Hoàng Cúc	29 January 2006 (aged 20)	(Vietnam Football Federation) Hà Nội
9	FW	Lưu Hoàng Vân	9 April 2006 (aged 19)	(Vietnam Football Federation) Phong Phú Hà Nam
10	FW	Lê Thị Trang	21 December 2007 (aged 18)	(Vietnam Football Federation) Hà Nội
11	FW	Đậu Nguyễn Quỳnh Anh	1 January 2007 (aged 19)	(Vietnam Football Federation) Hồ Chí Minh City

== Group B ==
=== Jordan ===
Head coach: Hussam Abu-Raiyyash

Jordan announced their 23-player squad on 23 March 2026.

No.	Pos.	Player	Date of birth (age)	Club
1	GK	Cileen Seif	22 January 2008 (aged 18)	(Jordan Football Association) Amman
12	GK	Sajida Issa	16 March 2008 (aged 18)	(Jordan Football Association) Etihad Club
22	GK	Celine Shannak	26 August 2006 (aged 19)	(Jordan Football Association) Amman
2	DF	Sara Al-Zoubi	29 January 2009 (aged 17)	(United States Soccer Federation) Michigan Hawks
3	DF	Panar Shamali	12 February 2009 (aged 17)	(United States Soccer Federation) Real Jersey Futbol Academy
4	DF	Raneem Daoud	28 June 2006 (aged 19)	(Jordan Football Association) Al-Naser
20	DF	Maya Awadallah	2 January 2007 (aged 19)	(Jordan Football Association) Al-Raya
5	MF	Rayana Issa	16 May 2009 (aged 16)	(United Arab Emirates Football Association) Banaat FC
6	MF	Deanna Al-Khawaja	30 June 2008 (aged 17)	(United States Soccer Federation) Carolina Velocity
8	MF	Marah Abbaas	26 November 2006 (aged 19)	(Jordan Football Association) Amman
10	MF	Hala Marar	8 May 2007 (aged 18)	(Jordan Football Association) Etihad Club
14	MF	Lamar Ibrahim	3 February 2006 (aged 20)	(Jordan Football Association) Etihad Club
17	MF	Raghad Al-Tarawneh	17 July 2006 (aged 19)	(Jordan Football Association) Al-Naser
21	MF	Nadin Abu Salha	7 March 2010 (aged 16)	(Jordan Football Association) Amman
23	MF	Siwar Obeid	15 June 2006 (aged 19)	(Jordan Football Association) Orthodox Club
7	FW	Arwa Batayneh	20 May 2007 (aged 18)	(Jordan Football Association) Amman
9	FW	Dana Abu Hazeem	20 August 2009 (aged 16)	(Jordan Football Association) Amman
11	FW	Rama Al-Khashook	2 July 2007 (aged 18)	(Jordan Football Association) Amman
13	FW	Mira Jarrar	12 January 2009 (aged 17)	(Jordan Football Association) Etihad Club
15	FW	Alma Al-Saify	8 November 2010 (aged 15)	(Jordan Football Association) Etihad Club
16	FW	Kinda Al-Titi	11 August 2006 (aged 19)	(Jordan Football Association) Etihad Club
18	FW	Yasmeen Al Zurikat	20 May 2007 (aged 18)	(German Football Association) VfR Warbeyen
19	FW	Haya Abu Ali	3 March 2009 (aged 17)	(Jordan Football Association) Etihad Club

=== North Korea ===
Head coach: Han Chol-hak

No.	Pos.	Player	Date of birth (age)	Club
1	GK	Pak Ju-gyong	7 November 2007 (aged 18)	(DPR Korea Football Association) Naegohyang
2	FW	Kim Ju-hyang	11 November 2006 (aged 19)	(DPR Korea Football Association) Pyongyang
3	DF	Jong Pok-yong	20 January 2007 (aged 19)	(DPR Korea Football Association) February 8
5	DF	Ri Ye-gyong	10 November 2007 (aged 18)	(DPR Korea Football Association) February 8
6	MF	Pak Ok-i	12 April 2007 (aged 18)	(DPR Korea Football Association) February 8
7	MF	Jon Il-chong	12 March 2007 (aged 19)	(DPR Korea Football Association) Amnokgang
8	MF	So Ryu-gyong	10 November 2007 (aged 18)	(DPR Korea Football Association) Amnokgang
9	FW	Ri Su-jong	7 January 2007 (aged 19)	(DPR Korea Football Association) Naegohyang
10	FW	Choe Yon-a	1 January 2007 (aged 19)	(DPR Korea Football Association) Naegohyang
11	FW	Choe Rim-jong	27 January 2007 (aged 19)	(DPR Korea Football Association) Amnokgang
12	FW	Kang Ryu-mi	20 September 2007 (aged 18)	(DPR Korea Football Association) Rimyongsu
13	FW	Ho Kyong	28 February 2007 (aged 19)	(DPR Korea Football Association) February 8
14	DF	Pak Il-sim	20 May 2007 (aged 18)	(DPR Korea Football Association) Amnokgang
15	DF	Choe Chong-gum	15 September 2007 (aged 18)	(DPR Korea Football Association) February 8
16	DF	Yom Chol-nim	13 January 2007 (aged 19)	(DPR Korea Football Association) Wolmido
17	DF	Ri Kuk-hyang	7 October 2007 (aged 18)	(DPR Korea Football Association) Naegohyang
18	GK	Choe Kyong-mi	17 July 2007 (aged 18)	(DPR Korea Football Association) Amnokgang
19	MF	Ro Un-hyang	18 May 2007 (aged 18)	(DPR Korea Football Association) Naegohyang
20	MF	An Kyong-yong	27 August 2007 (aged 18)	(DPR Korea Football Association) February 8
21	GK	Ri Ok	5 January 2006 (aged 20)	(DPR Korea Football Association) February 8
23	MF	Ri Pom	3 March 2007 (aged 19)	(DPR Korea Football Association) Naegohyang

=== South Korea ===
Head coach: Park Yoon-jeong

South Korea announced their 23-player squad on 13 March 2026.

No.	Pos.	Player	Date of birth (age)	Caps	Goals	Club
1	GK	Kim Chae-bin	14 April 2008 (aged 17)			(Korea Football Association) Gwangyang Girls High School
2	DF	Maeng Hui-jin	13 September 2006 (aged 19)			(Korea Football Association) Gangwon State University
3	DF	Yoon Ah-young	14 September 2007 (aged 18)			(Korea Football Association) Dankook University
4	MF	Jung Da-bin	4 January 2006 (aged 20)			(Korea Football Association) Uiduk University
5	DF	Nam Seung-eun	10 January 2006 (aged 20)			(Japan Football Association) Albirex Niigata
6	MF	Han Min-seo	22 June 2006 (aged 19)			(Korea Football Association) Korea University
7	MF	Choi Ju-hong	23 July 2007 (aged 18)			(Korea Football Association) Daekyeung University
8	MF	Jin Hye-rin	29 June 2006 (aged 19)			(Korea Football Association) Korea University
9	FW	Lee Ha-eun I (Note: There are two players named Lee Ha-eun (Korean: 이하은), both forwards born in 2006)	21 January 2006 (aged 20)			(Korea Football Association) Ulsan College
10	FW	Lee Ha-eun II	21 July 2006 (aged 19)			(Korea Football Association) Uiduk University
11	FW	Cho Hye-yeong	18 February 2006 (aged 20)			(Korea Football Association) Korea University
12	DF	Jeon Si-woo	9 August 2006 (aged 19)			(Korea Football Association) Ulsan College
13	MF	Kim Min-seo	24 August 2009 (aged 16)			(Korea Football Association) Hyundai High School
14	MF	Park Ji-yoo	6 September 2007 (aged 18)			(Korea Football Association) Ulsan College
15	FW	Park Ga-yeon	5 September 2007 (aged 18)			(Korea Football Association) Daekyeung University
16	FW	Lee Ha-neul	10 March 2006 (aged 20)			(Korea Football Association) Daekyeung University
17	FW	Seo Min-jeong	31 January 2006 (aged 20)			(Korea Football Association) Ulsan College
18	GK	Wi Hye-bin	25 November 2006 (aged 19)			(Korea Football Association) Korea University
19	FW	Park Ju-ha	10 October 2007 (aged 18)			(Korea Football Association) Daekyeung University
20	DF	Kang Hye-sook	27 April 2006 (aged 19)			(Korea Football Association) Gangwon State University
21	GK	Kim Gyu-rin	24 July 2007 (aged 18)			(Korea Football Association) Ulsan College
22	FW	Han Che-rin	8 December 2007 (aged 18)			(Korea Football Association) Uiduk University
23	DF	Katia Clement (Note: Also known by her Korean name Oh Dan-bi (Korean: 오단비))	1 April 2008 (aged 18)			(Football Australia) UNSW FC

=== Uzbekistan ===
Head coach: Vladimir Panov

No.	Pos.	Player	Date of birth (age)	Club
1	GK	Ezoza Sevinova	23 April 2007 (aged 18)	(Uzbekistan Football Association) Qizilqum
12	GK	Jumagul Yokubjonova	7 December 2007 (aged 18)	(Uzbekistan Football Association) Sagdiyana
13	GK	Charos Khayrullaeva	30 December 2007 (aged 18)	(Uzbekistan Football Association) Bunyodkor
2	DF	Mariya Dakhova	17 February 2010 (aged 16)	(Uzbekistan Football Association) PFC Lokomotiv
3	DF	Nargiza Eshtemirova	15 April 2006 (aged 19)	(Uzbekistan Football Association) Bunyodkor
4	DF	Madina Shovkatova	7 April 2007 (aged 18)	(Uzbekistan Football Association) Qizilqum
5	DF	Karina Gamadeeva	5 May 2007 (aged 18)	(Uzbekistan Football Association) Bunyodkor
14	DF	Nazira Sayfiddinova	17 March 2007 (aged 19)	(Uzbekistan Football Association) Bunyodkor
15	DF	Meruert Rakhmatullaeva	2 March 2008 (aged 18)	(Uzbekistan Football Association) Bunyodkor
22	DF	Rukhshona Usarova	26 July 2007 (aged 18)	(Uzbekistan Football Association) Sagdiyana
6	MF	Umidakhon Yigitalieva	12 June 2006 (aged 19)	(Uzbekistan Football Association) Bunyodkor
8	MF	Etibor Shodieva	2 February 2008 (aged 18)	(Uzbekistan Football Association) Qizilqum
9	MF	Diyora Bakhtiyarova	29 August 2007 (aged 18)	(Uzbekistan Football Association) Bunyodkor
10	MF	Asalkhon Aminjonova	22 April 2007 (aged 18)	(Uzbekistan Football Association) FC AGMK
11	MF	Mehribon Egamberdieva	9 October 2007 (aged 18)	(Uzbekistan Football Association) Nasaf Qarshi
16	MF	Dilnoza Tolibova	26 November 2007 (aged 18)	(Uzbekistan Football Association) Sagdiyana
17	MF	Rukhshona Olimjonova	1 January 2007 (aged 19)	(Uzbekistan Football Association) FC AGMK
19	MF	Dilnura Mamatkulova	16 October 2007 (aged 18)	(Uzbekistan Football Association) Sagdiyana
21	MF	Nilufar Nurmuhammadova	12 April 2007 (aged 18)	(Uzbekistan Football Association) PFC Lokomotiv
7	FW	Oydinoy Turgunova	15 March 2006 (aged 20)	(Uzbekistan Football Association) FC AGMK
18	FW	Shahnoza Dekanbaeva	18 January 2008 (aged 18)	(Uzbekistan Football Association) PFC Lokomotiv
20	FW	Zarina Norboeva	16 January 2006 (aged 20)	(Uzbekistan Football Association) Nasaf Qarshi
23	FW	Dinora Bazarbaeva	30 October 2006 (aged 19)	(Uzbekistan Football Association) Neftchi

== Group C ==
=== Australia ===
Head coach: Alex Epakis

Australia announced their 23-player squad on 24 March 2026. On 1 April 2026, Clara Hoarau withdrew from the squad due to injury and was replaced by Caley Tallon-Henniker.

No.	Pos.	Player	Date of birth (age)	Caps	Goals	Club
1	GK	Ilona Melegh	2 July 2008 (aged 17)			(Football Australia) Adelaide United
2	DF	Amelia Bennett	22 May 2008 (aged 17)			(Football Australia) Western Sydney Wanderers
3	DF	Tegan Bertolissio	1 August 2006 (aged 19)			(Football Australia) Canberra United
4	FW	Alexis Collins	10 March 2008 (aged 18)			(Football Australia) Newcastle Jets
5	MF	Daisy Brown	13 July 2006 (aged 19)			(Football Australia) Brisbane Roar
6	MF	Emma Dundas	29 May 2007 (aged 18)			(Football Australia) Newcastle Jets
7	DF	India Breier	30 April 2006 (aged 19)			(Football Australia) Newcastle Jets
8	FW	Milly Cassar	9 February 2008 (aged 18)			(Football Australia) Sydney FC
9	FW	Skye Halmarick	13 February 2008 (aged 18)			(Football Australia) Sydney FC
10	FW	Tiana Fuller	28 July 2008 (aged 17)			(Football Australia) Central Coast Mariners
11	MF	Poppy O'Keefe	17 August 2008 (aged 17)			(Football Australia) Melbourne Victory
12	GK	Jasmine Black	3 May 2006 (aged 19)			(United States Soccer Federation) George Washington Revolutionaries
13	MF	Shelby McMahon	13 May 2008 (aged 17)			(Football Australia) Melbourne City
14	MF	Zara Kruger	29 May 2006 (aged 19)			(Football Australia) Brisbane Roar
15	DF	Alexia Apostolakis	16 May 2006 (aged 19)			(Football Australia) Melbourne City
16	MF	Avaani Prakash	13 December 2006 (aged 19)			(Football Australia) Central Coast Mariners
17	FW	Caley Tallon-Henniker	17 February 2006 (aged 20)			(Football Australia) Sydney FC
18	GK	Georgia Ritchie	11 March 2008 (aged 18)			(Football Australia) Newcastle Jets
19	FW	Talia Younis	26 October 2008 (aged 17)			(Football Australia) Western Sydney Wanderers
20	FW	Danella Butrus	13 February 2007 (aged 19)			(Football Australia) Melbourne City
21	FW	Peta Trimis	18 May 2006 (aged 19)			(Football Australia) Central Coast Mariners
22	DF	Rubi Sullivan	7 January 2009 (aged 17)			(Football Australia) Sydney FC
23	FW	Sienna Dale	17 April 2007 (aged 18)			(Football Australia) Canberra United

=== Chinese Taipei ===
Head coach: Hsieh Chih-chun

No.	Pos.	Player	Date of birth (age)	Club
1	GK	Jian Yu-jie	22 September 2006 (aged 19)	Unattached
18	GK	Wang Ruo-Ping	7 March 2006 (aged 20)	(Chinese Taipei Football Association) CITIC School Foundation
23	GK	Peng Pei-qing	15 July 2008 (aged 17)	(Chinese Taipei Football Association) NTPC Private Hsing Wu SHS
3	DF	Li Chun-mei	3 August 2006 (aged 19)	(Chinese Taipei Football Association) NTPC Private Hsing Wu SHS
5	DF	Ma Ho-ya	2 May 2007 (aged 18)	(Chinese Taipei Football Association) National Taiwan Normal University
6	DF	Chen Ying-xuan	27 July 2009 (aged 16)	(Chinese Taipei Football Association) NTPC Private Hsing Wu SHS
13	DF	Fu Chih-ling	6 April 2007 (aged 18)	(Chinese Taipei Football Association) National Taiwan Normal University
16	DF	Shao Tzu-i	12 October 2007 (aged 18)	(Chinese Taipei Football Association) NTPC Private Hsing Wu SHS
17	DF	Lin Yu-hui	26 April 2006 (aged 19)	(Chinese Taipei Football Association) Taichung Municipal Hui-Wen HS
7	MF	Lin Pin-yun	24 October 2007 (aged 18)	(Chinese Taipei Football Association) NTPC Private Hsing Wu SHS
8	MF	Lin Szu-ying	10 June 2007 (aged 18)	(Chinese Taipei Football Association) National Taiwan Normal University
11	MF	Liao Jie-ning	24 September 2008 (aged 17)	(Japan Football Association) Yamagatameisei HS
15	MF	Li Yong-shan	22 April 2008 (aged 17)	(Chinese Taipei Football Association) Taichung Municipal Hui-Wen HS
19	MF	Hsu Tzu-han	13 June 2008 (aged 17)	(Chinese Taipei Football Association) Taichung Municipal Hui-Wen HS
20	MF	Lin Pin-hsin	24 October 2007 (aged 18)	(Chinese Taipei Football Association) NTPC Private Hsing Wu SHS
22	MF	Chen Yi-fei	20 October 2008 (aged 17)	(Chinese Taipei Football Association) NTPC Private Hsing Wu SHS
2	FW	Chian Wei-tong	7 January 2006 (aged 20)	(Chinese Taipei Football Association) CITIC School Foundation
4	FW	Lo Yu-hsiu	20 November 2006 (aged 19)	(Chinese Taipei Football Association) National Taitung University
9	FW	Chuan Tzu-yu	4 November 2008 (aged 17)	(Chinese Taipei Football Association) NTPC Private Hsing Wu SHS
10	FW	Kao Hsin	6 April 2007 (aged 18)	(Chinese Taipei Football Association) National Taiwan Normal University
12	FW	Li Pei-yao	5 February 2007 (aged 19)	(Chinese Taipei Football Association) National Taiwan Normal University
14	FW	Huang Hui-shan	24 October 2007 (aged 18)	(Chinese Taipei Football Association) Taichung Municipal Hui-Wen HS
21	FW	Huang I-ping	7 February 2008 (aged 18)	(Chinese Taipei Football Association) NTPC Private Hsing Wu SHS

=== India ===
Head coach: (Sweden) Joakim Alexandersson

India announced their 24-player travelling squad on 20 March 2026. The final 23-player squad will be announced closer to the tournament.

No.	Pos.	Player	Date of birth (age)	Club
1	GK	Monalisha Devi Moirangthem	3 July 2006 (aged 19)	(All India Football Federation) Sribhumi
13	GK	Ribansi Jamu	16 December 2008 (aged 17)	(All India Football Federation) Garhwal United
23	GK	Nandini Mattu	6 June 2007 (aged 18)	(All India Football Federation) Sethu
2	DF	Sahena	14 March 2006 (aged 20)	(All India Football Federation) Gokulam Kerala
3	DF	Shruti Kumari	25 February 2006 (aged 20)	(All India Football Federation) Garhwal United
4	DF	Thoibisana Chanu Toijam	7 March 2007 (aged 19)	(All India Football Federation) Sribhumi
5	DF	Nishima Kumari	13 July 2007 (aged 18)	(All India Football Federation) Nita Football Academy
14	DF	Remi Thokchom	14 March 2008 (aged 18)	(All India Football Federation) Gokulam Kerala
15	DF	Ruchi	1 January 2006 (aged 20)	(All India Football Federation) Sethu
16	DF	Shubhangi Singh	11 June 2006 (aged 19)	(All India Football Federation) Gokulam Kerala
22	DF	Cindy Remruatpuii Colney	26 March 2007 (aged 19)	(All India Football Federation) Nita Football Academy
6	MF	Arina Devi Nameirakpam	4 March 2008 (aged 18)	(All India Football Federation) Sribhumi
7	MF	Neha Sillay	19 May 2006 (aged 19)	(All India Football Federation) Nita Football Academy
8	MF	Pooja	7 February 2007 (aged 19)	(All India Football Federation) HOPS FC
9	MF	Babita Kumari	2 August 2008 (aged 17)	(All India Football Federation) Nita Football Academy
12	MF	Bhumika Devi Khumukcham	15 February 2007 (aged 19)	(All India Football Federation) Nita Football Academy
18	MF	Monisha Singha	13 January 2007 (aged 19)	(All India Football Federation) Garhwal United
19	MF	Anju Chanu Kayenpaibam	2 March 2007 (aged 19)	(All India Football Federation) Sribhumi
21	MF	Sulanjana Raul	4 June 2007 (aged 18)	(All India Football Federation) East Bengal
10	FW	Sibani Devi Nongmeikapam	13 January 2007 (aged 19)	(All India Football Federation) Sribhumi
11	FW	Lhingdeikim Kipgen	23 January 2008 (aged 18)	(All India Football Federation) Garhwal United
17	FW	Shilji Shaji	13 March 2007 (aged 19)	(All India Football Federation) Gokulam Kerala
20	FW	Deepika Pal	22 January 2008 (aged 18)	(All India Football Federation) Garhwal United

=== Japan ===
Head coach: Akira Ijiri

Japan announced their 23-player squad on 17 March 2026. On 21 March, Sako Nawa withdrew due to injury and was replaced by Korin Sakata.

No.	Pos.	Player	Date of birth (age)	Caps	Goals	Club
1	GK	Uruha Iwasaki	13 March 2006 (aged 20)			(Japan Football Association) Nojima Stella Kanagawa
2	DF	Yuna Aoki	7 July 2008 (aged 17)			(Japan Football Association) Tokyo Verdy
3	DF	Mitsuki Ota	20 January 2007 (aged 19)			(Japan Football Association) INAC Kobe
4	DF	Tamami Aso	26 October 2007 (aged 18)			(Japan Football Association) Tokyo Verdy
5	DF	Haruko Suzuki	1 November 2007 (aged 18)			(Japan Football Association) Nittaidai Yokohama
6	MF	Rinka Higuchi	9 May 2006 (aged 19)			(Japan Football Association) AS Elfen Saitama
7	FW	Miyu Matsunaga	6 August 2006 (aged 19)			(Japan Football Association) Tokyo Verdy
8	FW	Asako Furuta	23 April 2007 (aged 18)			(Japan Football Association) Tezukayama Gakuin University
9	FW	Anon Tsuda	8 November 2007 (aged 18)			(Japan Football Association) Mynavi Sendai
10	FW	Mao Itamura	6 August 2006 (aged 19)			(Royal Dutch Football Association) Feyenoord
11	FW	Natsumi Tago	5 August 2006 (aged 19)			(Japan Football Association) Cerezo Osaka
12	GK	Hinaha Ishida	28 November 2006 (aged 19)			(Japan Football Association) Sanfrecce Hiroshima
13	FW	Miki Kimura	30 May 2006 (aged 19)			(Japan Football Association) AS Elfen Saitama
14	MF	Miharu Shinjo	5 February 2007 (aged 19)			(Japan Football Association) Tokyo Verdy
15	FW	Momoka Honda	12 June 2007 (aged 18)			(Japan Football Association) Tokyo Verdy
16	MF	Moka Arai	21 October 2006 (aged 19)			(Japan Football Association) Cerezo Osaka
17	MF	Yura Honda	1 February 2006 (aged 20)			(Japan Football Association) Nittaidai Yokohama
18	DF	Hibari Hara	17 May 2007 (aged 18)			(Japan Football Association) AS Elfen Saitama
19	DF	Natsume Kingetsu	21 July 2007 (aged 18)			(Japan Football Association) INAC Kobe
20	DF	Mone Sato	15 November 2008 (aged 17)			(Japan Football Association) Omiya Ardija
21	MF	Noa Fukushima	12 December 2008 (aged 17)			(Japan Football Association) JFA Academy Fukushima
22	MF	Momoka Sano	17 April 2008 (aged 17)			(Japan Football Association) JFA Academy Fukushima
23	GK	Korin Sakata	19 April 2007 (aged 18)			(Japan Football Association) Albirex Niigata
