= 2023 Jordan Women's Pro League =

Jordan Women's Pro League
- Season: 2023
- Dates: 24 May 2023 – 23 August 2023
- Champions: Etihad (1st title)
- AFC Champions League: Etihad
- Matches: 30
- Goals: 109 (3.63 per match)
- Top goalscorer: Lili Iskandar (Etihad) (14 goals)
- All statistics correct as of 23 August 2023.

The 2023 Jordan Women's Pro League was the 16th season of the Jordan Women's Pro League, the top-level women's football league in Jordan.

The league started on 24 May 2023 and concluded on 23 August 2023.

== Teams ==
5 teams will contest the 2023 Women's Pro League Season. 4 from the previous season, as well as Amman FC, who replaced last season's league winners Al-Ahli.

Locations of the 2024 Jordan Women's Pro League teams

Team	Location	Ground	Capacity	2022 Season
Al-Nasser	Amman	Polo Stadium	2,000	4th
Amman FC	Amman	Polo Stadium	2,000	N/A
Istiqlal	Amman	Polo Stadium	2,000	5th
Etihad	Amman	Polo Stadium	2,000	2nd
Orthodox	Amman	Polo Stadium	2,000	3rd

== League table ==
Pos	Team	Pld	W	D	L	GF	GA	GD	Pts	Promotion or relegation
1	Etihad (C, Q)	12	8	3	1	33	5	+28	27	Qualification for the 2024–25 AFC Women's Champions League
2	Orthodox (Q)	12	6	5	1	23	12	+11	23	
3	Amman FC	12	5	3	4	27	21	+6	18	
4	Al-Nasser	12	4	2	6	18	24	−6	14	
5	Istiqlal	12	0	1	11	8	47	−39	1	

Rules for classification: 1) points; 2) goal difference; 3) number of goals scored.
(C) Champions; (Q) Qualified for the phase indicated

== Statistics ==
=== Top goalscorers ===
Rank	Player	Team	Goals
1	(Lebanon) Lili Iskandar	Etihad	14
2	(Ghana) Rahama Jafaru	Orthodox	9
3	(Ghana) Fredrica Torkudor	Al-Nasser	8
4	(Jordan) Bana Al-Bitar	Amman FC	7
4	(Jordan) Tala Al-Barghouthy	Istiqlal	7
4	(Jordan) Rouzbahan Fraij	Etihad	7
