= 2025–26 Jordan Women's Pro League =

Jordan Women's Pro League
- Season: 2025–26
- Dates: 18 September 2025 – 27 January 2026
- Champions: Etihad
- AFC Champions League: Etihad
- Top goalscorer: Mai Sweilem (Etihad) (15 goals)
- All statistics correct as of 7 December 2025.

The 2025–26 Jordan Women's Pro League was the 18th season of the Jordan Women's Pro League, the top-level of women's football in Jordan.

== Summary ==
The league started on 18 September 2025 and concluded on 27 January 2026.

On 17 January 2026, Etihad were crowned as champions of the competition.

== Teams ==
6 teams contested the 2025–26 Jordan Women's Pro League season. 5 from the previous season participated, as well as the 2024 Jordan Women's First Division League champions Nashama Al-Mustaqbal, who replace the relegated Al-Nasser.

Locations of the 2025–26 Jordan Women's Pro League teams

Team	Location	Ground	Capacity	2024 Season
Al-Hussein	Irbid	Polo Stadium	2,000	5th
Amman FC	Amman	Polo Stadium	2,000	2nd
Etihad	Amman	Polo Stadium	2,000	1st
Istiqlal	Amman	Polo Stadium	2,000	4th
Nashama Al-Mustaqbal	Amman	Polo Stadium	2,000	1st (promoted)
Orthodox	Amman	Polo Stadium	2,000	3rd

== Foreign players ==
Club	Player 1	Player 2	Player 3	Player 4	Player 5	Player 6	Former players
Al-Hussein							
Amman FC	(Kenya) Elizabeth Kioko Katungwa	(Ghana) Ernestina Ayissie	(Ghana) Gifty Osei	(Ghana) Beauty Julius			
Etihad	(Mozambique) Ninika	(Nepal) Preeti Rai	(Ghana) Eugenia Tetteh	(Ghana) Takia Zakaria	(Ghana) Lydia Krampah	(Ghana) Naomi Anima	
Istiqlal	(Ghana) Vinoria Kuzagbe	(Ghana) Hannah Nyame	(Ghana) Debora Agyei Kuruwaa	(Ghana) Theresah Annor			
Nashama Al-Mustaqbal	(Costa Rica) Diana Vallejos	(Panama) Nicole De Obaldía	(Panama) Aaliyah Gil	(Palestine) Mirave Marouf	(Palestine) Malak Barakat		
Orthodox	(Ghana) Veronica Appiah	(Ghana) Monica Addai	(Ghana) Safia Adongo	(Lebanon) Dima Al Kasti			

== League table ==
Pos	Team	Pld	W	D	L	GF	GA	GD	Pts	Promotion or relegation
1	Etihad (C, Q)	12	9	2	1	39	9	+30	29	Qualification for the 2026–27 AFC Women's Champions League
2	Amman FC	12	7	3	2	27	20	+7	24	
3	Nashama Al-Mustaqbal	12	3	2	7	19	31	−12	11	
4	Istiqlal	12	2	4	6	15	29	−14	10	
5	Orthodox	12	1	5	6	10	21	−11	8	
6	Al-Hussein	0	0	0	0	0	0	0	0	Withdrew

Rules for classification: 1) points; 2) goal difference; 3) number of goals scored.
(C) Champions; (Q) Qualified for the phase indicated
