= 2025 Jordan Women's First Division League =

Jordan Women's First Division League
- Season: 2025
- Dates: 8 August 2025 – 3 October 2025
- Champions: Al-Nasser
- Promoted: Al-Nasser
- Biggest home win: Shafa Badran 17-0 Doqara (Week 4)
- Biggest away win: Doqara 0-28 Al-Ahli (Week 3)
- All statistics correct as of 3 October 2025.

The 2025 Jordan Women's First Division League is the 9th season of the Jordan Women's First Division League, the second level women's football league in Jordan.

The league started on 8 August 2025 and will conclude on 3 October 2025, to which the winner would gain promotion to the following 2026–27 Jordan Women's Pro League.

On 22 September 2025, Al-Nasser were declared as winners of the competition.

== Format ==
The competition follows a one-stage league format, where the team with the highest points at the end would get crowned as champions and would gain direct promotion to the Jordan Women's Pro League for the following season.

== Teams ==
9 teams contested the Women's First Division League Season. 8 from the previous season, as well as Al-Nasser.

Locations of the 2025 Jordan Women's First Division League teams

Team	Location	Ground	Capacity	2024 Season
Ajloun	Ajloun	Polo Stadium	2,000	8th
Al-Ahli	Amman	Polo Stadium	2,000	3rd
Al-Nasser	Amman	Polo Stadium	2,000	6th (relegated)
Al-Orobah	Al-Karak	Polo Stadium	2,000	2nd
Al-Raya	Zarqa	Polo Stadium	2,000	9th
Doqara	Duwaqarah, Irbid	Polo Stadium	2,000	7th
Petra	Russeifa	Polo Stadium	2,000	5th
Shabab Bushra	Bushra	Polo Stadium	2,000	6th
Shafa Badran	Shafa Badran, Amman	Polo Stadium	2,000	4th

== League table ==
Pos	Team	Pld	W	D	L	GF	GA	GD	Pts	Promotion or relegation
1	Al-Nasser (C, P)	8	8	0	0	106	2	+104	24	2026–27 Jordan Women's Pro League
2	Al-Ahli	8	7	0	1	79	4	+75	21	
3	Shafa Badran	8	5	1	2	48	8	+40	16	
4	Al-Orobah	8	5	1	2	49	18	+31	16	
5	Petra	8	3	1	4	19	39	−20	10	
6	Al-Raya	8	3	0	5	29	46	−17	9	
7	Shabab Bushra	8	1	2	5	16	44	−28	5	
8	Ajloun	8	0	2	6	4	64	−60	2	
9	Doqara	8	0	1	7	3	128	−125	1	

Updated to match(es) played on 3 October 2025. Source:
Rules for classification: 1) points; 2) goal difference; 3) number of goals scored.
(C) Champions; (P) Promoted
