= Al-Ahli SC Handball (Amman) =

Handball club in Amman, Jordan

- Full name: Al-Ahli Sport Club
- Nickname: الليث الأبيض The White Lions
- Founded: 1944; 82 years ago
- President: Sameer Omar Husni Soubar
Home	Away

Al-Ahli SC Amman
Football (Men's)	Football (Women's)	Basketball	Handball	

Al-Ahli Sport Club (Arabic: النادي الأهلي الرياضي الأردني) is one of the oldest sports clubs in Jordan. Based in Amman, the club was established in 1944.

== History ==
=== Handball Team history ===
- In the end, a team receded a lot in the 1980s and barely "sniffed" in the nineties. history club (AR)
- According to the club, the team has 22 titles for the local league, but it is certified in the Jordanian league. (13 titles) missed the Ahli years of the coronation and the 1976 season. Al-Ahli returned for the 2009 to 2012 season and passed the handball in the club with many crises, including the decision to cancel the game for more than once and then return. In Al Ahly, the team went through many crises. After every crisis, Al Ahly is now considered the main breed of teams in Jordan.

== Tournaments ==
=== Jordanian Premier League ===
(13) 1993-1994-1995-1996-1997-1998-2000-2001-2009-2010-2011-2012-2015

=== Jordanian Cup ===
(13) 1994-1995-1996-1998-2000-2002-2006-2007-2008 كأس_الأردن_لكرة_اليد-2009-2012-2013-2015

=== Cup of Jordanian Cups ===
(9) 1995-1996-1998-2007-2008-2011-2012-2013-2014

=== Championship Shield Union ===
(3) 1995-1997-2006

=== Asian Club League Handball Championship ===
runners-up 1998

=== Arab Handball Championship of Champions ===
1995 5th
