= Amman International Stadium =

Stadium in Jordan

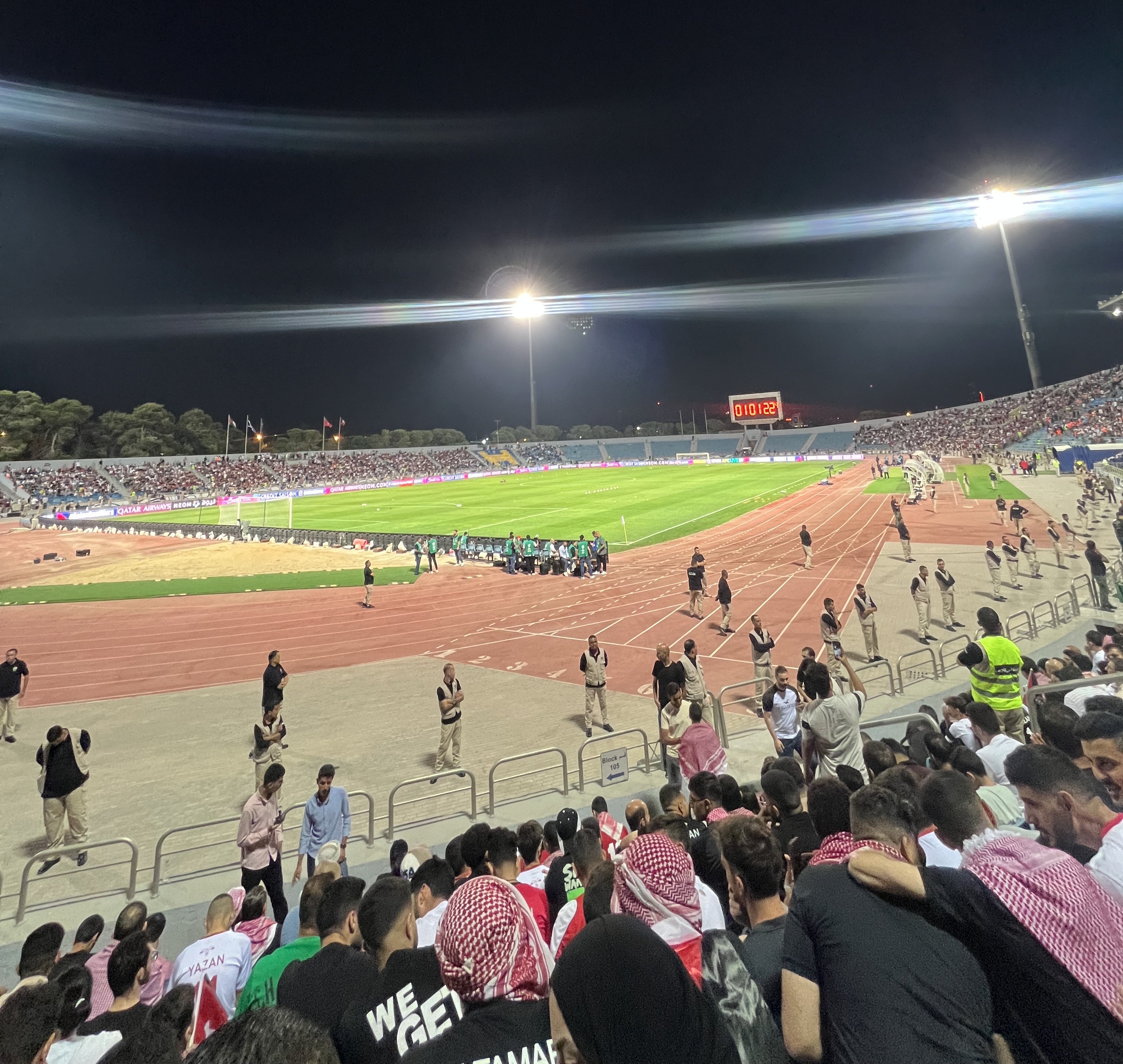
- Interactive map of Amman International Stadium
- Full name: Amman International Stadium
- Location: Al-Hussein City, Amman, Jordan
- Coordinates: 31.98516°N 35.90261°E
- Owner: Government of Jordan
- Operator: Higher Council of Youth
- Capacity: 17,619
- Surface: Grass
- Scoreboard: Yes
- Field size: 110 m × 74 m

Construction
- Built: 1964
- Opened: 1968
- Renovated: 2007, 2015
- Cost: 1,250,000 JD

Tenants
- Jordan national football team Al-Faisaly

The Amman International Stadium (Arabic: ستاد عمان الدولي) is a stadium in Al-Hussein City, Amman, Jordan. It was built in 1964 and opened in 1968. It is owned by the Government of Jordan and operated by the Higher Council of Youth. It is also the home stadium of the Jordan national football team and Al-Faisaly SC. It has a current capacity of 17,619 spectators.

== Usage ==
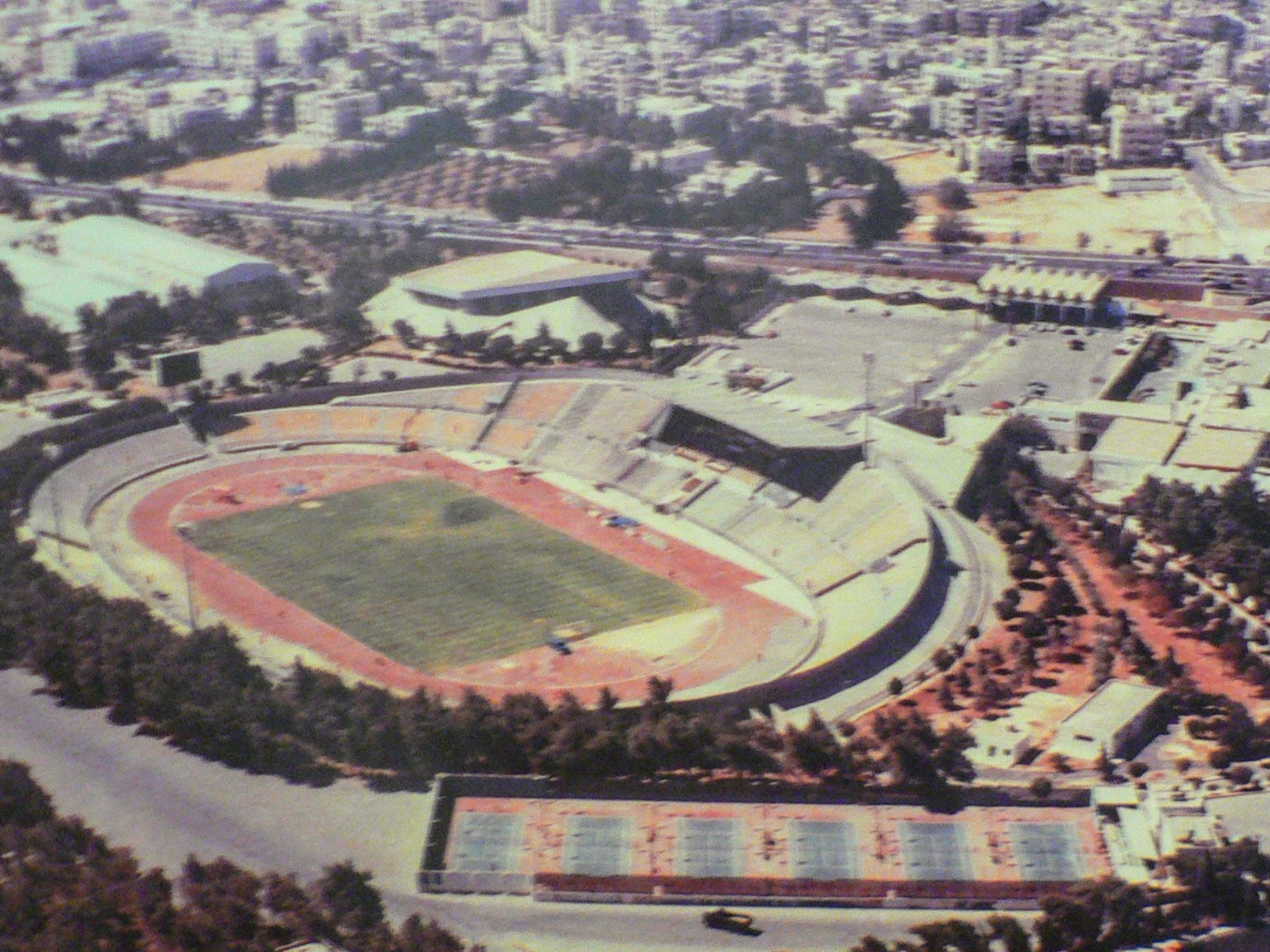
Aerial View of Amman International Stadium.

In addition to Jordan's home games, the stadium hosts other games in Jordanian football including the Jordanian Pro League, Jordan FA Cup, Jordan FA Shield and Jordan Super Cup games.

It has also hosted other tournaments such as the 2005 WAFF Women's Championship, 2007 WAFF Women's Championship, 2007 WAFF Championship, 2007 AFC Cup Finals, 2007 Asian Athletics Championships, 2010 WAFF Championship and 2016 FIFA U-17 Women's World Cup games amongst many others.

== See also ==
- Prince Hamza Hall
- Polo Stadium

| Preceded by Azadi Stadium (Iran) Tehran | West Asian Football Federation Championship; Final Venue; 2007 | Succeeded by Azadi Stadium (Iran) Tehran |
| Preceded by Incheon Munhak Stadium; Incheon | Asian Athletics Championships; Venue; 2007 | Succeeded by Guangdong Olympic Stadium; Guangzhou |
| Preceded by Estadio Nacional de Costa Rica; San José | FIFA U-17 Women's World Cup; Final Venue; 2016 | Succeeded by Estadio Charrúa; Montevideo |
