= Shin Na-yeong =

South Korean footballer (born 1999)

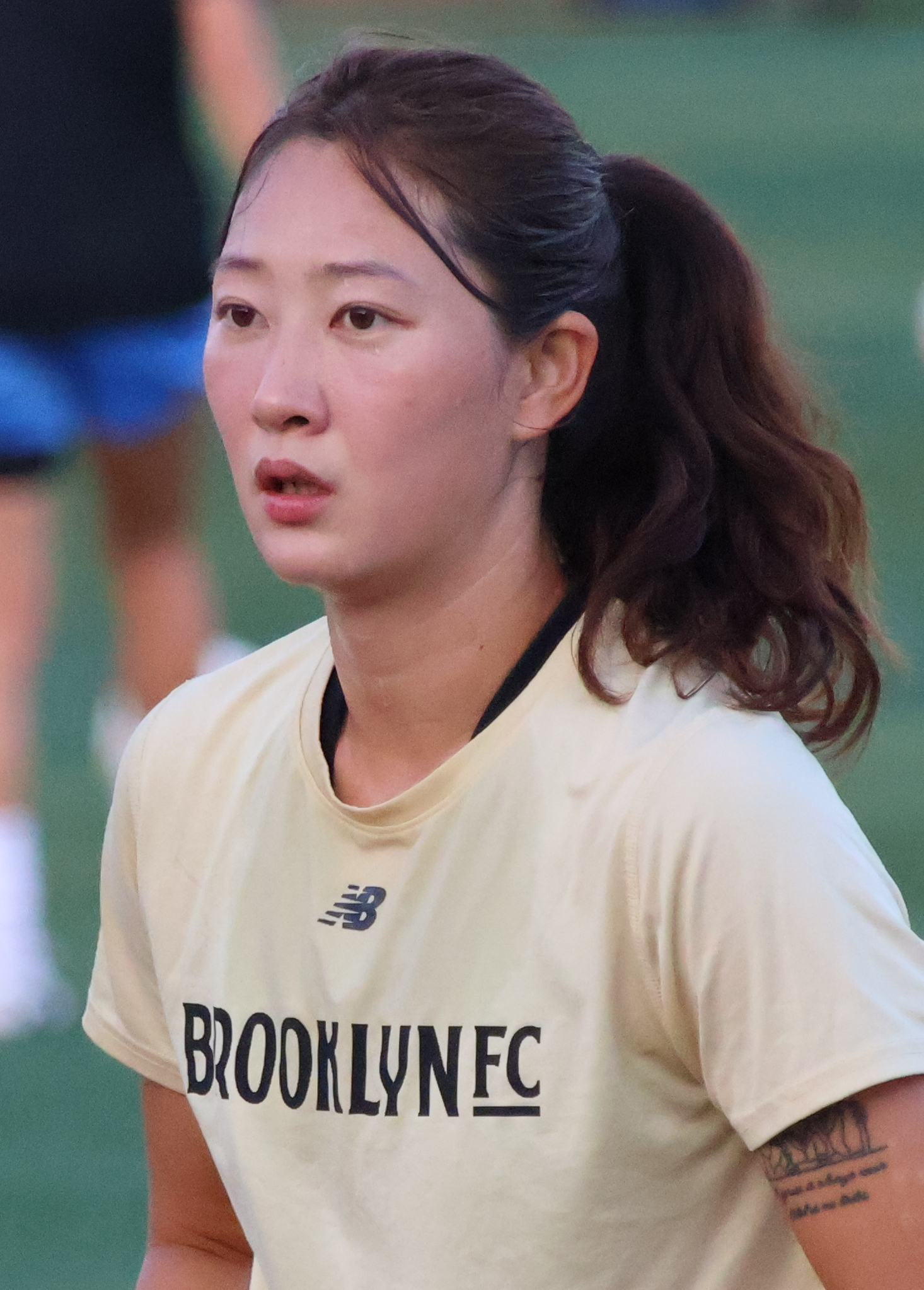
- Shin with Brooklyn FC in 2026

Personal information
- Date of birth: 9 October 1999 (age 27)
- Place of birth: Chilgok County, South Korea
- Height: 1.70 m (5 ft 7 in)
- Position: Centre-back

Team information
- Current team: Brooklyn FC
- Number: 7

Youth career
- 2012–2014: Pohang Hangdo Middle School
- 2015–2017: Chungju Yesung Girls' High School
- 2018–2019: Daeduk College

Senior career*
Years	Team	Apps	(Gls)
2020	Seoul WFC		
2021–2022	Changnyeong WFC		
2023–2024	Hwacheon KSPO		
2024–2025	Lexington SC	19	(0)
2025–	Brooklyn FC	12	(0)

International career
2017	South Korea U-19		
- South Korea U-20
2019	South Korea Universities	5	
2025–	South Korea		
- * Club domestic league appearances and goals as of 20:10, 17 May 2026 (UTC)

Shin Na-yeong (Korean: 신나영; born 9 October 1999) is a South Korean professional footballer who plays as a centre-back for USL Super League club Brooklyn FC and the South Korea national team.

== Early life ==
Shin was born in Chilgok County and became interested in football in elementary school. Despite her parents' initial objections, in the sixth grade of elementary school she left her family home and stayed with a relative in Daegu in order to attend Hwawon Elementary School, a school with a girls' football team.

== Youth career ==
While attending Pohang Hangdo Middle School, Shin was part of the team that won the 14th Unification National Women's Football Tournament, where she was also honoured with the 'Fair Play' award. She continued to play football at Chungju Yesung Girls' High School, helping take her team to the final of both the 2015 Spring KWFF Tournament and semi-final of the high school girls' football tournament at the 96th National Sports Festival. She went on to play for Daeduk College, who won two national championships and a bronze medal at the National Sports Festival in 2018. They finished as runners-up in the 2019 Spring KWFF Tournament, where Shin won the 'Best Defender' award. In the 2019 Autumn KWFF Tournament, Daeduk again finished as runners-up, and Shin was named the MVP.

== Club career ==
At the 2020 WK League new players' draft, Shin was signed by Seoul City Amazones on a one-year contract. She then played for Changnyeong WFC for two seasons before transferring to Hwacheon KSPO in 2023.

In July 2024, Shin became the third Korean footballer to play in the US, signing a contract with Lexington SC. After making 19 appearances in her first season with Lexington, she transferred to fellow USL Super League club Brooklyn FC on July 28, 2025. She debuted for Brooklyn on August 23, coming on as a second-half substitute for Jordan Thompson in the club's opening-day victory over Tampa Bay Sun FC. One week later, she made her first club start, against Dallas Trinity FC.

== International career ==
In 2017, while still at high school, Shin was named in the South Korea U-19 squad for the 2017 AFC U-19 Women's Championship in Nanjing. She also represented South Korea at the 2019 Summer Universiade in Naples, Italy. Shin received her first senior call-up for the 2025 Pink Ladies' Cup in the United Arab Emirates.
