= Hatem Abu Khadra =

Jordanian footballer

Personal information
- Full name: Hatem Ali Abu Khadra
- Date of birth: 25 July 1990 (age 36)
- Place of birth: Amman, Jordan
- Height: 1.78 m (5 ft 10 in)
- Position: Striker

Team information
- Current team: Etihad
- Number: 23

Youth career
- 2007–2010: Al-Faisaly

Senior career*
Years	Team	Apps	(Gls)
2010–2015	Al-Faisaly		
2011–2012	→ Al-Yarmouk (loan)		
2015–2017	Al-Wehdat		
2017	Shabab Al-Aqaba		
2017–2018	That Ras		
2018	Abnaa Al-Quds		
2017–2019	Al-Baqa'a		
2019–2022	Sahab		
2022–?	Al-Ahli		
2025–	Etihad		

International career
2010–2011	Jordan U23	2	(0)
- * Club domestic league appearances and goals

Hatem Ali Abu Khadra (born 1990) is a Jordanian footballer who plays as a striker for Jordanian Third Division League club Etihad.

Born in Jordan, Abu Khadra is of Palestinian origin.
