= Noura Al-Hamli =

Saudi footballer (born 1997)

Personal information
- Full name: Noura Ahmed Al-Hamli
- Date of birth: 3 September 1997 (age 29)
- Place of birth: Saudi Arabia
- Position: Forward

Team information
- Current team: Al-Nassr
- Number: 30

Senior career*
Years	Team	Apps	(Gls)
2022–2024	Al-Hilal		
2025–	Al-Nassr	1	(0)
- * Club domestic league appearances and goals

Noura Ahmed Al-Hamli (Arabic: نُورَة أَحْمَد الْحَمْلِيّ; born 3 September 1997) is a Saudi footballer who plays as a forward for Saudi Women's Premier League club Al-Nassr.

== Club career ==
Al-Hamli started playing with Al Hilal in the 2022–23 season of the Saudi Women's Premier League.

In August 2023, she participated in the Jordanian-Saudi Women's Clubs Championship and scored a goal against Al-Ittihad to win Al Hilal (2–0) at King Abdullah II Stadium in Amman.

On 17 November 2023, Al-Hamli scored a goal against Al-Ittihad in the Saudi Women's Premier League, to win Al Hilal (3–2) at Inaya Medical Colleges Stadium in Riyadh.
