= Izabela Stahelin =

Brazilian professional footballer

Personal information
- Full name: Izabela Stahelin de Aguiar
- Date of birth: 10 August 1992 (age 34)
- Place of birth: Florianópolis, Brazil
- Height: 1.68 m (5 ft 6 in)
- Position: Defender

Team information
- Current team: Al-Nassr
- Number: 13

Senior career*
Years	Team	Apps	(Gls)
2013–2020	Figueirense/Paula Ramos		
2015	Avaí		
2022–2024	Al-Nassr	28	(7)
- * Club domestic league appearances and goals as of 30 December 2023

Izabela Stahelin de Aguiar (born 10 August 1992), nicknamed Bel, is a Brazilian professional footballer who last played as a defender for Al-Nassr in the Saudi Women's Premier League.

== Club career ==
Izabela started playing football at the age of 14 and has played futsal since 2013 with the team Veneno known in 2020 as Figueirense/Paula Ramos.

=== Al Nassr ===
In 2022, Izabela joined the newly acquired Al Nassr women's team to compete in the first edition of the Saudi Women's Premier League. On 19 November 2022, she scored her first goal against Eastern Flames in the 58th minute. She scored the equalizer in the final match against Al-Yamamah before Munira Al-Hamadan netted the winner for Al-Nassr to seal the first Saudi women's premier league title.

== International career ==
Izabela represented Brazil 7–side national team in the inaugural women's world cup in Rome, Italy.

== Career statistics ==
=== Club ===
As of match played 23 December 2023

Appearances and goals by club, season and competition
Club	Season	League			Cup		Continental		Other		Total	
Club	Season	Division	Apps	Goals	Apps	Goals	Apps	Goals	Apps	Goals	Apps	Goals
Al Nassr	2022–23	SWPL	14	6	–	–	—		—		14	6
Al Nassr	2023–24	SWPL	7	0	2	0	—		6	1	15	1
Al Nassr	Total		21	6	2	0	—		6	1	29	7
Career total			21	6	2	0	—		6	1	29	7

·

== Honours ==
Al-Nassr

- Saudi Women's Premier League: 2022–23,
  2023–24
- Saudi–Jordanian Women's Clubs Championship third place: 2023
