= Juanita Aguadze =

Ghanaian footballer (born 2003)

Personal information
- Date of birth: 15 May 2003 (age 23)
- Place of birth: Ghana
- Height: 1.73 m (5 ft 8 in)
- Position: Forward

Team information
- Current team: Sethu

Senior career*
Years	Team	Apps	(Gls)
2019–2022	Police Ladies		
2022–2023	Rivers Angels		
2024	Al-Nasser		
2025	Bornova Hitab	9	(4)
2025–2026	Amed	18	(2)
2026–	Sethu		

International career
2020	Ghana U-17		
- * Club domestic league appearances and goals as of 28 March 2026

Juanita Aguadze (born 15 May 2003) is a Ghanaian professional women's football forward who plays for the Indian Women's League club Sethu. She was part of the Ghana girls' national U-17 team.

== Club career ==
Between 2019 and 2022, Aguadze played for Police Ladies in Accra. She played in the Ghana Women's Premier League, and took part also at the Ghana Women's FA Cup.

She moved to Nigeria, and joined the Port Harcourt-based club Rivers Angels to play in the 2022–23 NWFL Premiership. She participated also at the Nigerian Flying Officers Cup.

She went to Jordan, and signed a deal with Al-Nasser from Amman to play in the 2024 Pro League.

Mid February 2025, Aguadze moved to Turkey and joined the İzmir-based club Bornova Hitab to play in the second half of the 2024–25 Super League season. At the end of the season, her contract was extended for one year. However, she transferred to Amed in Diyarbakır for the 2025–26 Super League.

== International career ==
Aguadze was invited to the Ghana U-17 team, nicknamed the "Black Maidens", for preparation camp of the 2020 African U-17 Women's World Cup qualification. She was included in the team to play in the qualification matches.

== Personal life ==
Juanita Aguadze was born on 15 May 2003.
