= Amman SC (women) =

Amman
- Full name: Amman Sports Club
- Founded: 2005
- Dissolved: 2022
- League: Jordan League
- 2021: Jordan League, 1st of 5 (champions)
Home colours	Away colours

Amman Sports Club (Arabic: نادي عمان الرياضي) was a women's football club based in Amman, Jordan. The club was the women's section of Amman SC, and they played in the Jordan Women's Football League until 2022.

== History ==
Amman won their first league title in the 2010–11 season, ending the dominance of Shabab Al-Ordon. They became the first Jordanian club to participate in the AFC Women's Club Championship in 2021, which they won after finishing top of their group.

Zain was noted as a significant sponsor of Amman SC.

On 7 August 2019, Amman recorded a 32-0 victory against Kafr Rakeb during the Women's Jordan Cup, highlighting the stark differences in quality between the top and bottom sides.

In May 2022, the club’s president, Mustafa al-Afouri, announced its dissolution due to 2.5 years of unpaid funds from the Jordan Football Association (JFA).

== Notable players ==
The following players have either played at the professional or international level, either before, during or after playing for Amman FC:

- (Jordan) Shahnaz Jibreen
- (Jordan) Zaina Hazem

== Honours ==
=== Domestic ===
- Jordan Women's Football League
  - Champions (5): 2010–11, 2014–15, 2016–17, 2020, 2021

=== Continental ===
- AFC Women's Club Championship
  - Champions (1): 2021
