= Al-Ahli SC (Amman, women) =

Jordanian women's football club from Amman

Al-Ahli
- Full name: Al-Ahli Sport Club
- Founded: 2019; 7 years ago
- Ground: Polo Stadium
- Capacity: 2,000
- Chairman: Awni Naghway Dudu
- League: Jordan Women's First Division League
- 2023: Jordan Women's First Division League, 2nd of 9
- Website: http://www.ahliclubjo.org/
Home colours	Away colours	Third colours

Al-Ahli Sport Club (Arabic: النادي الأهلي الرياضي الأردني السيدات), is a Jordanian women's football club based in Amman, Jordan. They compete in the Jordan Women's First Division League, the second tier of Jordanian football.

== History ==
Established in 1944, Al-Ahli is considered to be one of the oldest clubs in Jordan. Represented by the Circassian community under the initial name of Koban Club, their current name was honourably given by the late king Abdullah Bin al Hussein I.

Al-Ahli achieved history when it won the 2022 Jordan Women's Pro League for the first time in the club's history.

However, Al-Ahli was unable to defend its title the following season and withdrew from the 2023 Jordan Women's Pro League season. Al-Ahli would later participate in the 2023 Jordan Women's First Division League, where they finished as runners-up of the competition.

== Honours ==
=== Domestic ===
- Jordan Women's Football League
  - Champions (1): 2022

== Current squad ==
As of 9 December 2024

Note: Flags indicate national team as defined under FIFA eligibility rules; some limited exceptions apply. Players may hold more than one non-FIFA nationality.

No.	Pos.	Nation	Player
—		JOR	Yaffa Jubran
—		JOR	Sofia Abu Ras
—		JOR	Bisaan Jubran
—		JOR	Shahad Al-Dhahabi
—		JOR	Sama Al-Rosan
—		JOR	Sofia Hatter
—		JOR	Lama Al-Qudah

No.	Pos.	Nation	Player
—		JOR	Dana Ayad
—		JOR	Salam Al-Barbirawi
—		JOR	Naya Haddad
—		JOR	Yasmine Battah
—		JOR	Marah Al-Khudar
—		JOR	Farah Shehab
—		JOR	Marah Al-Qaryouti

== Notable players ==
The following players have either played at the professional or international level, either before, during or after playing for Al-Ahli SC:

- (Jordan) Bana Al-Bitar
- (Jordan) Raya Hina
- (Jordan) Rouzbahan Fraij
- (Jordan) Mai Sweilem
- (Jordan) Natasha Al-Naber
- (Ghana) Naomi Anima

== See also ==
- Al-Ahli SC (men's)
- Al-Ahli SC Basketball
- Al-Ahli SC Handball
