= Bana Al-Bitar =

Jordanian footballer

Personal information
- Full name: Bana Zaid Walid Al-Bitar
- Date of birth: 6 October 1996 (age 30)
- Place of birth: Amman, Jordan
- Position: Forward

Team information
- Current team: Amman FC
- Number: 10

Senior career*
Years	Team	Apps	(Gls)
–2019	Orthodox		
2021	Al-Qadisiyah		
2022	Al-Ahli		
2023	Amman FC		
2024	Jeddah		
2024–	Amman FC		

International career^{‡}
2021–	Jordan	36	(5)
- * Club domestic league appearances and goals ‡ National team caps and goals as of 8 April 2025

Bana Zaid Walid Al-Bitar (Arabic: بانة البيطار; born 6 October 1996) is a Jordanian footballer who plays as a forward for the Jordan women's national team.

== Club career ==
=== Al-Qadsiyah ===
Al-Bitar played for Jordanian club Al-Qadsiyah and won the top scorer of the 2021 Jordan Women's Pro League. Despite registering 30 goals in that competition, her top-scorers award was completely absent from the awards ceremony.

== International goals ==
No.	Date	Venue	Opponent	Score	Result	Competition
1.	19 September 2021	Milliy Stadium, Tashkent, Uzbekistan	Bangladesh	2–0	5–0	2022 AFC Women's Asian Cup qualification
2.	29 August 2022	Petra Stadium, Amman, Jordan	Syria	3–0	4–0	2022 WAFF Women's Championship
3.	1 September 2022	Petra Stadium, Amman, Jordan	Lebanon	1–0	2–1	2022 WAFF Women's Championship
4.	4 September 2022	Petra Stadium, Amman, Jordan	Palestine	2–0	4–0	2022 WAFF Women's Championship
5.	29 October 2024	Emirhan Sport Complex, Antalya, Turkey	Chinese Taipei	1–1	1–3	2024 Pink Ladies Cup
6.	3 June 2025	King Abdullah II Stadium, Amman, Jordan	Bangladesh	2–1	2–2	Friendly
7.	7 July 2025	King Abdullah II Stadium, Amman, Jordan	Lebanon	3–0	4–0	2026 AFC Women's Asian Cup qualification
8.	13 July 2025	King Abdullah II Stadium, Amman, Jordan	Singapore	2–0	5–0	2026 AFC Women's Asian Cup qualification
