= Razan Al-Zagha =

Jordanian footballer

Personal information
- Full name: Razan Moh'd Samir Moh'd Yaser Al-Zagha
- Date of birth: 23 March 1995 (age 31)
- Place of birth: Amman, Jordan
- Position: Forward

International career^{‡}
Years	Team	Apps	(Gls)
	Jordan U19	1+	(1)
2013–	Jordan	1	(0)
- ‡ National team caps and goals as of 15 January 2019

Razan Moh'd Samir Moh'd Yaser Al-Zagha (born 23 March 1995) is a Jordanian footballer who plays as a forward for the Jordan women's national team.
