= Nour Zoqash =

Jordanian footballer

Personal information
- Full name: Nour Mahmoud Rajab Zoqash
- Date of birth: 1 September 1999 (age 27)
- Place of birth: Amman, Jordan
- Height: 1.64 m (5 ft 5 in)
- Position: Defender

Team information
- Current team: Shabab Al-Ordon
- Number: 3

Youth career
- Orthodox Club

Senior career*
Years	Team	Apps	(Gls)
- Shabab Al-Ordon

International career^{‡}
	Jordan U13		(2)
	Jordan U14		(3)
	Jordan U16		(3)
2016	Jordan U17	3	(0)
2017–	Jordan	49	(0)
- * Club domestic league appearances and goals ‡ National team caps and goals as of 8 April 2025

Nour Mahmoud Rajab Zoqash (born 1 September 1999), known as Nour Zoqash (Arabic: نور زوقش), is a Jordanian footballer who plays as a defender for local Women's League club Shabab Al-Ordon and the Jordan women's national team.
