= Rouzbahan Fraij =

Jordanian footballer (born 2000)

Personal information
- Full name: Rouzbahan Raed Abdulrahman Fraij
- Date of birth: 7 April 2000 (age 26)
- Place of birth: Amman, Jordan
- Height: 1.55 m (5 ft 1 in)
- Position: Midfielder

Team information
- Current team: Etihad Club
- Number: 97

Youth career
- –2018: International School of Choueifat

Senior career*
Years	Team	Apps	(Gls)
2019–2023	Shabab Al-Ordon		
2023–	Etihad Club		

International career^{‡}
2016	Jordan U17	3	(0)
2018	Jordan U19	3	(1)
2017–	Jordan	63	(4)
- * Club domestic league appearances and goals ‡ National team caps and goals as of 8 April 2025

Rouzbahan Raed Abdulrahman Fraij (Arabic: روزبهان رائد عبد الرحمن فريج; born 7 April 2000) is a Jordanian footballer who plays as a midfielder for Jordanian club Etihad Club and the Jordan national team.

== Personal life ==
Fraij attended the International School of Choueifat – Amman.

== Career statistics ==
=== International ===
Scores and results list Jordan's goal tally first, score column indicates score after each Fraij goal.

List of international goals scored by Rouzbahan Fraij
No.	Date	Venue	Opponent	Score	Result	Competition
1	3 September 2021	Osman Ahmed Osman Stadium, Cairo, Egypt	Egypt	3–1	5–2	2021 Arab Women's Cup
2	3 September 2021	Osman Ahmed Osman Stadium, Cairo, Egypt	Egypt	5–2	5–2	2021 Arab Women's Cup
