= Zaina Hazem =

Jordanian footballer

Personal information
- Full name: Zaina Hazem Faisal Hassan
- Date of birth: 8 July 2004 (age 22)
- Place of birth: Amman, Jordan
- Position: Defensive midfielder

International career^{‡}
Years	Team	Apps	(Gls)
2016	Jordan U14	3	(1)
2018	Jordan U16	4	(1)
2018	Jordan U19	3	(0)
2019–	Jordan	22	(2)
- ‡ National team caps and goals as of 8 April 2025

Zaina Hazem Faisal Hassan (born 8 July 2004), also known as Zaina Hazem (Arabic: زينة حازم), is a Jordanian footballer who plays as a defensive midfielder for the Jordan women's national team.

== Seasons and career profile ==
Season	Team	Goals	Yellow Cards	Red Cards	
Season	Team	Goals	Yellow Cards	2nd Yellow	Direct
AFC WOMEN'S ASIAN CUP 2022	JORDAN	0	0	0	0
AFC U-19 WOMEN'S CHAMPIONSHIP 2019	JORDAN	0	0	0	0
AFC U-16 WOMEN'S CHAMPIONSHIP 2019	JORDAN	1	1	0	0
WOMEN`S OLYMPIC FOOTBALL TOURNAMENT 2020	JORDAN	0	0	0	0
AFC U-14 GIRLS' REGIONAL CHAMPIONSHIP 2016	JORDAN	1	0	0	0
WOMEN'S CLUB CHAMPIONSHIP 2021	AMMAN CLUB (JOR)	0	0	0	0

== International goals ==
No.	Date	Venue	Opponent	Score	Result	Competition
1.	23 February 2024	King Abdullah Sports City, Jeddah, Saudi Arabia	Lebanon	1–0	2–0	2022 WAFF Women's Championship
2.	8 April 2025	30 June Stadium, Cairo, Egypt	Egypt	1–2	1–5	Friendly
