= Al-Nasser SC (women) =

Association football club in Amman, Jordan

Al-Nasser
- Full name: Al-Nasser Sports Club
- Founded: 1978; 48 years ago
- Ground: Polo Stadium
- Capacity: 2,000
- League: Jordan Women's Pro League
- 2025: Jordan Women's First Division League, 1st of 9 (promoted)

The previous logo of Al-Nasser SC

Al-Nasser Sports Club (Arabic: نادي النصر الرياضي) is a professional women's football club based in Al-Nasr, Amman, Jordan. The club most recently played in the Jordan Women's First Division League, the second tier of Jordanian women's football.

== History ==
Al-Nasser finished as runners-up of the 2021 Jordan Women's First Division League season, finishing below 6 Yard Football Academy.

Al-Nasser was one of four Jordanian clubs that participated in the 2023 Jordanian-Saudi Women's Clubs Championship. They defeated Al Nassr (Saudi Arabia) 2–1. However, Al-Nasser were unable to advance to the semi-finals of the competition, finishing last-place in their group.

The club also participated in the 2023 Jordan Women's Pro League, where they finished at the penultimate spot. Their U19 squad also finished runners-up, losing their final match to Etihad Club's U19 squad.

Al-Nasser participated in the 2024 Jordan Women's FA Cup, to which they won third place, after defeating Amman FC 1–0 in the third-place play-off. However, Al-Nasser were also relegated to the 2025 Jordan Women's First Division League, after finishing in last place with a total of 6 points that same season.

On 22 September 2025, Al-Nasser were declared as winners of the 2025 Jordan Women's First Division League, regaining its spot back to the Jordan Women's Pro League for the following season.

== Current squad ==
As of 18 September 2024

Note: Flags indicate national team as defined under FIFA eligibility rules; some limited exceptions apply. Players may hold more than one non-FIFA nationality.

| No. | Pos. | Nation | Player |
|---|---|---|---|
| — | | JOR | Aya Al-Mhawish |
| — | DF | JOR | Anfal Al-Sufy |
| — | FW | JOR | Tahreer Al-Qawasameh |
| — | | JOR | Taqwa Ziyad |
| — | DF | JOR | Tamara Ahmed |
| — | FW | GHA | Juanita Aguadze |
| — | | JOR | Khetam Shqair |
| — | | GHA | Rabi Musa |
| — | | JOR | Raghad Tarawneh |
| — | | JOR | Ranad Al-Shwaiki |
| — | | JOR | Raneem Daoud |
| — | | JOR | Rose Ali |

| No. | Pos. | Nation | Player |
|---|---|---|---|
| — | | JOR | Rawat Ziyad |
| — | | JOR | Retaj Arafa |
| — | | JOR | Shahad Abdel Halim |
| — | | JOR | Sabreen Al-Rawaqa |
| — | DF | JOR | Alia Hasan |
| — | | JOR | Farha Mansour |
| — | FW | JOR | Luna Al-Momani |
| — | FW | JOR | Maya Owaisat |
| — | DF | JOR | Masar Athamnah |
| — | | JOR | Maysam Al-Aqtash |
