= Amman FC (women) =

Jordanian association football club from Amman

- Full name: Amman Football Club
- Founded: 2008; 18 years ago
- Ground: Polo Stadium
- Capacity: 2,000
- League: Jordan Women's Pro League
- 2024: Jordan Women's Pro League, 2nd of 6
- Website: https://www.facebook.com/AmmanFC/

Amman FC (Arabic: FC عمان) is a Jordanian professional women's football club based in Amman, Jordan. It currently competes in the Jordan Women's Pro League, the top tier of Jordanian football.

== History ==
Amman FC was officially announced on 9 May 2015, during a ceremony sponsored by the Mayor of Amman, Aqel Biltaji. The event was attended by notable figures, including former Prime Minister Taher Masri, who sponsored the event. Mayor Beltaji emphasized the club's role in promoting and developing Jordanian sports, particularly for youth, who are viewed as essential for societal advancement. Ghassan Nuqul, the club’s president, highlighted the commitment to fostering discipline and teamwork among young athletes, with programs available for age groups ranging from 7 to 17, as well as a special team for girls. The club aims to strengthen community ties and enhance the youth sector in Jordan.

As a club, Amman FC is noted for their successful youth and women's footballing programs, as well their emerging men's program.

During the 2022 Jordan Women's First Division League season, Amman FC was noted for having maintained a considerable gap, following a decisive 13–1 victory over Shabab Bushra and gaining 24 points by round 9 of the season.

Amman FC then participated in the 2023 Jordanian-Saudi Women's Clubs Championship, representing various Jordanian teams that tournament. The team was coached by Hussam Abu Riash, who stated that the team was prepared to face Al Hilal, as well as highlighting the benefits of such a tournament for the club. After they finished their group as runners-up, they eventually defeated Al Nassr 4–0 to reach the final, to which they lost 2–1 to Etihad Club. Amman FC later finished the 2023 Jordan Women's Pro League in third place.

As a part of Zain Jordan's strategic partnership initiative, the telecommunications company sponsored Amman FC since 2023.

The club proceeded to gain a spot from last season, finishing as runners-up of the 2024 Jordan Women's Pro League.

== Current squad ==
As of 18 September 2024

Note: Flags indicate national team as defined under FIFA eligibility rules; some limited exceptions apply. Players may hold more than one non-FIFA nationality.

No.	Pos.	Nation	Player
—	MF	JOR	Arwa Batayneh
—	FW	JOR	Bana Al-Bitar
—	FW	JOR	Tala Al-Barghouthy
—		JOR	Jana Issawi
—	MF	GHA	Joyce Larbi
—		JOR	Rama Al-Khashouk
—		JOR	Rama Awad
—	FW	JOR	Razan Al-Zagha
—	DF	JOR	Rand Abu-Hussein

No.	Pos.	Nation	Player
—		JOR	Celine Seif
—		JOR	Christina Jouaneh
—		GHA	Constance Achia
—		JOR	Layan Ajarmeh
—		JOR	Masa Ziadeh
—		JOR	Marah Abbas
—		JOR	Muna Saheb
—		JOR	Nahla Abdel Hadi
—	DF	JOR	Haya Khalil

== See also ==
- Amman FC
