= Al-Istiqlal Club =

Association football club in Amman, Jordan

Istiqlal Club
- Full name: Al-Istiqlal Club
- Founded: 1986; 40 years ago
- Ground: Polo Stadium
- Capacity: 2,000
- League: Jordan Women's Pro League
- 2024: Jordan Women's Pro League, 4th of 6

Al-Istiqlal Club (Arabic: نادي الاستقلال) is a women's football club based in Amman, Jordan. The club plays in the Jordan Women's Pro League, the top tier of Jordanian women's football.

== History ==
The club was founded in 1986. The club's main commitment is to develop women's football in Jordan. On 25 September 2008, the club appointed Hisham Al-Sharari as the club's president for the next two years.

On 2 April 2015, Al-Istiqlal's star player Rawan Al-Tal explained the team's ambition to remain in the 2015 Jordan Women's Pro League and not drop to the second tier. On 4 November 2015, Zakaria Hijazi was appointed as chairman of the board of directors of the club.

On 20 August 2016, Istiqlal appointed Syrian Rudayna Agha Chechany as manager of the club.

In May 2018, Istiqlal organized and hosted a Ramadan five-a-side football tournament, consisting of 8 women's clubs around Jordan.

On 29 April 2019, Istiqlal signed two Tunisian footballers, Ghada Ayadi and Samia Aouni, which marked the first time that a Jordanian women's club signed players abroad in the Jordan Women's Pro League. Their investment yielded positive results, as Istiqlal found themselves to be top of the 2019 Jordan Women's Pro League after two matches played.

On 24 November 2021, Zakaria Omar Hijazi was reelected as president of the club.

On 5 January 2022, Istiqlal were threatened with dissolving the club, after treasurer and head of the sports committee Ayman Al-Fawuri complained about overdue payments from the Jordan Football Association since November 2021. On 17 May 2022, board of directors member Aroub Al-Abadi applied to run in the Jordan Football Association elections, with the support of Ayoub Al-Fawuri.

On 21 October 2023, Ali Al-Amayreh won the presidential election of Al-Istiqlal Club.

During the 2023 Jordan Women's Pro League season, Istiqlal were the only club who had hired a female manager by way of 34-year old Sarah Al-Shehabi, with the other 4 clubs hiring male managers. She departed the following season, joining Amman FC as an assistant manager.

== Current squad ==
As of 18 September 2024

Note: Flags indicate national team as defined under FIFA eligibility rules; some limited exceptions apply. Players may hold more than one non-FIFA nationality.

No.	Pos.	Nation	Player
—		IRQ	Aryam Al-Zuhairi
—	GK	JOR	Joud Al-Abadi
—		JOR	Joud Asfour
—		JOR	Dima Wadian
—		JOR	Raghad Al-Nuaimi
—		JOR	Rafal Taha
—	FW	JOR	Retal Al-Shobaki
—		JOR	Sabaa Al-Sokoor
—		GHA	Adongo Safia
—		JOR	Ola Awad

No.	Pos.	Nation	Player
—	FW	GHA	Veronica Appiah
—		JOR	Christine Hijazi
—		JOR	Larisa Al-Firash
—		JOR	Layan Obaid
—		JOR	Malak Kkadrawi
—	MF	GHA	Nana Yaa Mingle Andoh
—		JOR	Natalie Al-Masarwa
—		JOR	Hadeel Al-Masri
—	MF	JOR	Yasmine Al-Ajrab
