= Orthodox Club (women's football) =

Jordanian women's football club from Amman

- Full name: Orthodox Club
- Nickname: The Reds
- Founded: 1952; 73 years ago
- Ground: Polo Stadium
- Capacity: 2,000
- League: Jordan Women's Pro League
- 2024: Jordan Women's Pro League, 3rd of 6
- Website: https://orthodoxclub.com/

Orthodox Club (Arabic: النادي الكرة قدم الأرثوذكسي), also known simply as Orthodox or Orthodox Amman, is a women's professional football club based in Abdoun, Amman, Jordan. The club plays in the Jordan Women's Pro League, the top tier of Jordanian women's football.

== History ==
Orthodox Club was founded in 1952, representing Jordanian Christian community. The club is best known for their basketball program. The club used to host a men's football team, to which they reached the First Division League back in the 1970s. Men's football is no longer present at Orthodox Club. However, the sport is still present through its women's football club. Jordan is considered among the pioneers of women's football in the region, to which Orthodox Club helped establish that association.

In February 2006, Orthodox, alongside Amman, represented Jordanian teams at the inaugural Arab Women’s Football Championship in Abu Dhabi.

On 30 November 2011, the Orthodox women's branch participated in various friendlies in the city of Ramallah, including the footballing branch of the club. Other sports included basketball, table tennis and swimming.

In 2013, Orthodox participated in the third edition of the Discover Football Festival in Berlin, to which the tournament aimed to promote women's football and women's rights.

On 25 May 2022, Orthodox Club announced a comprehensive restructuring of its women's football team with the aim of enhancing its competitiveness in local, Arab, and continental championships. On 7 July 2022, Orthodox Club represented Jordan at the 2022 WAFF Women's Clubs Championship, where they eventually reached the final of the competition.

Orthodox Club finished as runners-up of the 2023 Jordan Women's Pro League, finishing behind first-time champions Etihad Club. The following season, Orthodox Club looked to have been among the favorites to win the 2024 Jordan Women's Pro League, after securing some strong signings. However, they ultimately finished in 3rd place, one place below from last season.

== Current squad ==
As of 18 September 2024

Note: Flags indicate national team as defined under FIFA eligibility rules; some limited exceptions apply. Players may hold more than one non-FIFA nationality.

No.	Pos.	Nation	Player
—	MF	JOR	Tasneem Abu-Rob
—		JOR	Jinan Saeed
—	GK	JOR	Joud Al-Shanty
—		JOR	Hala Al-Ramaneh
—	DF	GHA	Rahama Jafaru
—		JOR	Zeina Daoud
—		JOR	Sara Jamal
—		JOR	Sally Aseid
—		JOR	Salwa Khalil
—		JOR	Siwar Obaid

No.	Pos.	Nation	Player
—		JOR	Shatha Sahawneh
—		JOR	Sophia Haddad
—		JOR	Lana Shahatit
—	DF	JOR	Lama Al-Omari
—	DF	JOR	Lujain Al-Btoush
—		JOR	Malak Al-Sayed
—		JOR	Mira Attari
—	MF	JOR	Noor Al Mashayek
—	DF	JOR	Nour Zoqash
—	DF	GHA	Naomi Anima

== Notable players ==
The following players have either played at the professional or international level, either before, during or after playing for Orthodox Club:

- (Jordan) Abeer Rantisi
- (Egypt) Magi Magdy
- (Egypt) Menna Tarek
- (Jordan) Stephanie Naber
