= Etihad Club =

Association football club in Amman, Jordan

Etihad
- Full name: Etihad Club
- Founded: 2018; 8 years ago
- Ground: Polo Stadium
- Capacity: 2,000
- Chairman: Omar Al-Hadid
- League: Jordan Women's Pro League (women); Jordanian Third Division League (men)
- 2025–26 2025: Jordan Women's Pro League, 1st of 6 (champions, women); Jordanian Third Division League – Group 3, round of 16 (men)
- Website: Official website
Home colours	Away colours

Etihad Club (Arabic: نادي الاتحاد) is a professional football club based in Amman, Jordan. The club plays in the Jordan Women's Pro League, the top tier of Jordanian women's football. It also plays in the Jordanian Third Division League, the fourth tier of Jordanian men's football.

== History ==
=== Women's football ===
The club was originally founded in 2018 under the name 6 Yard Football Academy, aimed at nurturing young talents in sports. In July 2019, Joel Cornelli, a Brazilian coach, took on the role of manager of the academy, with Stephanie Al-Naber and Hebah Fakhereddin as assistant coaches. Two years later, the club achieved the Division 1 title in their first participation, securing promotion to the Jordan Women's Football League, rebranding as Etihad Club in 2022. In July 2023, Cornelli transitioned to coaching the first team during the championship round, replacing Lebanese coach Wael Gharzeddine. They eventually clinched their first league title, earning a spot in the inaugural 2024–25 AFC Women's Champions League and the WAFF Women's Clubs Championship.

=== Men's football ===
The men's senior football team first participated at the 2023 Jordanian Third Division League season, having been eliminated on penalties to Shabab Hauran in the round of 32. Led by sports consultant and former Jordan national football team manager Adnan Hamad, as well as manager Odai Al-Saify and goalkeeper coach Lo'ai Al-Amaireh, the 2025 Jordanian Third Division League season saw them narrowly lose on the round of 16 to Shabab Hwarah.

== Honours ==
=== Domestic ===
==== Women's football ====
- Jordan Women's Pro League
  - Champions (3): 2023, 2024, 2025–26
- Women's Jordan Cup
  - Champions (2): 2024, 2025
  - Runners-up (1): 2022

== Current squad ==
=== Women's squad ===
As of 25 August 2025

Note: Flags indicate national team as defined under FIFA eligibility rules; some limited exceptions apply. Players may hold more than one non-FIFA nationality.

No.	Pos.	Nation	Player
1	GK	JOR	Sherin Al-Shalabe (captain)
2	DF	JOR	Taqi Ghazi
3	DF	JOR	Alanoud Ghazi
4	DF	JOR	Yasmeen Al-Ajrab
8	DF	JOR	Zaina Hazem
9	FW	JOR	Janna Ma'touq
10	MF	JOR	Enas Al-Jamaeen
11	FW	MOZ	Ninika
12	GK	JOR	Sajida Issa
14	FW	JOR	Lina Al-Saheb

No.	Pos.	Nation	Player
15	MF	JOR	Mai Sweilem
16	FW	JOR	Kinda Al-Titi
18	FW	GHA	Eugenia Tetteh
20	DF	GHA	Takia Zakaria
22	DF	GHA	Lydia Krampah
24	MF	NEP	Preeti Rai
77	DF	GHA	Naomi Anima
81	GK	JOR	Malak Shannak
97	MF	JOR	Rouzbahan Fraij
98	MF	JOR	Lana Feras

=== Men's squad ===
As of 13 September 2025

Note: Flags indicate national team as defined under FIFA eligibility rules; some limited exceptions apply. Players may hold more than one non-FIFA nationality.

No.	Pos.	Nation	Player
1	GK	JOR	Sami Al-Joulani
3	DF	JOR	Ahed Shahadat
4	MF	JOR	Omar Al-Khatib
6	MF	JOR	Zaid Al-Sayed
7	MF	JOR	Anas Al-Mhsere
9	FW	JOR	Mohammad Shahda
10	MF	PLE	Mus'ab Mubarak
16	FW	JOR	Mohammad Zahran
17	DF	JOR	Moayad Al-Khaleelah
18	GK	JOR	Abdullah Al-Awawdeh
19	DF	JOR	Deya Al-Din Hamdan
21	MF	JOR	Saleh Fraij

No.	Pos.	Nation	Player
22	DF	JOR	Yousef Ahmad
23	FW	JOR	Hatem Abu Khadra (captain)
70	MF	IRQ	Mohammad Adnan Hamad
90	MF	JOR	Qais Al-Shawashreh
—		JOR	Yamen Al-Hefnawi
—		JOR	Walid Alian
—		JOR	Adel Abu Khadra
—		JOR	Mohammad Amro
—		JOR	Khaled Abu Ryash
—		JOR	Abdulrahman Abu Hweiti
—		JOR	Mohammad Nemer

==== Out on loan ====
As of 2 September 2026

Note: Flags indicate national team as defined under FIFA eligibility rules; some limited exceptions apply. Players may hold more than one non-FIFA nationality.

No.	Pos.	Nation	Player
—	MF	JOR	Saleh Fraij (at Al-Salt until 30 June 2027)
—	MF	JOR	Qais Al-Shawashreh (at Al-Salt until 30 June 2027)
—	DF	JOR	Hamzeh Al-Ghabeesh (at Al-Salt until 30 June 2027)
—	DF	JOR	Omar Al-Khatib (at Doqara until 30 June 2027)
—	DF	JOR	Ahed Shahadat (at Doqara until 30 June 2027)
