= Jordan Women's Pro League =

Football tournament in Jordan

- Founded: 2005; 21 years ago
- Country: Jordan
- Confederation: AFC
- Number of clubs: 6
- Level on pyramid: 1
- Relegation to: Jordan Women's First Division League
- Domestic cup: Women's Jordan Cup
- International cup(s): AFC Women's Champions League; WAFF Women's Clubs Championship
- Current champions: Etihad (2025–26)
- Most championships: Shabab Al-Ordon (9 titles)
- Website: jfa.jo (in Arabic)
- Current: 2026–27 Jordan Women's Pro League

The Jordan Women's Pro League (Arabic: الدوري الأردني النسوي للمحترفات) is the highest level of women's football in Jordan. Along with the First Division, it forms the league system. It is run by the Jordan Football Association and began in 2005.

The league has been known under names throughout its history: 1st Women's League in 2005, Orange A League between 2013 and 2015, Division 1 from 2015–16 to 2018, and Jordan Women's Pro League since the 2019 season.

== Champions ==
=== Wins by year ===
No.	Season	Champion
1	2005–06	Shabab Al-Ordon
2	2006–07	Shabab Al-Ordon
3	2007–08	Shabab Al-Ordon
4	2008–09	Shabab Al-Ordon
5	2009–10	Shabab Al-Ordon
6	2010–11	Amman
7	2011–12	Shabab Al-Ordon
	2012–13	not held
8	2013–14	Shabab Al-Ordon
9	2014–15	Amman
10	2015–16	Shabab Al-Ordon
11	2016–17	Amman
	2018	abandoned
12	2019	Shabab Al-Ordon
13	2020	Amman
14	2021	Amman
15	2022	Al-Ahli
16	2023	Etihad
17	2024	Etihad
18	2025–26	Etihad
19	2026–27	

=== Wins by club ===
Club	Wins	Winning years
Shabab Al-Ordon	9	2005–06, 2006–07, 2007–08, 2008–09, 2009–10, 2011–12, 2013–14, 2015–16, 2019
Amman	5	2010–11, 2014–15, 2016–17, 2020, 2021
Etihad	3	2023, 2024, 2025–26
Al-Ahli	1	2022

== See also ==
- Jordan women's national football team
- Jordanian Pro League
- AFC Women's Club Championship
- Football in Jordan
