= Polo Stadium (Amman) =

Multi-purpose stadium in Amman, Jordan

Coordinates: 31.981348°N 35.909336°E

Polo Stadium ملعب البولو
- Interactive map of Polo Stadium ملعب البولو
- Full name: Polo Stadium
- Location: Amman, Jordan
- Owner: Government of Jordan
- Operator: Higher Council of Youth
- Capacity: 2,000

Tenants
- Jordan women's national football team Jordan Women's Pro League

Polo Stadium (Arabic: ملعب البولو) is a multi-purpose stadium in Al-Hussein City, Amman, Jordan. It is currently used mostly for football matches. The stadium holds 2,000 people. The stadium was opened in 2013, with the financial support of FIFA.

== See also ==
- Amman International Stadium
- Prince Hamza Hall
