= Jordan Women's First Division League =

Football tournament in Jordan

- Founded: 2011; 15 years ago
- Country: Jordan
- Confederation: AFC
- Number of clubs: 8
- Level on pyramid: 2
- Promotion to: Jordan Women's Pro League
- Current champions: Shafa Badran (2026)
- Website: jfa.jo (in Arabic)
- Current: 2026 Jordan Women's First Division League

The Jordan Women's First Division League (Arabic: دوري الدرجة الاولى للسيدات الأردنية) is the second-level league of women's football in Jordan. Along with the Pro League, it forms the league system. It is run by the Jordan Football Association and began in 2011.

The league has been known under names throughout its history: Jordanian Women's League - Orange B between the 2011–12 and 2015–16 seasons, Jordan Women's League Second Division in the 2019 season, and Jordan Women's First Division League since the 2021 season.

== Format ==
The competition follows a one-stage league format, where the team with the highest points at the end gets crowned as champions, as well as gain direct promotion to the Jordan Women's Pro League in the following season.

== Champions ==
=== Wins by year ===
No.	Season	Champion
1	2011–12	Al-Zarqa
2	2014–15	Al-Zarqa
3	2015–16	Al-Hussein
4	2019	Al-Qadsiyah
5	2021	6 Yard Football Academy
6	2022	Amman FC
7	2023	Al-Hussein
8	2024	Nashama Al-Mustaqbal
9	2025	Al-Nasser
10	2026	Shafa Badran
11	2027	

=== Wins by club ===
Club	Wins	Winning years
Al-Zarqa	2	2011–12, 2014–15
Al-Hussein	2	2015–16, 2023
Al-Qadsiyah	1	2019
6 Yard Football Academy	1	2021
Amman FC	1	2022
Nashama Al-Mustaqbal	1	2024
Al-Nasser	1	2025
Shafa Badran	1	2026

== See also ==
- Jordan women's national football team
- Jordan Women's Pro League
- Football in Jordan
- Jordanian football league system
