= Al-Hussein SC =

Al-Hussein SC may refer to:

- Al-Hussein SC (Irbid), a men's football club in Jordan
- Al-Hussein SC (Irbid, women), a women's football club in Jordan
- Al-Hussein SC (Iraq), an Iraqi football club based in Baghdad
- Shabab Al-Hussein SC, a Jordanian football club based in Amman, Jordan
