= 2026 Jordan Women's First Division League =

Jordan Women's First Division League
- Season: 2026
- Dates: 1 August 2026 – 15 September 2026
- Champions: Shafa Badran
- Promoted: Shafa Badran
- Matches: 28
- Goals: 302 (10.79 per match)
- Biggest home win: Al-Ahli 20-0 Al-Raya (Week 4); Al-Orobah 21-1 Petra (Week 6)
- Biggest away win: Petra 0-24 Shafa Badran (Week 3)
- All statistics correct as of 15 September 2026.

The 2026 Jordan Women's First Division League was the 10th season of the Jordan Women's First Division League, the second level women's football league in Jordan.

The league started on 1 August 2025 and concluded on 15 September 2026. Shafa Badran were proclaimed as winners of the competition on the final matchday, promoting them to the 2027–28 Jordan Women's Pro League.

== Format ==
The competition followed a one-stage league format, where the team with the highest points at the end were crowned as champions, gaining direct promotion to the Jordan Women's Pro League for the following season.

== Teams ==
8 teams contested the Women's First Division League Season, down from 9 the previous season. Al-Hussein opted not to participate, after withdrawing from the previous Jordan Women's Pro League season.

Locations of the 2026 Jordan Women's First Division League teams

Team	Location	Ground	Capacity	2024 Season
Ajloun	Ajloun	Polo Stadium	2,000	8th
Al-Ahli	Amman	Polo Stadium	2,000	2nd
Al-Orobah	Al-Karak	Polo Stadium	2,000	4th
Al-Raya	Zarqa	Polo Stadium	2,000	6th
Doqara	Duwaqarah, Irbid	Polo Stadium	2,000	9th
Petra	Russeifa	Polo Stadium	2,000	5th
Shabab Bushra	Bushra	Polo Stadium	2,000	7th
Shafa Badran	Shafa Badran, Amman	Polo Stadium	2,000	3rd

== League table ==
Pos	Team	Pld	W	D	L	GF	GA	GD	Pts	Promotion or relegation
1	Shafa Badran (C, P)	7	6	1	0	83	1	+82	19	2027–28 Jordan Women's Pro League
2	Al-Ahli	7	6	1	0	68	2	+66	19	
3	Al-Orobah	7	5	0	2	69	9	+60	15	
4	Shabab Bushra	7	4	0	3	24	29	−5	12	
5	Al-Raya	7	3	0	4	21	51	−30	9	
6	Doqara	7	2	0	5	21	51	−30	6	
7	Petra	7	1	0	6	14	85	−71	3	
8	Ajloun	7	0	0	7	2	74	−72	0	

Rules for classification: 1) points; 2) goal difference; 3) number of goals scored.
(C) Champions; (P) Promoted
