= Jordanian football league system =

Structure of the football league system in Jordan

- Country: Jordan
- Sport: Association football
- Promotion and relegation: Yes

National system
- Federation: Jordan Football Association
- Confederation: AFC
- Top division: Jordanian Pro League (men); Jordan Women's Pro League (women)
- Second division: Jordanian First Division League (men); Jordan Women's First Division League (women)
- Cup competition: FA Cup; FA Shield; Super Cup (men); Women's Jordan Cup (women)

This is the setup of the association football league system in Jordan.

The tables below show the makeup of the system. The Jordanian Pro League sits at the top of the pyramid and two teams get promoted/relegated between the Pro League and the First Division League. The Jordanian First Division League is the second tier of the league system, below there are the Jordanian Second and Third Division Leagues.

The football league system has changed as of the 2025-26 season.

== Men's ==
As of the 2026-27 season

Level	League(s)/division(s)
	Professional League
1	Jordanian Pro League; 10 clubs in one national division
	↓↑ 2 teams
2	Jordanian First Division League; 12 clubs in one national division
	↓↑ 2 teams
	Professional and Semi Professional League
3	Jordanian Second Division League; 14 clubs divided into 2 groups.
	↓ 4 teams

As of the 2025-26 season

Level	League(s)/division(s)											
	↑ 4 teams											
	Semi Professional League											
4	Jordanian Third Division League; 52 clubs divided into 12 groups											
4	Group 1; 4 clubs	Group 2; 4 clubs	Group 3; 4 clubs	Group 4; 4 clubs	Group 5; 5 clubs	Group 6; 4 clubs	Group 7; 4 clubs	Group 8; 4 clubs	Group 9; 4 clubs	Group 10; 6 clubs	Group 11; 4 clubs	Group 12; 5 clubs

== Women's ==
As of the 2026 season

Level	League(s)/division(s)
	Professional League
1	Jordan Women's Pro League; 6 clubs in one national division
	↓↑ 1 team
2	Jordan Women's First Division League; 8 clubs in one national division

== See also ==
- Jordan Football Association
- List of football clubs in Jordan
- Football in Jordan
