= 2023 Jordan Women's First Division League =

Jordan Women's First Division League
- Season: 2023
- Dates: 13 October 2023 – 27 November 2023
- Champions: Al-Hussein (2nd title)
- Promoted: Al-Hussein
- Matches: 72
- Goals: 238 (3.31 per match)
- Biggest home win: Al-Hussein 18-0 Petra (Week 7)
- Biggest away win: Al-Raya 0-22 Al-Hussein (Week 9)
- Highest scoring: Al-Raya 0-22 Al-Hussein (Week 9)
- Longest winning run: 8 matches Al-Hussein
- Longest unbeaten run: 8 matches Al-Hussein
- Longest winless run: 8 matches Ajloun
- Longest losing run: 8 matches Ajloun
- All statistics correct as of 27 November 2023.

The 2023 Jordan Women's First Division League was the 7th season of the Jordan Women's First Division League, the second level women's football league in Jordan.

The league started on 13 October 2023 and concluded on 27 November 2023, to which Al-Hussein were crowned champions and gained promotion to the following 2024 Jordan Women's Pro League.

== Teams ==
9 teams are contesting. 6 from the previous season, as well as the additions of Al-Hussein, Doqara and Al-Ahli.

Locations of the 2023 Jordan Women's First Division League teams

Team	Location	Ground	Capacity	2022 Season
Ajloun	Ajloun	Polo Stadium	2,000	N/A
Al-Ahli	Amman	Polo Stadium	2,000	N/A
Al-Hussein	Irbid	Polo Stadium	2,000	N/A
Al-Orobah	Al-Karak	Polo Stadium	2,000	N/A
Al-Raya	Zarqa	Polo Stadium	2,000	6th
Doqara	Duwaqarah, Irbid	Polo Stadium	2,000	N/A
Petra	Russeifa	Polo Stadium	2,000	4th
Shabab Bushra	Bushra	Polo Stadium	2,000	5th
Shafa Badran	Shafa Badran, Amman	Polo Stadium	2,000	3rd

== League table ==
Pos	Team	Pld	W	D	L	GF	GA	GD	Pts	Promotion or relegation
1	Al-Hussein (C, P)	8	8	0	0	79	1	+78	24	2024 Jordan Women's Pro League
2	Al-Ahli	8	6	1	1	28	7	+21	19	
3	Al-Orobah	8	6	0	2	37	9	+28	18	
4	Shafa Badran	8	4	0	4	18	12	+6	12	
5	Doqara	8	4	0	4	37	17	+20	12	
6	Al-Raya	8	3	1	4	15	43	−28	10	
7	Shabab Bushra	8	2	1	5	9	42	−33	7	
8	Petra	8	1	1	6	8	41	−33	4	
9	Ajloun	8	0	0	8	7	66	−59	0	

Rules for classification: 1) points; 2) goal difference; 3) number of goals scored.
(C) Champions; (P) Promoted
