= 2024 Jordan Women's First Division League =

Jordan Women's First Division League
- Season: 2024
- Dates: 11 October 2024 – 9 December 2024
- Champions: Nashama Al-Mustaqbal (1st title)
- Promoted: Nashama Al-Mustaqbal
- Matches: 36
- Goals: 310 (8.61 per match)
- Top goalscorer: Rama Al-Jaraissa (Nashama Al-Mustaqbal)
- Biggest home win: Nashama Al-Mustaqbal 26-0 Al-Raya (Week 6)
- Biggest away win: Al-Raya 0-25 Al-Orobah (Week 8)
- Highest scoring: Nashama Al-Mustaqbal 26-0 Al-Raya (Week 6)
- All statistics correct as of 9 December 2024.

The 2024 Jordan Women's First Division League was the 8th season of the Jordan Women's First Division League, the second level women's football league in Jordan.

The league started on 11 October 2024 and concluded on 9 December 2024, to which Nashama Al-Mustaqbal were crowned champions and gained promotion to the following 2025–26 Jordan Women's Pro League.

== Format ==
The competition followed a one-stage league format, where the team with the highest points at the end would get crowned as champions and would gain direct promotion to the Jordan Women's Pro League for the following season.

== Teams ==
9 teams contested the Women's First Division League Season. 8 from the previous season, as well as the addition of Nashama Al-Mustaqbal.

Locations of the 2024 Jordan Women's First Division League teams

Team	Location	Ground	Capacity	2023 Season
Ajloun	Ajloun	Polo Stadium	2,000	9th
Al-Ahli	Amman	Polo Stadium	2,000	2nd
Al-Orobah	Al-Karak	Polo Stadium	2,000	3rd
Al-Raya	Zarqa	Polo Stadium	2,000	6th
Doqara	Duwaqarah, Irbid	Polo Stadium	2,000	5th
Nashama Al-Mustaqbal	Amman	Polo Stadium	2,000	N/A
Petra	Russeifa	Polo Stadium	2,000	8th
Shabab Bushra	Bushra	Polo Stadium	2,000	7th
Shafa Badran	Shafa Badran, Amman	Polo Stadium	2,000	4th

== League table ==
Pos	Team	Pld	W	D	L	GF	GA	GD	Pts	Promotion or relegation
1	Nashama Al-Mustaqbal (C, P)	8	8	0	0	66	4	+62	24	2025–26 Jordan Women's Pro League
2	Al-Orobah	8	6	1	1	44	5	+39	19	
3	Al-Ahli	8	5	1	2	59	9	+50	16	
4	Shafa Badran	8	4	2	2	43	9	+34	14	
5	Petra	8	4	1	3	53	13	+40	13	
6	Shabab Bushra	8	3	1	4	25	22	+3	10	
7	Doqara	8	2	0	6	9	55	−46	6	
8	Ajloun	8	1	0	7	9	55	−46	3	
9	Al-Raya	8	0	0	8	2	138	−136	0	

Rules for classification: 1) points; 2) goal difference; 3) number of goals scored.
(C) Champions; (P) Promoted

== Statistics ==
=== Top goalscorers ===
As of 9 December 2024

Rank	Player	Team	Goals
1	(Jordan) Rama Al-Jaraissa	Nashama Al-Mustaqbal	18
2	(Jordan) Majd Rasras	Shafa Badran	17
2	(Jordan) Faten Al-Hamayda	Al-Orobah	17
4	(Jordan) Yaffa Jubran	Al-Ahli	13
5	(Jordan) Farah Shaheen	Shafa Badran	10
5	(Jordan) Sofia Abu Ras	Al-Ahli	10
7	(Jordan) Bisaan Jubran	Al-Ahli	8
7	(Jordan) Jawahir Na'amina	Shabab Bushra	8
