= Nashama Al-Mustaqbal SC (women) =

Jordanian association football club from Amman

Nashama Al-Mustaqbal
- Full name: Nashama Al-Mustaqbal Sports Club and Academy
- Founded: 2017; 9 years ago
- Ground: Polo Stadium
- Capacity: 2,000
- League: Jordan Women's Pro League
- 2024: Jordan Women's First Division League, 1st of 9 (promoted)
- Website: Official website

Nashama Al-Mustaqbal Sports Club and Academy (Arabic: نادي وأكاديمية نشامى المستقبل), in English translated to Chivalries of the Future, is a Jordanian women's football club based in Amman, Jordan. It currently competes in the Jordan Women's Pro League, the top tier of Jordanian football.

== History ==
Nashama Al-Mustaqbal was founded in 2016 with an initial focus on youth football in Jordan launching their professional football team a year later in 2017.

The club participated in the 2024 Jordan Women's First Division League, which the club proceeded to win the league and gain promotion to the following 2025–26 Jordan Women's Pro League season.

== Current squad ==
As of 9 December 2024

Note: Flags indicate national team as defined under FIFA eligibility rules; some limited exceptions apply. Players may hold more than one non-FIFA nationality.

| No. | Pos. | Nation | Player |
|---|---|---|---|
| 1 | GK | JOR | Elissa Tarawneh |
| 8 | | PLE | Malak Barakat |
| 99 | | PLE | Mawadda Donbok |
| — | | JOR | Batool Abu Rumman |
| — | | JOR | Tala Ghawanmeh |
| — | | JOR | Julia Dahdah |
| — | | JOR | Rama Jarayseh |
| — | | JOR | Ruba Al-Shalabi |
| — | | JOR | Sara Aqrabawi |
| — | | JOR | Sadeel Al-Eqaria |
| — | | JOR | Farah Omar |

| No. | Pos. | Nation | Player |
|---|---|---|---|
| — | | JOR | Layan Abu Saleh |
| — | | JOR | Magdalena Al-Ghussein |
| — | | JOR | Anoud Jarayseh |
| — | | JOR | Mayar Musa |
| — | | JOR | Mira Ayyad |
| — | | JOR | Minas Al-Attar |
| — | | JOR | Nima Al-Taweel |
| — | DF | JOR | Sharlot Abyad |
| — | GK | PLE | Mirave Marouf |
| — | | PLE | Rand Halawani |
| 70 | MF | IND | Ruchi Yadav |

== Personnel ==
=== Staff ===
| Position | Name |
|---|---|
| President | Zuhair Arabiyat |
| Vice President | Hussam Arabiyat |
| Financial Director | Mohammed Awadallah |
| Public Relations Officer | Rami AlShaikh |
| Administrative/Coordinator | Nevin Hisham Al-Bayed |
| Director of Coaching | Muhammad Adam |
| Head Coach | Mohammed Arabiyat |
| Health Coordinator | Abdallah Lalo |
| Team Administrator | Mohammad Abdullah |
