= Al-Hussein SC (Irbid, women) =

Jordanian women's football club from Irbid

Al-Hussein
- Full name: Al-Hussein Sport Club of Irbid
- Nicknames: غزاة الشمال (Invaders of the North)
- Founded: 2016; 10 years ago
- Ground: Al-Hassan Stadium; Polo Stadium
- Capacity: 12,000; 2,000
- Chairman: Amer Abu Obeid
- League: Jordan Women's Pro League
- 2024: Jordan Women's Pro League, 5th of 6
- Website: http://www.alhusseinsc.com/
Home colours	Away colours

The previous logo of Al-Hussein SC (Irbid)

Al-Hussein Sport Club (Arabic: نادي الحسين الرياضي) is a Jordanian professional women's football club based in Irbid, Jordan. It is the women's branch of Al-Hussein and currently competes in the Jordan Women's Pro League, the top tier of Jordanian football.

The club recently gained promotion to the 2024 Jordan Women's Pro League, after winning the 2023 Jordan Women's First Division League the previous season.

== History ==
Al-Hussein women's branch was launched during the 2016-17 Orange Women's League Championship season. They proceeded to finish bottom of the table that season, with no wins and a -100 goal differential. Honorary President of the club and businessman Nour Al-Din Al-Mahamid stated how the club needed a complete restructure, which includes the women's branch. The 2016 FIFA U-17 Women's World Cup, which was hosted in Jordan, benefited the club greatly, as it was able to help fix its infrastructures.

In 2020, Al-Hussein's U16 team aspired to win their youth league, to which they were controversially eliminated in the semi-finals of the competition to Shabab Al-Ordon, after finishing in first place during the regular season.

On 27 November 2023, Al-Hussein were crowned as champions of the 2023 Jordan Women's First Division League, thereby promoting them to the Jordan Women's Pro League.

Al-Hussein then competed in the 2024 season. On 5 August 2024, Al-Hussein players stopped their training due to delayed payments of salaries from the previous month. Observers believed that the Jordan Football Association delayed handing over the dues to the clubs, thanks to a football team taking part in a training camp in Turkey the previous month. On 11 September 2024, Al-Hussein saw an 8–0 loss to eventual league champions Etihad.

== Current squad ==
As of 18 September 2024

Note: Flags indicate national team as defined under FIFA eligibility rules; some limited exceptions apply. Players may hold more than one non-FIFA nationality.

No.	Pos.	Nation	Player
—		JOR	Aseel Al-Khawaja
—		JOR	Tasnim Al-Badawi
—		JOR	Tuleen Shwayyat
—	GK	JOR	Diana Al-Joulani
—		JOR	Rania Salama
—		JOR	Rahma Abzakh
—		JOR	Rahaf Al-Rashidat
—		JOR	Zainab Obiedat
—		JOR	Sahar Sa'ed
—		JOR	Charlotte Al-Abyad

No.	Pos.	Nation	Player
—		JOR	Aziza Hayek
—		JOR	Farah Al-Aidah
—		JOR	Fairouz Ehab
—	GK	JOR	Lujain Alaidi
—		JOR	Layan Al-Momani
—		JOR	Leen Al-Momani
—		JOR	Marwa Matalqa
—		JOR	Malak Al-Rashdiat
—		JOR	Malak Mousa
—		JOR	Youmna Abu Dhiab
