= List of Saudi Arabia women's international footballers =

This is a list of Saudi Arabia women's international footballers – association football players who have appeared at least once for the senior Saudi Arabia women's national football team.

== Players ==
Key
**Bold**	Named to the national team in the past year

As of match played 23 February 2024

Saudi Arabia women's national team footballers
Name	Caps	Goals	Date of debut	Debut against	Date of final match	Final match against	Ref.
Lana Abdulrazak	22	2	20 February 2022	Seychelles	23 February 2024	Guam	
Sara Al-Hamad	22	0	20 February 2022	Seychelles	23 February 2024	Guam	
Bayan Sadagah	22	1	20 February 2022	Seychelles	23 February 2024	Guam	
Raghad Mukhayzin	21	0	20 February 2022	Seychelles	23 February 2024	Guam	
Joury Tarek	17	0	20 February 2022	Seychelles	21 February 2024	Lebanon	
Noura Ibrahim	17	3	20 February 2022	Seychelles	23 February 2024	Guam	
Al Bandari Mobarak	17	10	20 February 2022	Seychelles	23 February 2024	Guam	
Talah Al-Ghamdi	16	0	20 February 2022	Seychelles	23 February 2024	Guam	
Leen Mohammed	15	2	20 February 2022	Seychelles	23 February 2024	Guam	
Fatimah Mansour	15	0	11 January 2023	Mauritius	23 February 2024	Guam	
Sara Khalid	14	0	20 February 2022	Seychelles	23 February 2024	Guam	
Mubarkh Al-Saiari	13	0	15 January 2023	Comoros	23 February 2024	Guam	
Seba Tawfiq	12	2	24 September 2022	Bhutan	23 February 2024	Guam	
Al Bandari Al-Hwsawi	11	1	20 February 2022	Seychelles	8 January 2024	Syria	
Al-Adda Fahad	10	0	24 September 2022	Bhutan	23 February 2024	Guam	
Mariam Al-Tamimi	8	2	20 February 2022	Seychelles	26 February 2023	Indonesia	
Huriyyah Al-Shamrani	8	0	22 February 2023	Indonesia	12 January 2024	Syria	
Mona Abdulrahman	8	0	24 February 2022	Maldives	21 February 2024	Lebanon	
Shuruq Al-Hwsawi	8	0	13 June 2023	Andorra	21 February 2024	Lebanon	
Layan Jouhari	7	0	20 February 2022	Seychelles	30 September 2023	Malaysia	
Daliah Abu Laban	6	1	20 February 2022	Seychelles	24 September 2023	Pakistan	
Dalal Abdulateef	6	0	11 January 2023	Mauritius	27 September 2023	Bhutan	
Ameera Abu Al-Samh	6	0	13 June 2023	Andorra	30 September 2023	Malaysia	
Moudhi Abdulmohsen	5	0	22 February 2023	Indonesia	21 February 2024	Lebanon	
Nouf Saud	4	0	12 January 2024	Syria	23 February 2024	Guam	
Raghad Helmi	3	0	24 September 2022	Bhutan	19 January 2023	Pakistan	
Tahani Al Zahrani	3	0	24 February 2022	Maldives	27 September 2023	Bhutan	
Hala Khashoggi	3	0	19 February 2024	Jordan	23 February 2024	Guam	
Fadwa Khaled	2	0	11 January 2023	Mauritius	27 September 2023	Bhutan	
Abeer Nasser	2	0	30 September 2023	Malaysia	12 January 2024	Syria	
Al Jawharah Saud	2	0	8 January 2024	Syria	12 January 2024	Syria	
Moluk Al-Hawsawi	2	0	8 January 2024	Syria	21 February 2024	Lebanon	
Hissah Al Saadallah	1	0	20 February 2022	Seychelles	20 February 2022	Seychelles	
Asrar Al Shaibani	1	0	20 February 2022	Seychelles	20 February 2022	Seychelles	
Farah Jefry	1	0	24 February 2022	Maldives	24 February 2022	Maldives	
Atheer Khalid	1	0	24 February 2022	Maldives	24 February 2022	Maldives	
Taqiah Rashwan	1	0	28 September 2022	Bhutan	28 September 2022	Bhutan	
Laila Al-Qahtani	1	0	11 January 2023	Mauritius	11 January 2023	Mauritius	
Aseel Saleh	1	0	11 January 2023	Mauritius	11 January 2023	Mauritius	
Majd Al-Otaibi	1	0	19 January 2023	Pakistan	19 January 2023	Pakistan	
Reema Al-Thakafi	1	0	7 May 2023	Palestine	7 May 2023	Palestine	
Rahaf Al-Mansouri	1	0	18 September 2023	Malaysia	18 September 2023	Malaysia	
Aseel Ahmed	1	0	12 January 2024	Syria	12 January 2024	Syria	
Haya Al-Sunaidi	1	0	23 February 2024	Guam	23 February 2024	Guam	

== See also ==
- List of Saudi Arabia international footballers
- Saudi Arabia women's national football team results
