= Saudi Arabia women's national football team results =

This article summarises the outcomes of all matches including FIFA recognised, unofficial and matches played against club teams by the Saudi Arabia women's national football team, since they first played in 2022.

== Results by year ==
As of 13 October 2026 after the match against Malaysia.

Year	M	W	D	L	GF	GA	GD
2022	4	2	1	1	9	7	+2
2023	13	3	5	5	8	12	–4
2024	12	4	2	6	15	12	+3
2025	15	8	2	5	27	12	+15
2026	11	7	1	3	25	7	+18
Total	55	24	11	20	84	50	+34

== Results ==
Key
Win
Draw
Defeat

=== 2022 ===
20 February 2022 Friendly	Saudi Arabia	2–0	Seychelles	Malé, Maldives
17:00	Mobarak 14'; Al-Tamimi 49' (pen.)	Report (GSA)		Stadium: Galolhu Rasmee Dhandu Stadium; Referee: Adam Fazeel (Maldives)

24 February 2022 Friendly	Maldives	0–2	Saudi Arabia	Malé, Maldives
17:00		Report (GSA)	Mobarak 62', 82'	Stadium: Galolhu Rasmee Dhandu Stadium; Referee: Javiz Mohamed (Maldives)

24 September 2022 Friendly	Saudi Arabia	3–3	Bhutan	Abha, Saudi Arabia
	Sadagah 15'; Mobarak 75'; Ibrahim 90'	Report	Choden Tshering 5'; Yangdon 40'; Choden 42'	Stadium: Prince Sultan bin Abdul Aziz Stadium; Referee: Pansa Chaisanit (Thailand)

28 September 2022 Friendly	Saudi Arabia	2–4	Bhutan	Abha, Saudi Arabia
	Al-Tamimi 53' (pen.); Mobarak 72'	Report	Choden Tshering 22', 30', 59'; Yangdon 68'	Stadium: Prince Sultan bin Abdul Aziz Stadium

=== 2023 ===
11 January 2023 2023 SAFF Women's Friendly Tournament	Saudi Arabia	1–0	Mauritius	Khobar, Saudi Arabia
20:30 UTC+3	Al-Tamimi 44' (pen.)	Report		Stadium: Prince Saud bin Jalawi Stadium; Referee: Shahenda Saad Ali ElMaghrabi (Egypt)

15 January 2023 2023 SAFF Women's Friendly Tournament	Comoros	0–2	Saudi Arabia	Khobar, Saudi Arabia
20:30 UTC+3		Report	Ibrahim 35'; Abu Laban 90+1'	Stadium: Prince Saud bin Jalawi Stadium; Referee: Shahenda Saad Ali ElMaghrabi (Egypt)

19 January 2023 2023 SAFF Women's Friendly Tournament	Saudi Arabia	1–1	Pakistan	Khobar, Saudi Arabia
20:30 UTC+3	Mobarak 28'	Report	M. Khan 64'	Stadium: Prince Saud bin Jalawi Stadium

22 February 2023 Friendly	Saudi Arabia	1–1	Indonesia	Dammam, Saudi Arabia
18:00 UTC+3	Abdulrazak 85'	Report	Baiq 8'	Stadium: Prince Mohamed bin Fahd Stadium; Referee: Veronika Bernatskaia (Kyrgyzstan)

26 February 2023 Friendly	Saudi Arabia	0–1	Indonesia	Dammam, Saudi Arabia
18:00 UTC+3		Report	Baiq 18'	Stadium: Prince Mohamed bin Fahd Stadium

7 May 2023 Friendly	Saudi Arabia	0–0	Palestine	Jeddah, Saudi Arabia
19:00 UTC+3				Stadium: Sports Hall at King Abdullah Sports City

11 May 2023 Friendly	Saudi Arabia	1–1	Palestine	Jeddah, Saudi Arabia
19:00 UTC+3	Leen 18'		Miral 69'	Stadium: Prince Abdullah Al Faisal Stadium

13 June 2023 Friendly	Andorra	3–1	Saudi Arabia	Girona, Spain
	Gonçalves 6'; Ruzafa 19'; Morato 45'		Ibrahim 25'	Stadium: Estadi Municipal De Peralada

17 June 2023 Friendly	Andorra	3–0	Saudi Arabia	Girona, Spain
	Morato 21', 72'; Ruzafa 90'			Stadium: Estadi Municipal De Peralada

18 September 2023 2023 SAFF Women's Friendly Tournament	Saudi Arabia	0–0	Malaysia	Taif, Saudi Arabia
20:30 UTC+3				Stadium: King Fahd Sports City

24 September 2023 2023 SAFF Women's Friendly Tournament	Pakistan	0–1	Saudi Arabia	Taif, Saudi Arabia
20:30 UTC+3		Report	B. Al-Hwsawi 90+5'	Stadium: King Fahd Sports City

27 September 2023 2023 SAFF Women's Friendly Tournament	Saudi Arabia	0–1 (a.e.t.)	Bhutan	Taif, Saudi Arabia
20:30 UTC+3			Bidha 112'	Stadium: King Fahd Sports City; Referee: Nodira Mirzoeva (Tajikistan)

30 September 2023 2023 SAFF Women's Friendly Tournament	Saudi Arabia	0–1	Malaysia	Taif, Saudi Arabia
17:30 UTC+3			Sarge 45+4'	Stadium: King Fahd Sports City

=== 2024 ===
8 January 2024 Friendly	Saudi Arabia	2–0	Syria	Jeddah, Saudi Arabia
18:00 UTC+3	Tawfiq 8'; Mobarak 55'	Report		Stadium: King Abdullah Sports City

12 January 2024 Friendly	Saudi Arabia	3–0	Syria	Jeddah, Saudi Arabia
18:00 UTC+3	N. Saud (yellow card) 43'; Mobarak 45+1', 76', 82'	Report	R. Ibrahim (yellow card) 63'	Referee: Doumouh Al Bakkar (Lebanon)

19 February 2024 2024 WAFF Women's Championship	Saudi Arabia	1–3	Jordan	Jeddah, Saudi Arabia
20:00 UTC+3	Mohammed 33'	Report	Sweilem 25'; Jbarah 62'; Al-Majali 72' (pen.)	Stadium: King Abdullah Sports City; Referee: Mohamed Juma (Bahrain)

21 February 2024 2024 WAFF Women's Championship	Lebanon	3–2	Saudi Arabia	Jeddah, Saudi Arabia
20:00 UTC+3	Maalouf 3'; Saud 7' (o.g.); Salha 38' (pen.)	Report	Abdulrazak 64'; Tawfiq 81'	Stadium: King Abdullah Sports City Reserve Stadium; Referee: Ahmed Gatea (Iraq)

23 February 2024 2024 WAFF Women's Championship	Saudi Arabia	0–2	Guam	Jeddah, Saudi Arabia
20:00 UTC+3		Report	Anaya 21', 42'	Stadium: King Abdullah Sports City Reserve Stadium; Referee: Alesar Baddour (Syria)

7 August 2024 Friendly	Saudi Arabia	0–1	Moldova	Ostrava-Vítkovice, Czechia
17:30 UTC+2		Report (FMF)	Său 54'	Stadium: Městský stadion

11 August 2024 Friendly	Saudi Arabia	0–1	Moldova	Kirchberg am Wagram, Austria
20:00 UTC+2		Report (FMF)	Sivolobova 22' (pen.)	Stadium: Sportpark Kirchberg/Wagram

23 October 2024 Friendly	Saudi Arabia	0–0	Malaysia	Dubai, United Arab Emirates
--:-- UTC+3				Stadium: Police Officers' Club Stadium

29 October 2024 Friendly	Saudi Arabia	4–0	Laos	Dubai, United Arab Emirates
19:00 UTC+3	Tawfiq 51'; Mobarak 53', 70'; Abdulmohsen 84'			Stadium: Police Officers' Club Stadium

29 November 2024 Friendly	Saudi Arabia	0–1	Palestine	Doha, Qatar
19:00 UTC+3			Youssef 66'	Stadium: Aspire Academy Stadium; Referee: Khalid Al-Shaqsi (Oman)

3 December 2024 Friendly	Saudi Arabia	2–0	Palestine	Doha, Qatar
19:00 UTC+3	Tawfiq 39'; Fahad 66'	Report		Stadium: Aspire Academy Stadium; Referee: Khalid Al-Shaqsi (Oman)

7 December 2024 Friendly	Saudi Arabia	1–1	Pakistan	Doha, Qatar
19:00 UTC+3	Al-Ghamdi 37'	Report	Hirani 87'	Stadium: Aspire Academy Stadium; Referee: Khalid Al-Shaqsi (Oman)

=== 2025 ===
20 February 2025 Friendly	Saudi Arabia	0–1	Indonesia	Jeddah, Saudi Arabia
19:30 UTC+3		Report	Reva O. 31' (pen.)	Stadium: King Abdullah Sports City; Referee: Mohammed Al-Manii (Oman)

23 February 2025 Friendly	Saudi Arabia	4–0	Tajikistan	Jeddah, Saudi Arabia
19:30 UTC+3	Tawfiq 2', 36'; Mobarak 55'; Mukhayzin 83' (pen.)	Report		Stadium: King Abdullah Sports City; Player of the Match: Seba Tawfiq

26 February 2025 Friendly	Saudi Arabia	3–0	Tajikistan	Jeddah, Saudi Arabia
19:30 UTC+3	Tawfiq 16'; Abu Al-Samh 50'; Mobarak 67'	Report		Stadium: King Abdullah Sports City; Player of the Match: Lana Abdulrazak

5 April 2025 Friendly	Saudi Arabia	2–0	Sri Lanka	Khobar, Saudi Arabia
18:30 UTC+3	Mukhayzin 19' (pen.); Belal 30'	Report		Stadium: Prince Saud Bin Jalawi Stadium

8 April 2025 Friendly	Saudi Arabia	1–2	Hong Kong	Khobar, Saudi Arabia
18:30 UTC+3	Mukhayzin 90+1'		Ko Pak Ling Lucia 76'; Chan Yee Hing 80'	Stadium: Prince Saud Bin Jalawi Stadium

12 June 2025 Friendly	Saudi Arabia	1–0	Bahrain	Taif, Saudi Arabia
10:00 UTC+3	Tawfiq 89'			Stadium: King Fahd Sports City Stadium

29 June 2025 2026 AFC Women's Asian Cup qualification	Philippines	3–0	Saudi Arabia	Phnom Penh, Cambodia
16:00 UTC+7	Sawicki 16'; Serrano 55'; Pino 81'	Report		Stadium: National Olympic Stadium; Referee: Sunita Thongthawin (Thailand)

2 July 2025 2026 AFC Women's Asian Cup qualification	Saudi Arabia	0–1	Hong Kong	Phnom Penh, Cambodia
16:00 UTC+7		Report	Tsang L.M. 62'	Stadium: National Olympic Stadium; Referee: Nodira Mirzoeva (Tajikistan)

5 July 2025 2026 AFC Women's Asian Cup qualification	Cambodia	2–1	Saudi Arabia	Phnom Penh, Cambodia
19:00 UTC+7	Sovanmony 84'; Serysitha 90+5'	Report	Al-Angari 79'	Stadium: National Olympic Stadium; Referee: Veronika Bernatskaia (Kyrgyzstan)

25 October 2025 Friendly	Singapore	0–1	Saudi Arabia	Abu Dhabi, United Arab Emirates
19:00 UTC+3			Mobarak 80'	Stadium: 321 Sports Stadium

29 October 2025 Friendly	Singapore	0–5	Saudi Arabia	Abu Dhabi, United Arab Emirates
19:00 UTC+3			Mukhayzin 22' (pen.); Mansour 56'; Al-Enezi 59'; Abdulrazak 82' (pen.); Ibrahim 84'	Stadium: 321 Sports Stadium

24 November 2025 2025 WAFF Championship GS	Iraq	1–2	Saudi Arabia	Jeddah, Saudi Arabia
19:45 UTC+3	Al-Jawahiri 90+7'	Report	Mukhayzin 41' (pen.); Abu Al-Samh 90+5'	Stadium: Hall Stadium – King Abdullah Sports City; Referee: Esraa Al-Mbaiden (Jordan)

28 November 2025 2025 WAFF Championship GS	Saudi Arabia	5–0	United Arab Emirates	Jeddah, Saudi Arabia
19:45 UTC+3	Abdullah 3', 10'; Abdulrazak 26'; Khalid 28'; Abu Al-Samh 43'	Report		Stadium: Hall Stadium – King Abdullah Sports City; Referee: Mohammed Al-Manii (Oman)

30 November 2025 2025 WAFF Championship SF	Saudi Arabia	0–0 (3–4 p)	Palestine	Jeddah, Saudi Arabia
19:45 UTC+3		Report		Stadium: Hall Stadium – King Abdullah Sports City; Attendance: 610; Referee: Said Al-Mezeini (Oman)
	Penalties
	Mukhayzin (penalty scored); Abdulrazak (penalty scored); Ibrahim (penalty missed); Tawfiq (penalty missed); Al-Omaysi (penalty scored)		(penalty scored) Youssef; (penalty scored) Asad-Halim; (penalty missed) Osorio; (penalty scored) Sabat; (penalty scored) Nasr

2 December 2025 2025 WAFF Championship 3rd	Saudi Arabia	2–2 (2–4 p)	Iraq	Jeddah, Saudi Arabia
16:45 UTC+3	Abdullah 17'; Abdulrazak 62'	Report	Salihi 41'; Al-Balahi 53'	Stadium: Al-Faisal Stadium; Referee: Mohammed Al-Manii (Oman)
	Penalties
	Mukhayzin (penalty missed); Abdulrazak (penalty scored); Hanafi (penalty missed); Tawfiq (penalty scored)		(penalty scored) Al-Ghazawi; (penalty scored) Al-Balahi; (penalty scored) Abuzer; (penalty scored) Al-Jawahiri

=== 2026 ===
26 February 2026 Friendly	Bahrain	0–3	Saudi Arabia	Manama, Bahrain
21:00 UTC+3		Report	Tawfiq 55'; Khalid 57'; Al-Omaysi 79'	Stadium: Al Ahli Stadium

2 March 2026 Friendly	Saudi Arabia	2–0	Kyrgyzstan	Khobar, Saudi Arabia
22:00 UTC+3	Mukhayzin 8'; Khalid 35'	Report		Stadium: Prince Saud bin Jalawi Sports City Stadium

6 March 2026 Friendly	Saudi Arabia	3–0	Kyrgyzstan	Khobar, Saudi Arabia
22:00 UTC+3	Abdullah 22', 28', 53'	Report		Stadium: Prince Saud bin Jalawi Sports City Stadium

10 April 2026 Friendly	Saudi Arabia	1–1	Botswana	Abha, Saudi Arabia
19:00 UTC+3	Tawfiq 90+5'	Report	Moloi 28'	Stadium: Prince Sultan bin Abdulaziz Sports City Stadium; Referee: Husain Al-Showaikh (Bahrain)

14 April 2026 Friendly	Saudi Arabia	1–2	Egypt	Abha, Saudi Arabia
19:00 UTC+3	Abdullah 38'	Report	Ghazi 59'; El Sayed 73'; El Mitwalli (yellow card) (yellow-red card) 90+7'	Stadium: Prince Sultan bin Abdulaziz Sports City Stadium; Referee: Husain Al-Showaikh (Bahrain); Assistant referees: Ahmed Al-Ghareeb (Bahrain); Husain Jaafar (Bahrain); Fourth official: Kalthoum Hantoul (Saudi Arabia)

18 April 2026 Friendly	Saudi Arabia	0–2	Egypt	Abha, Saudi Arabia
19:00 UTC+3			Ghazi 45+2' (pen.); El Sayed 90+4'	Referee: Mohammed Al-Manii (Oman)

7 June 2026 Friendly	Saudi Arabia	4–0	Sri Lanka	Bangkok, Thailand
19:00 UTC+7	Abdullah 24', 37'; Abu-Alsamh 26', 27'			Stadium: Windmill Football Club Stadium

10 June 2026 Friendly	Saudi Arabia	4–0	Laos	Bangkok, Thailand
19:00 UTC+7	Al-Yahya 6'; Al-Omaysi 45+2', 70'; Abdullah 52'	Report		Stadium: Windmill Football Club Stadium; Referee: Supiree Testhomya (Thailand)

13 June 2026 Friendly	Saudi Arabia	5–1	Laos	Bangkok, Thailand
19:00 UTC+7	Abdullah 15', 52', 73'; Al-Saiari 75'; Balkhudher 77'		Chanthithong 71'	Stadium: Windmill Football Club Stadium

9 October Friendly	Saudi Arabia	2–0	Malaysia	Doha, Qatar
19:00 UTC+3	Tawfiq 87'; Al-Saiari 90'	Report		Stadium: Aspire Academy Stadium

13 October Friendly	Saudi Arabia	0–1	Malaysia	Doha, Qatar
19:00 UTC+3		Report	Mahrt 5'	Stadium: Aspire Academy Stadium
