= Hessa Al-Sudairy =

Saudi footballer (born 1985)

Personal information
- Full name: Hessa Ahmed Al-Sudairy
- Date of birth: 22 March 1985 (age 41)
- Place of birth: Saudi Arabia
- Position: Goalkeeper

Team information
- Current team: Al-Ittihad
- Number: 1

Senior career*
Years	Team	Apps	(Gls)
2019–2022	Jeddah Eagles FC		
2022–	Al-Ittihad		

International career
2023–	Saudi Arabia		
- * Club domestic league appearances and goals

Hessa Ahmed Al-Sudairy (Arabic: حِصَّة أَحْمَد السُّدَيْرِيّ; born 22 March 1985) is a Saudi footballer who plays as a goalkeeper for Saudi Women's Premier League club Al-Ittihad.

== Club career ==
Al-Sudairy played with the Jeddah Eagles team, winning the regional Jeddah tournament with them.

After Al-Ittihad acquired the Jeddah Eagles team, Al-Sudairy played in the 2022–23 season of the Saudi Women’s Premier League.

In the following season 2023–24, American coach Kelly Lindsey relied on goalkeeper Al-Sudairy in the starting lineup for most of the Saudi Women’s Premier League.

== International career ==
On 18 December 2023, Finnish coach Rosa Lappi-Seppälä summoned goalkeeper Al-Sudairy to the Saudi national team, which was preparing to play in the SAFF Women's International Friendly Tournament.

== Managing career ==
In addition to continuing to play with Al-Ittihad, Al-Sudairy went through several programs to develop the coaching profession in Spain and Saudi Arabia.
