= Seba Tawfiq =

Saudi footballer (born 2005)

Personal information
- Full name: Seba Rabea Mohammed Tawfiq
- Date of birth: 13 January 2005 (age 21)
- Place of birth: Jeddah, Saudi Arabia
- Height: 1.70 m (5 ft 7 in)
- Position: Midfielder

Team information
- Current team: Al-Ittihad
- Number: 10

Senior career*
Years	Team	Apps	(Gls)
2021–2022	Jeddah Eagles		
2022–	Al-Ittihad	30	(11)

International career^{‡}
2021–	Saudi Arabia (futsal)	11	(1)
2022–	Saudi Arabia	32	(8)
- * Club domestic league appearances and goals as of 30 December 2023 ‡ National team caps and goals as of 2 December 2025

Seba Rabea Mohammed Tawfiq (Arabic: صِبَا رَبِيع مُحَمَّد تَوْفِيق; born 13 January 2005) is a Saudi professional footballer who plays as a midfielder for Saudi Women's Premier League club Al-Ittihad and the Saudi Arabia national team.

== Club career ==
Tawfiq was born in Jeddah, Saudi Arabia, left for Canada with her family at a young age. It was in there that she started her football journey, joining Toronto High Park FC. After returning from Canada, she joined the Jeddah-based team Jeddah Eagles FC in 2021, where she won the Saudi women's Regional Football League western division with the club. in September 2022, Al-Ittihad acquired Jeddah Eagles with its players and staff.

=== Al-Ittihad Club ===
On October 15, 2023, she made her debut for Al-Ittihad, scoring her first goal in the same match at the 1st minute, marking it the fastest goal of the season. At the conclusion of the 2022–23 season she secured a shared 7th position in the overall top scorer ranking and claimed the second spot among Saudi players.

In February 2023, Al-Ittihad announced the extension of Tawfiq contract until 2026.

== International career ==
=== Football ===
In February 2022, Seba aged 17 at the time got her first call-up to the inaugural Saudi Arabia women's national football team to participate in friendly matches against Maldives and Seychelles. On 24 September 2022, she made her debut for the team as a starter in their 3–3 draw against Bhutan. On 8 January 2024, Tawfiq scored her first goal for the national team in the 8th team against Syria.

=== Futsal ===
In September 2021, Seba earned her first call-up to represent the senior futsal national team, and in June 2022 she was called up to represent Saudi Arabia in 2022 WAFF Women's Futsal Championship, she was named the tournament best player.

== Career statistics ==
=== Club ===
As of match played 30 December 2023

Appearances and goals by club, season and competition
Club	Season	League			Cup		Continental		Total	
Club	Season	Division	Apps	Goals	Apps	Goals	Apps	Goals	Apps	Goals
Al-Ittihad	2022–23	SWPL	14	9	–	–	—		14	9
Al-Ittihad	2023–24	SWPL	12	2	3	1	—		15	3
Al-Ittihad	2024-25	SWPL	6	0	1	2			7	2
Al-Ittihad	Total		30	11	4	3	—		36	14
Career total			30	11	4	3	—		36	14

=== International ===
As of match played 24 February 2024

Appearances and goals by national team and year
National team	Year	Apps	Goals
Saudi Arabia	2022	2	0
Saudi Arabia	2023	5	0
Saudi Arabia	2024	5	4
Saudi Arabia	2025	3	4
Total		14	8

Scores and results list Saudi Arabia's goal tally first, score column indicates score after each Tawfiq goal.

List of international goals scored by Seba Tawfiq
No.	Date	Venue	Opponent	Score	Result	Competition
1	8 January 2024	King Abdullah Sports City, Jeddah, Saudi Arabia	Syria	1–0	2–0	Friendly
2	21 February 2024	King Abdullah Sports City Reserve Stadium, Jeddah, Saudi Arabia	Lebanon	2–3	2–3	2024 WAFF Women's Championship
3	29 October 2024	Police Officers' Club Stadium, Dubai, United Arab Emirates	Laos	1–0	4–0	Friendly
4	3 December 2024	Aspire Academy Stadium, Doha, Qatar	Palestine	1–0	2–0	Friendly
5	23 February 2025	King Abdullah Sports City, Jeddah, Saudi Arabia	Tajikistan	1–0	4–0	Friendly
6	23 February 2025	King Abdullah Sports City, Jeddah, Saudi Arabia	Tajikistan	2–0	4–0	Friendly
7	26 February 2025	King Abdullah Sports City, Jeddah, Saudi Arabia	Tajikistan	1–0	3–0	Friendly
8	12 June 2025	King Fahd Sports City, Taif, Saudi Arabia	Bahrain	1–0	1–0	Friendly
9	9 October 2026	QWSC Stadium, Doha, Qatar	Malaysia	1–0	2–0	Friendly

== Honours ==
Saudi Arabia

- SAFF Women's International Friendly Tournament winner: Khobar 2023

Saudi Arabia futsal

- WAFF Women's Futsal Championship runners-up: 2022

Individual

- WAFF Women's Futsal Championship Best Player: 2022
