= 2023 SAFF Women's International Friendly Tournament (Taif) =

Tournament details
- Host country: Saudi Arabia
- Dates: 18–30 September
- Teams: 6 (from 3 sub-confederations)
- Venue: 1 (in 1 host city)

Final positions
- Champions: Lebanon (1st title)
- Runners-up: Bhutan
- Third place: Malaysia
- Fourth place: Saudi Arabia

Tournament statistics
- Matches played: 11
- Goals scored: 16 (1.45 per match)
- Top scorer(s): (Lebanon) Lili Iskandar (3 goals)
- Best player: (Bhutan) Deki Lhazom
- Best goalkeeper: (Malaysia) Nurul Azurin Mazlan

The 2023 SAFF Women's International Friendly Tournament was the 2nd edition of the SAFF Women's International Friendly Tournament organized by the Saudi Arabian Football Federation (SAFF). Taif was selected as the host city by the SAFF Women's Football Committee in September 2023. On 21 August 2023, the SAFF confirmed that the tournament would take place between 18 and 30 September 2023.

The competition saw an expansion of participating teams from four in the first edition to six in this edition.

Saudi Arabia were the defending champions having won last edition in Khobar, but were eliminated in the semi-finals by Bhutan after extra time. Lebanon were crowned champions for the first time after defeating Bhutan 1–0, also after extra time.

== Participating teams ==
The second SAFF Women's International Friendly Tournament featured teams from six different nations, representing three Asian regional sub-confederations: WAFF (West Asia), SAFF (South Asia), and AFF (ASEAN).

=== Qualified teams ===
The following six teams participated in the tournament:

Team	Appearance	Last appearance	FIFA Ranking (Note: As published on 25 August 2023)	Previous best performance
Saudi Arabia	2nd	2023 (Khobar)	172th	Champions (2023 (Khobar))
Bhutan	1st	N/A	169th	Debut
Laos	1st	N/A	87th	Debut
Lebanon	1st	N/A	137th	Debut
Malaysia	1st	N/A	89th	Debut
Pakistan	2nd	2023 (Khobar)	157th	Runners-up (2023 (Khobar))

== Venue ==
All the matches of the tournament are being held exclusively at the King Fahd Stadium in Taif.

2023 SAFF Women's International Friendly Tournament (Taif) is located in Saudi Arabia	Taif
2023 SAFF Women's International Friendly Tournament (Taif) is located in Saudi Arabia	King Fahd Sports City
2023 SAFF Women's International Friendly Tournament (Taif) is located in Saudi Arabia	Capacity: 20,000

== Format ==
The tournament follows a group-stage format, where the six competing teams were drawn into two groups of three. The top two teams of each group advance to the semi-finals. Meanwhile, the third-placed teams from both groups play in a match to determine the 5th place. The winners of the semi-finals secure a spot in the final, while the defeated teams face off for third place.

== Group Stage ==
All times are local, SAST (UTC+03:00).

=== Group A ===
Pos	Team	Pld	W	D	L	GF	GA	GD	Pts	Qualification
1	Saudi Arabia (H)	2	1	1	0	1	0	+1	4	Knockout stage
2	Malaysia	2	0	2	0	0	0	0	2	Knockout stage
3	Pakistan	2	0	1	1	0	1	−1	1	

Source: SAFF
(H) Hosts
18 September
20:30

Saudi Arabia	0–0	Malaysia
	Report

King Fahd Sports City, Taif

21 September
20:30

Malaysia	0–0	Pakistan
	Report

King Fahd Sports City, Taif

24 September
20:30

Pakistan	0–1	Saudi Arabia
	Report	Hawsawi 90'

King Fahd Sports City, Taif

=== Group B ===
Pos	Team	Pld	W	D	L	GF	GA	GD	Pts	Qualification
1	Lebanon	2	2	0	0	7	3	+4	6	Knockout stage
2	Bhutan	2	0	1	1	2	3	−1	1	Knockout stage
3	Laos	2	0	1	1	1	4	−3	1	

Source: SAFF
18 September
17:30

Laos	1–4	Lebanon
Chinda 81'	Report	Arabi 13'; C. Iskandar 60'; Raed 65'; L. Iskandar 70'

King Fahd Sports City, Taif
Referee: Nodira Mirzoeva (Tajikistan)

21 September
17:30

Lebanon	3–2	Bhutan
L. Iskandar 30'; Salha 61'; Awad 64'	Report	Lhazom 82', 86' (pen.)

King Fahd Sports City, Taif
Referee: Shahenda El Maghrabi (Egypt)

24 September
17:30

Bhutan	0–0	Laos
	Report

King Fahd Sports City, Taif

== Placement match ==
5th place
28 September – Taif
Pakistan (p)	1 (4)
Laos	1 (2)

=== Fifth place match ===
28 September
17:30

Pakistan	1–1 (a.e.t.)	Laos
Z. Shah 58'	Report	Xayapaserd 63'
Penalties
Z. Shah (penalty missed); Hirani (penalty scored); Malik (penalty scored); Malika-e-Noor (penalty scored); M. Khan (penalty scored)	4–2	(penalty missed) Phatthalavady; (penalty scored) Kemmy; (penalty scored) Phanykone; (penalty missed) Chinda; (penalty missed) Saysamone

King Fahd Sports City, Taif
Referee: Nodira Mirzoeva (Tajikistan)

== Knockout stage ==
- In the knockout stage, extra-time and a penalty shoot-out will be used to decide the winner if necessary.

=== Bracket ===
Semi-finals
27 September – Taif
Saudi Arabia	0
Bhutan (a.e.t.)	1
27 September – Taif
Lebanon (p)	0 (4)
Malaysia	0 (3)

Final
30 September – Taif
Bhutan	0
Lebanon (a.e.t.)	1
Third Place match
30 September – Taif
Saudi Arabia	0
Malaysia	1

=== Semi-finals ===
27 September 2023
20:30

Saudi Arabia	0–1 (a.e.t.)	Bhutan
	Report	Bidha 112'

King Fahd Sports City, Taif
Referee: Nodira Mirzoeva (Tajikistan)
27 September 2023
17:30

Lebanon	0–0 (a.e.t.)	Malaysia
	Report
Penalties
L. Iskandar (penalty scored); Salha (penalty missed); Abdin (penalty scored); C. Iskandar (penalty missed); Awad (penalty missed); Arabi (penalty missed); Bou Hamra (penalty scored); Al Kasti (penalty scored)	4–3	(penalty scored) Sarge; (penalty missed) Sarah; (penalty missed) Arissa; (penalty scored) Soberi; (penalty missed) Saidin; (penalty missed) Mazlan; (penalty scored) Usman; (penalty missed) Irdina

King Fahd Sports City, Taif
Referee: Khuloud AlZaabi (United Arab Emirates)

=== Third-place match ===
30 September 2023
16:30

Saudi Arabia	0–1	Malaysia
	Report	Steffi 45'

King Fahd Sports City, Taif

=== Final ===
30 September 2023
20:30

Bhutan	0–1 (a.e.t.)	Lebanon
	Report	L. Iskandar 102'

King Fahd Sports City, Taif
Referee: Nodira Mirzoeva (Tajikistan)

== Goalscorers ==
There were 16 goals scored in 11 matches, for an average of 1.45 goals per match.

3 goals

- (Lebanon) Lili Iskandar

2 goals

- (Bhutan) Deki Lhazom

1 goal

- (Bhutan) Yesney Bidha
- (Laos) Chinda Sihalath
- (Laos) Chaikham Xayapaserd
- (Lebanon) Zahwa Arabi
- (Lebanon) Samira Awad
- (Lebanon) Cecile Iskandar
- (Lebanon) Waed Raed
- (Lebanon) Syntia Salha
- (Malaysia) Steffi Sarge Kaur
- (Pakistan) Zulfia Shah
- (Saudi Arabia) Al Bandari Hawsawi
