= Joury Tarek =

Saudi footballer

Personal information
- Full name: Joury Tarak Mohammed Ismail
- Date of birth: 12 March 2003 (age 23)
- Place of birth: Saudi Arabia
- Positions: Forward; midfielder

Team information
- Current team: Al Qadsiah FC
- Number: 19

Senior career*
Years	Team	Apps	(Gls)
–2021	Storm WFC		
2021–2022	Jeddah Eagles		
2022–2025	Al-Ittihad	27	(5)

International career^{‡}
2022–	Saudi Arabia	16	(0)
- * Club domestic league appearances and goals as of 30 December 2023 ‡ National team caps and goals as of 12 January 2024

Joury Tarak Mohammed Ismail (Arabic: جوري طارق محمد إسماعيل; born 12 March 2003) is a Saudi professional footballer who plays as a forward or a midfielder for Saudi Women's Premier League club Al Qadsiah FC and the Saudi Arabia national team.

== Club career ==
Tarek started playing football at the age of 8, playing with relatives in the backyard as finding girls' teams was challenging at the time.

Tarek played with the Storm (now Al-Shabab) before joining Jeddah Eagles in 2021.

=== Al-Ittihad ===
Following the acquisition of Jeddah Eagles by Al-Ittihad, including its players and staff, Tarek subsequently joined Al-Ittihad. On 15 October 2022, she debuted for Al-Ittihad in a 3–1 win against rivals Al-Ahli. On 21 October 2022, She scored her first goal for the club, leveling the score against Eastern Flames in the 17th minute.

On 15 February 2023, Al-Ittihad announced the renewal of Tarek's contract for two seasons up to 2025.

== International career ==
In 2022, with the formation of the Saudi Arabia women's national football team, Tarek received her first call-up to join the team for its debut international matches against Seychelles and the Maldives in a friendly tournament trio. On 20 February 2022, she debuted for the team in the match against Seychelles when she came as a substitute for Al Bandari Mobarak in the 54th minute.

== Career statistics ==
=== Club ===
As of match played 30 December 2023

Appearances and goals by club, season and competition
Club	Season	League			Cup		Continental		Total	
Club	Season	Division	Apps	Goals	Apps	Goals	Apps	Goals	Apps	Goals
Al-Ittihad	2022–23	SWPL	14	2	–	–	—		14	2
Al-Ittihad	2023–24	SWPL	13	3	2	0	—		15	3
Al-Ittihad	2024-25	SWPL	3	0	1	0			4	0
Al-Ittihad	Total		27	5	2	0	—		33	5
Career total			27	5	2	0	—		33	5

=== International ===
As of match played 12 January 2024

Appearances and goals by national team and year
National team	Year	Apps	Goals
Saudi Arabia	2022	4	0
Saudi Arabia	2023	11	0
Saudi Arabia	2024	1	0
Total		16	0
