= Farah Jefry =

Saudi Arabian footballer (born 2003)

Personal information
- Full name: Farah Hosamaldin Jefry
- Date of birth: 12 January 2003 (age 23)
- Place of birth: Jeddah, Saudi Arabia
- Height: 1.65 m (5 ft 5 in)
- Position: Midfielder

Team information
- Current team: Eastern Flames (on loan from Al-Ittihad Club)

Youth career
- 2018–2020: Jeddah Eagles

Senior career*
Years	Team	Apps	(Gls)
2020–2022	Jeddah Eagles	-	(-)
2022–	Al-Ittihad Club	12	(1)
2025–	→ Eastern Flames (loan)	0	(0)

International career
2022–2024	Saudi Arabia	1	(0)
- * Club domestic league appearances and goals

Farah Hosamaldin Jefry (Arabic: فرح حسام الدين الجفري; born 12 January 2003) is a Saudi Arabian footballer who plays as a midfielder for Eastern Flames on loan from Al-Ittihad Club.

== Personal life ==
Jefry was born in Jeddah, Saudi Arabia to an Indonesian father and an American mother. She started playing football at the age of eight. She attended Manarat Jeddah International School.

Jefry is popularly known as the "Saudi De Bruyne". She has regarded Argentina international Lionel Messi as her football idol.

In 2021, she became the first Saudi sportswoman to serve as an ambassador for Adidas. She took part in their "Weaved as One" campaign which paid homage to unity through football and Saudi culture. She also attended the 2022 World Cup, witnessing Saudi Arabia's shocking victory over Argentina.

In April 2025, she was announced as a Pepsi ambassador, joining several other players such as Alexia Putellas, Caroline Graham Hansen, and Lauren James. In addition, Visa launched its “She's Next in Football” program in Saudi Arabia, appointing Jefry as the initiative's brand ambassador.

== Club career ==
In 2018, Jefry began her career with the Jeddah Eagles (now Al-Ittihad) at the age of 15. Jefry was the top scorer in the 2020–21 Champions Cup.

In early 2023, she suffered an ACL injury playing in the 2023 Women's Futsal Tournament. She returned to training in October 2023.

In September 2025, she renewed her contract with Al-Ittihad through 2026 and was subsequently loaned to Eastern Flames.

== International career ==
Jefry has featured for the Saudi women's national team. The team won the inaugural SAFF Women's International Friendly Tournament.
