= Bayan Sadagah =

Saudi footballer

Personal information
- Full name: Bayan Bahaaeldin Hashem Sadagah
- Date of birth: 15 November 1994 (age 31)
- Place of birth: Saudi Arabia
- Positions: Forward; midfielder

Team information
- Current team: Al-Ittihad
- Number: 2

Senior career*
| Years | Team | Apps | (Gls) |
| 2017–2022 | Jeddah Eagles | | |
| 2022– | Al-Ittihad | 34 | (3) |

International career^{‡}
| 2022– | Saudi Arabia | 21 | (1) |
- * Club domestic league appearances and goals as of 3 February 2023 ‡ National team caps and goals as of 12 January 2024

Bayan Bahaaeldin Hashem Sadagah (Arabic: بَيَان بَهَاء الدِّين هَاشِم صَدَقَة; born 15 November 1994) is a Saudi professional footballer who plays as a midfielder and a forward for Saudi Women's Premier League club Al-Ittihad and the Saudi Arabia women's national team. She captains both teams.

== Personal life ==
In 2023 FIFA+ documentary Destined to Play: The Untold Story of Saudi Women's Footbal, Sadagah revealed she works as a nurse in an emergency unit.

== Club career ==
Sadagah started playing football at home before joining Jeddah's based team Jeddah Eagles women's team. She with Jeddah Eagles team won the Jeddah Women's Football League for the 2019/2020 season after defeating the Miraas team 2–1 in the final round. This league marked the first official women's football championship under the umbrella of the Saudi Arabian Football Federation, Sadagah won the Best Player award. She played for Jeddah Eagles until its acquisition by Al-Ittihad, where she chose to continue with Al-Ittihad. She played her debut match for Al-Ittihad on 15 October 2023. She scored her first goal for the club on 21 October 2023 in a 2–2 draw to Eastern Flames, scoring in the 67th minute.

== International career ==
Sadagah was called to the first-ever Saudi Arabia women's national football team in February 2022. On 20 February 2022, she debuted for the team as a starter in a 2–0 win against Seychelles. She scored her first international goal in a 3–3 draw against Bhutan on 24 September 2022, scoring in the 15th minute.

== Career statistics ==
=== Club ===
As of match played 30 December 2023

Appearances and goals by club, season and competition
| Club | Season | League | | | Cup | | Total | |
| Club | Season | Division | Apps | Goals | Apps | Goals | Apps | Goals |
|---|---|---|---|---|---|---|---|---|
| Al-Ittihad | 2022–23 | SWPL | 14 | 3 | – | – | 14 | 3 |
| Al-Ittihad | 2023–24 | SWPL | 14 | 0 | 3 | 0 | 17 | 0 |
| Al-Ittihad | 2024-25 | SWPL | 6 | 0 | 1 | 0 | 7 | 0 |
| Al-Ittihad | Total | | 34 | 3 | 3 | 0 | 39 | 3 |
| Career total | | | 34 | 3 | 3 | 0 | 39 | 3 |

=== International ===
As of match played 24 February 2024

Appearances and goals by national team and year
| National team | Year | Apps | Goals |
|---|---|---|---|
| Saudi Arabia | 2022 | 4 | 1 |
| Saudi Arabia | 2023 | 13 | 0 |
| Saudi Arabia | 2024 | 4 | 0 |
| Total | | 21 | 1 |

Scores and results list Saudi Arabia's goal tally first, score column indicates score after each Sadagah goal.

List of international goals scored by Bayan Sadagah
| No. | Date | Venue | Opponent | Score | Result | Competition |
|---|---|---|---|---|---|---|
| 1. | 24 September 2022 | Prince Sultan bin Abdul Aziz Stadium, Abha, Saudi Arabia | Bhutan | 1–1 | 3–3 | Friendly |

== Honours ==
Saudi Arabia

- SAFF Women's International Friendly Tournament winner: Khobar 2023
