= Daliah Abu Laban =

Saudi footballer (born 2000)

Personal information
- Full name: Daliah Adel Ahmed Abu Laban
- Date of birth: 4 April 1995 (age 31)
- Place of birth: Saudi Arabia
- Position: Striker

Team information
- Current team: Al-Ittihad
- Number: 20

Senior career*
Years	Team	Apps	(Gls)
2017–2022	Storm	?	(+11)
2022–2023	Al-Shabab	14	(11)
2023–2026	Al-Ahli	9	(0)
2026–	Al-Ittihad		

International career^{‡}
2021–	Saudi Arabia Futsal	0	(0)
2022–	Saudi Arabia	6	(1)
- * Club domestic league appearances and goals as of 30 December 2023 ‡ National team caps and goals as of 30 September 2023 (UTC)

Daliah Adel Ahmed Abu Laban (Arabic: داليه عادل أحمد أبو لبن; born 4 April 1995) is a Saudi professional footballer who plays as a striker for Saudi Women's Premier League club Al-Ittihad and Saudi Arabia women's national team.

== Club career ==
Abu Laban, who holds a bachelor's degree in nursing, She began her football career with the Storm's team in 2017 before it was acquired by Al-Shabab in October 2022. She notably stood out with her team in the first edition of the Women's Regional League. She solidified her success by winning the top scorer title in the Western region with 11 goals.

=== Al-Shabab ===
She featured in Al-Shabab first ever match, a 2–4 loss to Al Hilal, she scored her the club's first goal in the 16th minute in the same match. Abu Laban finished the 2022–23 season scoring 11 goals, the most by any Saudi player in the league.

=== Al-Ahli ===
In March 2023, Al-Ahli announced the signing of Abu Laban coming from Al-Shabab for 3 seasons until 2026. on 14 October 2023, she played her first game for the club, starting in a 1–0 loss against her former club Al-Shabab.

=== Al-Ittihad ===
On 11 August 2026, Al-Ittihad signed Abu Laban to compete with the team in the 2026–27 Saudi Women's Premier League.

== International career ==
Abu Laban was part of the first Saudi Arabia women's national football team that played Maldives and Seychelles in February 2022. On 20 February 2022, she made her debut for the team after she came as substitute for Noura Ibrahim in the 85th minute. On 15 January 2023, She scored her first international goal against Comoros in the 91st minute.

== Career statistics ==
=== Club ===
As of match played 30 December 2023

Appearances and goals by club, season and competition
Club	Season	League			Cup		Continental		Other		Total	
Club	Season	Division	Apps	Goals	Apps	Goals	Apps	Goals	Apps	Goals	Apps	Goals
Al-Shabab	2023–24	SWPL	14	11	—		—		—		14	11
Al-Shabab	Total		14	11	—		—		—		14	11
Al-Ahli	2023–24	SWPL	7	0	2	0	—		—		9	0
Al-Ahli	Total		7	0	2	0	—		—		9	0
Career total			21	0	2	0	—		—		23	11

=== International ===
As of match played 30 September 2023

Appearances and goals by national team and year
National team	Year	Apps	Goals
Saudi Arabia	2022	1	0
Saudi Arabia	2023	5	1
Total		6	1

Scores and results list Saudi Arabia's goal tally first, score column indicates score after each Abu Laban goal.

List of international goals scored by Daliah Abu Laban
No.	Date	Venue	Opponent	Score	Result	Competition
1.	15 January 2023	Prince Saud bin Jalawi Stadium, Khobar, Saudi Arabia	Comoros	2–0	2–0	2023 SAFF Women's International Friendly Tournament

== Honours ==
Al-Ahli

- SAFF Women's Cup:

(gold) Champion: 2023–24
