= Fatimah Mansour =

Saudi footballer

Personal information
- Full name: Fatimah Mansour Al-Omaisi
- Date of birth: 10 December 2007 (age 18)
- Place of birth: Saudi Arabia
- Height: 1.56 m (5 ft 1 in)
- Positions: Attacking midfielder; forward

Team information
- Current team: Al Hilal
- Number: 19

Youth career
- 2021–2023: Al Yamamah

Senior career*
Years	Team	Apps	(Gls)
2021–2023	Al Yamamah	14	(2)
2023–2024	Al-Shabab	12	(1)
2024–2025	Al-Ittihad	20	(4)
2025–	Al Hilal	15	(2)

International career^{‡}
2023–	Saudi Arabia U17	6	(1)
2023–	Saudi Arabia U20	0	(0)
2023–	Saudi Arabia	13	(0)
- * Club domestic league appearances and goals as of 23 April 2026 ‡ National team caps and goals as of 12 January 2024

Fatimah Mansour Al-Omaisi (Arabic: فاطمة منصور العميسي; born 10 December 2007), known as Fatimah Mansour, is a Saudi professional footballer who plays as an attacking midfielder and a forward for Saudi Premier League club Al Hilal and the Saudi Arabia national team.

== Club career ==
Aged 14, Mansour joined Al Yamamah in 2021, primarily participating in futsal. Despite her youth, Mansour appeared in all Al-Yamamah matches during the 2022–23 season scoring two goals. Mansour was part of Al Yamamah futsal team, which was crowned champions in both the Saudi Games and the Women's Futsal Championship.

Following Al-Shabab's acquisition of Al Yamamah, Mansour opted to remain with Al-Shabab. She made her debut for Al-Shabab on August 24, 2023, in the Jordanian-Saudi Women's Club Championship, where the team suffered a 3–4 defeat. She scored her first goal for Al-Shabab in the 74th minute in the 2023–24 SAFF Women's Cup against Jeddah Club. After the initiation of the Saudi U-17 Women's tournament in October 2023, Mansour joined the Al-Shabab under-17 team. Her remarkable performance continued as Al-Shabab dominated its opponents, winning 24–0 and 17–0, with Fatimah Mansour contributing 21 goals, securing her position as the top scorer in the tournament.

Mansour later joined Al-Ittihad before signing for Al Hilal in August 2025. In July 2026, she extended her contract with Al Hilal for an additional two years.

== International career ==
at the age of 15, Mansour received her first call-up to the national team for the 2023 SAFF Women's International Friendly Tournament in Khobar, making her the youngest player ever called up to the senior national team. On 11 January 2023, She made her debut for the senior team as starter in a 1–0 win over Mauritius.

In February 2023, Mansour was selected for the inaugural under-17 team to face Kuwait in double friendly matches. On 4 March 2023, she debuted for the team in their first international game, a 4–1 loss to Kuwait. In the second match, she scored her first goal for the team in the 35th minute, contributing to the team first ever win.

In December 2023, following the establishment of the under-20 team, head coach Pauline Hamill selected Mansour to participate in a training camp held in Riyadh.

== Career statistics ==
=== Club ===
As of match played 27 September 2024

Appearances and goals by club, season and competition
Club	Season	League			Cup		Continental		Other		Total	
Club	Season	Division	Apps	Goals	Apps	Goals	Apps	Goals	Apps	Goals	Apps	Goals
Al Yamamah	2022-23	SWPL	14	2	—		—		—		14	2
Al Yamamah	Total		14	2	—		—		—		14	2
Al-Shabab	2023–24	SWPL	14	0	4	2	—		3	0	12	1
Al-Shabab	Total		14	0	4	2	—		3	0	21	2
Al-Ittihad	2024–25	SWPL	3	0	1	1	—		—		4	1
Al-Ittihad	Total		3	0	1	1	—		—		4	1
Career total			31	2	5	3	—		3	0	39	5

=== International ===
Statistics accurate as of match played 8 January 2024.

Year	Saudi Arabia	
Year	Apps	Goals
2023	12	0
2024	1	0
Total	13	0

Scores and results list Saudi Arabia's goal tally first, score column indicates score after each Mansour goal.

List of international goals scored by Fatimah Mansour
No.	Date	Venue	Opponent	Score	Result	Competition
1	29 October 2025	321 Sports Stadium, Abu Dhabi, United Arab Emirates	Singapore	2–0	5–0	Friendly
2	26 February 2026	Al Ahli Stadium, Manama, Bahrain	Bahrain	3–0	3–0	Friendly
3	10 June 2026	Windmill Football Club Stadium, Bangkok, Thailand	Laos	2–0	4–0	Friendly
4	10 June 2026	Windmill Football Club Stadium, Bangkok, Thailand	Laos	4–0	4–0	Friendly

== Honours ==
Saudi Arabia

- SAFF Women's International Friendly Tournament winner: Khobar 2023

Al Yamamah (futsal)

- Saudi Games Futsal Tournament runners-up: 2022
- Ramadan Women's Futsal Championship: 2023

Al-Shabab (futsal)

- Saudi Games Futsal Tournament: 2023

Individual

- Ramadan Women's Futsal Championship best young player: 2023
