= Talah Al-Ghamdi =

Saudi footballer

Personal information
- Full name: Talah Zuhair Ali Al-Daif Al-Ghamdi
- Date of birth: 18 November 1999 (age 26)
- Place of birth: Jeddah, Saudi Arabia
- Position: Defender

Team information
- Current team: Al-Ittihad
- Number: 4

Senior career*
Years	Team	Apps	(Gls)
2018–2022	Jeddah Eagles		
2022–	Al-Ittihad	24	(0)

International career^{‡}
2022–	Saudi Arabia	14	(0)
- * Club domestic league appearances and goals as of 30 December 2023 ‡ National team caps and goals as of 12 January 2024

Talah Zuhair Ali Al-Daif Al-Ghamdi (Arabic: تَالَة زُهَيْر عَلِيّ الضَّيْف الْغَامِدِيّ; born 18 November 1999) Simply known as Talah Al-Ghamdi is a Saudi professional footballer who plays as a defender for Saudi Women's Premier League club Al-Ittihad and the Saudi Arabia national team.

== Early life ==
Talah Al-Ghamdi has loved playing football since she was young. When she was six, she used to play with her cousins in the house, she also played with boys as a kid.

== Club career ==
=== Jeddah Eagles: 2018–2022 ===
In 2018, Al-Ghamdi joined Jeddah Eagles aged 19, where she was given the opportunity to play in the Jeddah Women's League. She won with the team in the first women's league in December 2019, where her name stood out in the first-ever official league organized by Saudi Arabia. She attracted attention again when she was chosen as the best player in July 2020. She won the SAFF Women's Regional West Football Championship with the Eagles. Al-Ghamdi through winning the west Regional League they qualified to play in the Women's National Football Championship, where the team finished fourth.

=== Al-Ittihad Club: 2022–present ===
In September 2022, Al-Ittihad acquired the Jeddah Eagles team, including its staff and players, and Al-Ghamdi decided to remain with Al-Ittihad. She played her debut match for the club on 15 October 2022, in a 3–1 win against Al-Ahli.

In February 2023, Al-Ittihad revealed the extension of Al-Ghamdi's contract for an additional two seasons, now lasting until 2025.

== International career ==
In February 2022, Al-Ghamdi received her first call-up to the newly established Saudi Arabia women's national football team. On 20 February 2022, she made her debut as a starter, in a 2–0 win against Seychelles.

== Career statistics ==
=== Club ===
As of match played 30 December 2023

Appearances and goals by club, season and competition
Club	Season	League			Cup		Continental		Total	
Club	Season	Division	Apps	Goals	Apps	Goals	Apps	Goals	Apps	Goals
Al-Ittihad	2022–23	SWPL	14	0	–	–	—		14	0
Al-Ittihad	2023–24	SWPL	14	0	2	1	—		16	1
Al-Ittihad	2024-25	SWPL	3	0	1	0	—		4	0
Al-Ittihad	Total		31	0	3	1	—		34	1
Career total			31	0	3	1	—		34	1

=== International ===
As of match played 8 January 2024

Appearances and goals by national team and year
National team	Year	Apps	Goals
Saudi Arabia	2022	4	0
Saudi Arabia	2023	8	0
Saudi Arabia	2024	1	0
Total		13	0

== International goals ==
No.	Date	Venue	Opponent	Score	Result	Competition
1.	7 December 2024	Aspire Academy Stadium, Doha, Qatar	Pakistan	1–0	1–1	Friendly

== Honours ==
Saudi Arabia

- SAFF Women's International Friendly Tournament winner: Khobar 2023

Jeddah Eagles

- SAFF Women's Regional West Football Championship winner: 2021–2022
