= Fadwa Khaled =

Saudi footballer (born 2005)

Personal information
- Full name: Fadwa Abdullah Abdulmohsen Khaled
- Date of birth: 27 January 2005 (age 21)
- Position: Winger

Team information
- Current team: Al-Qadsiah

Senior career*
Years	Team	Apps	(Gls)
2022–2026	Al-Ahli	39	(6)
2026–	Al-Qadsiah		

International career
2024–	Saudi Arabia U20	2	(0)
2023–	Saudi Arabia	8	(0)
- * Club domestic league appearances and goals

Fadwa Abdullah Abdulmohsen Khaled (Note: In this name that follows Arab naming customs, the given name is Fadwa, the patronymic is Abdullah (father's name), Abdulmohsen (grandfather's name), and the family name is Khaled.) (Arabic: فدوى عبد الله عبد المحسن خالد; born 27 January 2005) is a Saudi footballer who plays as a forward for Saudi Women's Premier League club Al-Qadsiah and the Saudi Arabia national team.

== Club career ==
Fadwa has been with Al-Ahli since the club's founding but her performances improved towards the end of the 2023–24 season and into the 2024–25 season. By the 11th round, she had scored 5 goals, including one that was awarded Goal of the Week in the 8th week.

In August 2026, Al-Qadsiah signed Khaled to compete with the team in the 2026–27 Saudi Women's Premier League.

== International career ==
In February 2023, Fadwa got her first call-up to the senior national team by coach Rosa Lappi-Seppälä to face Indonesia in friendlies. It wasn't until September 2023, that she made her debut for the team. coming on as a substitute for Fatimah Mansour in the 63rd minute against Bhutan.

In March 2024, she was called up by Under-20 coach Pauline Hamill for the team's first international matches against Mauritania.

== International goals ==
No.	Date	Venue	Opponent	Score	Result	Competition
1.	28 November 2025	Hall Stadium – King Abdullah Sports City, Jeddah, Saudi Arabia	United Arab Emirates	4–0	5–0	2025 WAFF Women's Championship
2.	28 February 2026	Al Ahli Stadium, Manama, Bahrain	Bahrain	2–0	3–0	Friendly
3.	2 March 2026	Prince Saud bin Jalawi Stadium, Khobar, Saudi Arabia	Kyrgyzstan	2–0	2–0	Friendly

== Career statistics ==
=== Club ===
As of 31 January 2025

Appearances and goals by club, season and competition
Club	Season	League			SAFF Women's Cup		Asia		Other		Total	
Club	Season	Division	Apps	Goals	Apps	Goals	Apps	Goals	Apps	Goals	Apps	Goals
Al-Ahli	2022–23	SWPL	13	1	—		—		—		13	1
Al-Ahli	2023–24	SWPL	10	1	3	0	—		—		13	1
Al-Ahli	2024–25	SWPL	13	5	2	0	—		—		15	5
Career total			36	7	5	0	—		—		41	7
