= Monika Staab =

German footballer (born 1959)

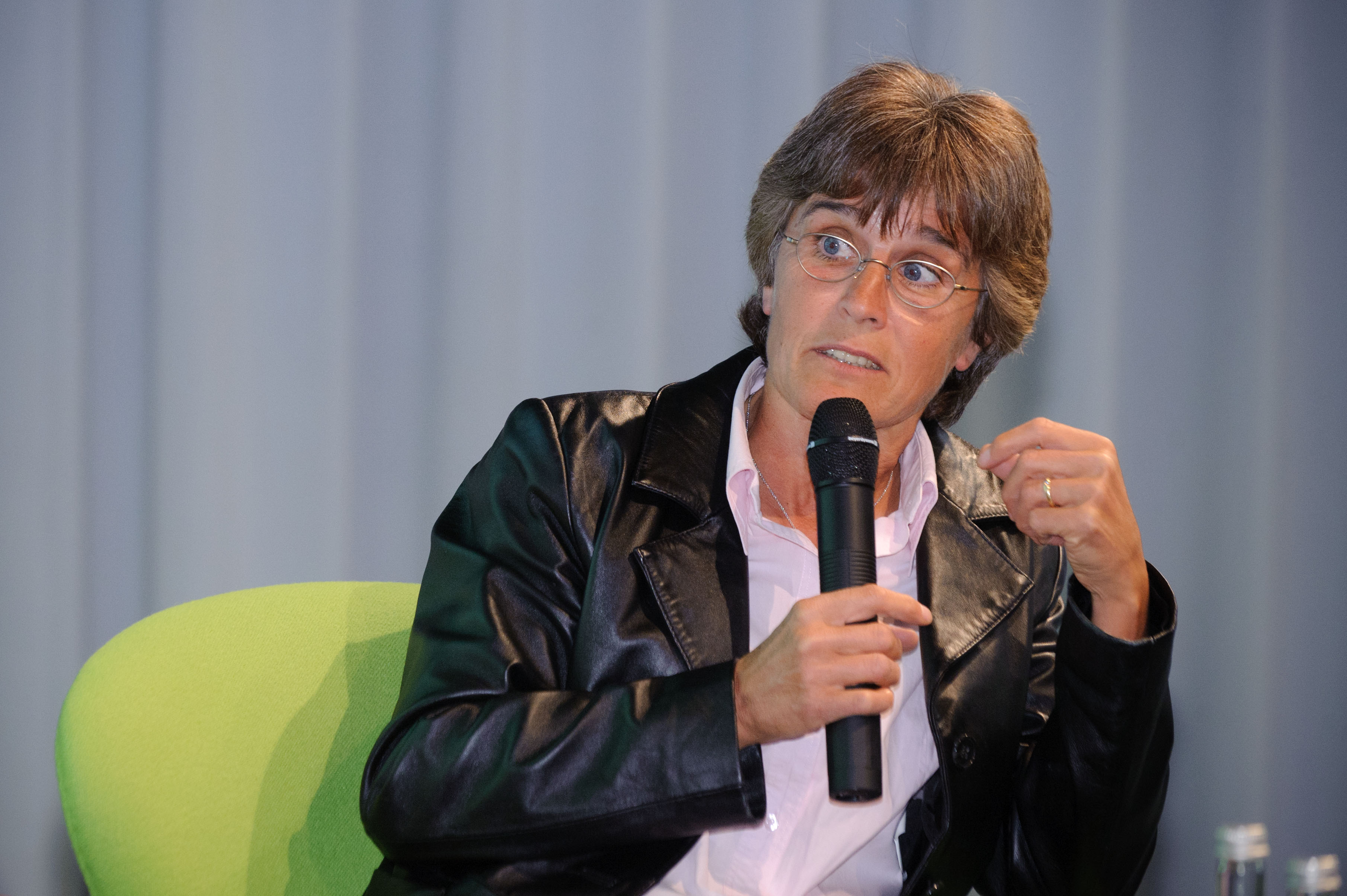
- Staab in 2011

Personal information
- Date of birth: 9 January 1959 (age 67)
- Place of birth: Dietzenbach, West Germany
- Height: 1.64 m (5 ft 5 in)
- Position: Midfielder

Senior career*
| Years | Team | Apps | (Gls) |
| 1970–1974 | SG Rosenhöhe Offenbach | | |
| 1974–1977 | Kickers Offenbach | | |
| 1977–1978 | NSG Oberst Schiel | | |
| 1978– | Paris Saint-Germain | | |
- Queens Park Rangers
| –1984 | Southampton WFC | | |
| 1984–1992 | SG Praunheim | | |

Managerial career
- 1993–1999: SG Praunheim
- 1999–2004: 1. FFC Frankfurt
- 2007: Bahrain
- 2013–2014: Qatar
- 2021–2023: Saudi Arabia
- 2023–: Saudi Arabia (technical director)
- * Club domestic league appearances and goals

Monika Staab (born 9 January 1959) is a former German football player and currently the technical director of Saudi Arabia women's national football team.

== Playing career ==
As a player, she represented the senior team of SG Rosenhöhe Offenbach already at the age of 11, furthermore Kickers Offenbach and NSG Oberst Schiel in Germany and played for clubs abroad such as Paris Saint-Germain and Queens Park Rangers.

== Managerial career ==
She was the manager of the women’s Bundesliga side 1. FFC Frankfurt from 1993 to 2004. She was also the chairman of the club. She won the UEFA Women's Cup in 2002, the German championship in 1999, 2001, 2002 and 2003 and the German cup in 1999, 2000, 2001, 2002 and 2003.

From 2012 until 2014, Staab was 15 months in charge of Qatar women's national football team.

In August 2021, Staab was appointed as the coach of Saudi Arabia's women's national team. In February 2023, she became a technical director of the Saudi women's department.
