= Sandra Kälin =

Swiss football manager and former footballer (born 1971)

Sandra Kälin (born 6 November 1971) is a Swiss football manager and former footballer who is assistant manager of Saudi Arabia women's national football team.

== Playing career ==
Kälin played as a midfielder or forward. She represented the Switzerland women's national football team internationally and played club football in Germany and Switzerland and beach soccer.

== Managerial career ==
In 2022, Kälin was appointed assistant manager of the Saudi Arabia women's national football team.
