= Lana Abdulrazak =

Saudi footballer (born 2005)

Personal information
- Full name: Lana Reda Jamel Abdulrazak
- Date of birth: 22 May 2005 (age 21)
- Place of birth: Jeddah, Saudi Arabia
- Height: 1.68 m (5 ft 6 in)
- Positions: Midfielder; defender

Team information
- Current team: Al-Ittihad
- Number: 15

Youth career
- 2010–2017: Red Sea FC

Senior career*
Years	Team	Apps	(Gls)
–2022	Jeddah Eagles		
2022–	Al-Ittihad	29	(4)

International career^{‡}
2021–	Saudi Arabia Futsal	11	(3)
2022–	Saudi Arabia	44	(5)
- * Club domestic league appearances and goals as of 30 December 2023 ‡ National team caps and goals as of 2 December 2025

Lana Reda Jamel Abdulrazak (Arabic: لَانَا رِضَا جَمَال عَبْد الرَّزَّاق; born 22 May 2005) is a Saudi professional footballer who plays as a midfielder for Saudi Women's Premier League club Al-Ittihad and the Saudi Arabia national team.

== Club career ==
At the age of 5, Abdulrazak started playing football at Red Sea Football Club and continued there until 2017. She later joined Jeddah Eagles, where she continued playing until the team was acquired by Al-Ittihad. Following the acquisition, Al-Ittihad retained Abdulrazak as a part of their squad list for the 2022–23 season. On 15 October, She debuted for the team as a starter and scored her first goal in the 45th minute.

In April 2023, Al-Ittihad renewed Abdulrazak's contract for an additional two seasons, extending it until 2025. In August 2023, Abdulrazak was sent to IMG Academy in the United States by the Saudi Arabian Football Federation.

== International career ==
=== Football ===
In February 2022, Abdulrazak was called to the first-ever Saudi women's national team to participate in two friendlies against Seychelles and the Maldives. On 20 February 2022 she played on the senior national team for the first time. She started the 2–0 friendly win against Seychelles. On 22 February 2023 she scored her first international goal against Indonesia equalizing the score in the 85th minute to settle the team for a draw.

=== Futsal ===
Abdulrazak has played for the Senior national team since 2021, when she got selected to participate in a training camp in Croatia. She was selected to represent Saudi Arabia in their WAFF Women's Futsal Championship's debut in 2022. She was the Saudi's top scorer in the tournament scoring three goals.

== Career statistics ==
=== Club ===
As of match played 8 January 2024

Appearances and goals by club, season and competition
Club	Season	League			Cup		Total	
Club	Season	Division	Apps	Goals	Apps	Goals	Apps	Goals
Al-Ittihad	2022–23	SWPL	14	4	–	–	14	4
Al-Ittihad	2023–24	SWPL	12	0	3	0	15	0
Al-Ittihad	2024-25	SWPL	3	0	1	3	4	3
Al-Ittihad	Total		29	4	3	0	33	7
Career total			29	4	3	0	33	7

=== International ===
As of match played 8 January 2024

Appearances and goals by national team and year
National team	Year	Apps	Goals
Saudi Arabia	2022	4	0
Saudi Arabia	2023	13	1
Saudi Arabia	2024	3	1
Total		21	2

Scores and results list Saudi Arabia's goal tally first, score column indicates score after each Abdulrazak goal.

No.	Date	Venue	Opponent	Score	Result	Competition
1.	22 February 2023	Prince Mohamed bin Fahd Stadium, Dammam, Saudi Arabia	Indonesia	1–1	1–1	International Friendly
2.	21 February 2024	King Abdullah Sports City Reserve Stadium, Jeddah, Saudi Arabia	Lebanon	1–3	2–3	2024 WAFF Women's Championship

== Honours ==
Saudi Arabia

- SAFF Women's International Friendly Tournament winner: Khobar 2023

Saudi Arabia futsal

- WAFF Women's Futsal Championship runners-up: 2022
