= Louloua Moussa =

Saudi footballer (born 2006)

Personal information
- Full name: Louloua Abdulellah Nezar Moussa
- Date of birth: 27 October 2006 (age 20)
- Place of birth: Saudi Arabia
- Position: Goalkeeper

Team information
- Current team: Al-Ittihad
- Number: 34

Senior career*
| Years | Team | Apps | (Gls) |
| 2024– | Al-Ittihad | | |

International career
| 2023 | Saudi Arabia U17 | | |
| 2024– | Saudi Arabia U20 | | |
- * Club domestic league appearances and goals

Louloua Abdulellah Nezar Moussa (Arabic: لولوه عبدالإله نزار موسى; born 27 October 2006) is a Saudi Arabian footballer who plays as a goalkeeper for Saudi Women's Premier League club Al-Ittihad.

== Club career ==
Moussa started playing in the first edition 2023/24 of SAFF Women's U-17 Tournament with RTC Jeddah team (The Regional Training Center - Jeddah).

In the following season, 2024/2025, Moussa played for Al-Ittihad in the 2024–25 Saudi Women's Premier League participating in two matches as a substitute against Al-Taraji and Eastern Flames.

== International career ==
In February 2023, Louloua Moussa was selected for the inaugural under-17 team to face Kuwait in double friendly matches.

In March 2024, with the under-20 team, head coach Pauline Hamill selected Moussa to play against Mauritania in double friendly matches, achieving their first international victory (3–0) in Jeddah.

In August 2025, Spanish coach Xavier Vilamala decided to call up Moussa to the under-20 team, to participate with them in the qualifiers for the 2026 AFC U-20 Women's Asian Cup qualification, in which her team is participating for the first time in its history.
