= Al Bandari Al-Hwsawi =

Saudi footballer (born 1993)

Personal information
- Full name: Al Bandari Mohammed Zakrya Al-Hwsawi
- Date of birth: 9 May 1993 (age 33)
- Place of birth: Saudi Arabia
- Position: Forward

Team information
- Current team: Al Hilal
- Number: 8

Senior career*
Years	Team	Apps	(Gls)
–2021	Blue Arrows FFC		
2021–2022	Challenge FC	15	(6)
2022–	Al Hilal	12	(0)

International career^{‡}
2019–	Saudi Arabia Futsal	11	(3)
2022–	Saudi Arabia	11	(1)
- * Club domestic league appearances and goals as of 30 December 2023 ‡ National team caps and goals as of 12 January 2024

Al Bandari Mohammed Zakrya Al-Hwsawi (Arabic: البندري محمد زكريا الهوساوي; born 9 May 1993) or simply known as Al Bandary Hwsawi is a Saudi professional footballer who plays as a forward for Saudi Women's Premier League club Al Hilal and the Saudi Arabia national team.

== Club career ==
Al-Hwsawi started playing football in 2017, with Riyadh based team Blue Arrows Female FC. whom she participated with at the Women's Community Football League.

After She joined the Challenge FC, she participated with the team in the SAFF Women's Regional Football Championship, where she was named the best player in the Central Province. Later on she went on with the team to finish second in the inaugural Women's National Football Championship, where she again won the best player award.

Al-Hwsawi was a player for Challenge FC before its acquisition by Al-Hilal. Following a cruciate ligament injury, she experienced an absence from the field for almost 10 months. In August 2022, she underwent successful arthroscopic surgery, causing her to miss the entire 2022–23 season.

== International career ==
Al-Hwsawi made her first international appearance for any Saudi team in February 2022 as she was selected for the newly established Saudi Arabia women's national football team. The team was set to play two friendly matches against Seychelles and the Maldives. On 20 February, she started in a 2–0 win over Seychelles. On 24 September 2023, Al-Hwsawi scored her first international goal for the team, a late 90-minute goal that sent Saudi Arabia to the semi-finals of the 2023 SAFF Women's International Friendly Tournament in Taif.

In June 2022, Al-Hwsawi was selected as part of the Saudi national futsal team for the 2022 WAFF Women's Futsal Championship, This marked the team's debut in the tournament, where they clinched Silver.

== Career statistics ==
=== Club ===
As of match played 30 December 2023

Appearances and goals by club, season and competition
Club	Season	League			Cup		Continental		Other		Total	
Club	Season	Division	Apps	Goals	Apps	Goals	Apps	Goals	Apps	Goals	Apps	Goals
Al Hilal	2022–23	SWPL	0	0	–	–	—		—		0	0
Al Hilal	2023–24	SWPL	7	0	2	0	—		3	0	12	0
Al Hilal	Total		7	0	2	0	—		3	0	12	3
Career total			7	0	2	0	—		3	0	12	0

=== International ===
As of match played 8 January 2024

Appearances and goals by national team and year
National team	Year	Apps	Goals
Saudi Arabia	2022	2	0
Saudi Arabia	2023	8	1
Saudi Arabia	2024	1	0
Total		11	1

Scores and results list Saudi Arabia's goal tally first, score column indicates score after each Al-Hwsawi goal.

List of international goals scored by Al Bandari Al-Hwsawi
No.	Date	Venue	Opponent	Score	Result	Competition
1.	24 September 2023	King Fahd Sports City, Taif, Saudi Arabia	Pakistan	1–0	1–0	2023 SAFF Women's International Friendly Tournament

== Honours ==
Saudi Arabia

- SAFF Women's International Friendly Tournament winner: Khobar 2023

Saudi Arabia futsal

- WAFF Women's Futsal Championship runners-up: 2022

=== Individual ===
- SAFF Women's Regional Football League – Central Province Best Player: 2021–2022
