= Sara Khalid =

Saudi footballer (born 1996)

Personal information
- Full name: Sara Khalid Salman Al-Dossary
- Date of birth: 2 August 1996 (age 30)
- Place of birth: Saudi Arabia
- Height: 1.65 m (5 ft 5 in)
- Position: Goalkeeper

Team information
- Current team: Al Qadsiah FC
- Number: 72

Senior career*
Years	Team	Apps	(Gls)
2021–2025	Al-Nassr	24	(0)

International career^{‡}
2019–	Saudi Arabia futsal	16	(0)
2022–	Saudi Arabia	12	(0)
Medal record
Women's futsal
Representing Saudi Arabia
WAFF Women's Futsal Championship
Runner-up	2022 Saudi Arabia
Women's football
Representing Saudi Arabia
SAFF Women's International Friendly Tournament
Winner	2023 Khobar
- * Club domestic league appearances and goals as of 30 December 2023 ‡ National team caps and goals as of 12 January 2024

Sara Khalid Salman Al-Dossary (Arabic: سَارَة خَالِد سَلْمَان الدَّوْسَرِيّ; born 8 August 1996) is a Saudi professional footballer and a futsal player who plays as a goalkeeper for Al Qadsiah FC in the Saudi Women's Premier League and was part of the Saudi Arabia national team and Saudi Arabia national futsal team.

== Club career ==
Sara Khalid used to play basketball, before switching to futsal in mid-2019 where she joined King Faisal University's futsal team. On 19 October 2021, she signed her first football contract with Al-Mamlaka women's team in Riyadh. she participated with the team in the first Women's National Football Championship organized by the Saudi Arabia Football Federation. Al-Mamlaka emerged as the champions, with Sara achieving the title of the best goalkeeper in the championship. This recognition paved the way for her selection to the first-ever Saudi national team.

In September 2022, Al Nassr acquired the Al-Mamlaka team to compete in the inaugural Saudi Women's Premier League. Sara's contract was renewed, and she played a critical role in Al-Nassr Premier League title.

In December 2023, Khalid was named the goalkeeper of the month in the 2023–24 Saudi Women's Premier League.

== International career ==
AlDossary was part of the first FIFA recognized Saudi Arabia national team, She captained the team in their first international game, achieving a 2–0 victory over Seychelles.

In January 2023, she was named in the squad for the 2023 SAFF Women's International Friendly Tournament, marking Saudi Arabia's inaugural participation. The team won the tournament and Sara was named the best Goalkeeper in the tournament winning the golden glove.

== Career statistics ==
=== Club ===
As of match played 30 December 2023

Appearances and goals by club, season and competition
Club	Season	League			Cup		Continental		Other		Total	
Club	Season	Division	Apps	Goals	Apps	Goals	Apps	Goals	Apps	Goals	Apps	Goals
Al Nassr	2022–23	SWPL	14	0	–	–	—		—		14	0
Al Nassr	2023–24	SWPL	3	0	2	0	—		5	0	10	0
Al Nassr	Total		17	0	2	0	—		5	0	24	0
Career total			17	0	2	0	—		5	0	24	0

=== International ===
Statistics accurate as of match played 30 September 2023.

Year	Saudi Arabia		Saudi Arabia Futsal	
Year	Apps	Goals	Apps	Goals
2019	–	–	5	0
2022	4	0	11	0
2023	9	0	–	–
Total	11	0	16	0

== Honours ==
Al-Nassr

- Saudi Women's Premier League: 2022–23,
  2023–24
- SAFF Women's National Football Championship: 2021–22
- Saudi–Jordanian Women's Clubs Championship third place: 2023

Saudi Arabia

- SAFF Women's International Friendly Tournament Winner: Khobar 2023

Individual

- SAFF Women's National Football Championship Best Goalkeeper: 2021–22
- SAFF Women's International Friendly Tournament Golden Glove: Khobar 2023
- Saudi Women's Premier League Goalkeeper of the Month: December 2023
