= Bahrain women's national football team =

Women's national association football team representing Bahrain

Bahrain
- Nickname: The Reds
- Association: Bahrain Football Association
- Confederation: AFC (Asia)
- Sub-confederation: WAFF (West Asia)
- Head coach: Adnan Hussain
- Captain: Yasmine Fayez
- Home stadium: Bahrain National Stadium
- FIFA code: BHR
First colours	Second colours

FIFA ranking
- Current: 116 ▼8 (16 June 2026)
- Highest: 64 (March 2010)
- Lowest: 116 (June 2026)

First international
- Jordan 6–1 Bahrain (Amman, Jordan; September 18, 2005)

Biggest win
- Bahrain 17–0 Qatar (Riffa, Bahrain; October 18, 2010)

Biggest defeat
- Jordan 9–0 Bahrain (Amman, Jordan; September 25, 2005)

WAFF Championship
- Appearances: 5 (first in 2005)
- Best result: Runners-up (2019)

The Bahrain women's national football team represents Bahrain in international women's football, and falls under the governance of the Bahrain Football Association, more specifically run by the women's committee at the association. Although having participated in several friendly tournaments, the team played its first official international match against the Maldives on April 22, 2007 and entered the FIFA Women's World Rankings in June 2007 at 111th out of 142 countries.

== History ==
The Bahrain Women's National Team is the first National Women's Football Team to be formed in the GCC region. This was a big step for the island nation and part of Bahrain's commitment to promoting women's sports. In 2004, Bahrain participated in a Futsal tournament in Amman, Jordan and the next year participated in the West Asian Football Federation Women's Championship 2005 held in the Jordanian capital, though none of the matches were FIFA officiated. The team placed 4th in this tournament. In February 2006, Bahrain participated in the first ever Arabian Women's Tournament held in Abu Dhabi, United Arab Emirates. The team was better prepared this time and brought home the 1st-place trophy as well as the Fair Play trophy. After this achievement, the sport became even more popular in the country and more girls have expressed their interest to join clubs. In an effort to improve the national team further, the committee put in a request to FIFA for a licensed female coach to lead the team. As a result, German coach Monika Staab was sent to Bahrain January 21, 2007 for a six-month development program. Under the guidance of Staab, the team played its first official FIFA approved match on April 22, 2007 against the national team of Maldives in Malé, Maldives. During this match, Bahrain put up a great match and managed to secure a historic 7–0 win.

== Results and fixtures ==
The following is a list of match results in the last 12 months, as well as any future matches that have been scheduled.

Win Draw Loss Fixture

=== 2026 ===
26 February Friendly	Bahrain	0–3	Saudi Arabia	Manama, Bahrain
21:00 UTC+3		Report	Tawfiq 55'; Khalid 57'; Al-Omaysi 79'	Stadium: Al Ahli Stadium

4 June Friendly	Bahrain	0–5	Kyrgyzstan	Manama, Bahrain
19:00 UTC+3			Saiakbaeva 21', 39'; Boronbekova 30', 52'; Ishembieva 60'	Stadium: BFA Outdoor Pitches; Referee: Alissar Baddour (Syria)

7 June Friendly	Bahrain	0–4	Kyrgyzstan	Manama, Bahrain
19:00 UTC+3			Turalieva 65'; Kurmanbekova 72'; Murzakulova 80'; Asanbekova 90+5'	Stadium: BFA Outdoor Pitches

== Coaching staff ==
=== Current coaching staff ===
Position	Name	Ref.
Head coach	(Bahrain) Adnan Hussain	WorldFootball.net

=== Manager history ===
- (Germany) Monika Staab (2007)
- (Bahrain) Adel Al-Marzooqi
- (Jordan) Maher Hantash
- (Bahrain) Ghazi Al-Majed
- (Bahrain) Adnan Ebrahim
- (Bahrain) Masoud Al-Ameeri
- (Bahrain) Khalid Al Harban (????–????)
- (Brazil) Bruno Pasquarelli (????–????)
- (Bahrain) Adnan Hussain (????–present)

== Players ==
=== Current squad ===
The following players were called up for the 2022 AFC Women's Asian Cup qualification on 24 October 2021.

Caps and goals correct as of 24 October 2021, after the match against Chinese Taipei.

No.	Pos.	Player	Date of birth (age)	Caps	Goals	Club
1	GK	Farah Sherif Ghaly	21 June 1997 (age 29)	3	0	{{{club}}}
12	GK	Nouf Khalid Al Khalifa	12 January 1989 (age 37)	43	0	{{{club}}}
22	GK	Khulood Saleh Adam	13 November 1997 (age 28)	4	0	{{{club}}}
3	DF	Hessa Abdulla Al Zayani	11 February 1997 (age 29)	18	0	{{{club}}}
6	DF	Noora Abdulaziz Khamis	26 March 1990 (age 36)	28	0	{{{club}}}
10	DF	Alyaa Juma Al Mudhahki	3 July 1989 (age 37)	45	2	{{{club}}}
13	DF	Manar Ebrahim Jassim	27 July 1994 (age 32)	45	13	(Saudi Arabian Football Federation) Al Mutahed
14	DF	Shaikha Abdulrahman Al Khalifa	6 January 1993 (age 33)	29	2	{{{club}}}
15	DF	Marwa Mohammed Mubarak	13 September 1988 (age 38)	51	0	{{{club}}}
19	DF	Razan Al Musawi	4 July 1999 (age 27)	5	0	{{{club}}}
20	DF	Reem Ebrahim Al Daaysi	2 October 1989 (age 37)	33	0	{{{club}}}
4	MF	Deena Abdulrahman	23 February 1983 (age 43)	30	11	{{{club}}}
5	MF	Al Anood Hamed Al Khalifa	10 July 1992 (age 34)	51	21	{{{club}}}
8	MF	Dwa Khalid Al Khalifa	29 November 1987 (age 38)	39	2	{{{club}}}
11	MF	Mona Khaled Abdulrahman	26 May 1993 (age 33)	23	2	{{{club}}}
16	MF	Rose Fayez Tobellah	28 January 1998 (age 28)	5	1	{{{club}}}
17	MF	Yasmeen Fayez Tobellah (captain)	17 September 1989 (age 37)	55	15	(Saudi Arabian Football Federation) Al Nassr
23	MF	Eman Rashed Al Khattal	14 March 1999 (age 27)	10	0	{{{club}}}
24	MF	Noor Anwar Zada	18 February 1998 (age 28)	4	0	{{{club}}}
25	MF	Latifa Mohammed Al Khalifa	23 April 2001 (age 25)	8	0	{{{club}}}
26	MF	Wesal Ahmed Al Yassi	5 July 2000 (age 26)	2	0	{{{club}}}
31	MF	Iman Ebrahim Ramadhan	7 January 1993 (age 33)	5	0	{{{club}}}
33	MF	Zainab Abdulhadi AlQaidoom	14 March 1997 (age 29)	1	0	{{{club}}}
7	FW	Reem Yusuf Al Hashmi	27 June 1987 (age 39)	58	51	{{{club}}}
9	FW	Noora Sami Al Dossary	1 August 2000 (age 26)	8	3	{{{club}}}
9	FW	Hessa Reyadh AlIsa	30 August 1995 (age 31)	7	4	(Saudi Arabian Football Federation) Al Nassr
18	FW	Phoebe Licence	20 August 1999 (age 27)	19	3	(United States Soccer Federation) Flagler Saints
21	FW	Zain Mohammed Al Khalifa	21 April 1991 (age 35)	2	3	{{{club}}}
27	FW	Rawan Nabeel Al Ali	26 October 2000 (age 25)	11	0	(Saudi Arabian Football Federation) United Eagles
29	FW	Amira Bader Swar	18 January 1998 (age 28)	4	0	(Saudi Arabian Football Federation) United Eagles
30	FW	Lilya Jaweed Sabkar	15 July 2002 (age 24)	2	0	(Saudi Arabian Football Federation) United Eagles
9	FW	Mona Ebrahim Al Daaysi	29 July 1992 (age 34)	21	5	{{{club}}}

== Competitive record ==
=== FIFA Women's World Cup ===
FIFA Women's World Cup record
Year	Result	Position	GP	W	D*	L	GF	GA	GD
(China) 2007	Did not enter								
(Germany) 2011	Did not enter								
(Canada) 2015	Did not qualify								
(France) 2019	Did not qualify								
(Australia) (New Zealand) 2023	Did not qualify								
(Brazil) 2027	Did not qualify								
(Costa Rica) (Jamaica) (Mexico) (United States) 2031	To be determined								
(United Kingdom) 2035	To be determined								
Total	0/8	–	–	–	–	–	–	–	–

*Draws include knockout matches decided on penalty kicks.

=== AFC Women's Asian Cup ===
AFC Women's Asian Cup record
Year	Result	GP	W	D*	L	GF	GA	GD
(Vietnam) 2008	Did not enter							
(China) 2010	Did not enter							
(Vietnam) 2014	Did not qualify							
(Jordan) 2018	Did not qualify							
(India) 2022	Did not qualify							
(Australia) 2026	Did not qualify							
(Uzbekistan) 2029	To be determined							
Total	0/5	–	–	–	–	–	–	–

*Draws include knockout matches decided on penalty kicks.

=== Asian Games ===
Asian Games record
Year	Result	Position	Pld	W	D	L	GF	GA
(China) 1990	Did not enter							
(Japan) 1994	Did not enter							
(Thailand) 1998	Did not enter							
(South Korea) 2002	Did not enter							
(Qatar) 2006	Did not enter							
(China) 2010	Did not enter							
(South Korea) 2014	Did not enter							
(Indonesia) 2018	Did not enter							
(China) 2022	Did not enter							
Total	0/9	-	-	-	-	-	-	-

=== WAFF Women's Championship ===
WAFF Women's Championship record
Hosts / Year	Result	GP	W	D*	L	GS	GA	GD
(Jordan) 2005	Fourth place	4	0	1	3	2	19	−17
(Jordan) 2007	Did not enter							
(United Arab Emirates) 2010	Third place	4	2	0	2	5	8	−3
(United Arab Emirates) 2011	Third place	5	2	2	1	22	6	+16
(Jordan) 2014	Third place	3	1	0	2	8	11	−3
(Bahrain) 2019	Runners-up	4	2	1	1	9	4	+5
(Jordan) 2022	Did not enter							
(Saudi Arabia) 2024	Did not enter							
Total	5/8	20	7	4	9	46	48	−2

*Draws include knockout matches decided on penalty kicks.

=== Arabia Cup ===
Arabia Cup record
Hosts / Year	Result	GP	W	D*	L	GS	GA	GD
(Bahrain) 2010	Third place	5	4	0	1	27	5	+22

== See also ==
- Sport in Bahrain
  - Football in Bahrain
    - Women's football in Bahrain
- Bahrain women's national under-20 football team
- Bahrain women's national under-17 football team
- Bahrain men's national football team
