= Hala Khashoggi =

Saudi footballer (born 1999)

Personal information
- Full name: Hala Ehab Khashoggi
- Date of birth: 11 October 1999 (age 27)
- Place of birth: Saudi Arabia
- Position: Defender

Team information
- Current team: Al-Ittihad
- Number: 11

Senior career*
Years	Team	Apps	(Gls)
2021–2022	Jeddah Eagles	?	(?)
2022–	Al-Ittihad	32	(0)

International career
2024–	Saudi Arabia		
- * Club domestic league appearances and goals

Hala Ehab Khashoggi (Arabic: هَلَّا إِيهَاب خَاشُقْجِيّ; born 11 October 1999) is a Saudi footballer who plays as a Defender for Saudi Women's Premier League side Al-Ittihad.

== Club career ==
Khashoggi played with Jeddah Eagles in the SAFF Women's National Football Championship.

Since Al-Ittihad acquired Jeddah Eagles in 2022, Khashoggi played in the 2022–23 Saudi Women's Premier League.

In April 2023, Al-Ittihad renewed Hala Khashoggi's contract, to play with them in the 2023–24 Saudi Women's Premier League.

== International career ==
On 7 February 2024, Spanish coach Luis Cortes decided to call up Khashoggi to the Saudi Arabia team ahead of its participation in the 2024 WAFF Women's Championship.

== Personal life ==
While playing football, Hala Khashoggi studied medicine to become a doctor.
