= Al Bandari Mobarak =

Saudi Arabian footballer (born 2001)

Al-Bandari Mobarak
Personal information
- Full name: Al-Bandari Mobarak Saud Abdullah
- Date of birth: 9 December 2001 (age 24)
- Position: Forward

Team information
- Current team: Al Hilal

Senior career*
Years	Team	Apps	(Gls)
–2023	Al Yamamah	14	(7)
2023–2025	Al Shabab	30	(10)
2025	Al Hilal	16	(10)

International career^{‡}
2022–	Saudi Arabia	40	(28)
- * Club domestic league appearances and goals ‡ National team caps and goals as of 10:38, 19 June 2026 (UTC)

Al-Bandari Mobarak Saud Abdullah (Arabic: البندري مبارك سعود عبدالله; born 9 December 2001) is a Saudi Arabian professional footballer who plays as a forward for Saudi Arabian club Al Hilal and the Saudi Arabia women's national team.

== Club career ==
Mobarak helped Al-Yamamah finish in third place in the 2021–22 Saudi Women's Football League.

== International career ==
Mobarak was part of the Saudi Arabia women's national team's first international game, in a friendly tournament in the Maldives in February 2022; she scored her team's first goal, in a 2–0 win over Seychelles on 20 February. On 24 February, Mobarak scored her first international brace, scoring both of Saudi Arabia's goals in a 2–0 win against the Maldives.

== Career statistics ==
=== Club ===
As of

Club	Season	Division	League		National cup		Total	
Club	Season	Division	Apps	Goals	Apps	Goals	Apps	Goals
Al Yamamah	2022–23	Saudi Women's Premier League	14	7			14	7
Al Shabab	2023–24	Saudi Women's Premier League	12	2			12	2
Al Shabab	2024–25	Saudi Women's Premier League	18	8	3	2	21	10
Al Shabab	Total		30	10	3	2	33	12
Al Hilal	2025–26	Saudi Women's Premier League	14	5	5	0	19	5
Al Hilal	2026-27	Saudi Women's Premier League	2	5	2	1	4	6
Total career			60	27	10	3	70	30

=== International ===
As of match played 12 January 2024

Appearances and goals by national team and year
National team	Year	Apps	Goals
Saudi Arabia	2022	4	5
Saudi Arabia	2023	8	1
Saudi Arabia	2024	2	4
Total		14	10

Scores and results list Saudi Arabia's goal tally first, score column indicates score after each Mobarak goal.

List of international goals scored by Al Bandari Mobarak
No.	Date	Venue	Opponent	Score	Result	Competition
1	20 February 2022	National Football Stadium, Malé, Maldives	Seychelles	1–0	2–0	Friendly
2	24 February 2022	National Football Stadium, Malé, Maldives	Maldives	1–0	2–0	Friendly
3	24 February 2022	National Football Stadium, Malé, Maldives	Maldives	2–0	2–0	Friendly
4	24 September 2022	Prince Sultan bin Abdul Aziz Stadium, Abha, Saudi Arabia	Bhutan	2–3	3–3	Friendly
5	28 September 2022	Prince Sultan bin Abdul Aziz Stadium, Abha, Saudi Arabia	Bhutan	2–4	2–4	Friendly
6	19 January 2023	Prince Sultan bin Abdul Aziz Stadium, Abha, Saudi Arabia	Pakistan	1–0	1–1	2023 SAFF Friendly Tournament
7	8 January 2024	King Abdullah Sports City, Jeddah, Saudi Arabia	Syria	1–0	2–0	Friendly
8	12 January 2024	King Abdullah Sports City, Jeddah, Saudi Arabia	Syria	1–0	3–0	Friendly
9	12 January 2024	King Abdullah Sports City, Jeddah, Saudi Arabia	Syria	2–0	3–0	Friendly
10	12 January 2024	King Abdullah Sports City, Jeddah, Saudi Arabia	Syria	3–0	3–0	Friendly
11	29 October 2024	Police Officers' Club Stadium, Dubai, United Arab Emirates	Laos	2–0	4–0	Friendly
12	29 October 2024	Police Officers' Club Stadium, Dubai, United Arab Emirates	Laos	3–0	4–0	Friendly
13	23 February 2025	King Abdullah Sports City, Jeddah, Saudi Arabia	Tajikistan	3–0	4–0	Friendly
14	26 February 2025	King Abdullah Sports City, Jeddah, Saudi Arabia	Tajikistan	3–0	3–0	Friendly
15	25 October 2025	321 Sports Stadium, Abu Dhabi, United Arab Emirates	Singapore	1–0	1–0	Friendly
16	28 November 2025	Hall Stadium – King Abdullah Sports City, Jeddah	United Arab Emirates	1–0	5–0	2025 WAFF Women's Championship
17	28 November 2025	Hall Stadium – King Abdullah Sports City, Jeddah	United Arab Emirates	2–0	5–0	2025 WAFF Women's Championship
18	2 December 2025	Prince Abdullah Al-Faisal Sports City Stadium, Jeddah, Saudi Arabia	Iraq	1–0	2–2 (2–4 p)	2025 WAFF Women's Championship
19	6 March 2026	Prince Saud bin Jalawi Sports City Stadium, Khobar, Saudi Arabia	Kyrgyzstan	1–0	3–0	Friendly
20	6 March 2026	Prince Saud bin Jalawi Sports City Stadium, Khobar, Saudi Arabia	Kyrgyzstan	2–0	3–0	Friendly
21	6 March 2026	Prince Saud bin Jalawi Sports City Stadium, Khobar, Saudi Arabia	Kyrgyzstan	3–0	3–0	Friendly
22	14 April 2026	Prince Sultan bin Abdul Aziz Stadium, Abha, Saudi Arabia	Egypt	1–0	1–2	Friendly
23	7 June 2026	Windmill Football Club Stadium, Bangkok, Thailand	Sri Lanka	1–0	4–0	Friendly
24	7 June 2026	Windmill Football Club Stadium, Bangkok, Thailand	Sri Lanka	4–0	4–0	Friendly
25	10 June 2026	Windmill Football Club Stadium, Bangkok, Thailand	Laos	3–0	4–0	Friendly
26	13 June 2026	Windmill Football Club Stadium, Bangkok, Thailand	Laos	1–0	5–1	Friendly
27	13 June 2026	Windmill Football Club Stadium, Bangkok, Thailand	Laos	2–0	5–1	Friendly
28	13 June 2026	Windmill Football Club Stadium, Bangkok, Thailand	Laos	3–1	5–1	Friendly

== See also ==
- List of top international women's football goal scorers by country
- List of Saudi Arabia women's international footballers
