= Mariam Al-Tamimi =

Saudi footballer (born 2004)

Personal information
- Full name: Mariam Yahya Mohammed Al-Tamimi
- Date of birth: 8 December 2004 (age 21)
- Place of birth: Saudi Arabia
- Position: Midfielder

Team information
- Current team: Al-Ula
- Number: 19

Senior career*
Years	Team	Apps	(Gls)
2022–2023	Eastern Flames	14	(2)
2023–2024	Al-Ittihad	5	(2)
2024-	Al-Ula	0	(0)

International career^{‡}
2022–	Saudi Arabia	8	(3)
2024–	Saudi Arabia U20	2	(2)
- * Club domestic league appearances and goals as of 30 December 2023 ‡ National team caps and goals as of 8 January 2024

Mariam Yahya Mohammed Al-Tamimi (Arabic: مَرْيَم يَحْيَى مُحَمَّد التَّمِيمِيّ; born 8 December 2004) is a Saudi footballer who plays as a midfielder for Al-Ittihad in the Saudi Women's Premier League (SWPL) and the Saudi Arabia national team.

== Club career ==
=== Eastern Flames FC ===
In October 2022, Al-Tamimi joined Eastern Flames FC for the 2022–23 Saudi Women's Premier League season. She led the team as captain, participated in all 14 matches, and scored 2 goals during the season.

=== Al-Ittihad Club ===
In April 2023, Al-Ittihad announced the signing of Al-Tamimi for two seasons up to 2025. On 23 August 2023, She made her debut for the club in the Jordanian-Saudi Women's Club Championship match against Al-Etihad.

=== Al-Ula ===
On 29 August 2024, Al-Ula signed a contract with Al-Tamimi, before the start of 2024–25 Saudi Women's Premier League.

== International career ==
Aged 17, Al-Tamimi was selected for the first Saudi Arabia women's national football team that flew to Maldives to play two friendlies, against Seychelles and the Maldives. On 20 February 2022, She started for the team in their 2–0 win against Seychelles, She scored her first international goal from the penalty spot in the 49th minute of the same match.

Receiving her first call for the national under-20 team in January 2024, On 6 March 2024, Al-Tamimi led the team in their first international game against Mauritania. She scored the third goal in the 71st minute, securing a 3–0 win.

== Career statistics ==
=== Club ===
As of match played 30 December 2023

Appearances and goals by club, season and competition
Club	Season	League			Cup		Total	
Club	Season	Division	Apps	Goals	Apps	Goals	Apps	Goals
Eastern Flames	2022–23	SWPL	14	2	—		14	2
Eastern Flames	Total		14	2	—		14	2
Al-Ittihad	2023–24	SWPL	5	2	0	0	5	2
Al-Ittihad	Total		6	2	0	0	6	2
Career total			19	3	0	0	20	4

=== International ===
As of match played 8 January 2024

Appearances and goals by national team and year
National team	Year	Apps	Goals
Saudi Arabia	2022	4	2
Saudi Arabia	2023	4	1
Saudi Arabia	2024	0	0
Total		8	3

Scores and results list Saudi Arabia's goal tally first, score column indicates score after each Al-Tamimi goal.

List of international goals scored by Mariam Al-Tamimi
No.	Date	Venue	Opponent	Score	Result	Competition
1	20 February 2022	Galolhu Rasmee Dhandu Stadium, Malé, Maldives	Seychelles	2–0	2–0	Friendly
2	28 September 2022	Prince Sultan bin Abdul Aziz Stadium, Abha, Saudi Arabia	Bhutan	1–2	2–4	Friendly
3	11 January 2023	Prince Saud bin Jalawi Stadium, Khobar, Saudi Arabia	Mauritius	1–0	1–0	2023 SAFF Women's International Friendly Tournament
