= Maria Khan =

Pakistani footballer (born 1990)

Personal information
- Full name: Maria Jamila Khan
- Date of birth: 9 November 1990 (age 35)
- Place of birth: Denver, Colorado, United States
- Position: Midfielder

Team information
- Current team: Kelana United
- Number: 10

College career
| Years | Team | Apps | (Gls) |
| 2009–2012 | Denver Pioneers | | |

Senior career*
| Years | Team | Apps | (Gls) |
| 2018–2019 | Royal Eagles | | |
| 2020–2021 | WAPDA | | |
| 2023–2025 | Eastern Flames | 26 | (3) |
| 2025 | Ho Chi Minh City | 0 | (0) |
| 2026– | Kelana United | 1 | (0) |

International career^{‡}
| 2021–2022 | United Arab Emirates | 6 | (1) |
| 2022– | Pakistan | 8 | (2) |
- * Club domestic league appearances and goals ‡ National team caps and goals as of 16:04, 15 February 2023 (UTC)

Maria Jamila Khan (Pashto; ماريه جميله خان) (born 9 November 1990) is a professional footballer who plays as a midfielder for Vietnamese club Ho Chi Minh City and captains the Pakistan women's national team. Born in the United States to a Pakistani-American father, she moved as an adult to the United Arab Emirates, and played friendlies for the United Arab Emirates national team, before pledging her international allegiance to her ancestral nation Pakistan.

== Club career ==
In 2009, Khan joined Denver Pioneers in the United States, where she was a goalkeeper. In 2013, Khan moved to the United Arab Emirates to pursue her master's degree. There, she transitioned into a midfielder for an amateur side where signed for an Emirati side, where she became a midfielder. It was there that she learnt more about women football in Pakistan, which eventually led her to play for WAPDA at the 2018 National Women Football Championship. In August 2023, she joined Saudi Women's Premier League club Eastern Flames.

== International career ==
In October 2020, Khan was one of the 30 players called up for the training camp of the Pakistan women's national team. In August 2022, she named as captain of the national team.

She received praises from all across Pakistan including Prime Minister of Pakistan Shehbaz Sharif for her goal against Saudi Arabia.

== International goals ==
| No. | Date | Venue | Opponent | Score | Result | Competition |
|---|---|---|---|---|---|---|
| 1. | 15 January 2023 | Prince Saud bin Jalawi Stadium, Khobar, Saudi Arabia | Mauritius | 1–1 | 1–2 | 2023 SAFF Women's Friendly Tournament |
| 2. | 19 January 2023 | Prince Saud bin Jalawi Stadium, Khobar, Saudi Arabia | Saudi Arabia | 1–1 | 1–1 | 2023 SAFF Women's Friendly Tournament |

== Personal life ==
Maria Jamila Khan is born into Pashtun family.

Khan is the niece of Jahangir Khan, who is widely considered to be the best squash player of all time, and the granddaughter of squash player Hashim Khan. She is an ethnic Pashtun. She is married to Omar Al Duri, a British fitness trainer of Iraqi-Saudi descent based in Dubai.
