= Noura Ibrahim =

Saudi Arabian footballer (born 1998)

Personal information
- Full name: Noura Abdulmohsen Ahmad Al-Brahim
- Date of birth: 17 September 1998 (age 28)
- Place of birth: Riyadh, Saudi Arabia
- Height: 1.59 m (5 ft 3 in)
- Position: Forward

Team information
- Current team: Al Qadsiah FC
- Number: 77

Senior career*
Years	Team	Apps	(Gls)
–2020	Challenge FC		
2020–2023	Al Yamamah	26	(16)
2023–2025	Al-Shabab	7	(0)

International career^{‡}
2019–	Saudi Arabia Futsal	16	(2)
2022–	Saudi Arabia	14	(3)
- * Club domestic league appearances and goals as of 30 December 2023 ‡ National team caps and goals as of 8 January 2024

Noura Abdulmohsen Ahmad Al-Brahim (Arabic: نُورَة عَبْد الْمُحْسِن أَحْمَد الْبَرَاهِيم; born 17 September 1998), better known as Noura Ibrahim, is a Saudi professional footballer who plays as a forward for Saudi Women's Premier League club Al Qadsiah FC and the Saudi Arabia women's national team.

== Club career ==
Ibrahim started playing football at the age of 10. In 2019 She was playing for the Riyadh-based team 'Challenge' before having a knee injury that sidelined her from playing for six months.

=== Al Yamamah (2020–2023) ===
In 2020, Noura joined Al Yamamah from the Challenge, On 26 November 2021, she scored her first competitive goal in the SAFF Women's Regional West Football Championship against the Challenge FC (now Al Hilal). Later on Ibrahim and Al Yamamah clinched bronze in the National Football Championship.

Ibrahim also played for Al Yamamah futsal team and was a part of the team squad that won the first Women's Futsal Tournament in the kingdom organized by the Saudi Arabian Football Federation.

=== Al-Shabab (2023–present) ===
Following Al-Shabab acquisition of Al Yamamah FC in April 2023. Ibrahim signed with Al-Shabab in August 2023. In August 2023, she made her debut for Al-Shabab on 14 October 2023, in the 2023–24 season away match against Al-Ahli.

== International career ==
In 2019, Ibrahim was a part of the first Saudi Futsal team that took the bronze in the 2019 GCC games. She was also included in the Saudi squad for the 2022 WAFF Women's Futsal Championship in Saudi Arabia, where the team reached the final.

In February 2022, Ibrahim was named for the first Saudi national senior football team to face Seychelles and the Maldives. She made her debut for the team on 20 February 2022 at the game against Seychelles. In September 2022, Ibrahim scored her first senior international goal in a contested 3–3 draw against Bhutan.

== Personal life ==
"When I was young my parents, mom passed away, and my dad passed away, so me and Al-Bandary grew up together in a house, like a compound. It's true I don't have family but I have ambition, I also have a life in front of me to live."

— Ibrahim on herself during the FIFA documentaryDestined to Play (2023).

Ibrahim lost her parents at a young age.

== Career statistics ==
=== Club ===
As of match played 30 December 2023

Appearances and goals by club, season and competition
Club	Season	League			Cup		Continental		Other		Total	
Club	Season	Division	Apps	Goals	Apps	Goals	Apps	Goals	Apps	Goals	Apps	Goals
Al Yamamah	2023–24	SWPL	14	2	—		—		—		14	2
Al Yamamah	Total		14	2	—		—		—		14	2
Al-Shabab	2023–24	SWPL	6	0	1	0	—		0	0	7	0
Al-Shabab	Total		6	0	1	0	—		0	0	7	0
Career total			20	2	1	0	—		0	0	21	2

=== International ===
As of match played 8 January 2024

Appearances and goals by national team and year
National team	Year	Apps	Goals
Saudi Arabia	2022	4	1
Saudi Arabia	2023	13	2
Saudi Arabia	2024	0	0
Total		14	3

==== International goals ====
No.	Date	Venue	Opponent	Score	Result	Competition
1.	24 September 2022	Prince Sultan bin Abdul Aziz Stadium, Abha, Saudi Arabia	Bhutan	3–3	3–3	Friendly
2.	15 January 2023	Prince Saud bin Jalawi Stadium, Khobar, Saudi Arabia	Comoros	1–0	2–0	2023 SAFF Women's International Friendly Tournament
3.	13 June 2023	Estadi Municipal De Peralada, Girona, Spain	Andorra	1–2	1–3	Friendly

== Honours ==
Saudi Arabia

- SAFF Women's International Friendly Tournament winner: Khobar 2023

Saudi Arabia futsal

- WAFF Women's Futsal Championship runners-up: 2022

Individual

- WAFF Women's Futsal Championship Best Player: 2022
