= Rosa Lappi-Seppälä =

Finnish head coach of the Saudi Arabia women's national football team

Personal information
- Date of birth: 4 November 1974 (age 52)
- Place of birth: Helsinki, Finland
- Position: Forward

Team information
- Current team: Como (assistant coach)

Youth career
- 1982–1986: KäPa
- 1987–1988: Valtti
- 1988–1989: HJK

Senior career*
| Years | Team | Apps | (Gls) |
| 1990–2000 | HJK | – | (–) |
| 1994–1995 | → Anderlecht | – | (–) |
| 1996–1997 | → Barry University | – | (–) |
| 1997–1998 | → Miami Gliders | – | (–) |
| 1999–2000 | → ACF Torino | 20 | (6) |
| 2000–2001 | → Foroni | 25 | (14) |
| 2001 | FC United | – | (–) |
| 2001–2002 | → Fiammamonza | 14 | (6) |
| 2002–2004 | HJK | – | (–) |
| 2002–2003 | → ACF Milan | – | (–) |
| 2005 | FC Espoo | – | (–) |
| 2006 | Åland United | – | (–) |
| 2007–2008 | PuiU | – | (–) |

International career
| 1995–2002 | Finland | 21 | (1) |

Managerial career
- 2012–2013: EIF
- 2014: KoiPS
- 2017: Finland U20
- 2018: Finland U-23
- 2019–2021: Honka
- 2023: Saudi Arabia
- 2024–: Como (assistant)
- * Club domestic league appearances and goals

Rosa Lappi-Seppälä (born 4 November 1974) is a Finnish former footballer and football manager who is the assistant coach of Como. Besides Finland, she has played in Nicaragua, Belgium, the United States, and Italy.

== Career ==
Lappi-Seppälä played in the Finnish women's premier division 1990–2009 for HJK, FC United, FC Espoo, Åland United and PuiU. During the winter periods she played in Belgium, the United States and Italy. Lappi-Seppälä earned 21 caps for the Finland women's national team.

In 2019–2021 Lappi-Seppälä was the head coach of FC Honka in the Finnish women's top division Kansallinen Liiga. In February 2023, she was appointed the manager of the Saudi Arabia women's national team.

== Club honors ==
- Finnish Women's Championship: 1991, 1992, 1995, 1996, 1997, 1998, 1999, 2000
- Finnish Women's Cup: 1991, 1992, 1993, 1998, 1999, 2000, 2001, 2002
- Belgian Women's Championship: 1995
- Cooppa Italia: 2001

== Family ==
Rosa LAppi-Seppälä's father is writer Jyrki Lappi-Seppälä. Her grandfather was the politician and architect Jussi Lappi-Seppälä.
