= Ameera Abualsamh =

Saudi soccer player (born 2005)

Personal information
- Date of birth: 2005 (age 20–21)
- Place of birth: Ottawa, Ontario, Canada
- Height: 5 ft 7 in (1.70 m)
- Positions: Midfielder; forward

Team information
- Current team: McMaster Marauders
- Number: 9

Youth career
- St. Anthony's Futuro

College career
Years	Team	Apps	(Gls)
2024–	McMaster Marauders	12	(2)

International career^{‡}
2024–2025	Saudi Arabia U20	7	(1)
2023–	Saudi Arabia	20	(5)
- ‡ National team caps and goals as of June 7, 2026

Ameera Abualsamh (Note: In Saudi Arabia, her full name is Ameera Ahmed R. Abu Al-Samh) (Arabic: أميرة أبو السمح; born 2005) is a Saudi soccer player who plays as a forward for U Sports team McMaster Marauders and the Saudi Arabia national football team.

== College career ==
Abualsamh is in her second season with the McMaster Marauders at McMaster University, and as of 9 July 2025, she has scored 2 goals in 12 appearances.

== International career ==
In June 2023, Abualsamh received her maiden call-up to the Saudi senior national team, joining the squad for their historic first friendly against European opposition Andorra. and on June 13, 2023, she went on to make her debut against the same side. She scored her first international goal on February 26, 2025, in a friendly match against Tajikistan. Abualsamh stands out as the only national team player based outside the Kingdom.

=== International goals ===
Scores and results list Saudi Arabia's goal tally first, score column indicates score after each Abualsamh goal.

List of international goals scored by Ameera Abualsamh
No.	Date	Venue	Opponent	Score	Result	Competition
1	February 26, 2025	Hall Stadium – King Abdullah Sports City, Jeddah, Saudi Arabia	Tajikistan	3–0	3–0	Friendly
2	November 24, 2025	Hall Stadium – King Abdullah Sports City, Jeddah, Saudi Arabia	Iraq	2–0	2–1	2025 WAFF Women's Championship
3	November 28, 2025	Hall Stadium – King Abdullah Sports City, Jeddah, Saudi Arabia	United Arab Emirates	5–0	5–0	2025 WAFF Women's Championship
4	June 7, 2026	Windmill Football Club Stadium, Bangkok, Thailand	Sri Lanka	2–0	4–0	Friendly
5	June 7, 2026	Windmill Football Club Stadium, Bangkok, Thailand	Sri Lanka	3–0	4–0	Friendly
