= Police Officers' Club Stadium =

Multi-use stadium in Dubai

Coordinates: 25°13′24″N 55°19′31″E

Police Officers Club Stadium (Arabic: ملعب نادي ضباط الشرطة), or Dubai Municipal Stadium, is a multi-use stadium in Dubai, United Arab Emirates. The stadium holds 7,500 people and is used mostly for football matches.

It has been formally used for two years by English College Dubai.

The stadium has hosted multiple national team friendly matches, hosting such teams as Bahrain, Angola, Syria, Ghana, Finland and others.
