= Saudi Arabia women's national football team =

Women's national association football team

Saudi Arabia
- Nickname(s): الصقور الخضر (The Green Falcons) الصقور العربية (The Arabian Falcons)
- Association: Saudi Arabian Football Federation (SAFF)
- Confederation: AFC (Asia)
- Sub-confederation: WAFF (West Asia)
- Head coach: Lluís Cortés
- Captain: Sara Al-Hamad
- Most caps: Lana Abdulrazak (44)
- Top scorer: Al-Bandari Mobarak (28)
- Home stadium: Various
- FIFA code: KSA
First colours	Second colours

FIFA ranking
- Current: 157 (20 October 2026)
- Highest: 157 (June 2026)
- Lowest: 175 (December 2023 – June 2024)

First international
- Saudi Arabia 2–0 Seychelles (Malé, Maldives, 20 February 2022)

Biggest win
- Singapore 0–5 Saudi Arabia (Abu Dhabi, United Arab Emirates; 29 October 2025); Saudi Arabia 5–0 United Arab Emirates (Jeddah, Saudi Arabia; 28 November 2025)

Biggest defeat
- Andorra 3–0 Saudi Arabia (Girona, Spain, 17 June 2023); Philippines 3–0 Saudi Arabia (Phnom Penh, Cambodia; 29 June 2025)

WAFF Championship
- Appearances: 2 (first in 2024)
- Best result: 4th place (2025)

The Saudi Arabia women's national football team represents Saudi Arabia in international women's association football. The team is governed by the Saudi Arabian Football Federation (SAFF), the governing body for football in Saudi Arabia.

== History ==
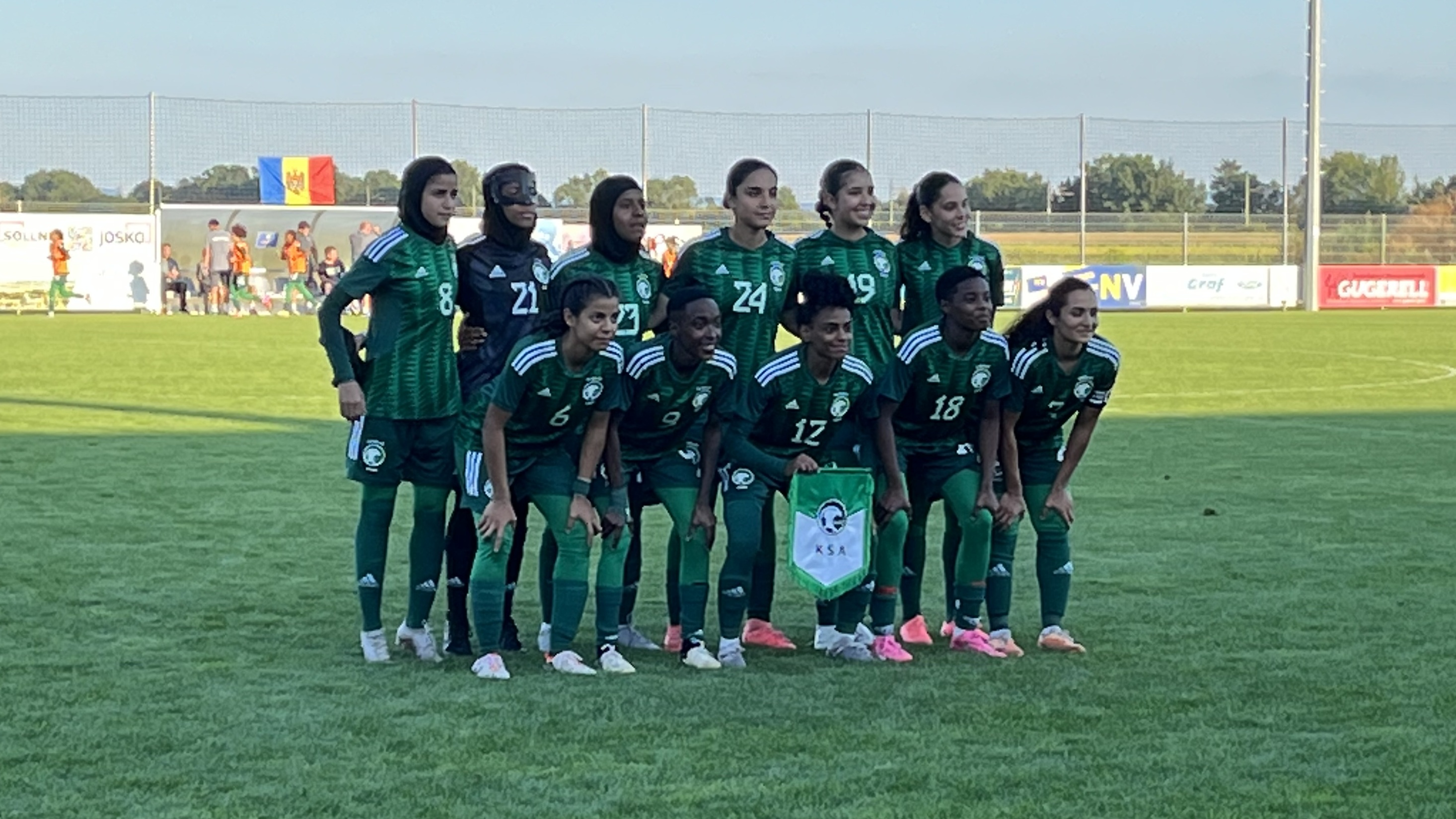
Saudi Arabia women's national football team against Moldova in Kirchberg am Wagram, Austria (2024)

=== Background ===
Due to the influence of religious leaders in Saudi Arabia, active opposition of political leaders and sport administrators, and systematic discrimination against women's sport, a women's national team could not exist for a long time. The creation of a FIFA-recognised women's national team was banned by law in 2008. Systemic discrimination remained intact despite limited reforms, until the death of King Abdullah in 2015.

With King Salman's ascension to the throne in 2015, talks about football reforms escalated. However, his son Mohammed bin Salman was the first to spearhead the reforms, including to women's football. Saudi Arabia allowed women to attend football games since 2017, the first step for a future creation of a women's football team.

In December 2019, the Saudi Arabian Football Federation (SAFF) organised the first unofficial women's competition in the Jeddah area. An official nationwide tournament, the amateur Saudi Women's Football League, was launched in February 2020, concentrated in three big cities: Riyadh, Jeddah, and Dammam. Following the creation of the league, calls for a creation of a women's national team increased.

=== Inception ===
On 11 August 2021, the SAFF appointed Monika Staab as head coach and Sandra Kälin as co-coach of the newly established women's national team. Saudi Arabia played their first games in February 2022, taking part in a friendly tournament in Malé, Maldives. They debuted on 20 February, beating Seychelles in a 2–0 win. Following the successful debut, Lamia Bin Bahian, a board member of the SAFF, revealed a long-term plan to allow the team to participate in the first FIFA Women's World Cup in the next ten years, with the aim to become a dominant force in both regional and continental levels.

== Results and fixtures ==
The following is a list of match results in the last 12 months, as well as any future matches that have been scheduled.

Legend

Win Draw Lose Fixture

=== 2025 ===
25 October 2025 Friendly	Singapore	0–1	Saudi Arabia	Abu Dhabi, United Arab Emirates
19:00 UTC+3			Mobarak 80'	Stadium: 321 Sports Stadium

29 October 2025 Friendly	Singapore	0–5	Saudi Arabia	Abu Dhabi, United Arab Emirates
19:00 UTC+3			Mukhayzin 22' (pen.); Mansour 56'; Al-Enezi 59'; Abdulrazak 82' (pen.); Ibrahim 84'	Stadium: 321 Sports Stadium

24 November 2025 2025 WAFF Championship GS	Iraq	1–2	Saudi Arabia	Jeddah, Saudi Arabia
19:45 UTC+3	Al-Jawahiri 90+7'	Report	Mukhayzin 41' (pen.); Abu Al-Samh 90+5'	Stadium: Hall Stadium – King Abdullah Sports City; Referee: Esraa Al-Mbaiden (Jordan)

28 November 2025 2025 WAFF Championship GS	Saudi Arabia	5–0	United Arab Emirates	Jeddah, Saudi Arabia
19:45 UTC+3	Abdullah 3', 10'; Abdulrazak 26'; Khalid 28'; Abu Al-Samh 43'	Report		Stadium: Hall Stadium – King Abdullah Sports City; Referee: Mohammed Al-Manii (Oman)

30 November 2025 2025 WAFF Championship SF	Saudi Arabia	0–0 (3–4 p)	Palestine	Jeddah, Saudi Arabia
19:45 UTC+3		Report		Stadium: Hall Stadium – King Abdullah Sports City; Attendance: 610; Referee: Said Al-Mezeini (Oman)
	Penalties
	Mukhayzin (penalty scored); Abdulrazak (penalty scored); Ibrahim (penalty missed); Tawfiq (penalty missed); Al-Omaysi (penalty scored)		(penalty scored) Youssef; (penalty scored) Asad-Halim; (penalty missed) Osorio; (penalty scored) Sabat; (penalty scored) Nasr

2 December 2025 2025 WAFF Championship 3rd	Saudi Arabia	2–2 (2–4 p)	Iraq	Jeddah, Saudi Arabia
16:45 UTC+3	Abdullah 17'; Abdulrazak 62'	Report	Salihi 41'; Al-Balahi 53'	Stadium: Al-Faisal Stadium; Referee: Mohammed Al-Manii (Oman)
	Penalties
	Mukhayzin (penalty missed); Abdulrazak (penalty scored); Hanafi (penalty missed); Tawfiq (penalty scored)		(penalty scored) Al-Ghazawi; (penalty scored) Al-Balahi; (penalty scored) Abuzer; (penalty scored) Al-Jawahiri

=== 2026 ===
26 February 2026 Friendly	Bahrain	0–3	Saudi Arabia	Manama, Bahrain
21:00 UTC+3		Report	Tawfiq 55'; Khalid 57'; Al-Omaysi 79'	Stadium: Al Ahli Stadium

2 March 2026 Friendly	Saudi Arabia	2–0	Kyrgyzstan	Khobar, Saudi Arabia
22:00 UTC+3	Mukhayzin 8'; Khalid 35'	Report		Stadium: Prince Saud bin Jalawi Sports City Stadium

6 March 2026 Friendly	Saudi Arabia	3–0	Kyrgyzstan	Khobar, Saudi Arabia
22:00 UTC+3	Abdullah 22', 28', 53'	Report		Stadium: Prince Saud bin Jalawi Sports City Stadium

10 April 2026 Friendly	Saudi Arabia	1–1	Botswana	Abha, Saudi Arabia
19:00 UTC+3	Tawfiq 90+5'	Report	Moloi 28'	Stadium: Prince Sultan bin Abdulaziz Sports City Stadium; Referee: Husain Al-Showaikh (Bahrain)

14 April 2026 Friendly	Saudi Arabia	1–2	Egypt	Abha, Saudi Arabia
19:00 UTC+3	Abdullah 38'	Report	Ghazi 59'; El Sayed 73'; El Mitwalli (yellow card) (yellow-red card) 90+7'	Stadium: Prince Sultan bin Abdulaziz Sports City Stadium; Referee: Husain Al-Showaikh (Bahrain); Assistant referees: Ahmed Al-Ghareeb (Bahrain); Husain Jaafar (Bahrain); Fourth official: Kalthoum Hantoul (Saudi Arabia)

18 April 2026 Friendly	Saudi Arabia	0–2	Egypt	Abha, Saudi Arabia
19:00 UTC+3			Ghazi 45+2' (pen.); El Sayed 90+4'	Referee: Mohammed Al-Manii (Oman)

7 June 2026 Friendly	Saudi Arabia	4–0	Sri Lanka	Bangkok, Thailand
19:00 UTC+7	Abdullah 24', 37'; Abu-Alsamh 26', 27'			Stadium: Windmill Football Club Stadium

10 June 2026 Friendly	Saudi Arabia	4–0	Laos	Bangkok, Thailand
19:00 UTC+7	Al-Yahya 6'; Al-Omaysi 45+2', 70'; Abdullah 52'	Report		Stadium: Windmill Football Club Stadium; Referee: Supiree Testhomya (Thailand)

13 June 2026 Friendly	Saudi Arabia	5–1	Laos	Bangkok, Thailand
19:00 UTC+7	Abdullah 15', 52', 73'; Al-Saiari 75'; Balkhudher 77'		Chanthithong 71'	Stadium: Windmill Football Club Stadium

9 October Friendly	Saudi Arabia	2–0	Malaysia	Doha, Qatar
19:00 UTC+3	Tawfiq 87'; Al-Saiari 90'	Report		Stadium: Aspire Academy Stadium

13 October Friendly	Saudi Arabia	0–1	Malaysia	Doha, Qatar
19:00 UTC+3		Report	Mahrt 5'	Stadium: Aspire Academy Stadium

== Head-to-head record ==
Key

Positive balance (more wins than losses)
Neutral balance (as many wins as losses)
Negative balance (more losses than wins)

The following table shows Saudi Arabia's all-time official international record per opponent:

Opponent	Pld	W	D	L	GF	GA	GD	W%	Confederation
Andorra	2	0	0	2	1	6	–5	0	UEFA
Bahrain	2	2	0	0	4	0	+4	100	AFC
Bhutan	3	0	1	2	5	8	–3	0	AFC
Botswana	1	0	1	0	1	1	0	0	CAF
Cambodia	1	0	0	1	1	2	–1	0	AFC
Comoros	1	1	0	0	2	0	+2	100	CAF
Egypt	2	0	0	2	1	4	–3	0	CAF
Guam	1	0	0	1	0	2	–2	0	AFC
Hong Kong	2	0	0	2	1	3	–2	0	AFC
Indonesia	3	0	1	2	1	3	–2	0	AFC
Iraq	2	1	1	0	4	3	+1	50	AFC
Jordan	1	0	0	1	1	3	–2	0	AFC
Kyrgyzstan	2	2	0	0	5	0	+5	100	AFC
Laos	3	3	0	0	13	1	+12	100	AFC
Lebanon	1	0	0	1	2	3	–1	0	AFC
Malaysia	5	1	2	2	2	2	0	20	AFC
Maldives	1	1	0	0	2	0	+2	100	AFC
Mauritius	1	1	0	0	1	0	+1	100	CAF
Moldova	2	0	0	2	0	2	–2	0	UEFA
Pakistan	3	1	2	0	3	2	+1	33.33	AFC
Palestine	5	1	3	1	3	2	+1	20	AFC
Philippines	1	0	0	1	0	3	–3	0	AFC
Seychelles	1	1	0	0	2	0	+2	100	CAF
Singapore	2	2	0	0	6	0	+6	100	AFC
Sri Lanka	2	2	0	0	6	0	+6	100	AFC
Syria	2	2	0	0	5	0	+5	100	AFC
Tajikistan	2	2	0	0	7	0	+7	100	AFC
United Arab Emirates	1	1	0	0	5	0	+5	100	AFC
Total	55	24	11	20	84	50	+34	43.63	—

Last updated: Saudi Arabia vs Malaysia, 13 October 2026.

== Coaching staff ==
=== Current coaching staff ===
As of 11 February 2023

Position	Name
Head coach	(Spain) Lluís Cortés
Assistant coach	(Saudi Arabia) Ahod Al-Amari (Slovakia) Martin Pacholek (Switzerland) Sandra Kälin
Goalkeeping coach	(Germany) Kathrin Längert
Team administrator	(Saudi Arabia) Dalia Al-Obeikan (Saudi Arabia) Intisar Al-Qahtan
Video analyst	(Australia) Donna Newberry
Team manager	(Saudi Arabia) Beren Sadaqa

=== Manager history ===
- (Germany) Monika Staab (11 August 2021 – 13 February 2023)
- (Finland) Rosa Lappi-Seppälä (13 February 2023 – 24 October 2023)
- (Spain) Lluís Cortés (11 December 2023 – present)

== Players ==
=== Current squad ===
The following players were called up for the 2025 WAFF Women's Championship, to be held from 24 November to 2 December 2025.

Caps and goals are partially correct only for Al Bandari Mobarak as of 13 June 2026, after the match against Laos; for Seba Tawfiq as of 26 February 2026, after the match against Bahrain; and for the 3 following players (Lana Abdulrazak, Raghad Mukhayzin and Farida Hanafi) as of 2 December 2025, after the match against Iraq; for all other players caps and goals are correct as of 30 November 2025, after the match against Palestine.

No.	Pos.	Player	Date of birth (age)	Caps	Goals	Club
1	GK	Sara Khalid	2 August 1996 (age 30)	18	0	(Saudi Arabian Football Federation) Al-Qadsiah
21	GK	Mona Abdulrahman	27 October 1996 (age 30)	22	0	(Saudi Arabian Football Federation) Al-Nassr
22	GK	Laila Al-Qahtani	25 September 2000 (age 26)	4	0	(Saudi Arabian Football Federation) Al-Hilal
2	DF	Bayan Sadagah	15 November 1994 (age 32)	39	1	(Saudi Arabian Football Federation) Al-Ittihad
3	DF	Nouf Saud	7 November 2000 (age 26)	16	0	(Saudi Arabian Football Federation) Al-Hilal
8	DF	Sara Al-Hamad (Captain)	27 June 1992 (age 34)	41	0	(Saudi Arabian Football Federation) Al Nassr
12	DF	Shuruq Al-Hwsawi	15 November 1994 (age 32)	20	0	(Saudi Arabian Football Federation) Al Nassr
13	DF	Aseel Ahmed	25 March 1996 (age 30)	15	0	(Saudi Arabian Football Federation) Al-Nassr
16	DF	Hala Khashoggi	11 October 1999 (age 27)	8	0	(Saudi Arabian Football Federation) Al-Ittihad
19	DF	Farida Hanafi	7 December 2005 (age 20)	8	0	(Saudi Arabian Football Federation) Al-Ahli
23	DF	Raghad Mukhayzin	24 October 1996 (age 30)	43	5	(Saudi Arabian Football Federation) Al-Qadsiah
5	MF	Lana Abdulrazak	22 May 2005 (age 21)	44	5	(Saudi Arabian Football Federation) Al-Ittihad
6	MF	Noura Ibrahim	17 September 1998 (age 28)	21	4	(Saudi Arabian Football Federation) Al-Qadsiah
10	MF	Seba Tawfiq	13 January 2005 (age 21)	33	9	(Saudi Arabian Football Federation) Al-Ittihad
11	MF	Fatimah Mansour	10 December 2007 (age 18)	30	1	(Saudi Arabian Football Federation) Al-Hilal
14	MF	Majd Al-Otaibi	4 December 2006 (age 19)	2	0	(Saudi Arabian Football Federation) Al-Ula
15	MF	Moudi Abdulmohsen	20 September 2001 (age 25)	17	2	(Saudi Arabian Football Federation) Al-Hilal
18	MF	Al-Adda Fahad	13 March 1996 (age 30)	16	1	(Saudi Arabian Football Federation) Al-Hilal
24	MF	Basmah Al-Shnaifi	23 April 2009 (age 17)	9	0	(Saudi Arabian Football Federation) Al-Nassr
4	FW	Safa Zedadka	11 February 2000 (age 26)	8	0	(Saudi Arabian Football Federation) Al-Ula
7	FW	Mubarkh Al-Saiari	19 December 1998 (age 27)	21	0	(Saudi Arabian Football Federation) Al-Nassr
9	FW	Al Bandari Mobarak	9 December 2001 (age 24)	40	28	(Saudi Arabian Football Federation) Al-Hilal
17	FW	Fadwa Khaled	25 January 2005 (age 21)	19	1	(Saudi Arabian Football Federation) Al-Ahli
20	FW	Ameera Abualsamh	2005 (age 20–21)	17	3	(Canadian Soccer Association) McMaster Marauders
25	FW	Lamar Balkhudher	25 December 2007 (age 18)	5	0	(Saudi Arabian Football Federation) Al-Ittihad
26	MF	Maram Al-Yahya	25 January 2009 (age 17)	10	0	(Saudi Arabian Football Federation) Al-Qadsiah

=== Recent call-ups ===
The following players have also been called up to the Saudi Arabia squad within the last 12 months.

Pos.	Player	Date of birth (age)	Caps	Goals	Club	Latest call-up
^{INJ} Player withdrew from the squad due to an injury.^{PRE} Preliminary squad.^{SUS} Player is serving a suspension.^{WD} Player withdrew for personal reasons.

== Records ==
- Active players in **bold**, statistics correct as of 23 February 2024.

=== Most-capped players ===
#	Player	Year(s)	Caps	Goals
1	Bayan Sadagah	2022–present	22	1
1	Lana Abdulrazak	2022–present	22	2
1	Sara Hamad	2022–present	22	0
4	Raghad Mukhayzin	2022–present	21	0
5	Joury Tarek	2022–present	17	0
5	Noura Ibrahim	2022–present	17	3
5	Al Bandari Mobarak	2022–present	17	10
8	Talah Al-Ghamdi	2023–present	16	0
9	Fatimah Mansour	2022–present	15	0
9	Leen Mohammed	2022–present	15	2

=== Top goalscorers ===
#	Player	Year(s)	Goals	Caps
1	Al Bandari Mobarak	2022–present	15	17
2	Noura Ibrahim	2022–present	4	17
2	Mariam Al-Tamimi	2022–present	3	8
4	Bayan Sadagah	2022–present	1	22
4	Lana Abdulrazak	2022–present	5	22
4	Leen Mohammed	2022–present	2	15
4	Al Bandari Al-Hwsawi	2022–present	1	11
4	Seba Tawfiq	2022–present	10	12
4	Daliah Abu Laban	2022–present	1	6

== Competitive record ==
So far, the team hasn't competed in the FIFA Women's World Cup, the Olympic Games, the Arab Women's Cup or the AFC Women's Asian Cup, but have competed in the WAFF Women's Championship twice in 2024 and 2025 where they were each time hosts. They also haven't competed at the Asian Games yet, but as hosts for the 2034 edition they're automatically qualified.

=== FIFA Women's World Cup ===
FIFA Women's World Cup record
Hosts / Year	Result	GP	W	D*	L	GS	GA	GD
(China) 1991	Team not established							
(Sweden) 1995	Team not established							
(United States) 1999	Team not established							
(United States) 2003	Team not established							
(China) 2007	Team not established							
(Germany) 2011	Team not established							
(Canada) 2015	Team not established							
(France) 2019	Team not established							
(Australia) (New Zealand) 2023	Did not enter							
(Brazil) 2027	Did not qualify							
(Costa Rica) (Jamaica) (Mexico) (United States) 2031	TBD							
(United Kingdom) 2035	TBD							
Total	0/12	—	—	—	—	—	—	—

*Draws include knockout matches decided on penalty kicks.

=== Olympic Games ===
Summer Olympics record
Hosts / Year	Result	GP	W	D*	L	GS	GA	GD
(United States) 1996	Team not established							
(Australia) 2000	Team not established							
(Greece) 2004	Team not established							
(China) 2008	Team not established							
(United Kingdom) 2012	Team not established							
(Brazil) 2016	Team not established							
(Japan) 2020	Team not established							
(France) 2024	Did not enter							
(United States) 2028	Did not qualify							
(Australia) 2032	TBD							
Total	0/10	—	—	—	—	—	—	—

*Draws include knockout matches decided on penalty kicks.

=== Arab Women's Cup ===
Arab Women's Cup record
Hosts / Year	Result	GP	W	D*	L	GS	GA	GD
(Egypt) 2006	Team not established							
(Egypt) 2021	Team not established							
(Morocco) 2027	TBD							
Total	0/2	—	—	—	—	—	—	—

=== WAFF Women's Championship ===
WAFF Women's Championship record
Hosts / Year	Result	GP	W	D*	L	GS	GA	GD
(Jordan) 2005	Team not established							
(Jordan) 2007	Team not established							
(United Arab Emirates) 2010	Team not established							
(United Arab Emirates) 2011	Team not established							
(Jordan) 2014	Team not established							
(Bahrain) 2019	Team not established							
(Jordan) 2022	Did not enter							
(Saudi Arabia) 2024	Group stage	3	0	0	3	3	8	−5
(Saudi Arabia) 2025	4th place	4	2	2	0	9	3	+6
Total	2/9	7	2	2	3	12	11	+1

=== AFC Women's Asian Cup ===
AFC Women's Asian Cup record
Hosts / Year	Result	GP	W	D*	L	GS	GA	GD
(British Hong Kong) 1975	Team not established							
(Taiwan) 1977	Team not established							
(India) 1980	Team not established							
(British Hong Kong) 1981	Team not established							
(Thailand) 1983	Team not established							
(British Hong Kong) 1986	Team not established							
(British Hong Kong) 1989	Team not established							
(Japan) 1991	Team not established							
(Malaysia) 1993	Team not established							
(Malaysia) 1995	Team not established							
(China) 1997	Team not established							
(Philippines) 1999	Team not established							
(Taiwan) 2001	Team not established							
(Thailand) 2003	Team not established							
(Australia) 2006	Team not established							
(Vietnam) 2008	Team not established							
(China) 2010	Team not established							
(Vietnam) 2014	Team not established							
(Jordan) 2018	Team not established							
(India) 2022	Did not enter							
(Australia) 2026	Did not qualify							
(Uzbekistan) 2029	TBD							
Total	0/22	0	0	0	0	0	0	0

=== Asian Games ===
Asian Games record
Hosts / Year	Result	GP	W	D*	L	GS	GA	GD
(China) 1990	Team not established							
(Japan) 1994	Team not established							
1998	Team not established							
(South Korea) 2002	Team not established							
(Qatar) 2006	Team not established							
(China) 2010	Team not established							
(South Korea) 2014	Team not established							
(Indonesia) 2018	Team not established							
(China) 2022	Did not enter							
(Japan) 2026	TBD							
(Qatar) 2030	TBD							
(Saudi Arabia) 2034	Qualified as host							
Total	0/10	—	—	—	—	—	—	—

*Draws include knockout matches decided on penalty kicks.

== See also ==
- Saudi Arabia women's national football team results
- Saudi Arabia women's national under-20 football team
- Saudi Arabia women's national under-17 football team
