= Al-Ittihad Club (women) =

Ittihad Women
- Full name: Al-Ittihad Saudi Women Club
- Nicknames: (Al-Numoor) The Tigers; (Amid Al-Andiyah) The Chief of Clubs
- Founded: 2014 (as Jeddah Eagles); 2022 (as Al-Ittihad)
- Ground: Al-Ittihad Club Stadium, Jeddah
- Capacity: 15,000
- Owner(s): Public Investment Fund (75%); Al-Ittihad Non-Profit Foundation (25%)
- Head coach: Raúl Pérez
- League: Saudi Women's Premier League
- 2024–25: SWPL, 7th of 8
- Website: ittihadclub.sa
Home colours	Away colours	Third colours

Ittihad Women Football Club is a Saudi professional women's football club based in Jeddah.

Founded in 2014 as an independent club, Jeddah Eagles FC at the time were acquired in 2022 by Ittihad. They currently compete in the Saudi Women's Premier League, the first level of the Saudi football pyramid.

== History ==
Founded in 2014, Jeddah Eagles Ladies Football Club participated in the first Women's Community Football League 2020–21 season after they won the regional Jeddah tournament.

On 25 September 2022, the club was bought by men's club Ittihad. The club became fully professional in the process.

== Players ==
=== Current squad ===
As of 17 September 2025

Note: Flags indicate national team as defined under FIFA eligibility rules; some limited exceptions apply. Players may hold more than one non-FIFA nationality.

No.	Pos.	Nation	Player
1	GK	SLO	Zala Meršnik
2	DF	KSA	Bayan Sadagah
4	DF	KSA	Talah Al-Ghamdi
6	MF	KSA	Lana Abdulrazak
7	MF	KSA	Lamar Mohammad
8	MF	ESP	María Díaz Cirauqui
9	FW	BRA	Letícia Nunes
10	MF	KSA	Seba Tawfiq
11	DF	KSA	Hala Khashoggi
13	FW	KSA	Marya Baghaffar

No.	Pos.	Nation	Player
16	DF	KSA	Nada Al-Ghamdi
17	FW	NGR	Francisca Ordega
18	MF	KSA	Layan Jouhari
21	GK	KSA	Hessa Al-Sudairy
22	DF	NGR	Ashleigh Plumptre
34	GK	KSA	Louloua Moussa
47	MF	KSA	Retaj Al-Thobaiti
80	FW	KSA	Miral Daghistani
90	MF	KSA	Layan Al-Yafei
93	MF	ALG	Lina Boussaha

== Staff ==
Position	Staff
Head coach	(Spain) Raúl Pérez
Assistant coach	(Brazil) Conrad Pianche
Goalkeeping coach	(Brazil) Feernanod Resende
Strength and conditioning coach	(South Africa) Simone Conley
Data analyst	(Spain) Antoine Clare
Video Analyst	(France) Cedric Tafforeau
Medical Team	(Portugal) Sergio Gomez
Medical Team	(Algeria) Ali Yagdah
Lead Physiotherapist	(Greece) Maria Stergiou
Physiotherapist	(Spain) Iván López
Nutritionist	(Portugal) Vitor Teixeira
General manager	(Jordan) Haya Al-Jamal

== See also ==
- Ittihad
- Saudi Women's Premier League
- Al-Ittihad Club (Jeddah)
- Al-Ittihad Jeddah (basketball)
