= SAFF Women's International Friendly Tournament =

Annual invitational international women's football tournament held in Saudi Arabia

- Organiser(s): Saudi Arabian Football Federation (SAFF)
- Founded: 2023; 3 years ago
- Region: Saudi Arabia
- Teams: 6
- Current champions: Lebanon (1st title)
- Most championships: Lebanon; Saudi Arabia (1 title each)
- Website: Official website
- 2023 Tournament (Taif)

The SAFF Women's International Friendly Tournament is an invitational women's football tournament held in Saudi Arabia. The first edition (2023, Khobar) was contested by Comoros, Mauritius, Pakistan and hosts Saudi Arabia.

== Results ==
Year	Winner	Runner-up	Third place	Fourth place
2023 (Khobar)	Saudi Arabia	Pakistan	Mauritius	Comoros
2023 (Taif)	Lebanon	Bhutan	Malaysia	Saudi Arabia

=== Participating nations ===
Team	2023 (Khobar)	2023 (Taif)	Total
Bhutan		2nd	1
Comoros	4th		1
Laos		6th	1
Lebanon		1st	1
Malaysia		3rd	1
Mauritius	3rd		1
Pakistan	2nd	5th	2
Saudi Arabia	1st	4th	2
Total	4	6	10

=== Top goalscorers ===
As of 8 October 2023

Rank	Name	Total

== See also ==
- Saudi Arabian Football Federation (SAFF)
- Football in Saudi Arabia
- Women's football in Saudi Arabia
