= 2023 SAFF Women's International Friendly Tournament (Khobar) =

البطولة الودية الدولية للسيدات - السعودية 2023

Tournament details
- Host country: Saudi Arabia
- City: Khobar
- Dates: 11–19 January
- Teams: 4 (from 2 confederations)
- Venue: 1 (in 1 host city)

Final positions
- Champions: Saudi Arabia (1st title)
- Runners-up: Pakistan
- Third place: Mauritius
- Fourth place: Comoros

Tournament statistics
- Matches played: 6
- Goals scored: 12 (2 per match)
- Top scorer(s): (Comoros) Anlaouia Hadhirami Ali (2 Goals)
- Best player: (Pakistan) Maria Khan
- Best goalkeeper: (Saudi Arabia) Sara Khalid

The 2023 SAFF Women's International Friendly Tournament was the first edition of the SAFF Women's International Friendly Tournament, an invitational women's football tournament held in Saudi Arabia from 11 to 19 January 2023. It consisted of a single match round-robin tournament. It featured four teams, Namely Comoros, Mauritius, Pakistan and hosts Saudi Arabia.

== Format ==
The four invited teams played a round-robin tournament. Points awarded in the group stage followed the formula of three points for a win, one point for a draw, and zero points for a loss. In the event two teams were tied in points, tie-breakers would be applied in the order of goal difference, goals scored, head-to-head result, and a fair play score based on the number of yellow and red cards.

== Venue ==
The stadium chosen by SAFF to host the 2023 SAFF Women's International Friendly Tournament is located in Khobar a city in the Eastern Province.

Khobar
Prince Saud bin Jalawi Stadium
Capacity: 15,000
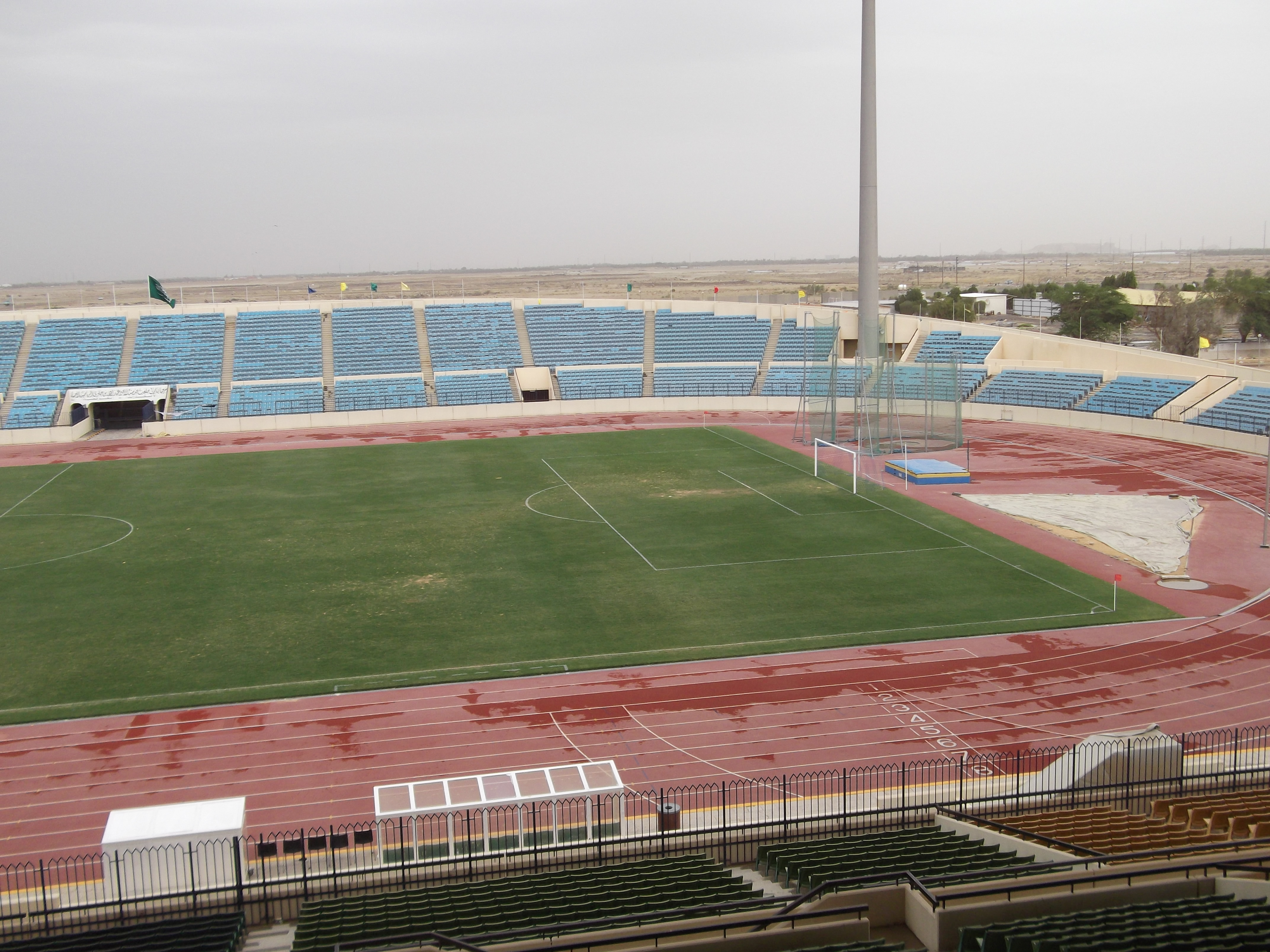

== Teams ==
The following four teams participated in the tournament:

Team	Confederation	Appearance	FIFA ranking (December 2022)
Comoros	CAF	1st	182
Mauritius	CAF	1st	187
Pakistan	AFC	1st	160
Saudi Arabia	AFC	1st	NR

== Match officials ==
The following official were appointed by SAFF to officiate the tournament:

Referees

- (Egypt) Shahenda Saad Ali ElMaghrabi
- (Saudi Arabia) Anoud Alasmari
- (Uzbekistan) Edita Mirabidova

Assistant referees

- (Egypt) Yara Abdelfattah
- (Jordan) Heba Saadieh
- (Uzbekistan) Kristina Sereda

== Standings ==
Pos	Team	Pld	W	D	L	GF	GA	GD	Pts
1st place, gold medalist(s)	Saudi Arabia (H)	3	2	1	0	4	1	+3	7
2nd place, silver medalist(s)	Pakistan	3	1	1	1	3	3	0	4
3rd place, bronze medalist(s)	Mauritius	3	1	0	2	3	4	−1	3
4	Comoros	3	1	0	2	2	4	−2	3

Source: SAFF
Rules for classification: 1) points; 2) goal difference; 3) goals scored; 4) head-to-head result; 5) fair play ranking.
(H) Hosts

== Results ==
All times are local, SAST (UTC+3:00).

11 January 2023
16:30

Pakistan	1–0	Comoros
Anmol 89'	Report

Prince Saud bin Jalawi Stadium, Khobar
Referee: Anoud Alasmari (Saudi Arabia)
11 January 2023
20:30

Saudi Arabia	1–0	Mauritius
Al-Tamimi 44' (pen.)	Report

Prince Saud bin Jalawi Stadium, Khobar
Referee: Shahenda Saad Ali ElMaghrabi (Egypt)
15 January 2023
16:30

Mauritius	2–1	Pakistan
Jheemla 4'; Gopal 64'	Report	M. Khan 9'

Prince Saud bin Jalawi Stadium, Khobar
Referee: Edita Mirabidova (Uzbekistan)
15 January 2023
20:30

Comoros	0–2	Saudi Arabia
	Report	Ibrahim 35'; Abu Laban 90+1'

Prince Saud bin Jalawi Stadium, Khobar
Referee: Shahenda Saad Ali ElMaghrabi (Egypt)
19 January 2023
16:30

Comoros	2–1	Mauritius
Hadhirami Ali 19', 31'	Report	Verloppe 63'

Prince Saud bin Jalawi Stadium, Khobar
19 January 2023
20:30

Saudi Arabia	1–1	Pakistan
Mobarak 28'	Report	M. Khan 64'

Prince Saud bin Jalawi Stadium, Khobar

== Statistics ==
=== Goalscorers ===
As of 15 January 2023

There were 7 goals scored in 4 matches, for an average of 1.75 goals per match.

1 goal

- (Mauritius) Brooklyn Jheemla
- (Mauritius) Julie Gopal
- (Pakistan) Anmol Hira
- (Pakistan) Maria Khan
- (Saudi Arabia) Mariam Al-Tamimi
- (Saudi Arabia) Noura Ibrahim
- (Saudi Arabia) Daliah Abu Laban

Source: SAFF

=== Discipline ===
In the tournament, a player will be suspended for the subsequent match in the competition for either getting red card or accumulating two yellow cards in two different matches.

== Media coverage ==
2023 SAFF Women's International Friendly Tournament broadcasters in Participating countries
Country	Broadcast network	Television	Radio	Live streaming
Saudi Arabia	SSC	SSC Sport	—	SSC Sport 1
2023 SAFF Women's International Friendly Tournament international broadcasters
Rest of world	Eleven Sports	—	—	2023 SAFF Women's International Friendly Tournament
Rest of world	FIFA+	—	—	2023 SAFF Women's International Friendly Tournament
