= 2023–24 Saudi Women's Cup =

2023–24 SAFF Women's Cup
Tournament details
- Country: Saudi Arabia
- Dates: 23 November 2023 – 28 March 2024
- Teams: 16

Final positions
- Champions: Al-Ahli (1st title)
- Runners-up: Al-Shabab
- Third place: Al-Qadsiah

Tournament statistics
- Matches played: 16
- Goals scored: 108 (6.75 per match)
- Top goal scorer(s): (Morocco) Ibtissam Jraïdi (AHL) (14 goals)

Awards
- Best player: (Ghana) Alice Kusi (AHL)
- Best goalkeeper: (United States) Lindsey Harris (QDS)
- Goals scored in penalty shoot-outs not included.

The 2023–24 SAFF Women's Cup was the inaugural season of the annual Saudi women's football cup competition. Sixteen teams participated in the competition, including all teams from the current year's Women's Premier League. The competition began on 23 November 2023 with a round of 16.

The final was won by Al-Ahli, who beat Al-Shabab 3–2 at Kingdom Arena.

== Participating teams ==
The tournament features the participation of the following 16 teams: all teams from the 2023–24 Premier League season, with the remaining 8 spots determined by the results of the previous year's Saudi Women's First Division League results.

Saudi Women's Premier League the 7 clubs of the 2022–23 season	Saudi Women's First Division League the best 9 clubs of the 2022–23 season
1. Al-Nassr; 2. Al-Hilal; 3. Al-Shabab; 4. Al-Ittihad; 5. Al-Ahli; 6. Eastern Flames; 7. Al-Bayraq ▼	1. Al-Riyadh ▲; 2. Al-Qadsiah ▲; 3. Jeddah; 4. Najmat Jeddah; 5. United Eagles; 6. NEOM; 7. Saham; 8. Al-Hmmah; 9. Al-Amal

== Knockout stage ==
=== Bracket ===
The tournament bracket is shown below, with bold denoting the winners of each match.

Round of 16
23 November – Qatif
**Eastern Flames**	**18**
Saham	0
24 November – Khobar
**Al-Qadsiah**	**7**
Najmat Jeddah	0
23 November – Taif
Al-Amal	0
**Al-Nassr**	**9**
23 November – Riyadh
Al-Bayraq	1
**Al-Ahli**	**17**
24 November – Riyadh
**Al-Hilal**	**4**
NEOM	0
23 November – Jeddah
Jeddah Club	0
**Al-Shabab**	**8**
24 November – Riyadh
Al-Hmmah	0
**Al-Riyadh**	**5**
24 November – Jeddah
**Al-Ittihad**	**w/o**
United Eagles

Quarter-finals
29 December – Qatif
Eastern Flames	0
**Al-Qadsiah**	**3**
30 December – Riyadh
Al-Nassr	3
**Al-Ahli (a.e.t.)**	**4**
30 December – Riyadh
Al-Hilal	0
**Al-Shabab**	**2**
30 December – Jeddah
Al-Riyadh	0
**Al-Ittihad**	**5**

Semi-finals
9 February – Khobar
Al-Qadsiah	2
**Al-Ahli**	**3**
9 February – Riyadh
**Al-Shabab**	**5**
Al-Ittihad	4

Final
28 March – Riyadh
**Al-Ahli**	**3**
Al-Shabab	2
Third place play-off
27 March – Riyadh
**Al-Qadsiah**	**0 (5)**
Al-Ittihad	0 (4)

=== Round of 16 ===
There will be eight matches in the Round of 16, split over two days on November 23 and 24, 2023. The draw took place on September 6, 2023.

23 November 2023	**Eastern Flames**	**18–0**	**Saham**	Qatif
16:00	Kasonga 3', 6', 12', 15', 19', 30', 55', 64'; Al-Asiri 27', 62', 71', 88'; Mideros 31', 49'; Khan 45+1'; Ochoa 75', 77', 81'			Stadium: Prince Nayef Sports City Stadium; Referee: Ihsan Al-Shabeeb

23 November 2023	**Al-Amal**	**0–9**	**Al Nassr**	Taif
16:00			Hamad 3'; Luvanga 20', 38'; Jbarah 25', 41'; Boussaha 36', 48'; Aouni 88'; Ayadi 90+2'	Stadium: King Fahd Sports City Stadium; Referee: Ali Al-Qahtani

23 November 2023	**Jeddah Club**	**0–8**	**Al-Shabab**	Jeddah
19:00			Altuve 8', 10', 12', 33', 46', 83'; Mobarak 26'; Mansour 74'	Stadium: Sports Hall at King Abdullah Sports City; Referee: Anoud Al-Asmari

23 November 2023	**Al Bayraq**	**1–17**	**Al-Ahli**	Riyadh
20:00	Benlekhlef 75'		Kusi 5', 11', 27', 38', 41'; Jraïdi 17', 24', 26', 39', 45', 70', 78'; Al-Hawsawi 29'; Bensenouci 35', 67'; Hagan 58', 74'	Stadium: Inaya Medical Colleges Stadium; Referee: Reem Al-Dawsari

24 November 2023	**Al Qadsiah**	**7–0**	**Najmat Jeddah**	Khobar
16:00	Aby 1', 4', 17', 43'; Pérez 34', 45', 68'			Stadium: Prince Saud bin Jalawi Sports City Stadium; Referee: Mohammed Al-Hamdi

24 November 2023	**Al Hilal**	**4–0**	**Al-Suqoor**	Riyadh
16:00	Owusu 5', 12', 55'; Salihi 59'			Stadium: Inaya Medical Colleges Stadium; Referee: Abdullah Al-Nassar

24 November 2023	**Al-Ittihad**	**Cancelled**	**United Eagles**	Jeddah
19:00				Stadium: Al-Ittihad Club Stadium; Referee: Hibbah Al-Owaidi
Note: United Eagles withdrew from the matchday one day earlier, citing unforeseen circumstances.

24 November 2023	**Al-Hmmah**	**0–5**	**Al-Riyadh**	Riyadh
20:00			Rafinha 5', 47'; Daleem 18' (o.g.); Gómez 86'; Al Harthi 88'	Stadium: Inaya Medical Colleges Stadium; Referee: Reem Al-Bishi

=== Quarter-finals ===
In the quarter-finals, four matches were played as follows: the winner of match 1 hosted the winner of match 2, the winner of match 3 hosted the winner of match 4, the winner of match 5 hosted the winner of match 6, and the winner of match 8 hosted the winner of match 7.

29 December 2023	**Eastern Flames**	**0–3**	**Al Qadsiah**	Dammam
16:00			Pérez 20', 34'; Wyne 45+1'	Stadium: Prince Mohamed bin Fahd Stadium

30 December 2023	**Al-Hilal**	**0–2**	**Al-Shabab**	Riyadh
16:00			Chikwelu 34'; Altuve 66'	Stadium: Inaya Medical Colleges Stadium; Referee: Nasser Al-Khanfour

30 December 2023	**Al Nassr**	**3–4** (a.e.t.)	**Al-Ahli**	Riyadh
19:00	Aouni 40', 119' (pen.); Luvanga 65'		Jraïdi 33', 45', 93'; Kusi 101'	Stadium: Prince Faisal bin Fahd Sports City Stadium

30 December 2023	**Al-Ittihad**	**5–0**	**Al-Riyadh**	Jeddah
19:00	Plumptre 32'; Iskandar 66', 81'; Amani 80'; Robe 90+1'			Stadium: Al-Ittihad Club Stadium

=== Semi-finals ===
Two matches were played in the semi-finals on 9 February 2024, made up of the four winning teams from the quarter-finals.

9 February 2024	**Al-Qadsiah**	**2–3**	**Al-Ahli**	Khobar
16:00	Kabakaba 69' (o.g.); Nchout 90+7'		Jraïdi 44', 82'; Al-Shamrani 75'	Stadium: Al-Qadsiah Club Stadium

9 February 2024	**Al-Shabab**	**5–4**	**Al-Ittihad**	Riyadh
19:00	Mobarak 30', 32'; Ibrahim 61'; Mansour 70'; Sweilem 86'		Iskandar 38'; Amani 74'; Tawfiq 88'; Al-Ghamdi 90+3'	Stadium: Al-Shabab Club Stadium

=== Third place play-off ===
Third-place match play-off was played on 27 March 2024 in Riyadh.

27 March 2024	**Al-Qadsiah**	**0–0** (a.e.t.) (**5–4** p)	**Al-Ittihad**	Riyadh
22:00				Stadium: Prince Faisal bin Fahd Sports City; Referee: Mosad Al-Meshari
	**Penalties**
	Machado (penalty scored); Pérez (penalty scored); Wyne (penalty scored); Harris (penalty scored); Al-Ghamdi (penalty scored)		(penalty scored) Jebreen; (penalty scored) Mustafa; (penalty scored) Abdulrazak; (penalty missed) Shannak; (penalty scored) Plumptre

=== Final ===
The final was played at Kingdom Arena on 28 March 2024. This was the stadium's first-ever women's football game.

28 March 2024
22:00

Al-Ahli	3–2	Al-Shabab
Jraïdi 19', 51'; Kabakaba 55'		Altuve 68' (pen.); Abbassi 89'

Kingdom Arena, Riyadh
Referee: Karina Afanaseva (Russia)

**Al-Ahli**	**Al-Shabab**

GK	34	(Saudi Arabia) Ghaliah Emam
DF	19	(Jordan) Ayah Al-Majali
DF	8	(Saudi Arabia) Rahaf Al-Mansouri
DF	16	(Saudi Arabia) Huriyyah Al-Shamrani	(yellow card) 38'	(substituted off) 88'
MF	23	(Saudi Arabia) Raghad Mukhayzin
FW	9	(Morocco) Ibtissam Jraïdi (c)
FW	10	(Ghana) Alice Kusi		(substituted off) 87'
FW	11	(Saudi Arabia) Daliah Abu Laban	(yellow card) 65'	(substituted off) 65'
FW	27	(Democratic Republic of the Congo) Naomie Kabakaba
MF	22	(Saudi Arabia) Sawaher Asiri
MF	99	(Saudi Arabia) Rana Abdullah
Substitutes:
MF	3	(Saudi Arabia) Ghada Malhan
DF	55	(Saudi Arabia) Azah Joudah
FW	6	(Algeria) Abla Bensenouci
GK	1	(Jordan) Rawand Kassab
MF	15	(Saudi Arabia) Ahod Al-Amari
FW	17	(Saudi Arabia) Fadwa Khaled		(substituted on) 88'
FW	75	(Ghana) Cecilia Hagan		(substituted on) 87'
MF	24	(Saudi Arabia) Moluk Al-Hawsawi	(yellow card) 85'	(substituted on) 65'
MF	77	(Saudi Arabia) Roaa Al-Sulaimani
Manager:
(Jordan) Manar Fraij

GK	21	(Saudi Arabia) Mona Abdulrahman
DF	13	(Saudi Arabia) Tahani Al-Zahrani		(substituted off) 46'
DF	98	(Jordan) Lana Feras	(yellow card) 69' (yellow-red card) 90+3'
MF	18	(Nigeria) Rita Chikwelu		(substituted off) 61'
MF	3	(Saudi Arabia) Leen Mohammed (c)
FW	28	(Tunisia) Ella Kaabachi		(substituted off) 55'
MF	47	(Saudi Arabia) Moudi Abdulmohsen
MF	8	(Saudi Arabia) Adda Al-Fahad
FW	66	(Saudi Arabia) Al Bandari Mobarak		(substituted off) 46'
FW	7	(Saudi Arabia) Noura Ibrahim
FW	9	(Venezuela) Oriana Altuve
Substitutes:
GK	1	(Saudi Arabia) Laila Al-Qahtani
DF	2	(Saudi Arabia) Dalal Abdullatif
DF	5	(Saudi Arabia) Muneerah Ahmed
DF	4	(Tunisia) Chaima Abbassi	(yellow card) 75'	(substituted on) 61'
MF	17	(Saudi Arabia) Deem Saud
DF	29	(Saudi Arabia) Sarah Majed
FW	77	(Nigeria) Chinaza Agoh		(substituted on) 55'
FW	11	(Saudi Arabia) Fatimah Mansour		(substituted on) 46'
FW	22	(Saudi Arabia) Abeer Nasser		(substituted on) 46'
Manager:
(Spain) Miguel Morales

Assistant referees:
Ekaterina Chernova (Russia)
Irina Chechenina (Russia)
Fourth official:
Heba Al-Owedi

== Top scorers ==
Rank	Player	Club	Goals
1	(Morocco) Ibtissam Jraïdi	Al-Ahli	14
2	(Tanzania) Enekia Kasonga	Eastern Flames	8
2	(Venezuela) Oriana Altuve	Al-Shabab	8
4	(Ghana) Alice Kusi	Al-Ahli	6
5	(Mexico) Verónica Pérez	Al-Qadsiah	5
6	(Saudi Arabia) Shaikha Al-Asiri	Eastern Flames	4
6	(Ivory Coast) Jessica Aby	Al-Qadsiah	4
8	(Ghana) Mavis Owusu	Al-Hilal	3
8	(Mexico) Sofía Ochoa	Eastern Flames	3
8	(Tunisia) Samia Aouni	Al-Nassr	3
8	(Tanzania) Clara Luvanga	Al-Nassr	3
8	(Saudi Arabia) Al Bandari Mobarak	Al-Shabab	3
8	(Lebanon) Lili Iskandar	Al-Ittihad	3
14	(Algeria) Abla Bensenouci	Al-Ahli	2
14	(Brazil) Rafa Travalão	Al-Riyadh	2
14	(Algeria) Lina Boussaha	Al-Nassr	2
14	(Ghana) Cecilia Hagan	Al-Ahli	2
14	(Jordan) Maysa Jbarah	Al-Nassr	2
14	(Colombia) Ximena Mideros	Eastern Flames	2
14	(Saudi Arabia) Fatimah Mansour	Al-Shabab	2
14	(Morocco) Salma Amani	Al-Ittihad	2
22	(Tunisia) Ghada Ayadi	Al-Nassr	1
22	(Iraq) Shokhan Salihi	Al-Hilal	1
22	(Spain) Carla Gómez	Al-Riyadh	1
22	(Saudi Arabia) Kholoud Al Harthi	Al-Riyadh	1
22	(Saudi Arabia) Sara Hamad	Al-Nassr	1
22	(Saudi Arabia) Moluk Al-Hawsawi	Al-Ahli	1
22	(Pakistan) Maria Khan	Eastern Flames	1
22	(Algeria) Besma Benlakhlef	Al-Bayraq	1
22	(United States) Zaneta Wyne	Al-Qadsiah	1
22	(Nigeria) Rita Chikwelu	Al-Shabab	1
22	(Nigeria) Ashleigh Plumptre	Al-Ittihad	1
22	(Saudi Arabia) Seba Tawfiq	Al-Ittihad	1
22	(Saudi Arabia) Talah Al-Ghamdi	Al-Ittihad	1
22	(England) Leighanne Robe	Al-Ittihad	1
22	(Saudi Arabia) Huriyyah Al-Shamrani	Al-Ahli	1
22	(Cameroon) Ajara Nchout	Al-Qadsiah	1
22	(Saudi Arabia) Noura Ibrahim	Al-Shabab	1
22	(Jordan) Mai Sweilem	Al-Shabab	1
22	(Democratic Republic of the Congo) Naomie Kabakaba	Al-Ahli	1
22	(Tunisia) Chaima Abbassi	Al-Shabab	1

== Prize money ==
The Saudi Football Federation has approved the financial prizes for the Saudi Women's Cup. The champion received 750,000 Saudi Riyals, the second-place holder 500,000 Saudi Riyals, and the third-place holder 200,000 Saudi Riyals.

Place	Teams	Amount (in riyal)
Champions	1	750,000 SAR
Runners-up	1	500,000 SAR
Third place	1	200,000 SAR
Total	3	1,450,000 SAR
