= 2023–24 Saudi Women's Premier League =

Saudi Women's Premier League
- Season: 2023–24
- Dates: 13 October 2023 – 26 April 2024
- Champions: Al-Nassr (2nd title)
- Relegated: Al-Riyadh
- AFC Women's Champions League: Al-Nassr
- Matches: 56
- Goals: 224 (4 per match)
- Best player: (Algeria) Lina Boussaha
- Top goalscorer: (Morocco) Ibtissam Jraïdi (17 goals)
- Best goalkeeper: (United States) Lindsey Harris
- Biggest home win: Al-Ahli 8–0 Eastern Flames; 15 March 2024; Al-Ahli 8–0 Al-Riyadh; 26 April 2024
- Biggest away win: Al-Riyadh 2–13 Al-Ittihad; 16 March 2024
- Highest scoring: Al-Riyadh 2–13 Al-Ittihad; 16 March 2024
- Longest winning run: 8 games Al-Nassr
- Longest unbeaten run: 11 games Al-Nassr
- Longest winless run: 14 games Al-Riyadh
- Longest losing run: 8 games Al-Riyadh

The 2023–24 Saudi Women's Premier League was the second season of the Saudi Women's Premier League, the top-level women's football league in Saudi Arabia.

Al-Nassr were the defending champions and successfully retained their title.

== Overview ==
President of the Saudi Arabian Football Federation, Yasser Al Misehal, stated that this season would be the first to broadcast women's football in the country. Starting this season, Lay's will sponsor the league for three years.

== Teams ==
Eight teams will contest the 2023–24 Women's Premier League season. Al-Riyadh were confirmed as Division 1 champions on 9 February 2023, ensuring their debut in the Premier League. They replaced Sama, who were relegated last season. Al-Qadsiah (ex. Al Mutahed) also got promoted to the premier league after Al-Shabab acquired Al-Yamamah FC who finished 4th last season.

Locations of the 2023–24 Women's Premier League teams

Team	Location	Ground	Capacity	2022-23 Season
Al-Ahli	Jeddah	King Abdullah Sports City Stadium	62,345	6th
Al-Hilal	Riyadh	Inaya Medical Colleges Stadium	15,000	2nd
Al-Ittihad	Jeddah	Al-Ittihad Club Stadium	15,000	4th
Al-Nassr	Riyadh	Mrsool Park	25,000	1st
Al-Qadsiah	Khobar	Prince Saud bin Jalawi Stadium	15,000	D1, 2nd
Al-Riyadh	Riyadh	Prince Turki bin Abdul Aziz Stadium	15,000	D1, 1st
Al-Shabab	Riyadh	Prince Faisal bin Fahd Stadium	22,188	3rd
Eastern Flames	Dammam	Prince Mohamed bin Fahd Stadium	26,000	7th

=== Personnel and kits ===
Team	Manager	Captain	Kit manufacturer	Shirt sponsor
Al-Ahli	(Jordan) Manar Fraij	(Morocco) Ibtissam Jraïdi	Adidas	MG Cars, Boga Super Foods, Dorrah for Real Estate, Saudi German Hospital
Al-Hilal	(Serbia) Darko Stojanović	(Cameroon) Claudia Dabda	Puma	BLU Store, Jahez, Tawuniya, Floward, Shawarmer
Al-Ittihad	(United States) Kelly Lindsey	(Jordan) Shahnaz Jebreen	Nike	Darco, SAL, Emkan, Tameeni, Yelo, Oud Al-Amoudi
Al-Nassr	(Saudi Arabia) Abdulaziz Al-Alwni	(Tunisia) Samia Aouni	Nike	KAFD, AROYA Cruises, Noug
Al-Qadsiah	(Portugal) Luís Andrade	(Brazil) Rayanne Machado	Erreà	Switch, Masafi, United Facilities Management
Al-Riyadh	(Brazil) Claudio Vieira	(Saudi Arabia) Dina Huwaydi	Zeus	Yelo, Direct, Al Saif, Shumou Investment, AlDakheel Oud, Wataniya Finance
Al-Shabab	(Spain) Miguel Morales	(Saudi Arabia) Al Bandari Mobarak	Offside	Almozaini, Half Million, Mekyal, Azom, Bandar Real Estate, MOVE
Eastern Flames	(Spain) David Cabildo	(Saudi Arabia) Sara Al-Khater	Offside	Perpetual

=== Managerial changes ===
Team	Outgoing manager	Manner of departure	Date of vacancy	Position in table	Incoming manager	Date of appointment
Al-Shabab	(Saudi Arabia) Hussain Marzouq	Sacked	31 January 2024	6th	(Spain) Miguel Morales	31 January 2024
Al-Riyadh	(Spain) Ana Junyent	Sacked	17–21 March 2024	8th	(Brazil) Claudio Vieira	17–21 March 2024

== Foreign players ==
Club	Player 1	Player 2	Player 3	Player 4	Player 5	Player 6	Player 7	Player 8
Al-Ahli	(Algeria) Abla Bensenouci	(Democratic Republic of the Congo) Naomie Kabakaba	(Ghana) Cecilia Hagan	(Ghana) Alice Kusi	(Jordan) Ayah Al-Majali	(Jordan) Rawand Kassab	(Morocco) Ibtissam Jraïdi	
Al-Hilal	(Belarus) Anastasiya Linnik	(Cameroon) Claudia Dabda	(Egypt) Eman Hassan	(Ghana) Elizabeth Addo	(Ghana) Cynthia Konlan	(Ghana) Mavis Owusu	(Iraq) Shokhan Salihi	(Panama) Lineth Cedeño
Al-Nassr	(Algeria) Lina Boussaha	(Brazil) Izabela Stahelin	(France) Aminata Diallo	(Jordan) Maysa Jbarah	(Tanzania) Clara Luvanga	(Tunisia) Samia Aouni	(Tunisia) Ghada Ayadi	
Al-Qadsiah	(Brazil) Rayanne Machado	(Cameroon) Ajara Nchout	(Colombia) Elizabeth Carabalí	(Ivory Coast) Jessica Aby	(Mexico) Verónica Pérez	(United States) Lindsey Harris	(United States) Zaneta Wyne	
Al-Riyadh	(Brazil) Rafa Travalão	(Egypt) Omnia Mahmoud	(Spain) Míriam Diéguez	(Spain) Carla Gómez	(Spain) Aroa León	(Tunisia) Soulaima Jabrani		
Al-Shabab	(Jordan) Lana Feras	(Jordan) Mai Sweilem	(Netherlands) Corina Luijks	(Nigeria) Chinaza Agoh	(Nigeria) Rita Chikwelu	(Tunisia) Chaima Abbassi	(Tunisia) Ella Kaabachi	(Venezuela) Oriana Altuve
Al-Ittihad	(England) Leighanne Robe	(Jordan) Shahnaz Jebreen	(Jordan) Malak Shannak	(Lebanon) Lili Iskandar	(Morocco) Salma Amani	(Nigeria) Ashleigh Plumptre	(Syria) Nor Mustafa	
Eastern Flames	(Azerbaijan) Sevinj Jafarzade	(Colombia) Ximena Mideros	(Mexico) Sofía Ochoa	(Nigeria) Tochukwu Oluehi	(Pakistan) Maria Khan	(Tanzania) Enekia Kasonga	(United States) Erica Cunningham	

== League table ==
Pos	Team	Pld	W	D	L	GF	GA	GD	Pts	Qualification or relegation
1	Al-Nassr (C)	14	12	1	1	43	12	+31	37	Qualification for the 2024–25 AFC Women's Champions League
2	Al-Ahli	14	8	3	3	42	17	+25	27	
3	Al-Shabab	14	7	4	3	35	17	+18	25	
4	Al-Qadsiah	14	6	5	3	13	9	+4	23	
5	Al-Hilal	14	6	3	5	34	23	+11	21	
6	Al-Ittihad	14	6	2	6	37	22	+15	20	
7	Eastern Flames	14	1	1	12	12	45	−33	4	
8	Al-Riyadh (R)	14	0	1	13	8	79	−71	1	Relegation to the 2024–25 Saudi Women's First Division League

Updated to match(es) played on 22 March 2024. Source: SAFF
Rules for classification: 1) Points; 2) Goal difference; 3) Number of goals scored. Qualification and relegation column definitions
(C) Champions; (R) Relegated

== Results ==
Home \ Away	NAS	HIL	ASB	ITH	AHL	EFL	RIY	QDS
Al-Nassr		4–2	2–2	1–0	3–0	3–0	6–0	1–0
Al-Hilal	3–4		2–0	3–2	0–1	5–0	7–1	0–1
Al-Shabab	0–3 (Note: The result (3–0) was awarded in favor of Al-Nassr by the disciplinary committee due to Al-Shabab fielding an ineligible player, Al Bandari Mobarak, who had received a red card with her former club Al Yamamah in the previous season. The actual result of the match ended (2–0) in favor of Al-Shabab.)	2–2		0–1	0–0	2–0	9–2	2–0
Al-Ittihad	0–3	1–1	2–3		2–4	3–0	2–0	2–2
Al-Ahli	5–3	5–1	0–1	2–6		8–0	8–0	0–0
Eastern Flames	0–2	2–4	2–4	0–3	0–4		1–1	0–2
Al-Riyadh	0–6	0–4	1–10	2–13	0–4	1–6		0–2
Al-Qadsiah	0–2	0–0	0–0	1–0	1–1	3–1	1–0	

First match(es) will be played: 13 October 2023. Source: SAFF
Legend: Blue = home team win; Yellow = draw; Red = away team win.

== Season statistics ==
=== Top scorers ===
Rank	Player	Club	Goals
1	(Morocco) Ibtissam Jraïdi	Al-Ahli	17
2	(Venezuela) Oriana Altuve	Al-Shabab	14
3	(Algeria) Lina Boussaha	Al-Nassr	12
4	(Iraq) Shokhan Salihi	Al-Hilal	11
4	(Tanzania) Clara Luvanga	Al-Nassr	11
6	(Democratic Republic of the Congo) Naomie Kabakaba	Al-Ahli	10
7	(Nigeria) Ashleigh Plumptre	Al-Ittihad	8
8	(Ghana) Mavis Owusu	Al-Hilal	7
8	(Tanzania) Enekia Kasonga	Eastern Flames	7
10	(Ghana) Alice Kusi	Al-Ahli	6
10	(Tunisia) Ella Kaabachi	Al-Shabab	6
12	(Syria) Nor Mustafa	Al-Ittihad	5
12	(United States) Zaneta Wyne	Al-Qadsiah	5

=== Top assists ===
Rank	Player	Club	Assists
1	(Tanzania) Clara Luvanga	Al-Nassr	7
2	(Saudi Arabia) Al Bandari Mobarak	Al-Shabab	6
3	(Ghana) Elizabeth Addo	Al-Hilal	5
4	(Democratic Republic of the Congo) Naomie Kabakaba	Al-Ahli	4
4	(Ghana) Alice Kusi	Al-Ahli	4
4	(Jordan) Shahnaz Jebreen	Al-Ittihad	4
4	(Nigeria) Ashleigh Plumptre	Al-Ittihad	4
4	(Saudi Arabia) Sara Al-Hamad	Al-Nassr	4
4	(Saudi Arabia) Moluk Al-Hawsawi	Al-Ahli	4
4	(Saudi Arabia) Fatimah Mansour	Al-Shabab	4
4	(Venezuela) Oriana Altuve	Al-Shabab	4

=== Clean sheets ===
Rank	Player	Club	Clean sheets
1	(Saudi Arabia) Sara Khalid	Al-Nassr	8
1	(United States) Lindsey Harris	Al-Qadsiah	8
3	(Saudi Arabia) Mona Abdulrahman	Al-Shabab	6
4	(Jordan) Rawand Kassab	Al-Ahli	5
5	(Jordan) Malak Shannak	Al-Ittihad	3
5	(Saudi Arabia) Hessa Al-Sudairy	Al-Ittihad	3
7	(Ghana) Cynthia Konlan	Al-Hilal	2
7	(Saudi Arabia) Reem Al-Beloshi	Al-Nassr	2
7	(Saudi Arabia) Nawal Al-Gelaish	Al-Hilal	2
7	(Saudi Arabia) Ghaliah Emam	Al-Ahli	2

=== Hat-tricks ===
Player	For	Against	Result	Date	Ref.
(Algeria) Lina Boussaha	Al-Nassr	Al-Riyadh	6–0 (H)	13 October 2023	
(Nigeria) Ashleigh Plumptre	Al-Ittihad	Eastern Flames	3–0 (A)	14 October 2023	
(Nigeria) Ashleigh Plumptre	Al-Ittihad	Al-Ahli	6–2 (A)	15 December 2023	
(Tanzania) Enekia Kasonga	Eastern Flames	Al-Riyadh	6–1 (A)	20 October 2023	
(Iraq) Shokhan Salihi	Al-Hilal	Al-Riyadh	4–0 (A)	4 November 2023	
(Iraq) Shokhan Salihi	Al-Hilal	Al-Riyadh	7–1 (H)	4 February 2024	
(Venezuela) Oriana Altuve	Al-Shabab	Al-Riyadh	9–2 (H)	16 December 2023	
(Venezuela) Oriana Altuve	Al-Shabab	Al-Riyadh	10–1 (A)	19 April 2024	
(Morocco) Ibtissam Jraïdi	Al-Ahli	Al-Riyadh	4–0 (A)	23 December 2023	
(Morocco) Ibtissam Jraïdi	Al-Ahli	Al-Ittihad	4–2 (A)	19 April 2024	
(Morocco) Ibtissam Jraïdi	Al-Ahli	Al-Riyadh	8–0 (H)	26 April 2024	
(Democratic Republic of the Congo) Naomie Kabakaba	Al-Ahli	Eastern Flames	8–0 (H)	15 March 2024	
(Lebanon) Lili Iskandar	Al-Ittihad	Al-Riyadh	13–2 (A)	16 March 2024	
(Tunisia) Ella Kaabachi	Al-Shabab	Eastern Flames	4–2 (A)	23 March 2024	

=== Discipline ===
	Most yellow cards	Total	Most red cards	Total	Ref.
Player	(Jordan) Lana Feras (Al-Shabab) (Saudi Arabia) Joury Tarek (Al-Ittihad)	5	(Saudi Arabia) Al-Jawahara Saud (Al-Hilal)	2	
Club	Al-Hilal	21	Al-Shabab; Al-Hilal; Al-Nassr	1	

== Awards ==
=== Monthly awards ===
Month	Manager of the Month		Player of the Month		Goalkeeper of the Month		Goal of the Month		Reference
Month	Manager	Club	Player	Club	Player	Club	Player	Club	Reference
November	(United States) Kelly Lindsey	Al-Ittihad	(Nigeria) Ashleigh Plumptre	Al-Ittihad	(Jordan) Rawand Kassab	Al-Ahli	(Nigeria) Ashleigh Plumptre (vs. Eastern Flames)	Al-Ittihad	
December	(Serbia) Darko Stojanović	Al-Hilal	(Saudi Arabia) Sara Al-Hamad	Al-Nassr	(Saudi Arabia) Sara Khalid	Al-Nassr	(Tanzania) Clara Luvanga (vs. Al-Ittihad)	Al-Nassr	
January	(Jordan) Manar Fraij	Al-Ahli	(Morocco) Ibtissam Jraïdi	Al-Ahli	(Jordan) Rawand Kassab	Al-Ahli	(Ghana) Mavis Owusu (vs. Al-Ahli)	Al-Hilal	
February	(Jordan) Manar Fraij	Al-Ahli	(Morocco) Ibtissam Jraïdi	Al-Ahli	(Jordan) Rawand Kassab	Al-Ahli	(Ghana) Mavis Owusu (vs. Al-Ahli)	Al-Hilal	
March	(Jordan) Manar Fraij	Al-Ahli	(Democratic Republic of the Congo) Naomie Kabakaba	Al-Ahli	(Saudi Arabia) Nawal Al-Gelaish	Al-Hilal	(England) Leighanne Robe (vs. Al-Ahli)	Al-Ittihad	
April	(Jordan) Manar Fraij	Al-Ahli	(Democratic Republic of the Congo) Naomie Kabakaba	Al-Ahli	(Saudi Arabia) Nawal Al-Gelaish	Al-Hilal	(England) Leighanne Robe (vs. Al-Ahli)	Al-Ittihad	

== Team of the Season ==
Position	Player	Club
GK	(United States) Lindsey Harris	Al-Qadsiah
DF	(Brazil) Rayanne Machado	Al-Qadsiah
DF	(Nigeria) Ashleigh Plumptre	Al-Ittihad
DF	(Saudi Arabia) Danya Al-Sharif	Al-Qadsiah
DF	(Saudi Arabia) Tahani Al-Zahrani	Al-Shabab
MF	(Algeria) Lina Boussaha	Al-Nassr
MF	(Ghana) Elizabeth Addo	Al-Hilal
MF	(Ghana) Alice Kusi	Al-Ahli
MF	(Iraq) Shokhan Salihi	Al-Hilal
FW	(Morocco) Ibtissam Jraïdi	Al-Ahli
FW	(Venezuela) Oriana Altuve	Al-Shabab
