= 2024–25 Saudi Women's First Division League =

Saudi Women's First Division League
- Season: 2024–25
- Dates: 27 September – 25 April
- Champions: Neom
- Relegated: Al-Bayraq
- Matches: 72
- Goals: 546 (7.58 per match)
- Best Player: (Colombia) Diana Celis
- Top goalscorer: (Guinea) Fanta Camara (42 goals)
- Best goalkeeper: (Saudi Arabia) Haifa Fahad
- Biggest home win: Al-Riyadh 14–0 Jeddah; 20 December 2024
- Biggest away win: Al-Bayraq 0–40 Al-Riyadh; 28 December 2024
- Highest scoring: Al-Bayraq 0–40 Al-Riyadh; 28 December 2024
- All statistics correct as of 28 December 2024.

The 2024–25 Saudi Women's First Division League was the third edition of the Saudi Women's First Division League, the second tier of women's football league in Saudi Arabia. It was the first season after the restructuring of the two highest levels in Saudi women's football and the introduction of the Second Division League.

== Overview ==
On 25 September 2024, the Saudi Arabian Football Federation announced that the 2024–25 Saudi Women's First Division League matches would be broadcast on television for the first time via the (SAFF+) platform.

== Teams ==
Ten teams are set to compete in the 2024–25 First Division League season. This follows a restructuring of the women's game aimed at providing more competitiveness. The number of teams has been reduced from 17 in the first edition and 26 in the second edition to just 10 this season. The league will feature the nine teams that reached the final stages of the 2023–24 Saudi Women's First Division League (finishing 4th-12th) along with Al-Riyadh who got relegated from the Premier League. On 12 June 2024, Chapter 5 acquired United Eagles FC. On 11 July 2024, SAFF confirmed the ten participating teams. It was also announced that Al-Taqadom did not confirm its participation in the league within the previously specified timeframe by the Competitions Committee. and would be replaced by Al-Wehda who finished 13th in the last season. On 6 September 2024, the Federation announced that the division would proceed with 9 teams instead of 10, following Al-Wehda's withdrawal from the competition due to logistical reasons.

Locations of the 2024–25 Saudi Women's First Division League teams

Team	Location	Ground	Capacity	2023-24 Season
Abha	Abha	Prince Sultan bin Abdulaziz Reserve Stadium	15,000	5th
Al-Bayraq	Riyadh	Al Yamamah University Stadium	5,000	12th
Al-Hmmah	Riyadh	Al Yamamah University Stadium	5,000	7th
Al-Riyadh	Riyadh	Prince Turki bin Abdul Aziz Stadium	15,000	PL, 8th
Al-Shoulla	Al Kharj	Al-Shoulla Club Stadium	8,000	10th
Jeddah	Jeddah	King Abdullah Sports City Reserve Stadium (A)	10,000	8th
Neom	Tabuk	King Khalid Sport City Stadium	12,000	9th
Phoenix	Taif	King Fahd Sports City Reserve Stadium A	10,000	6th
United Eagles	Khobar	Prince Mohamed bin Fahd Stadium	26,000	11th

=== Personnel and kits ===
Team	Manager	Captain	Kit manufacturer	Shirt sponsor
Abha	(Egypt) Fayza Hider	(Saudi Arabia) Sabah Mohammed	Erreà	Yelo
Al-Bayraq	(Morocco) Boujiad Bouchaib			Al Yamamah University
Al-Hmmah	(Spain) José Luis Rojas			Al Yamamah University, RETRUVIA, World Ocean
Al-Riyadh	(Saudi Arabia) Hussin Marzoug	(Nigeria) Rita Chikwelu	Black Panther	Science Technology
Al-Shoulla	(Tunisia) Amani Boukari	(Egypt) Salwa Elmitwalli		
Jeddah	(Saudi Arabia) Nabil Al-Gharbi	(Algeria) Abla Bensenouci	Offside	Yelo
Neom	(Tunisia) Lassaad Hanini	(Jordan) Maysa Jbarah	Puma	
Phoenix	(Egypt) Abdel Fattah Abbas			One Piece Coffee
United Eagles	(Bulgaria) Rosen Ilkov	(Bahrain) Hessa Al-Isa	Offside	THE HUB CO

== Foreign players ==
On 12 June 2024, SAFF implemented detailed changes regarding foreign players and Saudi-born (Al-Mawalled) players in the Women's First Division League for the 2024–2025 season. the main roster size has been reduced from 30 to 25 players. Teams are required to register a Saudi goalkeeper or a Saudi-born (Al-Mawaleed; player born in 2004 or later), and can register up to 2 Saudi-born (Al-Mawalled) players, with one permitted to play on the field. Further, the maximum number of foreign players allowed is 5.

Club	Foreign players					Former players	
Club	Player 1	Player 2	Player 3	Player 4	Player 5	Player 1	Player 2
Abha	(Egypt) Eman Hassan	(Guinea) Damaye Camara	(Guinea) Mawa Traoré	(Guinea) Fanta Danda Camara	(Tunisia) Mariem Houij		
Al-Bayraq	(Togo) Folly-Abla Adoukoè	(Togo) Kouglo Bénédite	(Tunisia) Aya Jeddi	(Tunisia) Chayma Khazri	Atcham Nabo	(Tunisia) Chaima El Ayeb	(Tunisia) Hazar Soula
Al-Hmmah	(Cameroon) Sorelle Metiefang	(Cameroon) Natacha Nkonda	(Colombia) Carmen Quiñones	(Ivory Coast) Mariam Camara	(Togo) Takiyatou Yaya		
Al-Riyadh	(Egypt) Omnia Mahmoud	(Cameroon) Henriette Akaba	(Ghana) Elizabeth Addo	(Nigeria) Rita Chikwelu	(Nigeria) Joy Jerry		
Al-Shoulla	(Algeria) Kenza Hadjar	(Egypt) Salwa Elmitwalli	(Egypt) Sherouk Sayed	(Iraq) Hiba Raheem	(Tunisia) Rania Aouina		
Jeddah	(Algeria) Abla Bensenouci	(Burundi) Aniella Uwimana	(Ivory Coast) Stéphanie Gbogou	(Ghana) Cecilia Hagan			
NEOM	(Brazil) Priscilla	(Colombia) Diana Celis	(Colombia) Liana Salazar	(Jordan) Maysa Jbarah	(Tunisia) Chaima Abbassi		
Phoenix	(Algeria) Houria Affak	(Algeria) Fouzia Bakli	(Algeria) Rahma Benaichouche	(Algeria) Wahiba Kadri	(Algeria) Zeyneb Kandouci	(Georgia (country)) Ana Kirvalidze	(Morocco) Soumia Saber
United Eagles	(Bahrain) Hessa Al-Isa	(Bahrain) Rawan Al-Ali	(Bahrain) Leleya Sabkar	(Ivory Coast) Fatou Coulibaly	(Tunisia) Ghofrane Soula		

== League table ==
Pos	Team	Pld	W	D	L	GF	GA	GD	Pts	Promotion or relegation
1	NEOM (C)	16	16	0	0	117	9	+108	48	Promotion to the 2025–26 Saudi Women's Premier League
2	Abha	16	12	2	2	76	34	+42	38	Promotion to the 2025–26 Saudi Women's Premier League
3	Al-Riyadh	16	11	3	2	149	25	+124	36	
4	Al-Hmmah	16	10	0	6	65	39	+26	30	
5	United Eagles	16	6	1	9	40	55	−15	19	
6	Jeddah	16	6	1	9	27	59	−32	19	
7	Phoenix (Note: Phoenix were deducted three points and fined SAR 125,000 for breaching Article 59-1 of the Disciplinary Code during their match against United Eagles on 8 November 2023.)	16	5	0	11	32	66	−34	12	
8	Al-Shoulla	16	1	1	14	21	92	−71	−2	
9	Al Bayraq (Note: Al Bayraq were deducted six points)	16	1	0	15	19	167	−148	−3	Relegation to the 2025–26 Saudi Women's Second Division League
10	Al Wehda (Note: Al Wehda, who had initially taken Al-Taqadom's spot after the latter was disbanded, also withdrew from the league, reducing the number of teams to 9. Al Wehda's relegation means that only one other team will be relegated, instead of the initial two.)	0	0	0	0	0	0	0	0	Relegation after withdrawal to 2025–26 Saudi Women's Second Division.

Source: SAFF
Rules for classification: 1) Points; 2) Goal difference; 3) Number of goals scored.
(C) Champions

== Results ==
Home \ Away	NEO	RIY	ABH	HMM	UEG	JED	PHX	SHO	BAY
NEOM		2–1	5–0	5–2	4–0	5–1	7–0	13–0	15–0
Al-Riyadh	2–4		2–2	6–0	7–4	14–0	12–1	9–1	15–1
Abha	0–6	5–5		4–1	2–0	9–0	8–3	3–0	8–0
Al-Hmmah	0–5	1–5	1–5		2–0	4–1	5–0	5–2	13–0
United Eagles	0–8	1–12	3–7	4–5		0–1	3–0 (Note: The original fixture on November 8 was suspended with United Eagles leading 4–3 after 31' in the first half and 33' in the second. On November 12, the SAFF Disciplinary Committee ruled that Phoenix Club would forfeit the match, awarding United Eagles a 3–0 victory.)	5–0	9–1
Jeddah	1–6	2–2	4–5	0–4	1–2		2–4	2–1	4–0
Phoenix	1–9	0–5	2–3	4–1	2–2	1–3		2–0	3–0
Al-Shoulla	0–3	1–12	1–13	1–5	3–3	0–1	1–4		6–5
Al Bayraq	1–20	0–40	1–2	0–13	0–3	2–4	1–8	6–5	

Source: SAFF
Legend: Blue = home team win; Yellow = draw; Red = away team win.

== Season statistics ==
=== Top scorers ===
Rank	Player	Club	Goals
1	(Guinea) Fanta Camara	Abha	43
2	(Colombia) Diana Celis	NEOM	41
3	(Ghana) Elizabeth Addo	Al-Riyadh	31
4	(Nigeria) Joy Jerry	Al-Riyadh	28
5	(Jordan) Maysa Jbarah	NEOM	26
6	(Togo) Takiyatou Yaya	Al-Hmmah	22
7	(Algeria) Abla Bensenouci	Jeddah	19
8	(Nigeria) Rita Chikwelu	Al-Riyadh	18
8	(Tunisia) Meriem Houij	Abha	18
10	(Ivory Coast) Mariam Camara	Al-Hmmah	17

=== Hat-tricks ===
Player	For	Against	Result	Date
(Algeria) Rahma Benaichouche	Phoenix	Al-Bayraq	8–1 (A)	27 September 2024
(Bahrain) Hessa Al-Isa	Untied Eagles	Al-Riyadh	4–7 (A)	28 September 2024
(Bahrain) Hessa Al-Isa	Untied Eagles	Al-Bayraq	9–1 (H)	5 October 2024
(Colombia) Diana Celis	NEOM	Abha	6–0 (A)	4 October 2024
(Colombia) Diana Celis	NEOM	Al-Bayraq	20–1 (A)	14 December 2024
(Colombia) Diana Celis	NEOM	Al-Shoulla	13–0 (H)	27 December 2024
(Colombia) Diana Celis	NEOM	Jeddah	5–1 (H)	1 February 2025
(Colombia) Diana Celis	NEOM	Al-Bayraq	15–0 (H)	15 March 2025
(Colombia) Diana Celis	NEOM	Phoenix	7–0 (H)	19 April 2025
(Bahrain) Rawan Al-Ali	United Eagles	Al-Bayraq	9–1 (H)	5 October 2024
(Algeria) Abla Bensenouci	Jeddah	Al-Bayraq	4–2 (A)	11 October 2024
(Algeria) Abla Bensenouci	Jeddah	Al-Bayraq	4–0 (H)	24 January 2025
(Togo) Takiyatou Yaya	Al-Hmmah	Al-Shoulla	5–2 (H)	12 October 2024
(Togo) Takiyatou Yaya	Al-Hmmah	Al-Bayraq	13–0 (H)	21 December 2024
(Togo) Takiyatou Yaya	Al-Hmmah	Jeddah	4–1 (H)	7 March 2025
(Togo) Takiyatou Yaya	Al-Hmmah	Al-Bayraq	13–0 (A)	19 April 2025
(Guinea) Fanta Camara	Abha	Al-Bayraq	8–0 (H)	8 November 2024
(Guinea) Fanta Camara	Abha	Jeddah	9–0 (H)	15 November 2024
(Guinea) Fanta Camara	Abha	United Eagles	7–3 (A)	22 November 2024
(Guinea) Fanta Camara	Abha	Al-Riyadh	5–5 (H)	14 December 2024
(Guinea) Fanta Camara	Abha	Al-Shoulla	13–1 (A)	21 December 2024
(Guinea) Fanta Camara	Abha	Al-Hmmah	4–1 (H)	28 December 2024
(Guinea) Fanta Camara	Abha	Phoenix	8–3 (H)	25 January 2025
(Guinea) Fanta Camara	Abha	Jeddah	5–4 (A)	8 February 2025
(Guinea) Fanta Camara	Abha	Al-Hmmah	5–1 (A)	26 April 2025
(Tunisia) Mariem Houij	Abha	Al-Bayraq	8–0 (H)	8 November 2024
(Tunisia) Mariem Houij	Abha	Jeddah	9–0 (H)	15 November 2024
(Tunisia) Mariem Houij	Abha	Al-Shoulla	13–1 (A)	21 December 2024
(Tunisia) Mariem Houij	Abha	Phoenix	8–3 (H)	25 January 2025
(Nigeria) Joy Jerry	Al-Riyadh	Al-Shoulla	12–1 (A)	9 November 2024
(Nigeria) Joy Jerry	Al-Riyadh	Jeddah	14–0 (H)	20 December 2024
(Nigeria) Joy Jerry	Al-Riyadh	Al-Bayraq	40–0 (A)	28 December 2024
(Nigeria) Joy Jerry	Al-Riyadh	Al-Bayraq	15–1 (H)	26 April 2025
(Ghana) Elizabeth Addo	Al-Riyadh	Phoenix	12–1 (H)	15 November 2024
(Ghana) Elizabeth Addo	Al-Riyadh	Abha	5–5 (A)	14 December 2024
(Ghana) Elizabeth Addo	Al-Riyadh	Jeddah	14–0 (H)	20 December 2024
(Ghana) Elizabeth Addo	Al-Riyadh	Al-Hmmah	6–0 (H)	18 January 2025
(Ghana) Elizabeth Addo	Al-Riyadh	Al-Bayraq	15–1 (H)	26 April 2025
(Nigeria) Rita Chikwelu	Al-Riyadh	Phoenix	12–1 (H)	15 November 2024
(Nigeria) Rita Chikwelu	Al-Riyadh	Al-Bayraq	40–0 (A)	28 December 2024
(Nigeria) Rita Chikwelu	Al-Riyadh	Al-Shoulla	9–1 (H)	1 February 2025
(Ivory Coast) Mariam Camara	Al-Hmmah	Phoenix	5–0 (H)	13 December 2025
(Ivory Coast) Mariam Camara	Al-Hmmah	Al-Bayraq	13–0 (H)	21 December 2024
(Iraq) Hiba Raheem	Al-Shoulla	United Eagles	3–3 (H)	13 December 2025
(Jordan) Maysa Jbarah	NEOM	Al-Bayraq	20–1 (A)	14 December 2024
(Jordan) Maysa Jbarah	NEOM	Phoenix	9–1 (A)	20 December 2024
(Jordan) Maysa Jbarah	NEOM	Al-Shoulla	13–0 (H)	27 December 2024
(Jordan) Maysa Jbarah	NEOM	United Eagles	8–0 (A)	25 January 2025
(Cameroon) Henriette Akaba	Al-Riyadh	Jeddah	14–0 (H)	20 December 2024
(Cameroon) Henriette Akaba	Al-Riyadh	Al-Bayraq	40–0 (A)	28 December 2024
(Colombia) Liana Salazar	NEOM	Al-Shoulla	13–0 (H)	27 December 2024
(Saudi Arabia) Fay Al-Bumaidan	Al-Riyadh	Al-Bayraq	40–0 (A)	28 December 2024
(Saudi Arabia) Fay Al-Bumaidan	Al-Riyadh	Al-Shoulla	9–1 (H)	1 February 2025
(Saudi Arabia) Dina Huwaydi	Al-Riyadh	Al-Bayraq	40–0 (A)	28 December 2024
(Saudi Arabia) Khloud Ahmed	Al-Riyadh	Al-Bayraq	40–0 (A)	28 December 2024
(Togo) Kouglo Bénédite	Al-Bayraq	Al-Shoulla	7–4 (H)	8 February 2025
(Tunisia) Aya Jeddi	Al-Bayraq	Al-Shoulla	7–4 (H)	8 February 2025
(Egypt) Salwa Elmitwalli	Al-Shoulla	Al-Bayraq	7–4 (A)	8 February 2025
(Algeria) Houria Affak	Phoenix	Al-Shoulla	4–1 (A)	8 March 2025
(Tunisia) Rania Aouina	Al-Hmmah	Phoenix	4–1 (A)	15 March 2025
(Cameroon) Natacha Nkonda	Al-Hmmah	Al-Bayraq	13–0 (A)	19 April 2025
