= Jana Al-Shammari =

Saudi footballer (born 2007)

Jana Al-Shammeri
Personal information
- Full name: Jana Fahad Al-Shammeri
- Date of birth: 5 December 2007 (age 18)
- Place of birth: Saudi Arabia
- Position: Midfielder

Team information
- Current team: Al-Nassr
- Number: 16

Senior career*
Years	Team	Apps	(Gls)
2023–2024	Al-Hmmah		
2025	Al-Riyadh		
2025–2026	Al-Amal		
2026–	Al-Nassr		

International career
2024	Saudi Arabia U17		
- * Club domestic league appearances and goals

Jana Fahad Al-Shammeri (Arabic: جنا فهد الشمري; born 5 December 2007) is a Saudi footballer who plays as a midfielder for Saudi Women's First Division League club Al-Amal.

== Club career ==
Al-Shammeri started playing with Al-Hmmah in the 2023/2024 season of the Saudi Women's First Division League.

In addition to her participation with Al-Hmmah in the 2023/2024 season of the Saudi Women's First Division League, Al-Shammeri participated in the girls’ school league known as Dawri Madaris with the Al Tarbiyah Private School team (Arabic: فريق ثانوية التربية الأهلية) and she won the title.

In the following season 2024/2025, Al-Shammeri participated with the Al-Hmmah U-17 team in the Saudi Women's U-17 Tournament, and topped the scorers list in the first round.

In January 2025, Al-Riyadh signed Al-Shammeri, who led them to third place and the bronze medal in the 2024–25 Saudi Women's First Division League.

At the start of the 2025–26 Saudi Women's First Division League, Al-Shammari played for Al-Amal, before transferring in January 2026 to Al-Nassr to play with them in the first edition of the 2025–26 Saudi Girls' U-17 Premier League.

== International career ==
On 17 January 2024, Jana Al-Shammeri joined the under-17 team with Croatian coach Stella Gotal to participate in the Jeddah camp.

== Honours ==
=== Club ===
Al-Riyadh

- Saudi Women's First Division League

(bronze) Third place: 2024–25
