= Moluk Al-Hawsawi =

Saudi footballer (born 2005)

Personal information
- Full name: Moluk Osama Abubakor Al-Hawsawi
- Date of birth: 10 January 2005 (age 21)
- Place of birth: Medina, Saudi Arabia
- Position: Forward

Team information
- Current team: Al-Ahli
- Number: 24

Senior career*
Years	Team	Apps	(Gls)
2022–	Al-Ahli	21	(6)

International career^{‡}
2023–	Saudi Arabia U20	1	(1)
2023–	Saudi Arabia	2	(0)
- * Club domestic league appearances and goals as of 30 December 2023 ‡ National team caps and goals as of 12 January 2024

Moluk Osama Abubakor Al-Hawsawi (Arabic: ملوك أسامة أبوبكر الهوساوي; born 10 January 2005) is a Saudi professional footballer who plays as a forward for the Saudi Women's Premier League (SWPL) club Al-Ahli and the Saudi Arabia national team.

== Club career ==
=== Al-Ahli 2022–present ===
Moluk was initially a member of Miraas Jeddah club. When Al-Ahli took over the club, she stayed on and successfully secured a spot in Al-Ahli's lineup for all games during the 2022–23 season, where she scored 2 goals in that season. Scoring her first goal on 21 October 2022 against Sama. in the 2023–24 fourth round, she shone brightly for Al-Ahli. Scoring her first goal of the season in the 4–0 victory against Eastern Flames. Malak's versatility in playing on the wings has added diverse offensive options to Al-Ahli's strategies. Under the coaching of Manar Fraij, her success as a regular starter this season continues her impressive development since the 2023-2022 season.

== International career ==
In December 2023, Al-Hawsawi was selected by Scottish coach Pauline Hamill for the first-ever Saudi Arabia women's national under-20 football team.

Later that month, her performance with Al-Ahli in both the league and cup competitions earned her a call-up to the senior national team, by the newly appointed Spanish coach, Lluís Cortés. On 8 January 2024, She debuted for the senior team in a 2–0 win against Syria, when she was substituted in, replacing Sara Hamad in the 65th minute.

== Career statistics ==
=== Club ===
As of match played 30 December 2023

Appearances and goals by club, season and competition
Club	Season	League			Cup		Continental		Other		Total	
Club	Season	Division	Apps	Goals	Apps	Goals	Apps	Goals	Apps	Goals	Apps	Goals
Al-Ahli	2022–23	SWPL	14	2	–	–	—		—		14	0
Al-Ahli	2023–24	SWPL	7	2	2	2	—		—		9	4
Al-Ahli	Total		21	4	2	2	—		—		23	6
Career total			21	4	2	2	—		—		23	6

=== International ===
As of match played 30 September 2023

Appearances and goals by national team and year
National team	Year	Apps	Goals
Saudi Arabia	2024	0	0
Total		0	0

== Honours ==
Al-Ahli

- SAFF Women's Cup:

(gold) Champion: 2023–24
