= Ahod Al-Amari =

Saudi footballer (born 1991)

Personal information
- Full name: Ahod Khalid Al-Amari
- Date of birth: 11 April 1991 (age 35)
- Place of birth: Saudi Arabia
- Position: Midfielder

Senior career*
Years	Team	Apps	(Gls)
2022–2023	Al Hilal		
2023–2024	Al-Ahli		

International career
2022	Saudi Arabia		

Managerial career
- 2024–: Saudi Arabia (assistant)
- * Club domestic league appearances and goals

Ahod Khalid Al-Amari (Arabic: عُهُود خَالِد الْعَمَّارِيّ; born 11 April 1991) is a Saudi former footballer who played as a midfielder for Saudi Women's Premier League club Al-Ahli. Since 2024, she has been an assistant coach of the Saudi women's national team.

== Club career ==
Al-Amari played in the 2022–23 season of the Saudi Women's Premier League with Al Hilal, and was captain of the team, ending the season in second place.

In the following season 2023–24, she moved to Al Ahli, winning with them the SAFF Women's Cup and second place in the Saudi Women's Premier League.

After the conclusion of the 2023–24 season of the Saudi Women's Premier League, Al-Amari retired from football. Her final game as a player was for Al-Ahli against Al-Riyadh on 26 March 2024.

== International career ==
In February 2022, Al-Amari was named as part of the first-ever Saudi Arabia women's national football team for the two friendlies against Seychelles and Maldives.

== Coaching career ==
After retiring from playing football, Ahod Al-Amari entered the field of coaching, training girls U17 at the Regional Training Centers (RTC) of the Saudi Arabian Football Federation. She helped train young players at a SAFF talent-scouting camp in Riyadh.

In May 2024, the Saudi Arabian Football Federation appointed Al-Amari assistant to the national team's Spanish coach, Lluís Cortés.

In 2024, she completed a six-week coaching internship with Sevilla's women's team as part of SAFF's Future Falcons coach development program. She worked with the first-team staff during Liga F matches, including against Barcelona and Valencia, and helped train the reserve and under-19 teams. She was also the focus of an episode on Arab football in Sevilla's documentary series Never Give Up.

She was Cortés's assistant at the 2025 WAFF Women's Championship in Jeddah.

== Honours ==
=== Club ===
Al-Hilal

- Saudi Women's Premier League:
  - Runners-up: 2022–23

Al-Ahli

- SAFF Women's Cup:

(gold) Champion: 2023–24

- Saudi Women's Premier League:
  - Runners-up: 2023–24
