= 2026–27 Saudi Women's Cup =

2026–27 SAFF Women's Cup
Tournament details
- Country: Saudi Arabia
- Dates: 15 October 2026 – 30 April 2027
- Teams: 16

Tournament statistics
- Matches played: 3
- Goals scored: 25 (8.33 per match)
- All statistics correct as of 16 October 2026. Goals scored in penalty shoot-outs not included.

The 2026–27 Saudi Women's Cup, officially the 2026–27 SAFF Women's Cup (Arabic: كأس الاتحاد السعودي للسيدات لموسم 2026/27) is the fouth season of the annual Saudi women's football cup competition.

The competition began on 15 October 2026 with the round of 16 and is scheduled to end on 30 April 2027.

== Participating clubs ==
After featuring 12 teams last season due to several clubs disbanding their teams, the cup returns to its original 16-team format under the competition regulations. With all Premier League clubs qualifying automatically, with the remaining places awarded to First Division teams based on their league standings.

Saudi Women's Premier League the 8 clubs of the 2026–27 season	Saudi Women's First Division League the 8 clubs of the 2026–27 season
1. Al Nassr; 2. Al Ahli; 3. Al Ittihad; 4. Al Qadsiah; 5. Al Hilal; 6. Al Ula; 7. NEOM; 8. Al Taraji (promoted)	1. Eastern Flames (relegated); 2. Al Hmmah; 3. Al Yarmouk; 4. Najmat Jeddah; 5. United Eagles; 6. Al Shams (promoted); 7. Al Qunfidah (promoted); 8. Al Hejaz (promoted)

=== Draw and seeding ===
The draw was held on 7 September 2026 via videoconference from the federation's headquarters.

Teams were seeded according to their overall rankings in the 2025–26 Saudi women's leagues and divided into two pots, one containing Premier League teams and the other containing First Division teams.

== Knockout stage ==
=== Bracket ===
The tournament bracket is shown below, with bold denoting the winners of each match.

Round of 16
13 November – Riyadh
**Al Nassr**	**3**
Al Shams	0
13 November – Medina
Al Ula	3
**Al Hmmah**	**5**
13 November – Khobar
**Al Qadsiah**	**13**
Al Yarmouk	0
15 October – Jeddah
Al Qunfidah	1
**Al Ahli**	**7**
16 October – Jeddah
Najmat Jeddah	2
**NEOM**	**10**
13 November – Qatif
United Eagles	0
**Al Hilal**	**9**
15 October – Qatif
**Al Taraji**	**5**
Eastern Flames	0
17 October – Jeddah
**Al Ittihad**	**5**
Al Hejaz	1

Quarter-finals
Al Nassr
Al Hmmah
Al Qadsiah
Al Ahli
NEOM
Al Hilal
Al Taraji
Al Ittihad

Semi-finals

Final
Third place play-off

=== Round of 16 ===
15 October 2026	**Al Taraji**	**5–0**	**Eastern Flames**	Qatif
17:50	Lawal 5', 7', 87', 89'; Osei 63'			Stadium: Al Taraji Club Stadium; Referee: Nasser al-Dareh

15 October 2026	**Al Qunfidah**	**1–7**	**Al Ahli**	Jeddah
20:00	Ouerghemi 82'		Semedo 2'; Uchendu 14', 18', 40'; Al Hawsawi 45+1'; Bravo 67'; Fahad 85'	Referee: Sultan Okairy

16 October 2026	**Najmat Jeddah**	**2–10**	**NEOM**	Jeddah
17:10	Gbogou 16'; Muluneh 32'		Omboudou 13'; Al Sultan 19'; Abdullah 23'; Kaaki 40'; Salihi 42', 47', 54', 55', 65', 86'	Stadium: Jeddah Club Stadium; Referee: Omar Ammar

17 October 2026	**Al Ittihad**	**5–1**	**Al Hejaz**	Jeddah
18:35	Al Mubarak 8'; Balkhudher 26'; Chamorro 42', 45'; Al Thobaiti 67'		Aboudi 16'	Stadium: Al-Ittihad Club Stadium (Reserve Pitch 1); Referee: Awad al-Zubaidi

13 November 2026	**Al Qadsiah**	**13–0**	**Al Yarmouk**	Khobar
17:30	González 6', 16', 54', 78'; Al Qahtani 7'; Duda 28'; Al Yahya 35', 77'; Adriana 42', 47', 79'; Álvarez 75'; Le Garrec 89'			Stadium: Al Qadsiah Club Stadium; Referee: Reem al-Dossary

13 November 2026	**United Eagles**	**0–9**	**Al Hilal**	Qatif
17:30			Oshoala 4', 24', 42', 71'; Al Dhuhiyan 47', 54'; Kathellen 49'; Al Shamiri 60', 64'	Stadium: Al Taraji Club Stadium; Referee: Kalthoom Hantool

13 November 2026	**Al Nassr**	**3–0**	**Al Shams**	Riyadh
17:45	Al Fathi 7', 78'; Al Saiari 17'			Stadium: Al Nassr Club Stadium; Referee: Ibraheem al-Zahrah

13 November 2026	**Al Ula**	**3–5**	**Al Hmmah**	Medina
18:15	Zedadka 29'; Abam 66', 90+4'		Artin 31'; Ournani 42', 53', 87'; Sofyani 55'	Stadium: Ohod Club Stadium; Referee: Faisal al-Suweegh

=== Quarter-finals ===
**Al Nassr**	**v**	**Al Hmmah**

**Al Qadsiah**	**v**	**Al Ahli**

**NEOM**	**v**	**Al Hilal**

**Al Taraji**	**v**	**Al Ittihad**

== Top goalscorers ==
As of 13 November 2026

Rank	Player	Club	Goals
1	(Iraq) Shokhan Salihi	NEOM	6
2	(Nigeria) Taiwo Lawal	Al Taraji	4
2	(Spain) Esther González	Al Qadsiah	4
4	(Algeria) Khouloud Ournani	Al Hmmah	3
4	(Brazil) Adriana Silva	Al Qadsiah	3
4	(Nigeria) Asisat Oshoala	Al Hilal	3
4	(Nigeria) Chinaza Uchendu	Al Ahli	3
8	(Cameroon) Michaela Abam	Al Ula	2
8	(Paraguay) Lice Chamorro	Al Ittihad	2
8	(Saudi Arabia) Danah Al Dhuhiyan	Al Hilal	2
8	(Saudi Arabia) Layan Al Fathi	Al Nassr	2
8	(Saudi Arabia) Abeer Al Shamiri	Al Hilal	2
8	(Saudi Arabia) Maram Al Yahya	Al Qadsiah	2
