= Huriyyah Al-Shamrani =

Saudi footballer (born 2004)

Personal information
- Full name: Huriyyah Hamdan Al-Shamrani
- Date of birth: 14 July 2004 (age 22)
- Place of birth: Jeddah, Saudi Arabia
- Positions: Defender; winger

Team information
- Current team: Al-Qadsiah

Senior career*
Years	Team	Apps	(Gls)
2021–2022	The White Lion FC		
2022	Jeddah Pride FFC	2	(4)
2022–2026	Al-Ahli	17	(1)
2026–	Al-Qadsiah		

International career^{‡}
2023–	Saudi Arabia	8	(0)
- * Club domestic league appearances and goals as of 27 January 2024 ‡ National team caps and goals as of 12 January 2024

Huriyyah Hamdan Al-Shamrani (Arabic: حوريه حمدان الشمراني; born 14 July 2004) is a Saudi footballer who plays as a defender or a winger for Saudi Women's Premier League side Al-Qadsiah and the Saudi Arabia national team.

== Club career ==
Huriyyah started her football journey playing with her sisters at home. Yet, she practiced and got better playing with the 'Tigers.' Later, she joined the White Lion Football Club in Jeddah and became their captain. Later, she joined the Jeddah Pride Female Football Club and played in the first edition of the Saudi Women's First Division League with them. She also took part in a training camp with the Spanish team Levante.

=== Al-Ahli ===
On 8 December 2022, Al-Ahli announced the signing of Huriyyah in the winter transfer window, adding her to their squad for the second half of the 2022–23 season. She debuted for the team on 9 December 2023, in a two-nil win over Eastern Flames. On 4 February 2023, she scored her first goal for the club scoring in the 54th minute in a 3–6 loss to Al Hilal.

=== Al-Qadsiah ===
On 5 September 2026, Al-Qadsiah signed Al-Shamrani to compete with the team in the 2026–27 Saudi Women's Premier League.

== International career ==
Huriyyah got her first call-up for the senior national team in February 2023, to participate in friendlies against Indonesia. On 22 February 2023, she made her debut for the team against Indonesia.

== Career statistics ==
=== Club ===
As of match played 27 January 2024

Appearances and goals by club, season and competition
Club	Season	League			Cup		Continental		Other		Total	
Club	Season	Division	Apps	Goals	Apps	Goals	Apps	Goals	Apps	Goals	Apps	Goals
Jeddah Pride	2022–23	SWFDL	2	4	–	–	—		—		2	4
Jeddah Pride	Total		2	4	–	–	—		—		2	4
Al-Ahli	2022–23	SWPL	7	1	–	–	—		—		7	1
Al-Ahli	2023–24	SWPL	8	0	2	0	—		—		10	0
Al-Ahli	Total		15	1	2	0	—		—		17	1
Career total			17	5	2	0	—		—		19	5

=== International ===
As of match played 12 January 2024

Appearances and goals by national team and year
National team	Year	Apps	Goals
Saudi Arabia	2023	7	0
Saudi Arabia	2024	1	0
Total		8	0

== Honours ==
Al-Ahli

- SAFF Women's Cup:

(gold) Champion: 2023–24
