= Najd Al-Otaibi =

Saudi footballer (born 2005)

Personal information
- Full name: Najd Fahad Al-Otaibi
- Date of birth: 2 October 2005 (age 21)
- Place of birth: Saudi Arabia
- Position: Defender

Team information
- Current team: Al-Yarmouk
- Number: 2

Senior career*
Years	Team	Apps	(Gls)
2023–2024	Al Qadsiah		
2024–2025	Al-Riyadh		
2025–	Al-Yarmouk		
- * Club domestic league appearances and goals

Najd Fahad Al-Otaibi (Arabic: نَجْد فَهْد الْعُتَيْبِيّ; born 2 October 2005) is a Saudi footballer who plays as a Defender for the Saudi Women's First Division League club Al-Riyadh.

== Club career ==
In March 2023, Al-Otaibi was selected among the 11 best players from the Girls’ Schools League known as (Dawri Madaris) to participate with them in a training camp held in Barcelona.

Al-Otaibi played with Al Qadsiah in the 2023–24 season of the Saudi Women's Premier League.

In August 2024, Al-Otaibi moved to Al-Riyadh in the 2024–25 Saudi Women's First Division League.

== Honours ==
=== Club ===
Al-Riyadh

- Saudi Women's First Division League

(bronze) Third place: 2024–25

== Personal life ==
Her sister, Majd Al-Otaibi, plays football in the Saudi Women's Premier League and the Saudi Women's National Team.
