= Danya Al-Sharif =

Saudi footballer (born 2000)

Personal information
- Full name: Danya Alaeddin Al-Sharif
- Date of birth: 19 October 2000 (age 26)
- Place of birth: Saudi Arabia
- Position: Midfielder

Senior career*
Years	Team	Apps	(Gls)
2022–2025	Al-Qadsiah		
- * Club domestic league appearances and goals

Danya Alaeddin Al-Sharif (Arabic: دانية علاءالدين الشريف; born 19 October 2000) is a Saudi footballer who played as a midfielder for Saudi Women's Premier League side Al-Qadsiah.

== Club career ==
Al-Sharif played with Al-Qadsiah in the 2023–24 season of the Saudi Women's Premier League.

Al-Sharif contributed to her team getting third place and a bronze medal in the 2023–24 SAFF Women's Cup.

At the end of the season, Al-Sharif was selected among the 11 best players (Team of the Season) in the 2023–24 Saudi Women's Premier League.

== Honours ==
Al Qadsiah

- SAFF Women's Cup: Third place: 2023–24

Individual

- Saudi Women's Premier League Team of the Season: 2023–24
