= Lama Al-Fadl =

Saudi footballer (born 2000)

Personal information
- Full name: Lama Mishal Al-Fadl
- Date of birth: 24 May 2000 (age 26)
- Place of birth: Saudi Arabia
- Position: Winger

Team information
- Current team: Al-Ahli

Senior career*
Years	Team	Apps	(Gls)
2022	Jeddah Eagles		
2022–2023	Al-Ittihad		
2023–2024	Jeddah Club		
2024–2025	Al-Ahli		
- * Club domestic league appearances and goals

Lama Mishal Al-Fadl (Arabic: لمى مشعل الفضل; born 24 May 2000) is a Saudi footballer who plays as a winger for Saudi Women's Premier League side Al-Ahli.

== Club career ==
Al-Fadl played with Jeddah Eagles in the SAFF Women's National Football Championship.

Since Al-Ittihad acquired Jeddah Eagles in 2022, Al-Fadl played as a striker in the 2022/23 Saudi Women's Premier League, scoring a goal against Al-Ahli in the Jeddah Derby on 17 December 2022.

In the 2023/2024 season, Al-Fadl moved to Jeddah Club, to play with them in the Saudi Women's First Division League.

In August 2024, Al-Ahli signed Al-Fadl, before the start of the 2024–25 Saudi Women's Premier League.

Following the conclusion of the 2024–25 season of the Saudi Women's Premier League, Al-Fadl decided to retire from playing football due to a back injury, and subsequently took on the role of team manager at the Jeddah PRO Academy, participating in the 2025–26 Saudi girl's U-15 Tournament.

== Honours ==
=== Club ===
Al-Ahli

- Saudi Women's Premier League:

(silver) second place: 2024–25

- Saudi Women's Cup:

(gold) Champion: 2024–25
