= Abla Bensenouci =

Algerian footballer (born 2000)

Personal information
- Date of birth: 22 December 2000 (age 25)
- Place of birth: Oran, Algeria
- Position: Midfielder

Team information
- Current team: Eastern Flames

Youth career
- –2018: AS Intissar Oran

Senior career*
Years	Team	Apps	(Gls)
2018–2021	AS Intissar Oran	–	(–)
2021–2022	FC Constantine	–	(–)
2022–2025	Al-Ahli	25	(7)
2024–2025	→ Jeddah	14	(19)
2025–2026	Al-Hmmah Club	12	(9)
2025–2026	Eastern Flames		

International career^{‡}
2019	Algeria U20	–	(–)
2021–	Algeria	–	(–)
- * Club domestic league appearances and goals ‡ National team caps and goals as of 24 October 2022

Abla Bensenouci (Arabic: عبلة بن سنوسي; born 22 December 2000) is an Algerian footballer who plays as a midfielder for Saudi club Eastern Flames, and the Algeria national team.

== Club career ==
Bensenouci started playing football with AS Intissar Oran in her hometown of Oran. In 2021, she joined FC Constantine (now CS Constantine) and Al Ahli SFC of the Saudi Women's Premier League in 2022.

== International career ==
In 2019, Bensenouci represented the Algeria U-20 national team in the 2019 UNAF U-20 Women's Tournament.

In 2021, Bensenouci joined the senior Algeria women's national football team and took part in the 2021 Arab Women's Cup.

== Honours ==
Saudi Women's Premier League:

- Runners-up : 2023–24

SAFF Women's Cup:

- Champions : 2023–24
