= Majd Al-Otaibi =

Saudi footballer (born 2006)

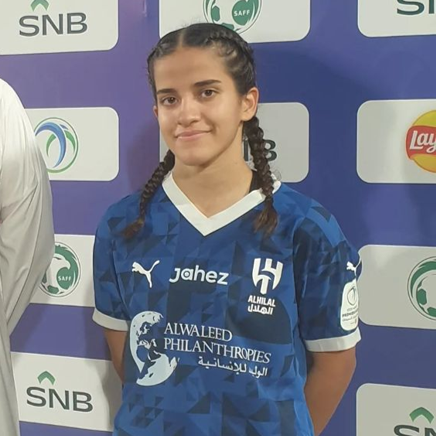
- Al-Otaibi with Al Hilal in 2024

Personal information
- Full name: Majd Fahad Galab Al Otaibi
- Date of birth: 4 December 2006 (age 19)
- Place of birth: Saudi Arabia
- Position: Defender

Team information
- Current team: Al-Ula
- Number: 18

Senior career*
Years	Team	Apps	(Gls)
2022–2023	Al Yamamah FC		
2023–2025	Al Hilal		
2025–	Al-Ula		

International career
2023	Saudi Arabia U17		
2024–	Saudi Arabia U20		
2023–	Saudi Arabia		
- * Club domestic league appearances and goals

Majd Fahad Galab Al Otaibi (Arabic: مَجْد فَهْد غَالِب الْعُتَيْبِيّ; born 4 December 2006) is a Saudi footballer who plays as a Defender for Saudi Women's Premier League club Al-Ula.

== Club career ==
Al-Otaibi started playing football at the age of six while studying in Cedar City, before returning to Saudi Arabia to play with Al Yamamah FC in the 2022/23 season of the Saudi Women's Premier League.

In August 2023, Al-Otaibi was sent to IMG Academy in the United States by the Saudi Arabian Football Federation.

On September 28, 2024, Al-Otaibi succeeded in assist for Ghanaian striker Mavis Owusu, as her team Al Hilal defeated Eastern Flames (4-0) in the Saudi Women's Premier League.

In August 2025, Al-Otaibi moved to Al-Ula.

== International career ==
In January 2023, Al-Otaibi achieved her first international title with the Saudi Arabia, The 2023 SAFF Women's International Friendly Tournament in Khobar.

In February 2023, Al-Otaibi was selected for the inaugural under-17 team to face Kuwait in double friendly matches.

In March 2023, with the under-20 team, head coach Pauline Hamill selected Al-Otaibi to play against Mauritania in double friendly matches, achieving their first international victory (3–0) in Jeddah.

== Personal life ==
Her sister, Najed Al-Otaibi, plays football in the Saudi Women's Premier League and the Saudi Women's First Division League.
