= Sofía Ochoa =

Mexican footballer (born 1995)

Personal information
- Full name: Sofía Melissa Ochoa Tello
- Date of birth: 17 November 1995 (age 30)
- Place of birth: Monterrey, Mexico
- Height: 1.63 m (5 ft 4 in)
- Position: Midfielder

Team information
- Current team: Eastern Flames
- Number: 2

Senior career*
Years	Team	Apps	(Gls)
2017–2018	Monterrey	18	(1)
2019	Santos Laguna	9	(0)
2019–2023	Houston Aces		
2023–	Eastern Flames	5	(0)
- * Club domestic league appearances and goals as of 30 December 2023

Sofía Melissa Ochoa Tello (born 17 November 1995) is a Mexican professional footballer who plays as a midfielder for Saudi Women's Premier League club Eastern Flames.

== Club career ==
=== Monterrey (2017–2019) ===
Ochoa was part of the newly founded women's section of the men's professional club Monterrey. She played the team's first-ever game as a starter scoring Monterrey's first goal against Necaxa, three minutes from the start of the game.

=== Santos Laguna (2019–2020) ===
In January 2019, Ochoa joined Liga MX Femenil side Santos Laguna to play the 2019–20 Liga MX Femenil season.

=== Houston Aces (2019–2023) ===
In late 2019, Ochoa went to the United States to play for the Houston Aces, her first time playing outside of Mexico, in the Women's Premier Soccer League.

=== Eastern Flames (2023–present) ===
In November 2023, it was announced by Eastern Flames that Ochoa had signed with the club for a one-season deal. she made her Premier League debut on 3 November 2023 in 0–3 loss to Al Nassr after she came as substitute for Ximena Mideros on the 23rd minute. she scored her first goal in 2023–24 SAFF Women's Cup in a 18–0 win over Saham, In that game, she also scored two more goals as she netted a hattrick.

== Career statistics ==
=== Club ===
As of match played 30 December 2023

Appearances and goals by club, season and competition
Club	Season	League			Cup		Continental		Other		Total	
Club	Season	Division	Apps	Goals	Apps	Goals	Apps	Goals	Apps	Goals	Apps	Goals
Monterrey	2017–18	LMXF	16	1	–	–	—		4	0	20	1
Monterrey	Total		16	1	–	–	—		4	0	20	1
Eastern Flames	2023–24	SWPL	5	0	2	3	—		—		7	3
Eastern Flames	Total		5	0	2	3	—		—		7	3
