= Lindsey Harris =

American soccer player (born 1993)

Personal information
- Full name: Lindsey Burke Harris
- Date of birth: November 19, 1993 (age 32)
- Place of birth: Houston, Texas, U.S.
- Height: 5 ft 7 in (1.70 m)
- Position: Goalkeeper

Team information
- Current team: Al-Ahli
- Number: 23

Youth career
- –2012: Westlake Chaparrals

College career
Years	Team	Apps	(Gls)
2012–2016	North Carolina Tar Heels	65	(0)

Senior career*
Years	Team	Apps	(Gls)
2017	FH	18	(0)
2018–2019	Klepp	44	(0)
2020–2022	Houston Dash	6	(0)
2023	Damaiense	1	(0)
2023	Portland Thorns FC	0	(0)
2023–2025	Al-Qadsiah	21	(0)
- * Club domestic league appearances and goals as of July 20, 2023

Lindsey Burke Harris (born November 19, 1993) is an American professional women's soccer player who plays as a goalkeeper for Al-Ahli of the Saudi Women's Premier League.

== College career ==
Harris played for the Tar Heels of the University of North Carolina at Chapel Hill from 2012 to 2016, redshirting during her freshman year. In total, she made 65 appearances and recorded 2 assists for the Tar Heels.

== Club career ==
Harris made her NWSL debut on April 9, 2021. She made her Liga BPI debut on May 6, 2023.

On July 20, 2023, Harris signed a short-term goalkeeper replacement contract with Portland Thorns FC after a knee injury to Thorns backup keeper Lauren Kozal. In October 2023, she joined Saudi club Al Qadsiah.

In her first season in Saudi Arabia, she won the award for Best Goalkeeper in the Saudi Women's Premier League and the SAFF Women's Cup.

Harris is widely considered the best goalkeeper in TST (The Soccer Tournament), having earned the 2024 and 2025 Women’s Golden Glove award. She led the US Women to success, including a third-place finish in 2024, set a tournament record with 43 saves in 2024, and is a two-time TST champion.

== Honours ==
Houston Dash

- NWSL Challenge Cup: 2020

Al-Qadsiah

- SAFF Women's Cup:
  - Third place (1): 2023–24

=== Individual ===
- SAFF Women's Cup Best goalkeeper: 2023–24.
- Saudi Women's Premier League Best goalkeeper: 2023–24.
