= Tahani Al-Zahrani =

Saudi footballer (born 1996)

Personal information
- Full name: Tahani Garmallah Al-Zahrani
- Date of birth: 11 February 1996 (age 30)
- Place of birth: Saudi Arabia
- Position: Defender

Team information
- Current team: Al-Hilal
- Number: 13

Senior career*
Years	Team	Apps	(Gls)
2020–2022	The White Lion team		
2022–2025	Al-Shabab		
2025–2026	Al-Ahli		
2026–	Al-Hilal		

International career
2022–	Saudi Arabia		
- * Club domestic league appearances and goals

Tahani Garmallah Al-Zahrani (Arabic: تهاني غرم الله الزهراني; born 11 February 1996) is a Saudi footballer who plays as a defender for Saudi Women's Premier League club Al-Hilal.

== Club career ==
Al-Zahrani began playing in community tournaments with The White Lion team.

She moved to Al-Shabab in 2022 to play in the Saudi Women's Premier League and finished third in the 2022/23 season.

In November 2022, She contributed to Al-Shabab winning the bronze medal in futsal at the 2022 Saudi Games in Riyadh.

In the following season 2023/24, Al-Zahrani formed a force for Al-Shabab in the left-back position, contributing to her team's second place in the SAFF Women's Cup.

In September 2025, Al-Ahli signed Al-Zahrani with a contract extending until 2026.

On July 2026, Al-Hilal signed Al-Zahrani to a contract running until 2028.

== International career ==
In February 2022, Al-Zahrani was named as part of the first-ever Saudi Arabia women's national football team for the two friendlies against Seychelles and Maldives.

== Honours ==
=== Club ===
Al-Shabab

- SAFF Women's Cup:

(silver) Second place: 2023–24

Individual

- Saudi Women's Premier League Team of the Season: 2023–24
