= Salma Al-Zubaidi =

Saudi footballer (born 2008)

Personal information
- Full name: Salma Mohammed Al-Zubaidi
- Date of birth: 17 December 2008 (age 17)
- Place of birth: Saudi Arabia
- Position: Defender

Team information
- Current team: Eastern Flames FC
- Number: 24

Senior career*
Years	Team	Apps	(Gls)
2023–	Eastern Flames FC		

International career
2024–	Saudi Arabia U17		
2024–	Saudi Arabia U20		
- * Club domestic league appearances and goals

Salma Mohammed Al-Zubaidi (Arabic: سلمى محمد الزبيدي; born 17 December 2008) is a Saudi footballer who plays as a defender for Saudi Women's Premier League club Eastern Flames FC.

== Club career ==
Al-Zubaidi played in some matches of the 2023-24 season of the Saudi Women's Premier League with Eastern Flames FC.

On 28 February 2024, Al-Zubaidi contributed with the U-17 team of Eastern Flames in claiming third place in SAFF Women's U-17 Tournament 2023–24.

== International career ==
In March 2024, Al-Zubaidi played with the under-20 team against Mauritania in double friendly matches in Jeddah. The next month, she played with the under-17 team against Guam in double friendly matches in Dammam.

== Honours ==
=== Club ===
Eastern Flames FC

- SAFF Women's U-17 Tournament (2023–24): Third place
