= Cynthia Konlan =

Ghanaian footballer

Personal information
- Full name: Cynthia Konlan Findib
- Date of birth: 29 November 2002 (age 23)
- Height: 1.78 m (5 ft 10 in)
- Position: Goalkeeper

Team information
- Current team: Al-Hilal
- Number: 24

Senior career*
Years	Team	Apps	(Gls)
2016–2022	Pearl Pia Ladies		
2022–2023	Swieqi United		
2023–	→ Al-Hilal (loan)	7	(0)

International career
2017–2018	Ghana U17	1	(0)
2021–2022	Ghana U20	3	(0)
2022–	Ghana	10	(0)
- * Club domestic league appearances and goals

Cynthia Konlan Findib (born 29 November 2002) is a Ghanaian professional footballer who plays as a goalkeeper for Saudi Women's Premier League club Al-Hilal and the Ghana national team.

== Club career ==
Konlan kicked off her football journey in Ghana at just 14, joining Pearl Pia Ladies in 2016. She held her position there until 2022.

=== Swieqi United, 2022–23 ===
In September 2022, the Maltese Women's First Division side Swieqi United signed Konlan. after she was part of the Ghanaian selection for the 2022 FIFA U-20 Women's World Cup held in Costa Rica. In May 2023, she extended her contract with Swieqi United for the next two seasons, as officially confirmed by the Assikura Women's League club on Friday. Konlan played a pivotal role in Swieqi United's recent triumph in the Assikura Women's Knockout stage. Throughout the season, she held on tight only conceding six goals. Konlan's impressive performance earned her the title of Malta Football Players Association Goalkeeper of the Year.

=== Al Hilal, 2023–present ===
In August 2023, Konlan signed a one-year loan deal with Al Hilal in Saudi Arabia, departing from her current club, Swieqi United FC. The announcement of her move was made on Facebook, with the club expressing excitement for her new journey in Season 23/24.

== International career ==
Cynthia was part of Ghana's under-17 team for the 2018 FIFA U-17 Women's World Cup squads. playing only one match, against Mexico coming on as a substitute in the 95th minutes to play penalties which they lost 2–4.

Konlan was included in the under-20 team's lineup for the 2022 FIFA U-20 Women's World Cup. playing two games in Ghana's group-stage exit.

Konlan received her first call-up to the senior national team for the friendly match against Morocco on 12 April 2022, but ultimately did not play. she made her national team debut against Benin on 19 February 2023, also in a friendly game. She made her senior debut for the Black Queens in 2023 and established herself as first-choice under coaches Nora Häuptle and Kim Björkegren. During qualification for the Paris 2024 Olympic Games she featured in Ghana's campaign and media engagements.

At the 2024 Women's Africa Cup of Nations (played in July 2025 in Morocco), Konlan was pivotal as Ghana reached the semi-finals for the first time since 2016. She saved two penalties in the quarter-final shoot-out win over Algeria after a 0–0 draw, earning widespread praise. She started Ghana's opener against South Africa and remained in goal throughout the tournament.

In August 2025, the GFA named Konlan one of two deputy captains of the senior team alongside Jennifer Cudjoe, under captain Portia Boakye.

== Style of play ==
Konlan is noted for her penalty-saving ability and command of her penalty area, attributes highlighted during Ghana's WAFCON 2024 quarter-final shoot-out against Algeria.

== Career statistics ==
=== Club ===
As of match played 30 December 2023

Appearances and goals by club, season and competition
Club	Season	League			Cup		Continental		Other		Total	
Club	Season	Division	Apps	Goals	Apps	Goals	Apps	Goals	Apps	Goals	Apps	Goals
Al Hilal	2023–24	SWPL	5	0	2	0	—		—		7	0
Al Hilal	Total		5	0	2	0	—		—		7	0

=== International ===
As of 5 December 2023

Ghana
Year	Apps	Goals
2022	0	0
2023	10	0
Total	10	0

== Honours ==
Swieqi United

- Assikura Women's Knock-Out: 2022–23

Ghana

- Women's Africa Cup of Nations third place: 2024

Individual

- MFPA Goalkeeper of the Year: 2022–23
- Pink Cup Goalkeeper Of The Tournament: 2026
