= Míriam Diéguez =

Spanish footballer (born 1986)

Míriam Diéguez de Oña
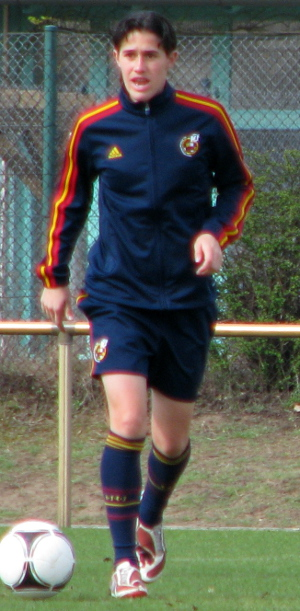
- Míriam Diéguez in 2012

Personal information
- Full name: Míriam Diéguez de Oña
- Date of birth: 4 May 1986 (age 40)
- Place of birth: Santa Coloma de Gramenet, Catalonia, Spain
- Height: 1.71 m (5 ft 7 in)
- Positions: Defender; midfielder

Team information
- Current team: Al-Riyadh

Youth career
- 1991–1995: ADV Santa Rosa
- 1995–1998: PB Trinitat Vella

Senior career*
Years	Team	Apps	(Gls)
1998–2002	Sant Gabriel		
2002–2010	Espanyol	104+	(11+)
2010–2011	Rayo Vallecano	18	(2)
2011–2017	Barcelona	140	(23)
2017–2018	Levante	30	(0)
2018–2019	Málaga	25	(0)
2019–2023	Alavés	45	(9)
2023–2024	Al-Riyadh		
2024–	CE Seagull		

International career
	Spain U19		(5)
2005–2016	Spain	30	(0)
2007–2019	Catalonia	2	(2)
- * Club domestic league appearances and goals as of 25 October 2021

Míriam Diéguez de Oña (born 4 May 1986), commonly known as Míriam, is a Spanish football midfielder who plays for Saudi club Al-Riyadh.

== Club career ==
Míriam played for Espanyol, Rayo Vallecano and FC Barcelona, winning the league with all three, as well as Málaga and Levante. She was Espanyol's captain during her later years with the team. She later played for Alavés, before joining Saudi club Al-Riyadh ahead of the 2023–24 season. Currently, she plays for CE Seagull in Badalona, in the fourth category of Spanish women's football.

== International career ==
Míriam won the 2004 U-19 European Championship and also represented Spain at the subsequent U-20 World Cup.

She appeared for the senior Spain women's national football team in a 2–2 home draw with Finland on 15 February 2005. In June 2013, national team coach Ignacio Quereda included Míriam in his Spain squad for UEFA Women's Euro 2013 in Sweden.

== Honours ==
Espanyol

- Primera División: 2005–06
- Copa de la Reina: 2006, 2009, 2010

Rayo Vallecano

- Primera División: 2010–11

Barcelona

- Primera División: 2011–12, 2012–13, 2013–14, 2014–15
- Copa de la Reina: 2013, 2014

Pio FC

- Queens League: 2023 (Summer split)
