= Cecilia Hagan =

Ghanaian footballer (born 2000)

Personal information
- Date of birth: 7 February 2000 (age 26)
- Place of birth: Ghana
- Height: 1.60 m (5 ft 3 in)
- Position: Defender

Team information
- Current team: Jeddah

Senior career*
Years	Team	Apps	(Gls)
2016–2021	Sea Lions		
2021–2022	Soccer Intellectuals	20	(0)
2022–2024	Al-Ahli	11	(4)
2024–	Jeddah	0	(0)

International career^{‡}
2016	Ghana U17	4	(0)
2017–2020	Ghana U20	3	(0)
- * Club domestic league appearances and goals as of 11 April 2020 ‡ National team caps and goals as of 30 December 2023

Cecilia Hagan (born 7 February 2000) is a Ghanaian professional footballer who plays as a defender for Saudi club Jeddah. she played previously for Ghana's youth national teams

== Club career ==
Hagan began playing football in Ghana for Bafana Ladies (now Seas Lions FC) and stayed with the club for five years.

In November 2021, Hagan joined Soccer Intellectuals after her contract with Sea Lions expired for a one-season deal. Hagan who played 17 of 18 matches, played 3 matches in the 2022–23 season before joining Saudi Women's Premier League side Al-Ahli.

=== Al-Ahli ===
Since joining Al-Ahli Saudi FC in October 2022, Hagan has consistently participated in matches, contributing to the team's performance in the 2022–23 season. in the 2023–24 season and namely in the 2023–24 SAFF Women's Cup, she netted a brace in Al-Ahli 17–0 against Al Bayraq, the club biggest win since its inception.

== International career ==
Hagan has represented Ghana on youth levels, namely under-17, and under-20 national teams. She was included in Ghana's squad for the 2016 FIFA U-17 Women's World Cup in Jordan. In 2018, she was selected to represent the under-20 team (Ghana Black Princess) in the 2018 FIFA U-20 Women's World Cup in France. since then till 2020 Hagan was called for most of the under-20 training camps and qualification matches.

Hagan is yet to make her senior debut, however, In December 2023, she was visited by the Black Queen's newly appointed coach Nora Häuptle in Saudi Arabia.

== Career statistics ==
=== Club ===
As of match played 30 December 2023

Appearances and goals by club, season and competition
Club	Season	League			Cup		Continental		Other		Total	
Club	Season	Division	Apps	Goals	Apps	Goals	Apps	Goals	Apps	Goals	Apps	Goals
Soccer Intellectuals	2021–22	GWPL	17	0	–	–	—		—		17	0
Soccer Intellectuals	2022–23	GWPL	3	0	–	–	—		—		3	0
Soccer Intellectuals	Total		20	0	–	–	—		—		20	0
Al-Ahli	2022–23	SWPL	8	2	–	–	—		—		8	2
Al-Ahli	2023–24	SWPL	2	0	1	2	—		—		3	2
Al-Ahli	Total		10	2	1	2	—		—		11	4
Career total			30	2	1	2	—		—		31	4

== Honours ==
Al-Ahli

- SAFF Women's Cup: 2023–24
