= Jeddah Club (women) =

Saudi women's football club

- Full name: Jeddah Women's Sports Club
- Founded: 2023; 3 years ago
- Ground: Prince Abdullah Al-Faisal Stadium
- Capacity: 27,000
- League: Saudi Women's First Division League
- 2023–24: SW1DL, 8th of 12
Home colours	Away colours

Jeddah Women's Sports Club, also known as Jeddah Ladies (Arabic: سيدات جدة), is a Saudi professional women's association football club based in Jeddah. It is the women's section of the Jeddah Club. The club currently plays in the Saudi Women's First Division League.

== History ==
Founded in 2023, the club replaced Jeddah Pride's Academy and signed most of its players, joining the Saudi Women's First Division League, the second tier of Saudi women's football. They were placed in the west group alongside Najmt Jeddah, Al-Nors, Saham, and NEOM FC. The team topped the group with seven wins out of eight, qualifying for the final stages. Despite their strong performance, they lost one match and drew another, failing to secure promotion to the Premier League and remaining in the First Division.

The club competed in the inaugural edition of the SAFF Women's Cup, where they were defeated 8–0 by finalist Al-Shabab in the round of 16.

== Players and staff ==
=== Current squad ===
As of 18 October 2024

Note: Flags indicate national team as defined under FIFA eligibility rules; some limited exceptions apply. Players may hold more than one non-FIFA nationality.

No.	Pos.	Nation	Player
1	GK	KSA	Bashayer Al-Ruqi
2	DF	KSA	Jana Azayah
3	DF	KSA	Maya Kaki
5	MF	KSA	Joudy Abduldaim
6	DF	KSA	Jawharah Binbattal
7	MF	KSA	Hala Al-Baqami
8	MF	ALG	Abla Bensenouci (Captain)
9	FW	KSA	Shomokh Al-Hawsawi
11	MF	KSA	Retaj Al-Shamrani
12	DF	KSA	Maha Badroun
13	MF	KSA	Sara Quotah
14	DF	GHA	Cecilia Hagan
15	MF	KSA	Mawadh Al-Zaidi

No.	Pos.	Nation	Player
16	MF	GER	Emilia Salvador
17	DF	KSA	Waad Oqebi
18	DF	KSA	Nouf Al-Mhayawi
20	DF	KSA	Najat Fallatah
22	GK	KSA	Mada Al-Muwlad
23	DF	KSA	Mariya Kaki
24	MF	KSA	Amal Hazizi
55	DF	ENG	Molly Edwards
99	DF	KSA	Nahlah Mahmoud
—	GK	KSA	Jammalah Allahji
—	MF	KSA	Balqees Sadagah
—	DF	KSA	Dhay Al-Harthi

=== Coaching staff ===
Position	Name
Head coach	(Saudi Arabia) Wali Hakami
Assistant coaches	(Saudi Arabia) Mustafa Adam (Saudi Arabia) Waleed K. Bakhsh
Player development coach	(Saudi Arabia) Mutair Al-Ghamdi
Goalkeeping coach	(Saudi Arabia) Waleed Bakhsh
Fitness coach	(Saudi Arabia) Yazid Dellen
Technical director	(Saudi Arabia) Bandar Al-Thobeti
Lead analyst	(Saudi Arabia) Omar Abdu
