= Al-Riyadh SC (women) =

Saudi women's football club

Al Riyadh
- Full name: Al-Riyadh Saudi Women's Club
- Founded: 2022; 4 years ago
- Ground: Inaya Medical Colleges Stadium; Riyadh, Saudi Arabia
- Head coach: Ana Junyent
- League: Saudi Women's Premier League
- 2023–24: SWPL, 8th of 8
Home colours	Away colours

Al-Riyadh Saudi Women's Club, commonly known as Al-Riyadh Ladies (Arabic: سيدات الرياض) is a Saudi women's professional football club, representing Al-Riyadh SC. It competed in Saudi Women's Premier League, following promotion in the 2022–23 season, achieved by winning the First Division League.

== History ==
=== The beginning of the Football Journey ===
after the inception of the Saudi Women's Premier League and the development of Women's sport in Saudi Arabia, Al-Riyadh SC created their own women's team in 2022, The team subsequently took part in the inaugural Saudi Women's First Division League, securing victory by topping the Capital Riyadh group stage without conceding a single goal. The team continued its success, winning both the quarter-final and semi-final matches, ultimately reaching the final. In the final, they emerged triumphant against Al Mutahed, winning 2–1 on penalties after a 1–1 draw at full time.

After securing promotion to the Premier League, the club enlisted a Spanish staff to guide the first division towards success in the top tier. Specifically, Ana Junyent was appointed as the senior team coach, and María Coisada took on the role of goalkeeping coach. Additionally, three Spanish players were swiftly signed, including Míriam Diéguez, Carla Gómez Torres, and Aroa León Gómez.

== Season to season ==
Season	Div.	Pos.	SAFF Women's Cup
2022/23	2ª	1st	N/A
2023/24	1ª	8th	Quarter-finals
2024/25	2ª	TBD	Round of 16

== Players (2024) ==
As of 18 October 2024

Note: Flags indicate national team as defined under FIFA eligibility rules; some limited exceptions apply. Players may hold more than one non-FIFA nationality.

No.	Pos.	Nation	Player
1	GK	KSA	Zahrah Bahmaid
2	DF	KSA	Najd Al-Otaibi
6	MF	KSA	Atheer Abdulaziz
7	MF	KSA	Mashael Khamis
8	MF	KSA	Ola Al-Msoud
9	MF	KSA	Khloud Ahmed
10	FW	KSA	Dina Huwaydi
11	FW	GHA	Elizabeth Addo
13	DF	KSA	Mayan Al-Aqeel
14	MF	KSA	Fay Al-Humaidan
15	DF	KSA	Fai Raja
18	MF	NGR	Rita Chikwelu

No.	Pos.	Nation	Player
19	FW	CMR	Henriette Akaba
20	MF	KSA	Alanoud Al-Shammari
22	GK	KSA	Noura Hamad
24	MF	KSA	Mashael Abdulmohsen
28	FW	NGR	Joy Jerry
29	MF	KSA	Zakiah Saleh
66	DF	KSA	Lulu Takroni
94	DF	EGY	Omnia Mahmoud
—	GK	KSA	Khulud Al Mutariri
—	MF	KSA	Dalla Binnassar
—	FW	KSA	Razan Al-Qahtany

=== Former players ===
- (Algeria) Djamila Marek
- (Brazil) Rafa Travalão
- (Spain) Míriam Diéguez
- (Spain) Carla Gómez
- (Spain) Aroa León
- (Tunisia) Soulaima Jabrani

== Honours ==
- Saudi Women's First Division League:
  - Champions (1; record): 2022–23
