= Darko Stojanović =

Serbian football coach

Personal information
- Date of birth: August 21, 1970 (age 56)
- Place of birth: Lazarevac, Serbia

Managerial career
- Years: Team
- 2010–2012: Serbia U17
- 2011–2012: ŽFK Crvena zvezda
- 2013–2018: ŽFK Crvena zvezda
- 2023–present: Al Hilal

Darko Stojanović (Serbian: Дарко Стојановић; born 21 August 1970) is a Serbian professional football coach who is the head coach of Al Hilal in the Saudi Women's Premier League.

== Coaching career ==
=== ŽFK Crvena zvezda ===
After its founding in 2011, Stojanović took the roles of team head coach and manager. He was temporarily removed from the coaching position for a year due to FSS suspension. While at Crvena, Stojanović played a crucial role in facilitating an agreement between Daniel Nister, an assistant German coach of Serbian origin currently supporting Wolfsburg women, and Jovana Damnjanović.

=== Al Hilal ===
In August 2023, It was announced that Stojanović was appointed as head coach for Al Hilal women's team.

After securing three consecutive victories from the 5th to the 7th round, Stojanović was named the best coach for the month of December.

== Managerial statistics ==
As of 27 January 2024

Managerial record by team and tenure
Team	Nation	From	To	Record							
Team	Nation	From	To	P	W	D	L	GF	GA	GD	Win %
Al Hilal	Saudi Arabia	August 2023	present	15	7	2	6	32	21	+11	46.67
Career totals				15	7	2	6	32	21	+11	46.67

== Honours ==
ŽFK Crvena zvezda

- Serbian Women's Super League Runners-up: 2011–12, 2014–15, 2016–17, 2017–18
