= Manar Fraij =

Jordanian footballer (born 1988)

Personal information
- Full name: Manar Mustafa Ahmed Fraij
- Date of birth: 29 April 1988 (age 38)
- Place of birth: Amman, Jordan
- Position: Forward

Team information
- Current team: Jordan (assistant coach); Al-Ahli (head coach)

International career
Years	Team	Apps	(Gls)
2009	Jordan	1	(0)

Managerial career
- 2016: Jordan U14
- 2016–2018: Jordan U16
- 2018–2022: Shabab Al-Ordon
- 2022: Jordan (assistant)
- 2022–: Al-Ahli

Manar Mustafa Ahmed Fraij (Arabic: منار مصطفى أحمد فريج; born 29 April 1988) is a Jordanian football coach and former player who is the assistant coach of the Jordan women's national team, and head coach of Saudi club Al-Ahli. She played as a forward internationally for Jordan.

== Managerial career ==
In February 2022, Fraij was appointed assistant coach to David Nascimento of the Jordan women's national team.

== Honours ==
Shabab Al-Ordon

- Jordan Women's Pro League: 2019
- Women's Jordan Cup: 2019
- WAFF Women's Clubs Championship: 2019

Al-Ahli

- SAFF Women's Cup: 2023–24, 2024–25
