= Carla Gómez =

Spanish footballer

Personal information
- Full name: Carla Gómez Torres
- Date of birth: 28 February 1994 (age 32)
- Place of birth: Terrassa, Spain
- Height: 1.57 m (5 ft 2 in)
- Position: Midfielder

Team information
- Current team: Ultimate Móstoles
- Number: 8

Youth career
- 2009–2010: Espanyol
- 2010–2012: Barcelona

Senior career*
Years	Team	Apps	(Gls)
2012–2015	CE Sant Gabriel	78	(18)
2015–2016	UD Granadilla Tenerife	30	(4)
2016–2017	Zaragoza	29	(2)
2017–2020	Santa Teresa	36	(1)
2020–2021	Real Unión de Tenerife	24	(5)
2021–2022	Real Oviedo	30	(1)
2022–2023	Racing de Santander	26	(4)
2023–2024	Al-Riyadh	14	(2)
- * Club domestic league appearances and goals as of 30 December 2023

Carla Gómez Torres (born 28 February 1994) is a Spanish professional footballer who plays as a midfielder for Ultimate Móstoles in the Queens League.

== Career ==
Carla Gómez developed in the youth teams of RCD Espanyol and FC Barcelona. Between 2012 and 2015, she played for CE Sant Gabriel, where she played in the Primera División and scored 14 goals in the 2014–15 season where she finished top 7 in the top scorers. In the summer of 2015, she signed with Canary Islands based team UD Granadilla Tenerife., where she stayed for only one season. The following year she joined Zaragoza. From 2017 to 2020 she played for Santa Teresa, In June 2018, she extended her contract with the club for few more seasons. in the 2020–21 season, she played for Real Unión de Tenerife. On 4 June 2021, Tenerife announced the departure of Gómez from the team. In the following two years, she has played for Real Oviedo and Racing de Santander.

In September 2023, Al-Riyadh announced the signing of Gómez for one season. On 4 November 2023, she debuted for the team coming as a substitute in the 65th minute in a 4–0 loss to Al-Hilal. She scored her first goal for the team in the round of 16 of 2023–24 SAFF Women's Cup match against Al-Hmmah.
