= Sara Al-Hamad =

Saudi footballer (born 1992)

Sara Al-hamad
Personal information
- Date of birth: 27 June 1992 (age 34)
- Place of birth: Riyadh, Saudi Arabia
- Position: Midfielder

Team information
- Current team: Al-Nassr
- Number: 8

Senior career*
Years	Team	Apps	(Gls)
2019–2021	Sama	+6	(+8)
2023	Al-Yamamah	14	(0)
2023–	Al-Nassr	20	(4)

International career^{‡}
2021–	Saudi Arabia Futsal	11	(1)
2022–	Saudi Arabia	19	(0)
- * Club domestic league appearances and goals as of 30 December 2023 ‡ National team caps and goals as of 12 January 2024

Sara Al-Hamad (Arabic: سَارَة مُحَمَّد فَهْد الْحَمَد; born 27 June 1992) is a Saudi professional footballer who plays as a midfielder for Saudi Women's Premier League club Al-Nassr and the Saudi Arabia national team.

== Club career ==
=== Al-Yamamah ===
Prior to the launch of the inaugural 2022–23 Saudi Women's Premier League, Al-Hamad joined Al-Yamamah coming from Sama whom she used to captain. She with Al-Yamamah finished fourth overall in the season standings. She also represented Al-Yamamah futsal team in the Ramadan women's futsal championship, in which Al-Yamamah were crowned champions.

=== Al-Nassr ===
In April 2023, after Al-Shabab acquired Al-Yamamah, Al-Hamad signed with Al-Nassr. In December 2023, and after the conclusion of the first half of the season, Al-Hamad was named the best player in the month.

== International career ==
Hamad was part of the first FIFA recognized Saudi Arabia national team, She made her debut for the team in their first international game, a 2–0 win over Seychelles.

== Career statistics ==
=== Club ===
As of match played 30 December 2023

Appearances and goals by club, season and competition
Club	Season	League			Cup		Continental		Other		Total	
Club	Season	Division	Apps	Goals	Apps	Goals	Apps	Goals	Apps	Goals	Apps	Goals
Al-Yamamah	2022–23	SWPL	14	0	—		—		—		14	1
Al-Yamamah	Total		14	0	—		—		—		14	0
Al-Nassr	2023–24	SWPL	7	1	2	0	—		5	1	14	2
Al-Nassr	Total		7	1	2	0	—		5	1	14	2
Career total			21	0	2	0	—		5	1	28	2

=== International ===
Statistics accurate as of match played 8 January 2024.

Year	Saudi Arabia	
Year	Apps	Goals
2022	4	0
2023	13	0
2024	1	0
Total	18	0

== Honours ==
Al-Nassr

- Saudi Women's Premier League: 2023–24
- Saudi–Jordanian Women's Clubs Championship third place: 2023

Saudi Arabia

- SAFF Women's International Friendly Tournament Winner: Khobar 2023

Individual

- Saudi Women's Premier League Player of the Month: December 2023
