= Naomie Kabakaba =

Congolese footballer

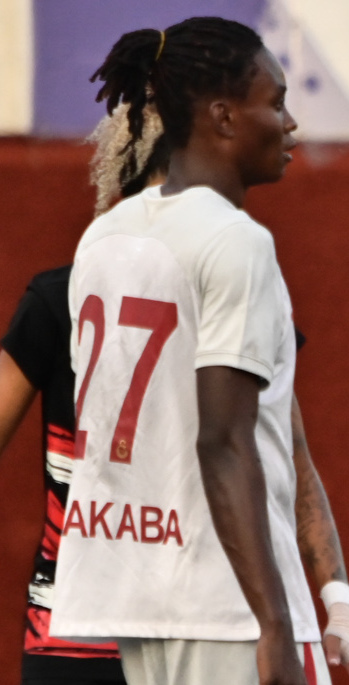
- Kabakaba in 2023

Personal information
- Full name: Naomie Kabakaba Nsiala
- Date of birth: 4 February 1998 (age 28)
- Position: Winger

Team information
- Current team: Al Ahli

Senior career*
Years	Team	Apps	(Gls)
–2019	FCF Bafana Bafana		
2019–202?	OCL City		
202?–2023	TP Mazembe		
2023–2024	Galatasaray	11	(10)
2024–	Al-Ahli	35	(44)

International career^{‡}
2019–	DR Congo	11	(6)
- * Club domestic league appearances and goals ‡ National team caps and goals as of 24 February 2025.

Naomie Kabakaba Nsiala (born 4 February 1998) is a Congolese footballer who plays as a winger for Al-Ahli and the DR Congo national team.

== Club career ==
Kabakaba has played for FCF Bafana Bafana and OCL City in the Democratic Republic of the Congo.

=== Galatasaray ===
On 4 February 2023, she transferred to the Turkish Women's Football Super League team Galatasaray.

=== Al-Ahli ===
On 26 January 2024, she signed with Saudi Women's Premier League side Al-Ahli to be the first Congolese to play in the league.

== International career ==
Kabakaba capped for the DR Congo at senior level during the 2020 CAF Women's Olympic Qualifying Tournament (third round).

=== International goals ===
Scores and results list DR Congo's goal tally first

No.	Date	Venue	Opponent	Score	Result	Competition	Ref.
1	24 February 2020	Estadio de Ebibeyin, Ebibeyin, Equatorial Guinea	Chad	3–0	4–2	2020 UNNIFAC Women's Cup	
2	24 February 2020	Estadio de Ebibeyin, Ebibeyin, Equatorial Guinea	Chad	4–0	4–2	2020 UNNIFAC Women's Cup	

== Honours ==
Al-Ahli

- SAFF Women's Cup: 2023–24, 2024–25

== Career statistics ==
=== Club ===
Club	Season	Division	League		Cup		Continental		Total	
Club	Season	Division	Apps	Goals	Apps	Goals	Apps	Goals	Apps	Goals
Mazembe	2022-23	RDC Women's Championship					3	0	3	0
Galatasaray	2023-24	Turkish Women's Super Lig	11	10					11	10
Al Ahli	2023-24	Saudi Women's Premier League	6	10					6	10
Al Ahli	2024-25	Saudi Women's Premier League	17	21	2	7			19	28
Al Ahli	2025-26	Saudi Women's Premier League	12	13	4	3			16	16
Al Ahli	Total		35	44	6	10			41	54
Total career			46	54	6	10	3	0	55	64

== See also ==
- List of Democratic Republic of the Congo women's international footballers
