= Omnia Mahmoud =

Egyptian footballer (born 1994)

Omnia Mahmoud أمنية محمود (Arabic)
Personal information
- Full name: Omnia Mahmoud Abdelhamid Mahmoud
- Date of birth: 6 February 1994 (age 32)
- Position: Midfielder

Team information
- Current team: Al-Riyadh

Senior career*
Years	Team	Apps	(Gls)
–2022	Wadi Degla		
2022–2023	Al Yamamah		
2023–	Al-Riyadh		

International career^{‡}
2016	Egypt	2	(0)
- * Club domestic league appearances and goals ‡ National team caps and goals as of 25 November 2016.

Omnia Mahmoud Abdelhamid Mahmoud (Arabic: أمنية محمود عبد الحميد محمود; born 6 February 1994) is an Egyptian footballer who plays as a midfielder. She has been a member of the Egypt women's national team.

== Club career ==
Mahmoud has played for Wadi Degla in Egypt.

== International career ==
Mahmoud capped for Egypt at senior level during the 2016 Africa Women Cup of Nations.
