= Samia Aouni =

Tunisian footballer (born 1992)

Personal information
- Date of birth: 30 May 1992 (age 34)
- Height: 1.67 m (5 ft 6 in)
- Position: Left back

Team information
- Current team: Hồ Chí Minh City

Senior career*
Years	Team	Apps	(Gls)
2021–2022	Amman		
2022–2024	Al Nassr	12	(5)
2025–	Hồ Chí Minh City	3	(0)

International career
- Tunisia
- * Club domestic league appearances and goals

Samia Aouni (Arabic: سامية عوني; born 30 May 1992) is a Tunisian footballer who plays as a left-back for Vietnamese club Hồ Chí Minh City and the Tunisia women's national team.

== Club career ==
Aouni has played for Amman in Jordan.

In October 2025, Aouni signed for Vietnamese side Hồ Chí Minh City to compete in the 2025–26 AFC Women's Champions League.

== International career ==
Aouni has capped for Tunisia at senior level, including two friendly away wins over Jordan in June 2021.

=== International goals ===
Scores and results list Tunisia's goal tally first

No.	Date	Venue	Opponent	Score	Result	Competition	Ref.
1	27 August 2021	Police Academy Stadium, Cairo, Egypt	Sudan	1	12–1	2021 Arab Women's Cup	
2	22 February 2022	Estadio de Malabo, Malabo, Equatorial Guinea	Equatorial Guinea	1	2–3	2022 Africa Women Cup of Nations qualification	

== Honours ==
Amman

- AFC Women's Club Championship: 2021

Al Nassr

- Saudi Women's Premier League: 2022–23, 2023–24

== See also ==
- List of Tunisia women's international footballers
