= Malak Shannak =

Jordanian footballer

Personal information
- Full name: Malak Khaled Abed Shannak
- Date of birth: 1 August 1998 (age 28)
- Place of birth: Amman, Jordan
- Position: Goalkeeper

Team information
- Current team: Al-Ittihad

Senior career*
Years	Team	Apps	(Gls)
–2021	Amman		
2021–22	Amed S.F.K.		
2022	Orthodox Club		
2022–2024	Al-Ittihad	6	(0)

International career^{‡}
2016	Jordan U19	1	(0)
2018–	Jordan	20	(0)
- * Club domestic league appearances and goals ‡ National team caps and goals as of 8 April 2025

Malak Khaled Abed Shannak (Arabic: ملك شنك; born 1 August 1998) is a Jordanian footballer who plays as a goalkeeper for the Saudi Women's Premier League club Al-Ittihad and the Jordan women's national team.
