= Jessica Aby =

Ivorian footballer

Personal information
- Full name: Jessica Romuald Emmanuella Aby
- Date of birth: 16 June 1998 (age 28)
- Place of birth: Abidjan, Ivory Coast
- Height: 1.77 m (5 ft 10 in)
- Position: Forward

Senior career*
Years	Team	Apps	(Gls)
- Onze Sœurs de Gagnoa
2019	Barcelona FA	6	(0)
2019–2020	Pyrgos Limassol	12	(0)
2021–2022	Logroño	27	(6)
2022–2023	Alavés	3	(0)
2023–2025	Al Qadsiah	5	(1)

International career^{‡}
2015	Ivory Coast	8	(0)
- * Club domestic league appearances and goals as of 28 May 2022 ‡ National team caps and goals as of 11:57, 16 June 2015 (UTC)

Jessica Romuald Emmanuella Aby (born 16 June 1998), also known as Emmanuella Aby, is an Ivorian professional footballer who plays as a forward. ·

== Club career ==
Aby played for Barcelona FA and Pyrgos Limassol in Cyprus, Logroño and Alavés in Spain, before joining Saudi club Al Qadsiah in October 2023. On On 9 August 2024, the Khobar-based club renewed her contract until 2026. She left the club on 29 January 2025.

== International career ==
Aby was part of the Ivorian squad for the 2015 FIFA Women's World Cup.

== See also ==
- List of Ivory Coast women's international footballers
