= Rafa Travalão =

Brazilian footballer

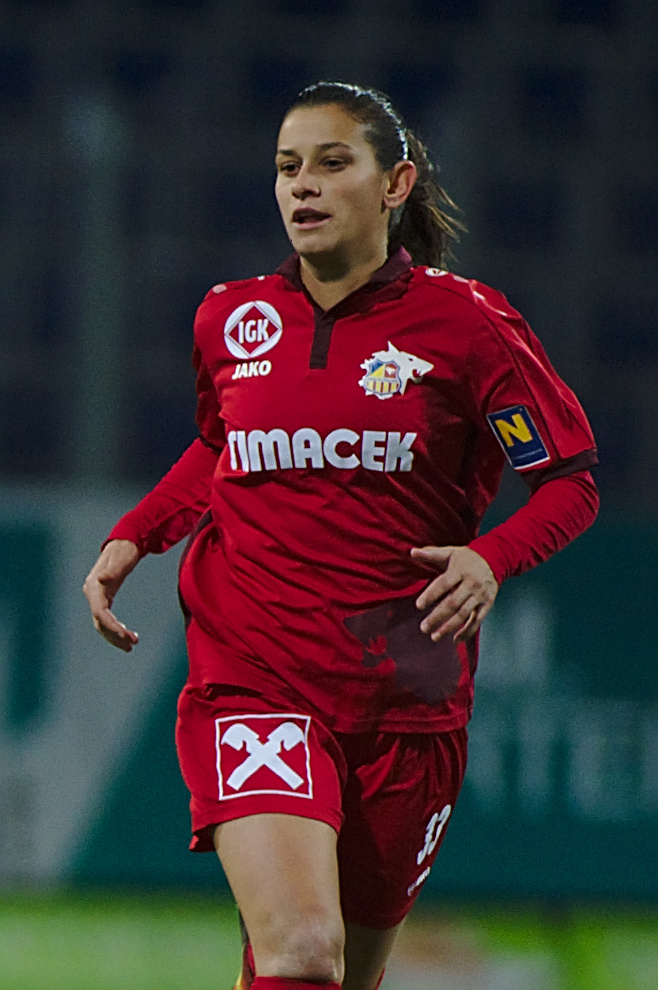
- Rafa Travalão in 2016

Personal information
- Full name: Rafaela de Miranda Travalão
- Date of birth: 18 August 1988 (age 38)
- Place of birth: Promissão, São Paulo, Brazil
- Height: 1.56 m (5 ft 1 in)
- Position: Midfielder

Team information
- Current team: Atlético Mineiro

Senior career*
Years	Team	Apps	(Gls)
2004–2005	Marília Atlético Clube		
2006–2009	Botucatu		
2010	Foz Cataratas		
2011	Santos FC		
2012–2013	XV de Novembro		
2014	Ferroviária	11	(5)
2015	Boston Breakers	13	(0)
2015	Flamengo	5	(2)
2016	Corinthians	3	(0)
2016	St. Pölten-Spratzern	7	(2)
2017–2019	Ferroviária	16	(0)
2019	Abu Dhabi		
2020–2021	Internacional	36	(11)
2022–2023	São Paulo	28	(10)
2023–2024	Al-Riyadh		(0)
2023–2024	Atlético Mineiro		

International career^{‡}
2013–2015	Brazil	7	(1)
- * Club domestic league appearances and goals as of 17 July 2018 ‡ National team caps and goals as of 23 June 2015

Rafaela de Miranda Travalão (born 18 August 1988), known as Rafa Travalão or Rafinha, is a Brazilian footballer currently playing for Atlético Mineiro.

== Club career ==
She played for the Boston Breakers of the National Women's Soccer League in the 2015 season. She was waived by the Boston Breakers in October 2015.

In 2016, she joined Austrian ÖFB-Frauenliga club St. Pölten-Spratzern. In 2017, Rafinha joined Ferroviária in Brazil.

In October 2019, she participated in the WAFF Women's Clubs Championship with Abu Dhabi, where she scored a goal in a 2–1 win over Riffa, followed by a hat-trick in an 11–0 thrashing of Arab Orthodox.

Rafinha later played for Internacional and São Paulo, before joining Saudi club Al-Riyadh in November 2023.

== International career ==
In July 2013 Rafinha represented Brazil at the 2013 Summer Universiade in Kazan, Russia. She made her senior debut in September 2013, against New Zealand at the 2013 Valais Women's Cup. At the 2014 South American Games, Rafinha scored the winning goal in Brazil's 2–1 win over Colombia. On the eve of the 2015 FIFA Women's World Cup, Rafina was called into Brazil's squad as a replacement for Érika, who had sustained a knee injury.

=== International goals ===
Goal	Date	Location	Opponent	#	Score	Result	Competition
goal 1	2014-03-16	Santiago, Chile	Colombia	1.1	1–0	2–1	South American Games 2014

== Honors ==
Ferroviária

Winner

- Campeonato Brasileiro de Futebol Feminino: 2014

Runners-up

- Campeonato Paulista de Futebol Feminino: 2014
