= Elizabeth Addo =

Ghanaian footballer (born 1993)

Personal information
- Full name: Elizabeth Addo
- Date of birth: 1 September 1993 (age 33)
- Place of birth: Accra, Ghana
- Height: 1.62 m (5 ft 4 in)
- Position: Forward

Team information
- Current team: Al-Nahda

Youth career
- 2003–2006: Tesano Ladies F.C.

Senior career*
Years	Team	Apps	(Gls)
2007–2012	Athleta Ladies F.C.	59	(27)
2012–2014	Rivers Angels F.C.	24	(12)
2014–2015	ŽFK Spartak Subotica	3	(0)
2015–2016	Ferencvárosi TC	34	(22)
2016–2017	Kvarnsvedens IK	29	(7)
2018	Seattle Reign FC	13	(0)
2018	→ Western Sydney (loan)	8	(2)
2019–2020	Jiangsu Suning	0	(0)
2020	Apollon Ladies	0	(0)
2021	North Carolina Courage	0	(0)
2021	Djurgårdens IF	20	(1)
2022	Beşiktaş		
2022–2024	Al Hilal	18	(12)
2024–2025	Al-Riyadh	15	(31)
2025	Al-Nahda	5	(6)

International career
2007	Ghana U-14	3	(1)
2008	Ghana U-17	9	(5)
2008–2012	Ghana U-20	18	(6)
2011	Ghana U-23	8	(5)
2012–	Ghana	25	(10)
- * Club domestic league appearances and goals

Elizabeth Addo (born 1 September 1993) is a Ghanaian football forward who plays for Saudi club Al-Nahda. She is also the captain of the Ghana women's national football team.

== Club career ==
Addo began her career in Ghana, playing for Tesano Ladies F.C. in 2003 and later signed for Athleta Ladies F.C locally known as "Ashaiman Ladies" based in Ashaiman in the year 2007–2012. She spent couple of seasons there and later joined Nigerian giant side Rivers Angels F.C. from 2012 to 2014. Her performance helped the team win the 2012–13 Nigerian Women Football League and 2013–14 Nigerian Women Football League under Rivers Angels F.C. manager Edwin Okon. The Port Harcourt women, doubled the lead in the 56th minute after a beautiful interplay in Amazon's 18-yard box was scored by Addo.

Addo returned to Ghana in 2014 and later joined ŽFK Spartak Subotica in Serbia the same year.

=== Ferencvárosi TC, 2015–16 ===
In 2015, Addo moved back to Europe and joined Hungarian giant Ferencvárosi TC in Budapest Hungary. She was an integral part of the first team under manager Balázs Dörnyei and won the 2015–16 Hungarian Női NB I league title and Hungarian Women's Cup in 2016.

Addo was considered one of the team's top three players. She played 27 league matches and scored 17 goals helping her team winning the Hungarian Női NB I League title. She scored the equalizing goal in the 89th minute against rival MTK which turned the score line Ferencvárosi TC 1–1 MTK. Her equalizing goal helped her club qualify for the Hungarian FA Cup finals on penalties. She played the full 90 minutes for her side to defeat Honved 5–0 in the finals.

Addo played for Club Ferencváros in the 2015–16 UEFA Women's Champions League and placed second during the group stage. In 2016, Addo was one of three players shortlisted for the 2015–16 Női NB I Women Footballer of the Year award.

=== Kvarnsvedens IK, 2016–2017 ===
In August 2016, Damallsvenskan League side Kvarnsvedens IK signed Addo who had joined the club on a free transfer. Addo has played 8 games in the league, where she scored 5 goals for Kvarnsvedens IK. She had her name marked in the Sweden Damallsvenskan Best XII of the month of September 2016.

=== Seattle Reign and loan to Western Sydney Wanderers, 2018 ===
Addo had signed a contract to join the Boston Breakers in the NWSL, however the Breakers folded ahead of the 2018 season. She was chosen by the Seattle Reign in the Dispersal Draft with the 8th pick.

On 11 October 2018, Addo was signed on loan to the Western Sydney Wanderers for the W-League 2018–2019 season.

=== Jiangsu Suning ===
In April 2019, Chinese Women's Super League side Jiangsu Suning signed her on a 1-year deal after parting ways with Seattle Reign after her contract ended where she joined her former teammate, Tabitha Chawinga at Swedish club Kvarnsvedens. Her stay with the club ended faster than it should unfortunately due to the COVID-19 pandemic in 2020. Whilst at the club she played 14 matches, scored 5 times and made 10 assists. Within that short stint with the club she won 4 trophies, The Chinese Women's Super League, Women's FA Cup, FA Tournament and the Women's Super Cup. Addo was a core part of the team that placed 2nd in the maiden AFC Women's Club Championship in her debut season.

=== Apollon Ladies ===
After playing for one year in the Chinese Women's Super League Addo, signed for Cypriot top-flight side Apollon Ladies FC in 2020. Addo made her debut for Cyprus side Apollon Ladies FC on 4 November 2020 in their 3–0 win over Swansea Ladies in the UEFA Women's Champions League first qualifying round.

=== North Carolina Courage, 2021 ===
On 18 January 2021, Addo returned to the United States following a move to National Women's Soccer League club North Carolina Courage on a one-year deal, with an option of a 12-month extension.

=== Djurgårdens IF ===
In April 2021, she joined Djurgårdens IF. She left the team after the season. She made 20 appearances and scored one goal in Damallsvenskan for the team.

=== Beşiktaş ===
In March 2022, Addo signed for Turkish club Beşiktaş.

=== Al Hilal ===
In December 2022, Addo joined Saudi Women's Premier League club Al Hilal.

== International career ==
=== Youth team ===
Addo has been a full international for Ghana since 2007. At the age of 14, she starred with the under-14 national team at the 2007 FIFA U-14 Women's World Cup held in Switzerland and captained the team to finals and eventually the championship .

She captained Ghana at the 2008 FIFA U-17 Women's World Cup held in New Zealand and was the deputy captain for Ghana's U17 female team (Black Maidens) at the 2010 2010 FIFA U-17 Women's World Cup. Addo was part of the national team which competed in the 2010 FIFA U-20 Women's World Cup held in Germany and competed at the 2012 FIFA U-20 Women's World Cup held in Japan.

=== Senior team ===
She was also part of the national team which competed in the 2014 African Women's Championship qualification. She was among Ghana Squared which faced Cameroon for 2016 Rio Olympic Games qualifier at Accra Sports Stadium -Ghana She played in a friendly match against Germany on 22 July 2016. 12 April 2016, she played a key role in Ghana qualifying for the 2016 Africa Women Cup of Nations. She led the Ghanaian team as captain to the Third place position in the 2016 Africa Women Cup of Nations. She won two man of the matches awards and scored 3 goals in the Tournament to finish as the 3rd top scorer and the top scorer for the Ghanaian team. Due to her exploits at the tournament she was named in the Team of the Tournament. She was part of the Ghanaian team to the 2018 Africa Women Cup of Nations hosted in Ghana. In March 2020, she was part of the Ghanaian team that participated in the 2020 Turkish Women's Cup which is an annual invitational women's football tournament played in Turkey. She led the team to finish 2nd in their group whilst placing 3rd overall in the competition to win the bronze medal and a trophy.

== International goals ==
No.	Date	Venue	Opponent	Score	Result	Competition
1.	12 April 2015	Rufaro Stadium, Harare, Zimbabwe	Zimbabwe	2–1	2–2	2015 African Games qualification
2.	31 May 2015	Accra Sports Stadium, Accra, Ghana	Egypt	3–0	3–0	2015 CAF Women's Olympic qualifying tournament
3.	20 November 2016	Stade Municipal de Limbe, Limbe, Cameroon	Kenya	2–1	3–1	2016 Women's Africa Cup of Nations
4.	23 November 2016	Stade Municipal de Limbe, Limbe, Cameroon	Nigeria	1–1	1–1	2016 Women's Africa Cup of Nations
5.	26 November 2016	Stade Ahmadou Ahidjo, Yaoundé, Cameroon	Mali	3–0	3–1	2016 Women's Africa Cup of Nations
6.	3 November 2018	Nkoloma Stadium, Lusaka, Zambia	Zambia	2–0	2–3	Friendly
7.	20 November 2018	Accra Sports Stadium, Accra, Ghana	Mali	1–1	1–2	2018 Women's Africa Cup of Nations
8.	10 March 2020	Starlight Sport Complex, Antalya, Turkey	Kenya	1–0	3–1	2020 Turkish Women's Cup
9.	10 March 2020	Starlight Sport Complex, Antalya, Turkey	Kenya	2–0	3–1	2020 Turkish Women's Cup

== Honours ==
Rivers Angels

- Nigeria Women Premier League: 2014
- Aiteo Cup: 2013, 2014

Ferencváros

- Női NB I: 2015–16
- Nöi Magyar Kupa: 2015–16

Jiangsu Suning

- Chinese Women's Super League: 2019
- Chinese Women's FA Cup: 2019
- Chinese Women's FA Tournament: 2019
- Chinese Women's Super cup: 2019
- AFC Women's Club Championship runners-up: 2019

Ghana

- Africa Women Cup of Nations third-place: 2016
- Turkish Women's Cup third-place: 2020

Individual

- Africa Women Cup of Nations 2016: Best XI
- Ghana Women's Footballer of the Year: 2019
- Africa Women's Player of the Year 2016: Top 3
- Africa Women's Player of the Year 2018: Top 10
- Africa Women's Player of the Year 2019: Top 10
- IFFHS CAF Women's Team of the Decade: 2011–2020

== See also ==
- List of Ghana women's international footballers
