= Ximena Mideros =

Colombian footballer (born 1997)

Personal information
- Full name: Ximena Alexandra Mideros Gongora
- Date of birth: 15 November 1997 (age 28)
- Place of birth: Colombia
- Position: Defender

Team information
- Current team: FC Pyunik
- Number: 24

Senior career*
| Years | Team | Apps | (Gls) |
| 2018–2021 | Deportivo Pereira | | |
| 2021–2022 | Maccabi Kishronot Hadera | | |
| 2022–2024 | Eastern Flames | 22 | (4) |
| 2024– | FC Pyunik | 2 | (0) |
- * Club domestic league appearances and goals as of 7 September 2024

Ximena Alexandra Mideros Gongora (born 15 November 1997) is a Colombian footballer who plays as a defender for Armenian Women's Premier League side FC Pyunik.

== Career ==
In 2018, Mideros signed her first professional contract with Deportivo Pereira.

After spending three years with Deportivo Pereira, Gongora joined the Israeli Maccabi Kishronot Hadera in the Ligat Nashim.

On 26 December 2022 it was announced that Ximena Gongora would be transferring to Saudi Arabia's Eastern Flames. This move was made to participate in the second half of the inaugural edition of the Saudi Women's Premier League. The club decided to extend her contract on 27 August 2023.

On 4 September 2024, She signed with Armenian club FC Pyunik ahead of 2024–25 UEFA Women's Champions League. She made her debut for the club in their opening match of the Champions League qualifiers against Apollon Ladies.
