= Rita Chikwelu =

Nigerian footballer

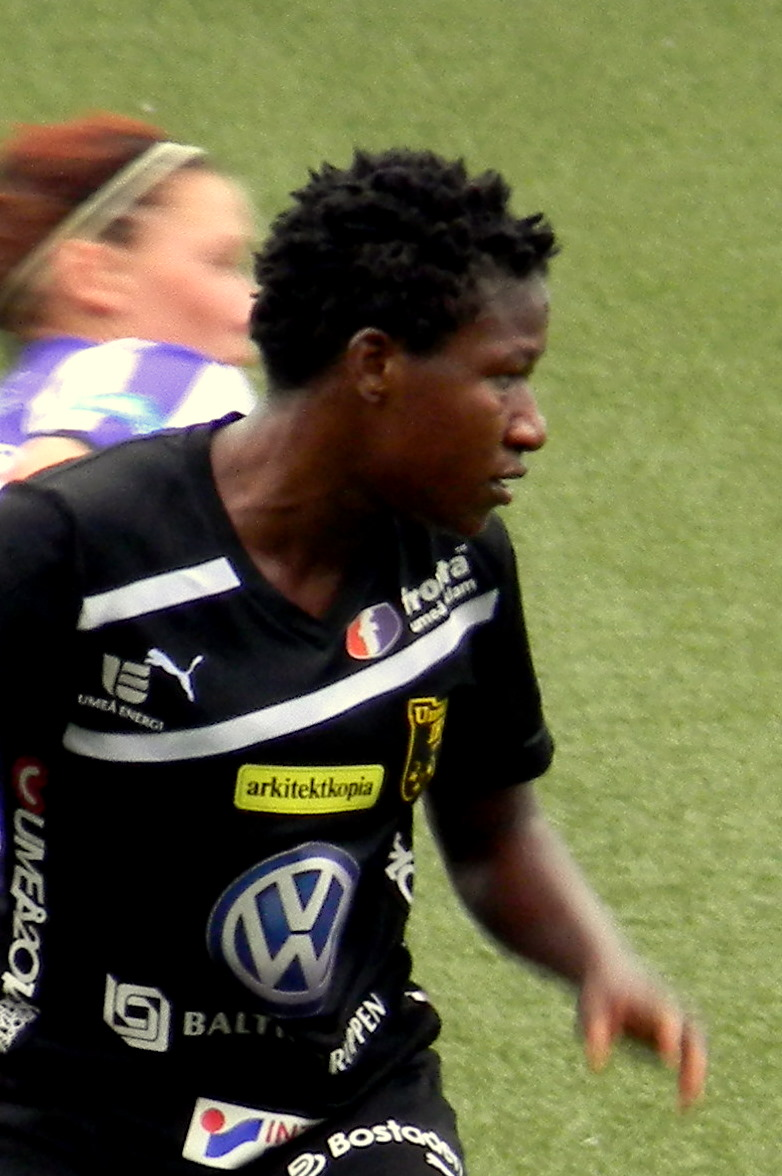
- Chikwelu with Umeå IK on 24 July 2011

Personal information
- Date of birth: 6 March 1988 (age 38)
- Place of birth: Asaba, Nigeria
- Height: 1.60 m (5 ft 3 in)
- Positions: Forward; midfielder

Team information
- Current team: Al-Riyadh
- Number: 18

Youth career
- Cold City

Senior career*
Years	Team	Apps	(Gls)
–2005	Akwa Starlets		
2006–2009	FC United		(28)
2010–2016	Umeå IK	140	(16)
2017–2019	Kristianstad	64	(12)
2020–2022	Madrid CFF	64	(5)
2022–2023	Levante Las Planas	8	(0)
2023–2024	Al Shabab	8	(2)
2024–	Al-Riyadh		

International career^{‡}
2007–	Nigeria	33	(15)
- * Club domestic league appearances and goals as of 6 November 2022 ‡ National team caps and goals as of 5 July 2011

Rita Chikwelu (born 6 March 1988) is a Nigerian professional footballer who plays as a forward and midfielder for the Saudi Women's Premier League club Al-Riyadh and the Nigeria women's national team. She previously played for the Swedish sides Umeå IK and Kristianstads DFF, and later for the Spanish clubs Madrid CFF and Levante Las Planas.

== Club career ==
From 2006 to 2009, Chikwelu played in Finland for FC United. She was the top scorer of the Finnish women's league Naisten Liiga, in 2009, with 22 goals.

Chikwelu spent seven seasons with Umeå IK from 2010 to 2016 but left following the club's relegation and joined Kristianstads DFF on a two-year contract. She later transferred to Madrid CFF and Levante Las Planas in Spain. In August 2023, she signed for Saudi club Al Shabab.

== International career ==
Chikwelu participated in the FIFA U-20 World Cup from 2004 to 2008 and made her senior national team debut in 2007 at the FIFA Women's World Cup. She was a member of the Nigerian Olympic team that participated in the 2008 Summer Olympics in China and was also part of the Nigerian squad in the 2011 FIFA Women's World Cup.

== Honours ==
- African Women's Championship Winner: 2016, 2018

In 2024, she was honoured with a traditional bestowment by her hometown, which donated a sum of money to her foundation, the Rita Chikwelu Football Academy.
