= Al-Hmmah Club =

- Full name: Al-Hmmah Sport Club
- Founded: 2019; 7 years ago
- League: Saudi Women's First Division League
- 2023–24: SWFDL, 7th of 26; League phase group 1: 1st of 6 Final round group B: 2nd of 3
Home colours	Away colours

Al-Hmmah Sport Club (Arabic: نادي الهمة الرياضي) is a professional women's football club based in Riyadh, Saudi Arabia. The club currently competes in the Saudi Women's First Division League, the second tier of women's football in Saudi Arabia.

== History ==
Founded in 2019 as Raiders Football Club, the team participated in Riyadh's first women's community football league in 2020.

On 7 November 2021, the club rebranded to Al-Hmmah Football Club and competed in the inaugural SAFF Women's National Football Championship, the kingdom's first official women's competition. During the initial phase, the team was placed in the Central Province regional league. Out of six teams, Al-Hmmah finished last, securing only one win out of ten matches.

Following the establishment of the Saudi Women's First Division League in 2022, the club was placed into the first division based on the results of the 2021–22 national championship. Al-Hmmah, along with 16 other teams were divided into five groups based on geographical location. Finishing second in Group 4, the team advanced to the quarter-finals but was eliminated by Al-Mutahed.

Al-Hmmah participated in the inaugural SAFF Women's Cup in 2023 but was eliminated in the round of 16 after a 0–5 loss in their only match.

In the 2023–24 season, Al-Hmmah had a perfect start, winning all 10 matches in the first phase without a single loss, which qualified them for the final rounds. However, with one win and one loss in the final round, the team failed to reach the semi-finals, resulting in their retention in the first division.

== Players ==
=== Current squad ===
As of 25 September 2026

Note: Flags indicate national team as defined under FIFA eligibility rules; some limited exceptions apply. Players may hold more than one non-FIFA nationality.

No.	Pos.	Nation	Player
1	GK	KSA	Ibtihal Al-Mayouf
13	DF	KSA	Mayyan Al-Aqeel
14	DF	KSA	Al-Anoud Al-Salim
15	DF	KSA	Reema Al-Nuwisr
16	DF	KSA	Fai Al-Qahtani
18	DF	CMR	Henriette Akaba
8	MF	BRA	Jaine Lemke
10	MF	ARM	Maral Artin
90	MF	ALG	Khouloud Ournani
98	MF	JOR	Lana Feras

No.	Pos.	Nation	Player
20	FW	KSA	Faya Al-Humaidan
22	GK	KSA	Nawarah Al-Dhahir
5	DF	KSA	Maha Al Fouzan
7	DF	KSA	Ashjan Al-Qhtani
2	MF	KSA	Atheer Al-Haidah
21	MF	KSA	Shahad Al-Zahrani
29	MF	KSA	Sarh Al-Farraj
9	FW	KSA	Ghala Al-Dawsari
27	FW	KSA	Fatimah Sofyani
80	FW	KSA	Al Bandari Al-Hwsawi

=== Former Foreign players ===
- (Colombia) Luiza Montaño
- (Colombia) Mayerlin Hernández
- (Indonesia) Fani Supriyanto
- (Morocco) Nassima Jawad
- (Pakistan) Zahmena Malik
- (Togo) Bendukilou Manou

== Club staff ==
goalkeepers coach	(Saudi Arabia) Majid Al-Moftah
Fitness coach	(Saudi Arabia) Ibrahim

== statistics ==
=== Season summary ===
Results of league and cup competitions by season
Season	Division	P	W	D	L	F	A	Pts	Pos	SAFF Cup
Season	League									SAFF Cup
2022–2023	SWFDL	5	3	0	2	16	5	9	6th	—N/a
2023–2024	SWFDL	12	11	0	1	92	4	33	7th	Round of 16
