= Al Shabab Club (women) =

Women's football club, Saudi Arabia

Shabab Club
- Full name: Shabab Women Football Club
- Nickname: Al-Leith (The White Lioness)
- Founded: 2017; 9 years ago as Storm WFC; 2022; 4 years ago as Al-Shabab
- Ground: Al-Shabab Club Stadium, Riyadh
- Capacity: 15,000
- Chairman: Princess Reem bint Abdullah Al-Saud
- Head coach: Miguel Morales
- League: Saudi Women's Premier League
- 2024–25: SWPL, 4th of 8
Home colours	Away colours

Shabab Football Women Club, commonly referred to as Al-Shabab Ladies (Arabic: سيدات الشباب), is a Saudi Arabian professional women's football club based in Riyadh, Saudi Arabia. The club plays in the Saudi Women's Premier League, the top tier of Saudi women's football

The club's origins trace back to 2017, when Storm WFC was established. In 2022, Al-Shabab acquired Storm WFC, and in 2023, they also acquired Al-Yamamah, merging both clubs to strengthen their women’s section. The current club is the result of this merger.

== History ==
=== 2019–2022: Founding and early Presence ===
The Storm Women's Football Club was established in Jeddah in 2019 in response to the growing interest in women's football in the kingdom. The team's initial foray onto the national stage occurred during the Women's Community Football League regional qualifiers in Jeddah, where they excelled, topping their group and advancing to the second round. Despite facing elimination after a 3-nil loss to Jeddah Eagles, the club secured a commendable podium finish.

In 2021, the team showcased their progress by participating in the SAFF Women's National Football Championship. They finished second in the Western region qualifiers, earning them a spot in the knockout stage. Unfortunately, their journey came to an end with a defeat to Al-Mamlaka, the eventual champions of the tournament.

=== 2023–present: Post-Al-Shabab acquisition and SWPL ===
In October 2022, it was officially announced that Al-Shabab has acquired the team to participate in the newly launched Saudi Women's Premier League. Right before the league kick-off, Al-Shabab revealed the appointment of former Egyptian international Marwa El-Hawat as the team's coach. The club also confirmed the signing of Ugandan goalkeeper Ruth Aturo, Lebanese striker Nancy Tchaylian, and the Egyptian duo Noha Tarek and Hayam Abdelhafez. Resulting in the club finishing in third place at the end of the season.

Months post the conclusion of the inaugural season of the SWPL, Al Shabab acquired Al Yamamah FC who had finished 4th in the 2022–23 season, and integrated it into its A team.

Prior to the 2023–24 season and to the club's first international invitational competition, the club recruited star players from regional and outside the region like Oriana Altuve, Rita Chikwelu, Chaima Abbassi, Mai Sweilem and notably Corina Luijks who became the first European to play for the team.

== Players ==
=== Current squad ===
As of 6 October 2024

Note: Flags indicate national team as defined under FIFA eligibility rules; some limited exceptions apply. Players may hold more than one non-FIFA nationality.

No.	Pos.	Nation	Player
1	GK	KSA	Laila Al-Qahtani
3	MF	KSA	Leen Mohammed (captain)
4	DF	KSA	Nadeen Al-Amri
5	DF	KSA	Muneerah Ahmed
6	MF	KSA	Lulu Al-Jawini
7	FW	KSA	Noura Ibrahim
8	FW	KSA	Al Adda Fahad
9	FW	MKD	Nataša Andonova
10	MF	FRA	Kheira Hamraoui
13	DF	KSA	Tahani Al-Zahrani
17	MF	ESP	María Díaz Cirauqui

No.	Pos.	Nation	Player
20	DF	KSA	Layan Saleh
21	GK	KSA	Mona Abdulrahman
22	FW	KSA	Abeer Nasser
25	FW	NGR	Chinonyerem Macleans
29	DF	KSA	Sara Majed
33	DF	ESP	Patricia Padilla
47	FW	KSA	Moudi Abdulmohsen
66	FW	KSA	Al Bandari Mobarak
98	DF	JOR	Lana Feras
99	MF	KSA	Abeer Omar

== Management and staff ==
=== Managerial history ===
Dates	Name
2022–2023	(Egypt) Marwa El-Hawat
2023	(Brazil) Fabio Guerreiro
2023–2024	(Saudi Arabia) Hussain Marzouq
2024–present	(Spain) Miguel Morales

== Honours ==
=== Senior ===
SAFF Women's Cup:

- Runners-up (1): 2023–24

=== Youth ===
Saudi Women's U-17 Tournament:

- Winners (1): 2023–24
