= Eastern Flames FC =

Saudi association women's football club

Eastern Flames
- Full name: Eastern Flames Football Club; Arabic: نادي شعلة الشرقية
- Nickname: Flames
- Founded: 2006; 20 years ago
- Ground: Prince Mohamed bin Fahd Stadium
- Capacity: 26,000
- Owner: Maram Al-Butairi
- Head coach: Alfonso Mesa Moral
- League: Saudi Women's Premier League
- 2024–25: SWPL, 8th of 8
- Website: https://www.easternflamesfc.com/
Home colours	Away colours

Eastern Flames Football Club (Arabic: نادي شعلة الشرقية) is a Saudi professional women's football club based in Dammam. The club established in 2006 is the kingdom's first women's football club. Eastern Flames currently competes in the country's top-tier women's domestic competition, the Saudi Women's Premier League.

Domestically, Eastern Flames won the first SAFF Women's Regional League; East Region.

== History ==
In 2006, Kaye Smith founded the Eastern Flames, the first women's football club in the country, at a time when women's sports in Saudi Arabia were very limited. Since 2021, the Eastern Flames have also participated in national tournaments, reflecting the Saudi government's support for women's sports under the Quality of Life Program, a key initiative of the Kingdom's Vision 2030.

=== The Beginning ===
Eastern Flames began with a small group of members, as Smith faced challenges in recruiting players and coaches due to religious and cultural restrictions. Despite this, the team managed to host tournaments in Dhahran behind closed doors, competing against other Saudi teams. In 2009, the Flames marked a significant milestone by participating in their first Rotary Club of Manama’s Charity Tournament in Bahrain. From the outset, the players demonstrated a strong commitment to their training, with both married and single women dedicating their lives to weekly practice sessions at the Hills Field within Aramco's Dhahran community.

In 2010, the Eastern Flames sought to elevate their performance by joining the Arsenal Soccer School Cup league in Bahrain, aiming to become competitive by facing more experienced players. Despite enduring a challenging inaugural season without a single win, their belief in progress remained steadfast.

In 2014, the Eastern Flames underwent a significant management restructuring. Maram Al-Butairi, a financial analyst at Aramco, became the manager. She appointed Karina Chapa as co-managers.

Seeking to expand their squad, the Eastern Flames' leaders actively recruited more players from within the company through word of mouth, The Arabian Sun, and community advertisements. Despite these efforts, the club faced challenges due to the public nature of women's participation in sports. To address this, the Eastern Flames raised awareness among local communities, aligning with the Kingdom's current direction of increasing women's participation in sports.

In 2020, the Eastern Flames participated in their most significant tournament to date, the first women's football tournament at the Gulf Cooperation Council in Al Ain, United Arab Emirates. Supported by the Saudi Arabian Football Federation, this event aimed to expose the Eastern Flames to professional players.

=== Saudi Women's Regional, National and Premier League ===
With the start of national tournaments and championships in Saudi Arabia, the Eastern Flames ensured their participation in all events. They triumphed in the regional community championship and the Eastern Province regional championship, winning both titles consecutively in 2020 and 2021. Emerging victorious in the regional SAFF Women's League, the Eastern Flames secured their first-ever ticket to the Women's SAFF National League as the Eastern Representative.

On 15 September 2022, the Eastern Flames made history by being announced as one of the teams to contest Saudi Arabia's first-ever women's premier league. Since then, the club has strengthened its squad by signing several North African players and Colombian striker Sara Toro.

== Players ==
=== Current squad ===
As of 13 October 2024

Note: Flags indicate national team as defined under FIFA eligibility rules; some limited exceptions apply. Players may hold more than one non-FIFA nationality.

No.	Pos.	Nation	Player
3	DF	KSA	Sadaa Ibrahim
4	DF	KSA	Wajd Al-Dhafiry
5	DF	KSA	Rahaf Tariq
8	MF	KSA	Anan Mahanna
11	FW	KSA	Mada Al-Hawiti
12	MF	KSA	Rahaf Abbas
14	FW	KSA	Seham Al-Shamsy
15	DF	KSA	Najla Jahlan
16	DF	KSA	Salma Al-Zubaidi

No.	Pos.	Nation	Player
17	MF	KSA	Munirah Al-Ali
20	FW	KSA	Dalal Al-Sayali
22	GK	BRA	Keikei
23	FW	KSA	Fedaa Al-Ashoor
35	GK	KSA	Somaih Al-Muwallad
88	MF	KSA	Fajer Saad
—	FW	KSA	Farah Jefry
—	DF	KSA	Aljazi Al-Ibrahim
—	DF	KSA	Tala Tayim
—	DF	KSA	Yasmen Al-Rakayan
—	FW	KSA	Wejdan Mohammed
—	FW	KSA	Asmaa Ahmad
—	MF	KSA	Hanadi Hakami

== Honours ==
=== Domestic ===
- SAFF Women's Regional League (Eastern region) (2, record):
  (2020–21, 2021–22)

== See also ==
- Saudi Women's Premier League
