= Saudi Women's Cup =

Primary women's association football cup competition in Saudi Arabia

SAFF Women's Cup كأس الاتحاد السعودي للسيدات
- Organiser(s): Saudi Arabian Football Federation
- Founded: 6 September 2023; 3 years ago
- Region: Saudi Arabia
- Teams: 16 (2026–27)
- Qualifier for: SAFF Super Cup
- Current champions: Al-Nassr (1st title)
- Most championships: Al-Ahli (2 titles)
- Broadcasters: List of broadcasters
- Website: SAFF Women's Cup
- 2026–27 Saudi Women's Cup

The Saudi Women's Cup, officially known as the SAFF Women's Cup, is a Single-elimination tournament in Saudi women's football, contested by clubs from the Premier League and the First Division League.

== History ==
The Director of Women's Football highlighted that hosting the Saudi Women's Cup represents a significant step in the development plans for women's football. Increasing the number of matches during the season is one of the strategic objectives aimed at enhancing the players' technical skills and fostering competitiveness among teams.

On 31 May 2024, the Saudi Football Federation renewed the exclusive partnership agreement with Saudi National Bank for a period of 3 years to sponsor the Saudi Women's Premier League and also the SAFF Women's Cup.

== Format ==
=== Participation ===
In accordance with official regulations, the SAFF has determined the allocation of the 16 available spots. Direct qualification is granted to all clubs from the Saudi Women's Premier League.

=== Seeding ===
In the draw, the eight Premier League clubs are seeded into level A, while the First Division League clubs are seeded into level B. Each club from level A is matched against from level B.

=== Match rules ===
All games are held over two 45-minute halves with the winner advancing to the next round. In case of a draw, the game gets extended by two 15-minute halves. If the score is still level after 120 minutes, the winner is decided by penalty shootout.

== Champions ==
Year	Champions	Result	Runners-up	Venue
2023–24	Al-Ahli	3–2	Al-Shabab	Kingdom Arena, Riyadh
2024–25	Al-Ahli	2–1	Al-Qadsiah	Kingdom Arena, Riyadh
2025–26	Al-Nassr	3–2 (a.e.t.)	Al-Hilal	Kingdom Arena, Riyadh
2026–27

== All-time top scorers ==
As of 19 March 2025

	Player	Club(s)	Goals
1	(Morocco) Ibtissam Jraïdi	Al-Ahli	23
2	(Democratic Republic of the Congo) Naomie Kabakaba	Al-Ahli	9
3	(Venezuela) Oriana Altuve	Al-Shabab	8
3	(Tanzania) Enekia Kasonga	Eastern Flames	8
5	(Tanzania) Clara Luvanga	Al-Nassr	7

== Sponsorship ==
Sponsor(s)	Period	Ref
Saudi National Bank	2024–present	

== Broadcasters ==
Region	Broadcaster	Period	Ref.
Saudi Arabia & Middle East and North Africa	SSC	2023–2024	
Saudi Arabia & Middle East and North Africa	MBC Action	2025–present	
Saudi Arabia & Middle East and North Africa	MBC Shahid (streaming)	2023–present	

== See also ==
- Madaris League
- Saudi Women's Super Cup
- Women's association football
- Saudi Women's Premier League
- Women's football in Saudi Arabia
- Saudi Women's First Division League
- Saudi Women's Premier Challenge Cup
- Saudi Girls' youth football competitions
- Saudi Women's Second Division League
