= 2024–25 Saudi Women's Cup =

2024–25 SAFF Women's Cup
Tournament details
- Country: Saudi Arabia
- Dates: 17 October 2024–19 March 2025
- Teams: 16

Final positions
- Champions: Al-Ahli (2nd title)
- Runners-up: Al-Qadsiah
- Third place: Al-Nassr
- Fourth place: Al-Shabab

Tournament statistics
- Matches played: 16
- Goals scored: 91 (5.69 per match)
- Top goal scorer(s): (Morocco) Ibtissam Jraïdi (AHL) (9 goals)

Awards
- Best player: (Democratic Republic of the Congo) Naomie Kabakaba (AHL)
- Best goalkeeper: (United States) Lindsey Harris (QDS)
- Goals scored in penalty shoot-outs not included.

The 2024–25 Saudi Women's Cup, officially the 2024–25 SAFF Women's Cup was the second season of the annual Saudi women's football cup competition. Sixteen teams participated in the competition. Al-Ahli were the defending champions, having beaten Al-Shabab 3–2 in the 2024 final on 28 March 2024. and they successfully retained their title by overcoming Al-Qadsiah 2–1 in the final.

== Overview ==
Following the announcement of the Saudi Women's Super Cup, this season's champions and runners-up will qualify for its inaugural edition.

== Participating clubs ==
The following clubs qualified for the competition:

Saudi Women's Premier League the 8 clubs of the 2023–24	Saudi Women's First Division League the best 8 clubs of the 2023–24
1. Al-Nassr; 2. Al-Ahli; 3. Al-Shabab; 4. Al Qadsiah; 5. Al-Hilal; 6. Al-Ittihad; 7. Eastern Flames; 8. Al-Riyadh ▼	1. Al-Ula ▲; 2. Al-Taraji ▲; 3. Al-Amal ▲; 4. ~~Al-Taqadom~~; 5. Abha; 6. Phoenix; 7. Al-Hmmah; 8. Jeddah Club; 9. Al-Shoulla

Notes

1. ^{†} Despite originally qualifying for the cup, Al-Taqadom did not confirm its participation in the cup within the specified timeframe set by the Competitions Committee. Therefore they were replaced by Al-Shoulla.

=== Seeding ===
Clubs were seeded first based on their current league tier (Premier and First Division), and subsequently based on their positions in their respective leagues from the 2023–24 season.

Seeded	Unseeded
Al-Nassr; Al-Ahli (TH); Al-Shabab; Al-Qadsiah; Al-Hilal; Al-Ittihad; Eastern Flames; Al-Ula	Al-Taraji; Al-Amal; Al-Riyadh; Abha; Phoenix; Al-Hmmah; Jeddah Club; Al-Shoulla

== Knockout stage ==
=== Bracket ===
The tournament bracket is shown below, with bold denoting the winners of each match.

Round of 16
19 October – Riyadh
**Al-Shabab (w/o)**	**3**
Phoenix	0
18 October – Riyadh
**Al-Hilal**	**7**
Abha	0
19 October – Jeddah
**Al-Ahli**	**12**
Al-Hmmah	0
18 October – Medina
**Al-Ula**	**2**
Al-Riyadh	1
18 October – Khobar
**Al-Qadsiah**	**4**
Al-Amal	1
19 October – Al Kharj
Al-Shoulla	2
**Eastern Flames**	**5**
18 October – Jeddah
**Al-Ittihad**	**13**
Jeddah	1
19 October – Qatif
Al-Taraji	0
**Al-Nassr**	**8**

Quarter-finals
4 January – Riyadh
**Al-Shabab (a.e.t.)**	**2**
Al-Hilal	1
4 January – Medina
**Al-Ahli**	**3**
Al-Ula	1
5 January – Khobar
**Al-Qadsiah**	**8**
Eastern Flames	1
5 January – Jeddah
Al-Ittihad	2
**Al-Nassr**	**3**

Semi-finals
15 February – Riyadh
Al-Shabab	2
**Al-Ahli**	**3**
14 February – Riyadh
**Al-Qadsiah (p)**	**1 (4)**
Al-Nassr	1 (2)

Final
19 March – Riyadh
**Al-Ahli**	**2**
Al-Qadsiah	1
Third place play-off
18 March – Riyadh
Al-Shabab	0
**Al-Nassr (a.e.t.)**	**1**

=== Round of 16 ===
18 October 2024	**Al-Qadsiah**	**4–1**	**Al-Amal**	khobar
17:45	Asiri 8'; Rayanne 15'; Le Garrec 62'; Nchout 83'	Report	Abdullatif 50' (o.g.)	Stadium: Al Qadsiah Club Stadium; Referee: Fahad Al-Zahrani

18 October 2024	**Al-Hilal**	**7–0**	**Abha**	Riyadh
18:00	Martínez 6', 10'; Traoré 13' (o.g.); A. Al-Hwsawi 25'; Nooraldin 45+1', 51'; Al-Johani 67'	Report		Stadium: Inaya Medical Colleges Stadium; Referee: Ali Al-Qahtani

18 October 2024	**Al-Ula**	**2–1**	**Al-Riyadh**	Medina
20:00	Kapetanović 25', 63'	Report	Jerry 90'	Stadium: Al-Ula Club Stadium; Referee: Khalid Al-Rashidi

18 October 2024	**Al-Ittihad**	**13–1**	**Jeddah**	Jeddah
20:00	Tawfiq 2', 63'; Iskandar 3', 45+1'; Letícia 7', 22', 29'; Abdulrazak 13', 45', 54'; Plumptre 15'; Al-Sharif 59'; Mansour 67'	Report	Bensenouci 65'	Stadium: Al-Ittihad Club Stadium; Referee: Suleiman Al-Shehri

19 October 2024	**Al-Shabab**	**3–0 (w/o)**	**Phoenix**	Riyadh
18:00		Report		Stadium: Al-Shabab Club Stadium; Referee: Reem Al-Dossary

19 October 2024	**Al-Shoulla**	**2–5**	**Eastern Flames**	Al Kharj
18:00	Raheem 34'; Elmitwalli 58' (pen.)	Report	Mustafa 18', 31', 82'; Cesane 78'; Jolina 90+6'	Stadium: Al-Shoulla Club Stadium; Referee: Waleed Al-Merdasi

19 October 2024	**Al-Ahli**	**12–0**	**Al-Hmmah**	Jeddah
20:00	Kabakaba 9', 19', 40', 51'; Jraïdi 14', 20', 43', 66', 72', 83'; Al-Majali 90'; Nakkach 90+3'	Report		Stadium: Al-Ahli Club Stadium; Referee: Hussain Abu Shaheen

19 October 2024	**Al-Taraji**	**0–8**	**Al-Nassr**	Qatif
20:00		Report	Boussaha 5', 65', 69'; Luvanga 30', 61', 67'; Duda 76'; Bahlouli 85'	Stadium: Al-Taraji Club Stadium; Referee: Ibrahim Al-Hiqwi

=== Quarter-finals ===
4 January 2025	**Al-Shabab**	**2–1** (a.e.t.)	**Al-Hilal**	Riyadh
17:55	Mobarak 34'; Feras 108'	Report	A. Al-Hwsawi 8'	Stadium: Prince Faisal bin Fahd Sports City; Referee: Ali Al-Qahtani

4 January 2025	**Al-Ula**	**1–3**	**Al-Ahli**	Medina
20:30	Jaine 85'	Report	Kabakaba 14', 52'; Jraïdi 72'	Stadium: Prince Mohammed bin Abdul Aziz Stadium; Referee: Reem Al-Dossary

5 January 2025	**Eastern Flames**	**1–8**	**Al-Qadsiah**	Khobar
17:40	Mustafa 10'	Report	Asiri 1'; Nchout 7', 12', 29'; Gunnarsdóttir 32'; Al-Faris 70'; Keikei 79' (o.g.); Le Garrec 80'	Stadium: Prince Saud bin Jalawi Stadium; Referee: Fahad Zahrania

5 January 2025	**Al-Ittihad**	**2–3**	**Al-Nassr**	Jeddah
20:30	Kathellen 26' (o.g.); Mansour 70'	Report	Al-Saiari 54'; Luvanga 80'; Bahlouli 90+3'	Stadium: Al-Ittihad Club Stadium; Referee: Sultan Al-Otaibi

=== Semi-finals ===
14 February 2024	**Al-Qadsiah**	**1–1** (a.e.t.) (**4–2** p)	**Al-Nassr**	Riyadh
18:20	Gunnarsdóttir 105' (pen.)	Report	Al-Harbi 100'	Stadium: Al-Nassr Club Stadium; Referee: Mosad Al Meshari
	**Penalties**
	Rayanne (penalty scored); Adriana (penalty scored); Gunnarsdóttir (penalty scored); Harris (penalty scored)		(penalty scored) Duda; (penalty missed) Kathellen; (penalty missed) Bahlouli; (penalty scored) Luvanga

15 February 2024	**Al-Shabab**	**2–3**	**Al-Ahli**	Riyadh
18:20	Nasser 30'; Mobarak 90'	Report	Kabakaba 12'; Jraïdi 48'; Al-Hawsawi 90+5'	Stadium: Al-Shabab Club Stadium; Referee: Ibrahim Al-Jurays

=== Third place play-off ===
18 March 2025	**Al-Nassr**	**1–0** (a.e.t.)	**Al-Shabab**	Riyadh
22:00	Sara Khalid (red card) 113'; Kipoyi 120'	Report		Stadium: Prince Faisal bin Fahd Stadium

=== Final ===
19 March 2025
22:00

Al-Qadsiah	1–2	Al-Ahli
Al-Mansouri 18'	Report	Kabakaba 45'; Jraïdi 50'

Kingdom Arena, Riyadh
Referee: Maria Sole Ferrieri Caputi (Italy)

**Al-Qadsiah**	**Al-Ahli**

GK	23	(United States) Lindsey Harris		(substituted off) 82'
DF	24	(Saudi Arabia) Raghad Mania	(yellow card) 35'	(substituted off) 46'
DF	2	(Saudi Arabia) Dalal Abdullatif	(yellow card) 53'
DF	12	(Saudi Arabia) Munirah Al-Ghanam	(yellow card) 37'	(substituted off) 46'
MF	15	(Saudi Arabia) Sulaf Asseri		(substituted off) 75'
MF	7	(Iceland) Sara Björk Gunnarsdóttir	(yellow card) 90+6'
MF	27	(France) Léa Le Garrec
DF	71	(Saudi Arabia) Bayan Mohammed
MF	8	(Saudi Arabia) Rahaf Al-Mansouri		(substituted off) 83'
FW	16	(Brazil) Adriana
FW	77	(Saudi Arabia) Noura Ibrahim	(yellow card) 90+1'
Substitutes:
DF	34	(Saudi Arabia) Mashael Al-Harbi
FW	11	(Saudi Arabia) Yara Al-Faris
GK	1	(Saudi Arabia) Salma Al-Dosari		(substituted on) 82'
DF	99	(Saudi Arabia) Rana Hassan
FW	3	(Cameroon) Ajara Nchout		(substituted on) 83'
FW	17	(Saudi Arabia) Haya Al-Sunaidi		(substituted on) 75'
DF	94	(Brazil) Rayanne Machado
FW	19	(Saudi Arabia) Joury Tarek		(substituted on) 46'
MF	14	(Saudi Arabia) Maram Al-Yahya		(substituted on) 46'
Manager:
(Portugal) Luís Andrade

GK	1	(Jordan) Rawand Kassab
DF	19	(Jordan) Ayah Al-Majali
DF	22	(Saudi Arabia) Sawaher Al-Asiri
DF	16	(Saudi Arabia) Huriyyah Al-Shamrani	(yellow card) 30'
MF	23	(Saudi Arabia) Raghad Mukhayzin
MF	14	(Egypt) Farida Hanafi
FW	9	(Morocco) Ibtissam Jraïdi		(substituted off) 86'
FW	7	(Democratic Republic of the Congo) Naomie Kabakaba
FW	11	(Saudi Arabia) Daliah Abu Laban
FW	24	(Saudi Arabia) Moluk Al-Hawsawi	(yellow card) 87'
FW	17	(Saudi Arabia) Fadwa Khaled
Substitutes:
DF	4	(Saudi Arabia) Rahaf Al-Barakati
FW	70	(Saudi Arabia) Danah Fahad
FW	8	(Saudi Arabia) Al-Hanouf Mazouzah
MF	77	(Saudi Arabia) Roaa Al-Sulaimani
GK	34	(Saudi Arabia) Ghaliah Emam
DF	12	(Saudi Arabia) Shahad Al-Ghamdi
MF	6	(Morocco) Élodie Nakkach		(substituted on) 86'
DF	21	(Saudi Arabia) Raghad Ghandourah
DF	3	(Saudi Arabia) Ghada Malhan
Manager:
(Jordan) Manar Fraij

Assistant referees:
Francesca Di Monte (Italy)
Veronica Martinelli (Italy)
Fourth official:
Reem Al-Dosari

== Top scorers ==
Rank	Player	Club	Goals
1	(Morocco) Ibtissam Jraïdi	Al-Ahli	9
2	(Democratic Republic of the Congo) Naomie Kabakaba	Al-Ahli	8
3	(Cameroon) Ajara Nchout	Al-Qadsiah	4
3	(Tanzania) Clara Luvanga	Al-Nassr	4
3	(Syria) Nor Mustafa	Eastern Flames	4
6	(Brazil) Letícia Nunes	Al-Ittihad	3
6	(Saudi Arabia) Lana Abdulrazak	Al-Ittihad	3
6	(Algeria) Lina Boussaha	Al-Nassr	3
9	(Paraguay) Jessica Martínez	Al-Hilal	2
9	(Iraq) Shokhan Nooraldin	Al-Hilal	2
9	(Saudi Arabia) Al-Bandari Al-Hwsawi	Al-Hilal	2
9	(France) Nesrine Bahlouli	Al-Nassr	2
9	(France) Léa Le Garrec	Al-Qadsiah	2
9	(Saudi Arabia) Sulaf Asseri	Al-Qadsiah	2
9	(Bosnia and Herzegovina) Selma Kapetanović	Al-Ula	2
9	(Saudi Arabia) Seba Tawfiq	Al-Ittihad	2
9	(Lebanon) Lili Iskandar	Al-Ittihad	2
9	(Saudi Arabia) Fatimah Mansour	Al-Ittihad	2
9	(Iceland) Sara Björk Gunnarsdóttir	Al-Qadsiah	2
9	(Saudi Arabia) Al-Bandary Mobarak	Al-Shabab	2
21	(Brazil) Rayanne Machado	Al-Qadsiah	1
21	(Saudi Arabia) Yara Al-Faris	Al-Qadsiah	1
21	(Saudi Arabia) Joury Al-Johani	Al-Hilal	1
21	(Nigeria) Joy Jerry	Al-Riyadh	1
21	(Nigeria) Ashleigh Plumptre	Al-Ittihad	1
21	(Saudi Arabia) Raneem Al-Sharif	Al-Ittihad	1
21	(Algeria) Abla Bensenouci	Jeddah	1
21	(Brazil) Duda Francelino	Al-Nassr	1
21	(Saudi Arabia) Mubarkh Al-Saiari	Al-Nassr	1
21	(Jordan) Ayah Al-Majali	Al-Ahli	1
21	(Morocco) Élodie Nakkach	Al-Ahli	1
21	(Iraq) Hiba Raheem	Al-Shoulla	1
21	(Egypt) Salwa Elmitwalli	Al-Shoulla	1
21	(South Africa) Noxolo Cesane	Eastern Flames	1
21	(Cape Verde) Jolina Amani	Eastern Flames	1
21	(Jordan) Lana Feras	Al-Shabab	1
21	(Brazil) Jaine Lemke	Al-Ula	1
21	(Saudi Arabia) Faey Al-Harbi	Al-Nassr	1
21	(Saudi Arabia) Moluk Al-Hawsawi	Al-Ahli	1
21	(Saudi Arabia) Abeer Nasser	Al-Shabab	1
21	(Democratic Republic of the Congo) Ruth Kipoyi	Al-Nassr	1
21	(Saudi Arabia) Rahaf Al-Mansouri	Al-Qadsiah	1

== Prize money ==
The Saudi Football Federation has raised the prize for the winner from 750,000 to 1 million Saudi Riyals, while maintaining the second-place prize at 500,000 Saudi Riyals and the third-place prize at 200,000 Saudi Riyals.

Place	Teams	Amount (in riyal)
Champions	1	1,000,000 SAR
Runners-up	1	500,000 SAR
Third place	1	200,000 SAR
Total	3	1,700,000 SAR
