= 2025–26 Saudi Women's First Division League =

Saudi Women's First Division League
- Season: 2025–26
- Dates: 26 September 2025 – 24 April 2026
- Champions: Al-Taraji (1st title)
- Promoted: Al-Taraji; Al-Nahda; Al-Amal
- Relegated: Phoenix
- Matches: 56
- Goals: 333 (5.95 per match)
- Best player: (Democratic Republic of the Congo) Grâce Mfwamba
- Top goalscorer: (Guinea) Fanta Camara (36 goals)
- Biggest home win: Al-Amal 15–0 Phoenix (13 December 2025)
- Biggest away win: Phoenix 2–12 Al-Nahda (24 April 2026)
- Highest scoring: Al-Amal 15–0 Phoenix (13 December 2025)
- Longest winning run: 5 matches Al-Taraji
- Longest unbeaten run: 9 matches Najmat Jeddah
- Longest winless run: 14 matches Phoenix
- Longest losing run: 7 matches Phoenix

The 2025–26 Saudi Women's First Division League was the fourth season of the SAFF Women's First Division League, Saudi Arabia's second tier of women's football competitions. It will begin on 26 September 2025 and is scheduled to end on 24 April 2026.

== Teams ==
=== Promotion and relegation (pre-season) ===
Initially, a total of ten teams were set to contest the league, including six sides maintained from the 2024–25 season, two relegated from the Premier League, and two promoted from the Second Division. However, after a series of men's professional clubs disbanded their women's teams – including three of the maintained sides (Al-Riyadh, Al-Shoulla and Jeddah) – the third-placed team from the Second Division was promoted, and the league was eventually played with eight teams

Teams relegated from the Premier League

The first team to be relegated from the Premier League were Al-Taraji, after a 0–5 loss to Al-Amal on 8 March 2025. and they were later joined by Al-Amal, whose own relegation was confirmed on the final matchweek following a 4–0 loss to Al-Shabab.

Teams promoted to the Premier League

NEOM became the first team to secure promotion from the league, following a 4–2 away victory against Al-Riyadh on 8 March 2025, in their inaugural season competing as NEOM. The other promoted team, Abha, secured their ticket to the Premier League on the final matchday, 26 April 2025, after a 5–1 away victory over Al-Hmmah.

Team relegated to the Second Division

With one relegation spot available, Al-Bayraq was the only team to be relegated from the league, with their relegation confirmed on 15 March after a 15–0 defeat to NEOM.

Teams promoted from the Second Division

The two finalists of the Second Division – Najmat Jeddah and Al-Nahda – secured promotion to the First Division after their semi-final victories on 16 February 2025. On 15 August, it was confirmed that the third-placed team, Al-Yarmouk, would also be promoted, after an additional promotion spot was allocated.

=== Stadiums and locations ===
Locations of the 2025–26 Saudi Women's First Division League teams

Team	Location	Ground	2024-25 Season
Al-Amal	Riyadh	Al-Motawa Academy Stadium	PL, 9th
Al-Hmmah	Riyadh	Al-Yamamah University Stadium	4th
Al-Nahda	Dammam	Al-Nahda Club Stadium	D2, 2nd
Al-Taraji	Qatif	Al-Taraji Club Stadium	PL, 10th
Al-Yarmouk	Jazan	King Faisal Sport City	D2, 3rd
Najmat Jeddah	Jeddah	King Abdulaziz University Stadium	D2, 1st
Phoenix	Taif	King Fahd Sports City Annex Stadium 1	7th
United Eagles	Qatif; Safwa City	Al-Taraji Club Stadium; Prince Nayef bin Abdulaziz Stadium; Al-Safa Club Stadium	5th

=== Foreign players ===
Club	Foreign players					Former players
Club	Player 1	Player 2	Player 3	Player 4	Player 5	Former players
Al-Amal	(Egypt) Omnia Mahmoud	(Guinea) Fanta Camara	(India) Kajol D'Souza	(Uganda) Natasha Shirazi		
Al-Hmmah	(Algeria) Abla Bensenouci	(Brazil) Jaine Lemke	(Ghana) Jennifer Yeboah	(Senegal) Meta Camara	(Senegal) Meta Kandé	(Algeria) Imène Merrouche (injured)
Al-Nahda	(Bahrain) Hessa Al-Isa	(Cameroon) Henriette Akaba	(Cameroon) Moussa Zouwairatou	(Ghana) Elizabeth Addo	(Ivory Coast) Rita Akaffou	
Al-Taraji	(Brazil) Marina Höher	(Brazil) Izabela Stahelin	(Democratic Republic of the Congo) Grâce Mfwamba	(Tunisia) Wafe Messaoud	(Zambia) Siomala Mapepa	(Bahrain) Manar Yaqoob
Al-Yarmouk	(Burkina Faso) Mouniratou Compaoré	(Burkina Faso) Balkissa Sawadogo	(Ghana) Vera Afful	(Ivory Coast) Mariam Sidibé	(Senegal) Ndeye Awa Diakhaté	
Najmat Jeddah	(Ivory Coast) Stéphanie Gbogou	(Ghana) Cecilia Hagan	(Nigeria) Yetunde Balogun	(Ethiopia) Netsanet Muluneh	(United States) Lianna Gates	
Phoenix	(Algeria) Ghania Ayadi	(Algeria) Fouzia Bakli	(Ghana) Rashida Ibrahim	(Tunisia) Chaima Ben Mohamed	(Tunisia) Eya Mejri	(Algeria) Sara Amriou (Egypt) Noura Noureldin (Tunisia) Emna El Ouerghemi
United Eagles	(Algeria) Fedwa Hassouni (Note: Played the first half of the league with Al-Yarmouk)	(Ivory Coast) Nadège Cissé	(Ivory Coast) Fatou Coulibaly	(Kenya) Violet Nanjala	(Mali) Bintou Koité|	(Palestine) Etaf Al-Sawi

== League table ==
Pos	Team	Pld	W	D	L	GF	GA	GD	Pts	Promotion or relegation
1	Al-Taraji (C, P)	14	9	2	3	45	31	+14	29	Promotion to the 2026–27 Saudi Premier League
2	Al-Nahda (P)	14	8	4	2	50	15	+35	28	Promotion to the 2026–27 Saudi Premier League
3	Al-Amal (P)	14	8	2	4	67	35	+32	26	Promotion to the 2026–27 Saudi Premier League
4	Al-Hmmah	14	7	4	3	47	29	+18	25	
5	Al-Yarmouk	14	6	4	4	45	32	+13	22	
6	Najmat Jeddah	14	4	6	4	42	33	+9	18	
7	United Eagles	14	1	3	10	17	61	−44	6	
8	Phoenix (R)	14	0	1	13	20	97	−77	1	Relegation to the 2026–27 Saudi Second Division League

Source: SAFF
Rules for classification: 1) Points; 2) Goal difference; 3) Number of goals scored.
(C) Champions; (P) Promoted; (R) Relegated

== Results ==
The season's match schedule was announced on 17 August 2025.

Home \ Away	AML	TRJ	HMM	UEG	PHX	NJM	NHD	YAR
Al-Amal		6–0	5–2	6–1	15–0	4–4	0–2	8–5
Al-Taraji	3–1		3–2	7–3	4–1	2–1	2–4	2–2
Al-Hmmah	5–1	1–1		3–0	5–0	3–3	2–2	3–2
United Eagles	1–9	0–8	3–4		4–3	1–1	0–7	0–0
Phoenix	2–4	1–3	1–10	1–1		2–4	2–12	3–10
Najmat Jeddah	3–4	4–2	2–5	7–3	8–1		1–1	1–2
Al-Nahda	4–1	2–4	0–0	2–0	12–0	1–1		0–2
Al-Yarmouk	3–3	3–4	6–2	3–0	5–3	2–2	0–1	

Source: SAFF
Legend: Blue = home team win; Yellow = draw; Red = away team win.

== Season statistics ==
As of 27 March 2026

=== Scoring ===
- First goal of the season:
  - (Cameroon) Moussa Zouwairatou (Al-Nahda) against Al-Amal (26 September 2025)

=== Top scorers ===
Rank	Player	Club	Goals
1	(Guinea) Fanta Camara	Al-Amal	31
2	(Democratic Republic of the Congo) Grâce Mfwamba	Al-Taraji	18
3	(Ivory Coast) Stéphanie Gbogou	Najmat Jeddah	15
4	(Nigeria) Yetunde Balogun	Najmat Jeddah	13
5	(Ivory Coast) Mariam Sidibé	Al-Yarmouk	12
6	(Algeria) Abla Bensenouci	Al-Hmmah	9
6	(Burkina Faso) Balkissa Sawadogo	Al-Yarmouk	9
8	(Bahrain) Hessa Al-Isa	Al-Nahda	9
8	(Cameroon) Moussa Zouwairatou	Al-Nahda	9
8	(Ghana) Jennifer Yeboah	Al-Hmmah	9
8	(Kenya) Violet Wanyonyi	United Eagles	9

=== Clean sheets ===
Rank	Player	Club	Clean sheets
1	(Saudi Arabia) Maria Al-Najjar	Al-Nahda	7
2	(Saudi Arabia) Afaf Al-Mutairi	Al-Hmmah	2
2	(Saudi Arabia) Norah Al-Tayel	Al-Yarmouk	2
4	(Saudi Arabia) Somaih Al-Muwallad	United Eagles	1
4	(Saudi Arabia) Zahrah Bahmaid	Al-Yarmouk	1
4	(Saudi Arabia) Fatimah Al-Shehri	Al-Amal	1
4	(Saudi Arabia) Ibtihal Al-Mayouf	Al-Amal	1
4	(Saudi Arabia) Samar Abdulazizi	Al-Taraji	1
