= 2023–24 Saudi Women's First Division League =

Saudi Women's First Division League
- Season: 2023–24
- Dates: 9 November 2023 – 13 March 2024
- Champions: Al-Ula (1st title)
- Relegated: 14 Teams
- Matches: 120
- Goals: 983 (8.19 per match)
- Best Player: (Bosnia and Herzegovina) Selma Kapetanović
- Top goalscorer: (Tunisia) Wafe Messaoud (36 goals)
- Best goalkeeper: (Canada) Chandra Morden

The 2023–24 Saudi Women's First Division League was the second season of Saudi Women's First Division League, Saudi Arabia's second-tier women's football league. It runs from 9 November 2023 to April 2024.

== Teams ==
Locations of the 2023–24 Women's Premier League teams

A total of 26 teams competed in the second edition of the first division. Sama (now known as Al-Bayraq) joined the league following their relegation from the premier league. Eleven teams returned from the previous edition, while the other fourteen teams entered the competition for the first time.

- Abha
- Al-Amal
- Al-Bayraq
- Al-Fateh
- Al-Hejaz
- Al-Hmmah
- Al-Nahda
- Al-Nors
- Al-Orobah
- Al-Shoulla
- Al-Suqoor
- Al-Taqadom
- Al-Taraji
- Al-Ula
- Al-Watani
- Al-Wehda
- Al-Ain
- Golden Eagles
- Jeddah
- Manjam Al-Mawahib
- Najmt Jeddah
- Ohd
- Phoenix
- Ras Tanura
- Saham
- United Eagles

=== Team changes ===
Entering league	Exiting league
Relegated from 2022–23 Premier League	Promoted to 2023–24 Premier League
Al-Bayraq	Al-Riyadh; Al-Qadsiah

== Group stage ==
=== Group 1 ===
Pos	Team	Pld	W	D	L	GF	GA	GD	Pts	Qualification or relegation	HMM	SHO	BRQ	GEA	ORB	WAT
1	Al-Hmmah	10	10	0	0	89	2	+87	30	advance to the final stages	—	3–1	4–0	5–0	5–0	24–0
2	Al-Shoulla	10	6	0	4	77	17	+60	18	advance to the final stages	1–7	—	1–3	8–0	17–0	18–0
3	Al-Bayraq	10	5	2	3	68	15	+53	17	advance to the final stages	0–3	0–3	—	3–3	7–0	26–0
4	Golden Eagles	10	5	2	3	63	27	+36	17	Relegation to the 2024–25 Saudi Women's Second Division League	0–7	4–2	1–1	—	6–0	22–0
5	Al-Orobah	10	2	0	8	9	74	−65	6	Relegation to the 2024–25 Saudi Women's Second Division League	0–12	0–6	0–6	1–15	—	3–0
6	Al-Watani (Note: Al-Watani were deducted 3 points after failing to appear in the match against Al-Orobah the 23 of November 2023.)	10	0	0	10	0	171	−171	−3	Relegation to the 2024–25 Saudi Women's Second Division League	0–19	0–20	0–22	0–12	0–5	—

Source: SAFF
Rules for classification: 1) Points; 2) Goal difference; 3) Number of goals scored.

=== Group 2 ===
Pos	Team	Pld	W	D	L	GF	GA	GD	Pts	Qualification or relegation	TRJ	UEA	NAH	RTN	FAT
1	Al-Taraji	8	8	0	0	99	2	+97	24	advance to the final stages	—	4–1	2–1	13–0	23–0
2	United Eagles	8	6	0	2	50	7	+43	18	advance to the final stages	0–2	—	3–0	8–0	21–0
3	Al-Nahda	8	4	0	4	17	14	+3	12	Relegation to the 2024–25 Saudi Women's Second Division League	0–5	0–4	—	1–0	2–0
4	Ras Tanura	8	2	0	6	3	60	−57	6	Relegation to the 2024–25 Saudi Women's Second Division League	0–23	0–10	0–5	—	2–0
5	Al-Fateh	8	0	0	8	1	87	−86	0	Relegation to the 2024–25 Saudi Women's Second Division League	0–27	1–3	0–8	0–1	—

Source: SAFF
Rules for classification: 1) Points; 2) Goal difference; 3) Number of goals scored.

=== Group 3 ===
Pos	Team	Pld	W	D	L	GF	GA	GD	Pts	Qualification or relegation	ULA	TQD	WHD	MNJ	OHD
1	Al-Ula	8	7	1	0	63	1	+62	22	advance to the final stages	—	1–0	7–0	17–0	4–0
2	Al-Taqadom	8	5	2	1	35	5	+30	17	advance to the final stages	1–1	—	1–0	7–2	5–0
3	Al-Wehda	8	4	1	3	34	14	+20	13	Relegation to the 2024–25 Saudi Women's Second Division League	0–4	1–1	—	11–0	6–0
4	Manjam Al Mawahib	8	1	1	6	12	77	−65	4	Relegation to the 2024–25 Saudi Women's Second Division League	0–15	0–14	1–8	—	5–5
5	Ohod	8	0	1	7	5	52	−47	1	Relegation to the 2024–25 Saudi Women's Second Division League	0–14	0–6	0–8	0–4	—

Source: SAFF
Rules for classification: 1) Points; 2) Goal difference; 3) Number of goals scored.

=== Group 4 ===
Pos	Team	Pld	W	D	L	GF	GA	GD	Pts	Qualification or relegation	AML	ABH	PHX	HJZ	AIN
1	Al-Amal	8	7	0	1	73	16	+57	21	advance to the final stages	—	2–7	5–3	24–0	6–2
2	Abha	8	6	0	2	59	16	+43	18	advance to the final stages	3–7	—	3–4	2–0	6–1
3	Phoenix	8	4	1	3	56	23	+33	13	advance to the final stages	1–8	2–4	—	8–1	2–2
4	Al-Hejaz	8	1	0	7	4	114	−110	3	Relegation to the 2024–25 Saudi Women's Second Division League	0–10	0–26	0–27	—	3–0
5	Al-Ain	8	1	1	6	22	45	−23	1	Relegation to the 2024–25 Saudi Women's Second Division League	0–11	0–8	0–9	17–0	—

Source: SAFF
Rules for classification: 1) Points; 2) Goal difference; 3) Number of goals scored.

=== Group 5 ===
Pos	Team	Pld	W	D	L	GF	GA	GD	Pts	Qualification or relegation	JED	SUQ	NJJ	NRS	SAH
1	Jeddah	8	7	0	1	28	7	+21	21	advance to the final stages	—	3–4	1–0	3–0	9–0
2	Al-Suqoor	8	5	1	2	28	11	+17	16	advance to the final stages	0–1	—	2–3	2–1	8–1
3	Najmt Jeddah	8	3	2	3	35	12	+23	11	Relegation to the 2024–25 Saudi Women's Second Division League	1–5	2–2	—	0–0	23–0
4	Al-Nors	8	3	1	4	16	12	+4	10	Relegation to the 2024–25 Saudi Women's Second Division League	2–3	0–4	1–0	—	8–0
5	Saham	8	0	0	8	2	67	−65	−3	Relegation to the 2024–25 Saudi Women's Second Division League	0–3	0–6	1–6	0–4	—

Source: SAFF
Rules for classification: 1) Points; 2) Goal difference; 3) Number of goals scored.

=== Ranking of third-placed teams ===
The best third-placed teams from the groups with five teams will qualify for the final tournament, joining the top three teams from Group 1 and the top two from Groups 2 to 5.

Pos	Grp	Team	Pld	W	D	L	GF	GA	GD	Pts	Qualification or relegation
1	4	Phoenix	8	4	1	3	56	23	+33	13	advance to the final stages
2	3	Al-Wehda	8	4	1	3	34	14	+20	13	Relegation to the 2024–25 Saudi Women's Second Division League
3	2	Al-Nahda	8	4	0	4	17	14	+3	12	Relegation to the 2024–25 Saudi Women's Second Division League
4	5	Najmt Jeddah	8	3	2	3	35	12	+23	11	Relegation to the 2024–25 Saudi Women's Second Division League

Source: SAFF
Rules for classification: 1) Points; 2) Goal difference; 3) Number of goals scored.

== Final stages ==
=== Group A ===
Pos	Team	Pld	W	D	L	GF	GA	GD	Pts	Qualification or relegation	TRJ	PHX	UEG
1	Al-Taraji	2	2	0	0	11	4	+7	6	advance to the Semi-finals	—	—	8–2
2	Phoenix	2	1	0	1	7	3	+4	3		2–3	—	—
3	United Eagles	2	0	0	2	2	13	−11	0		—	0–5	—

Source: SAFF
Rules for classification: 1) Points; 2) Goal difference; 3) Number of goals scored.

=== Group B ===
Pos	Team	Pld	W	D	L	GF	GA	GD	Pts	Qualification or relegation	TQD	HMM	SHO
1	Al-Taqadom	2	2	0	0	3	0	+3	6	advance to the Semi-finals	—	2–0	—
2	Al-Hmmah	2	1	0	1	3	2	+1	3		—	—	3–0
3	Al-Shoulla	2	0	0	2	0	4	−4	0		0–1	—	—

Source: SAFF
Rules for classification: 1) Points; 2) Goal difference; 3) Number of goals scored.

=== Group C ===
Pos	Team	Pld	W	D	L	GF	GA	GD	Pts	Qualification or relegation	AML	JED	NEO
1	Al-Amal	2	2	0	0	12	3	+9	6	advance to the Semi-finals	—	7–3	—
2	Jeddah	2	0	1	1	4	8	−4	1		—	—	1–1
3	NEOM	2	0	1	1	1	6	−5	1		0–5	—	—

Source: SAFF
Rules for classification: 1) Points; 2) Goal difference; 3) Number of goals scored.

=== Group D ===
Pos	Team	Pld	W	D	L	GF	GA	GD	Pts	Qualification or relegation	ULA	ABH	BYR
1	Al-Ula	2	1	1	0	6	1	+5	4	advance to the Semi-finals	—	1–1	—
2	Abha	2	1	1	0	4	1	+3	4		—	—	3–0
3	Al-Bayraq	2	0	0	2	0	8	−8	−3		0–5	—	—

Source: SAFF
Rules for classification: 1) Points; 2) Goal difference; 3) Number of goals scored.

=== Knockout stage ===
==== Bracket ====
Semi-finals
10 March – Jeddah
Al-Taraji	1
Al-Taqadom	0
10 March – Jeddah
Al-Amal	0
Al-Ula	3

Final
13 March – Jeddah
Al-Taraji	1 (2)
Al-Ula	1 (4)
Third Place match
13 March – Jeddah
Al-Taqadom	1
Al-Amal	3

==== Semi-finals ====
10 March 2024
17:00

Al-Taraji	1–0	Al-Taqadom
Al-Ansari 49'	Report

King Abdullah Sports City Reserve Stadium D, Jeddah
10 March 2024
21:00

Al-Amal	0–3	Al-Ula
	Report	Tuani 67', 77'; Jaine 90+1'

King Abdullah Sports City Reserve Stadium D, Jeddah

==== Third Place match ====
13 March 2024
20:30

Al-Taqadom	1–3	Al-Amal
Elmitwalli 28'	Report	Merrouche 25', 52'; Bouhani 60'

King Abdullah Sports City Reserve Stadium D, Jeddah

==== Final ====
13 March 2024
23:30

Al-Taraji	1–1 (a.e.t.)	Al-Ula
Messaoud 35'	Report	Kapetanović 11'
Penalties
	2–4

King Abdullah Sports City Reserve Stadium D, Jeddah

== Top scorers ==
Rank	Player	Club	Goals
1	(Tunisia) Wafe Messaoud	Al-Taraji	36
2	(Guinea) Fanta Camara	Abha	33
3	(Ivory Coast) Mariam Camara	Golden Eagles	31
4	(Tunisia) Aya Jeddi	Al-Shoulla	29
5	(Tunisia) Dhekra Mahfoudh	Al-Taraji	27
6	(Algeria) Kenza Hadjar	Al-Bayraq	25
