= Violet Wanyonyi =

Kenyan footballer (born 2000)

Personal information
- Full name: Violet Nanjala Wanyonyi
- Date of birth: 20 January 2000 (age 26)
- Place of birth: Kenya
- Position: Forward

Team information
- Current team: United Eagles

Youth career
- 2018–2019: Archbishop Njenga Girls

Senior career*
Years	Team	Apps	(Gls)
2020–	Trans Nzoia Falcons	14	(21)
2021	Vihiga Queens		
2022–2025	AM Laâyoune	75	(71)
2025–	United Eagles	11	(9)

International career^{‡}
2021–	Kenya	7	(2)
- * Club domestic league appearances and goals as of 26 September 2025 ‡ National team caps and goals as of 26 February 2025

Violet Nanjala Wanyonyi (born 20 January 2000) is a Kenyan professional footballer who plays as a forward for Saudi Women's First Division League club United Eagles and the Kenya national football team.

== Club career ==
Wanyonyi, a native of Webuye in Bungoma County, began her football journey at Misemwa Primary School. She later moved on to Utithi Secondary School in Makueni before joining Archbishop Njenga Girls High School in Kakamega in 2018. A year later, in 2019, she was honored as the School Player of the Year.

In 2020, she signed with Trans Nzoia Falcons Ladies Football Club, making her debut in the top-tier Kenyan Women's Premier League. During her first season, she finished as the league's second-highest goalscorer with 21 goals, just behind Thika Queens' Mwanalima Adam Jereko.

In 2021, she joined Kenya's most successful women's football club, Vihiga Queens, with whom she competed in the CAF Women's Champions League CECAFA Qualifiers and later in the inaugural finals of the tournament, scoring a total of five goals. Her impressive performances earned her a nomination for the Most Promising Girl at the Kenyan Sports Personality of the Year in December 2021, where she finished as runner-up.

=== AM Laâyoune ===
After undergoing trials in early March 2022, Wanyonyi signed a two-year contract with AMFF Laâyoune in September of the same year. After seven matches, the Harambee Starlets striker had already made a strong impression, scoring seven goals in seven appearances to lead the scoring charts at the time. After her two-year contract ended, she was set to join Israel's Ligat Nashim; however, the deal fell through due to escalating security concerns amid the ongoing Gaza war. Consequently, the Laâyoune-based club offered her a contract extension for another season, which she accepted, rejoining them for the 2024–25 season. With a dominant performance throughout the season, she finished as the league's top goalscorer, netting 28 goals in 26 games.

=== United Eagles ===
In September 2024, Wanyonyi joined Saudi Women's First Division League side United Eagles ahead of the 2025–26 season.

== International career ==
In October 2021, Wanyonyi received her maiden call-up to the Kenya national senior women's team for the 2022 Women's Africa Cup of Nations qualifiers against South Sudan.

=== International goals ===
Scores and results list Kenya's goal tally first, score column indicates score after each Wanyonyi goal.

No.	Date	Venue	Opponent	Score	Result	Competition
1.	17 June 2025	Azam Complex Stadium, Chamazi, Tanzania	Uganda	3–0	4–0	2025 CECAFA Championship
2.	19 June 2025	Azam Complex Stadium, Chamazi, Tanzania	South Sudan	2–0	4–0	2025 CECAFA Championship

== Honours ==
Vihiga Queens

- CECAFA Women's Champions League: 2021

Individual

- Moroccan Women's Championship D1 Top scorer: 2024–25

== Career statistics ==
Club	Season	Division	League		Cup		Continental		Total	
Club	Season	Division	Apps	Goals	Apps	Goals	Apps	Goals	Apps	Goals
Trans Nzoia Queens	2020-21	Kenyan Women's Premier League	14	21					14	21
Vihiga Queens	2021-22	Kenyan Women's Premier League					6	5	6	5
AMFF Laâyoune	2022-23	Moroccan Women's Championship	25	23					25	23
AMFF Laâyoune	2023-24	Moroccan Women's Championship	24	20	3	4			27	24
AMFF Laâyoune	2024-25	Moroccan Women's Championship	26	28					26	28
AMFF Laâyoune	Total		75	71	3	4			78	75
Flames United	2025-26	Saudi Women's First Division League	13	9					13	9
Total career			102	101	3	4	6	5	111	110
