= Yara Al-Faris =

Saudi footballer (born 2002)

Personal information
- Full name: Yara Mazin Al-Faris
- Date of birth: 14 December 2002 (age 23)
- Place of birth: Saudi Arabia
- Position: Winger

Team information
- Current team: Al Qadsiah FC
- Number: 11

Senior career*
Years	Team	Apps	(Gls)
2021–2022	Oasis W.F.C		
2022–2024	Al-Taraji		
2024–	Al Qadsiah FC		

International career
2024–	Saudi Arabia Futsal		
- * Club domestic league appearances and goals

Yara Mazin Al-Faris (Arabic: يارا مازن الفارس; born 14 December 2002) is a Saudi footballer who plays as a winger for Saudi Women's Premier League club Al Qadsiah FC.

== Club career ==
Al-Faris started playing with Oasis W.F.C in 2021, After the acquisition of Oasis W.F.C by the Al-Taraji, she became part of the club.

In April 2023, Al-Faris won the top scorer award in the first edition of the Women's Futsal Tournament

In the 2023/2024 season, Yara Al-Faris contributed as a captain to the qualification of Al-Taraji from the Saudi Women's First Division League to the Saudi Women's Premier League, where she scored 13 goals.

In July 2024, Al Qadsiah FC announced the signing of Al-Faris with a contract extending until 2026.

== International career ==
In May 2024, Al-Faris joined the Saudi Arabia Futsal for the first time, to attend a training camp in Sarajevo, Bosnia and Herzegovina.

== Honours ==
=== Club ===
Al-Taraji

- Saudi Women's First Division League:

(silver) Second place: 2023–24
