= Al Wehda FC (women) =

Saudi football club

Al-Wehda
- Full name: Al-Wehda Football Club
- Nickname(s): Farisat Mecca (Knights of Mecca)
- Founded: 2022 (as Glory of the West); 2023 (as Al-Wehda)
- Ground: King Abdul Aziz Stadium, Mecca
- League: Saudi Women's First Division League
- 2023–24: SW1DL, 13th of 26
Home colours	Away colours	Third colours

Al-Wehda Women's Football Club, known as Al-Wehda Ladies (Arabic: سيدات الوحدة), is a Saudi Arabian women's football club from Mecca that competes in the Saudi Women's First Division League.

== History ==
Founded in 2022 as Glory of the West (Arabic: مجد الغربية, romanized: Majd Al-Gharbiah), the club was the first and only women's football team in Mecca at the time. Participating in the inaugural edition of the Saudi Women's First Division League, the team finished last in the West Region group winless.

In 2023, ahead of the 2023–24 season, Al Wehda acquired Majd Al-Gharbiah to act as its women's section for the upcoming season. The acquisition resulted in the signing of professional foreign players to strengthen the team. Placed in West Group 3, Al Wehda fell short of qualifying for the final stages of the First Division, resulting in their relegation to the newly established Second Division League.

In July 2024, the Saudi Arabian Football Federation announced that, following Al-Taqadom's withdrawal from the First Division, their spot was awarded to Al Wehda.

== Current squad ==
As of 11 February 2024

Note: Flags indicate national team as defined under FIFA eligibility rules; some limited exceptions apply. Players may hold more than one non-FIFA nationality.

No.	Pos.	Nation	Player
—	GK	(Tunisia) TUN	Nesrine Zizi
—	DF	(Saudi Arabia) KSA	Rahaf Barakaty
3	DF	(Palestine) PLE	Shatha Alfarra
17	DF	(Saudi Arabia) KSA	Nadeen Kaaki
—	DF	(Saudi Arabia) KSA	Nada Al-Ghamdi
—	MF	(Tunisia) TUN	Chaima Ben Mohamed
—	MF	(Saudi Arabia) KSA	Maram Al-Towairqi
—	MF	(Saudi Arabia) KSA	Baheya Eid
12	FW	(Tunisia) TUN	Ibtissem Ben Mohamed

No.	Pos.	Nation	Player
—	FW	(Saudi Arabia) KSA	Al-Hanouf Mazuzah
—	FW	(Saudi Arabia) KSA	Dana Fahad
—	DF	(Saudi Arabia) KSA	Dania Abu Laban
8	DF	(Saudi Arabia) KSA	Badrea Al-Jedeai
—	MF	(Saudi Arabia) KSA	Imtenan Al-Ghamdi
15	DF	(Saudi Arabia) KSA	Nouf Al-Yamani
—		(Saudi Arabia) KSA	Aseel Al-Harbi
6		(Saudi Arabia) KSA	Al-Sudof Asiri
7	FW	(Tunisia) TUN	Eya Mejri

== Competitive record ==
=== Domestic ===
Season	Div.	Position	W	D	L	Pts	GF – GA	Top scorer	SAFF Cup
as Majd Al-Gharbiah
2022–23	SW1Dl	14th of 17	0	0	4	0	3–42	Unknown	—
as Al Wehda
2023–24	SW1Dl	13th of 26	4	1	3	13	34–14	(Tunisia) Ibtissem Ben Mohamed	DNQ
