= Maria Al-Najjar =

Saudi footballer (born 2006)

Personal information
- Full name: Maria Gassan Al-Najjar
- Date of birth: 4 January 2006 (age 20)
- Place of birth: Saudi Arabia
- Position: Goalkeeper

Team information
- Current team: Al-Taraji
- Number: 1

Senior career*
Years	Team	Apps	(Gls)
2024–2025	United Eagles		
2025–2026	Al-Nahda		
2025–	Al-Taraji		

International career
2025–	Saudi Arabia U20		
- * Club domestic league appearances and goals

Maria Gassan Al-Najjar (Arabic: ماريا غسان النجار; born 4 January 2006) is a Saudi footballer who plays as a Goalkeeper for Saudi Women's Premier League club Al-Taraji.

== Club career ==
Maria Al-Najjar participated in the first edition of the Girls’ Schools League 2022 known as (Dawri Madaris).

In addition to her participation with the United Eagles in the Saudi Women's First Division League, Al-Najjar participated in the third edition of the 2025 Saudi Women's Futsal Tournament, winning the title with them and receiving the Best Goalkeeper award.

In the summer of 2025, Al-Nahda signed Al-Najjar to participate with them in the 2025–26 season of the Saudi Women's First Division League.

In the summer of 2026, Al-Najjar moved to Al-Taraji to play for them in the 2026-27 Saudi Women's Premier League.

== International career ==
On 18 February 2025, Maria Al-Najjar joined the Saudi Arabia u-20 women's national football team with Scottish coach Pauline Hamill in the Jeddah camp.

== Honours ==
=== United Eagles ===
- Saudi Women's Futsal Tournament

(gold) Champion :2025

Individual

- Saudi Women's Futsal Tournament Best goalkeeper: 2025

=== Al-Nahda ===
Individual

- Saudi Women's First Division League Best goalkeeper: 2025-26
