= Salwa Elmitwalli =

Egyptian footballer

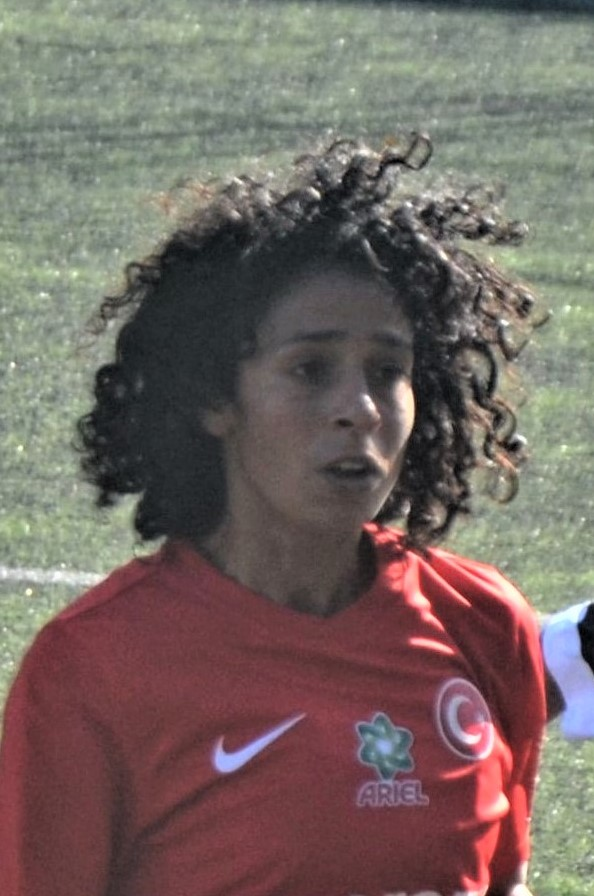
- Salwa Elmitwalli playing for Ataşehir Belediyespor in the 2018–19 season

Personal information
- Full name: Salwa Mansour Ismail Elmitwalli
- Date of birth: 15 May 1990 (age 36)
- Place of birth: Egypt
- Positions: Forward; midfielder

Team information
- Current team: Al-Shoulla
- Number: 14

Senior career*
Years	Team	Apps	(Gls)
2010–2013	Saku Sporting	3	(2)
2013–2018	Wadi Degla		
2018–2020	Ataşehir Belediyespor	6	(0)
2020–2021	SAK		
2021–2023	ACS Piroș Security		
2023–2024	Al-Taqadom	12	(21)
2024–	Al-Shoulla	4	(3)

International career
2008–	Egypt	+15	(+5)
- * Club domestic league appearances and goals as of 19 October 2024

Salwa Mansour Ismail Elmitwalli (Arabic: سلوى منصور إسماعيل المتولي; born 15 May 1990) known as Sally Mansour (Arabic: سالي منصور) is an Egyptian footballer who plays as a midfielder for Al-Shoulla in the Saudi Women's First Division League and the Egypt national football team.

== Club career ==
For her first experience abroad, Sally joined the Estonian club EVL Saku Sporting in the second division in 2010, where she scored two goals in her three caps. In July 2013, she participated in the "Discover Football" tournament, a women's football event held in Berlin, Germany, featuring eight teams from various countries. During the tournament, she scored one goal for her team, Wadi Degla from Cairo. In 2018, she returned to Turkey, signing with Ataşehir Belediyespor on October 25 to compete in the 2018–19 Turkish Women's First Football League.

In July 2023, Al-Taqadom announced the signing of Elmitwalli ahead of its debut at the 2023–24 Saudi Women's First Division League.

Following the establishment of Al Ahly SC's women's section, Sally was signed as an experienced addition to reinforce the squad. However, in September 2024, she parted ways with Al Ahly and secured a move to Al-Shoulla in the Saudi Women's First Division League, stating that the agreed terms of her contract were not upheld, prompting her to terminate the deal.

== International career ==
Sally Mansour is an Egyptian international, She has earned caps for the Egypt women's national football team in key regional competitions, including the 2009 UNAF Women's Tournament and the 2021 Arab Women's Cup.

On 6 November 2009, She scored her first goal for the country in a 2–6 loss to Tunisia.

== Career statistics ==
=== International ===
Scores and results list Egypt's goal tally first, score column indicates score after each Elmitwalli goal.

List of international goals scored by Salwa Elmitwalli
No.	Date	Venue	Opponent	Score	Result	Competition	Ref.
1	6 November 2009	El Menzah Stadium, Tunis, Tunisia	Tunisia	2–5	2–6	2009 UNAF Women's Tournament	
2	1 March 2015	Kenyatta Stadium, Machakos, Kenya	Kenya	1–0	1–0	Friendly	
3	24 August 2022	Police Academy Stadium, Cairo, Egypt	Sudan	10–0	10–0	2021 Arab Women's Cup	
4	27 August 2022	Police Academy Stadium, Cairo, Egypt	Lebanon	1–0	4–0	2021 Arab Women's Cup	
5	3 September 2022	Osman Ahmed Osman Stadium, Cairo, Egypt	Jordan	2–4	2–5	2021 Arab Women's Cup	
