= 2024–25 Saudi Women's Second Division League =

Saudi Women's Second Division League
- Season: 2024–25
- Dates: 1 November 2024 – 19 February 2025
- Champions: Najmat Jeddah
- Matches: 88
- Goals: 621 (7.06 per match)
- Best Player: (Ethiopia) Netsanet Muluneh
- Top goalscorer: (Nigeria) Yetunde Balogun (37 goals)
- Best goalkeeper: (Chad) Amna Saleh
- All statistics correct as of 19 February 2025.

The 2024–25 Saudi Women's Second Division League (Arabic: دوري الدرجة الثانية للسيدات لموسم 2024–2025) was the inaugural season of the Saudi Women's Second Division League, the third tier of women's football league in Saudi Arabia. Najmat Jeddah claimed the inaugural title undefeated, becoming the league's first-ever champions.

== Teams ==
The inaugural edition will feature 25 teams, of which 12 were relegated from the 2023–24 Saudi Women's First Division League, while the remaining 13 did not participate in the previous season and are debuting in the women's competition.

- Al-Ain
- Artawi
- Al-Adalah
- Al-Fateh
- Al-Hejaz
- Al-Jawad
- Al-Khobar
- Al-Mahmal
- Al-Nahda
- Al-Nors
- Al-Orobah
- Al-Qwarah
- Al-Raed
- Al-Watani
- Al-Yarmouk
- Arar
- Flaij
- Golden Eagles
- Hetten
- Khaybar
- Manjam Al-Mawahib
- Mawahib Jeddah
- Najmat Jeddah
- Saham
- Shabab Taibah

The 25 participating teams were divided into five groups: two with six teams, one with five teams, and two with four teams each, all based on geographical locations. The teams will compete in centralized venues.

Locations of the 2024–25 Saudi Women's Second Division League

Grp	Teams	Location	Ground	Capacity
1	Artawi; Al-Mahmal; Al-Qwarah; Al-Raed; Arar; Golden Eagles	Buraydah	Reserve artificial of Al-Raed Club Stadium	
2	Al-Jawad; Al-Nors; Manjam Al-Mawahib; Mawahib Jeddah; Najmat Jeddah; Saham	Jeddah	Waad Academy Stadium	
3	Al-Adalah; Al-Fateh; Al-Khobar; Al-Nahda; Flaij	Al-Ahsa	APEX Sports Complex	
4	Al-Orobah; Al-Watani; Khaybar; Shabab Taibah	Medina	Prince Mohammed Bin Abdulaziz Stadium	20,000
5	Al-Ain; Al-Hejaz; Al-Yarmouk; Hetten	Al-Bahah	King Saud Sport City Stadium	10,000

== Group stage ==
=== Group 1 ===
Pos	Team	Pld	W	D	L	GF	GA	GD	Pts	Qualification or relegation	RAD	GDE	ART	ARR	MHM	QWR
1	Al-Raed (A)	6	5	1	0	47	1	+46	16	advance to the final stages	—	0–0	7–0	6–0	Canc.	Canc.
2	Golden Eagles	6	4	1	1	38	3	+35	13	advance to the final stages	1–3	—	14–0	17–0	Canc.	Canc.
3	Artawi	6	2	0	4	11	49	−38	3		0–21	0–3	—	6–2	Canc.	Canc.
4	Arar	6	0	0	6	4	47	−43	0		0–10	0–3	2–5	—	Canc.	Canc.
5	Al-Mahmal	0	0	0	0	0	0	0	0	Withdrew	Canc.	Canc.	Canc.	Canc.	—	Canc.
6	Al-Qwarah	0	0	0	0	0	0	0	0	Withdrew	Canc.	Canc.	Canc.	Canc.	Canc.	—

Source: SAFF
Rules for classification: 1) Points; 2) Goal difference; 3) Number of goals scored.
(A) Advance to a further round

=== Group 2 ===
Pos	Team	Pld	W	D	L	GF	GA	GD	Pts	Qualification or relegation	NJD	SAH	MNM	JWD	MJD	NOR
1	Najmat Jeddah (A)	10	10	0	0	104	5	+99	30	advance to the final stages	—	7–2	14–1	14–0	19–0	3–0
2	Saham	10	7	0	3	58	28	+30	18		1–13	—	5–2	6–1	0–3	3–0
3	Manjam Al-Mawahib	10	5	1	4	51	44	+7	16		0–12	0–9	—	4–2	8–0	10–0
4	Al-Jawad	10	4	1	5	43	47	−4	13		1–16	2–6	1–1	—	12–0	4–0
5	Mawahib Jeddah	10	2	1	7	7	69	−62	1		0–3	0–3	0–15	0–8	—	3–0
6	Al-Nors (E)	10	0	1	9	2	72	−70	−8		0–3	0–23	1–10	0–12	1–1	—

Source: SAFF
Rules for classification: 1) Points; 2) Goal difference; 3) Number of goals scored.
(A) Advance to a further round; (E) Eliminated

=== Group 3 ===
Pos	Team	Pld	W	D	L	GF	GA	GD	Pts	Qualification or relegation	NHD	FTH	KHB	FLJ	ADL
1	Al-Nahda (A)	8	6	1	1	23	5	+18	19	advance to the final stages	—	2–2	1–0	2–0	2–1
2	Al-Fateh	8	5	1	2	23	10	+13	16		0–3	—	1–2	2–1	7–1
3	Al-Khobar	8	5	1	2	22	6	+16	13		1–0	0–3	—	3–0	9–1
4	Flaij	8	0	3	5	5	22	−17	3		1–6	0–6	0–0	—	2–2
5	Al-Adalah	8	0	2	6	7	37	−30	2		0–7	1–2	0–7	1–1	—

Source: SAFF
Rules for classification: 1) Points; 2) Goal difference; 3) Number of goals scored.
(A) Advance to a further round

=== Group 4 ===
Pos	Team	Pld	W	D	L	GF	GA	GD	Pts	Qualification or relegation	KHY	ORB	STB	WAT
1	Khaybar (A)	4	3	0	1	10	1	+9	9	advance to the final stages	—	4–0	3–0	Canc.
2	Al-Orobah	4	3	0	1	11	4	+7	9	advance to the final stages	1–0	—	7–0	Canc.
3	Shabab Taibah	4	0	0	4	0	16	−16	−9		0–3	0–3	—	Canc.
4	Al-Watani	0	0	0	0	0	0	0	0	Withdrew	Canc.	Canc.	Canc.	—

Source: SAFF
Rules for classification: 1) Points; 2) Goal difference; 3) Number of goals scored.
(A) Advance to a further round

=== Group 5 ===
Pos	Team	Pld	W	D	L	GF	GA	GD	Pts	Qualification or relegation	YAR	HET	HEJ	AIN
1	Al-Yarmouk (A)	6	5	0	1	47	6	+41	15	advance to the final stages	—	7–2	0–4	12–0
2	Hetten	6	4	0	2	30	11	+19	12	advance to the final stages	0–4	—	4–0	15–0
3	Al-Hejaz	6	3	0	3	27	16	+11	9		0–8	0–4	—	10–0
4	Al-Ain	6	0	0	6	0	71	−71	0		0–16	0–5	0–13	—

Source: SAFF
Rules for classification: 1) Points; 2) Goal difference; 3) Number of goals scored.
(A) Advance to a further round

=== Ranking of second-placed teams ===
Due to groups having a different number of teams, results against fifth-placed teams in five-team groups and results against both fifth-placed and sixth-placed teams in six-team groups were excluded from this ranking.

Pos	Grp	Team	Pld	W	D	L	GF	GA	GD	Pts	Qualification or relegation
1	4	Al-Orobah	4	3	0	1	11	4	+7	9	advance to the final stages
2	1	Golden Eagles	4	2	1	1	18	3	+15	7	advance to the final stages
3	5	Hetten	4	2	0	2	10	11	−1	6	advance to the final stages
4	2	Saham	4	2	0	2	17	22	−5	6	
5	3	Al-Fateh	4	1	1	2	6	7	−1	4	

Source: SAFF
Rules for classification: 1) Points; 2) Goal difference; 3) Number of goals scored.

== Final stages ==
The final stages will be conducted in a knockout format, beginning with the quarter-finals as single-elimination matches, where the winners and runners-up will qualify for the 2025–26 Saudi Women's First Division League.

Qualified teams

Group	Winners	Runners-up (best three qualify)
1	Al-Raed	Golden Eagles
2	Najmat Jeddah	—N/a
3	Al-Nahda	—N/a
4	Khaybar	Al-Orobah
5	Al-Yarmouk	Hetten

=== Draw ===
The draw will be held on 14 January 2025. For the quarter-finals, teams were seeded based on their performance in the group stage. The best four group winners were placed in Pot 1 while the rest where placed in Pot 2.

Pot 1	Pot 2
Najmat Jeddah; Al-Raed; Al-Yarmouk; Khaybar	Al-Nahda; Al-Orobah; Golden Eagles; Hetten

=== Bracket ===
Quarter-finals
12 February
Al-Raed	1 (1)
Al-Nahda (p)	1 (4)
12 February
Khaybar	2
Hetten	0
13 February
Najmat Jeddah	8
Golden Eagles	0
13 February
Al-Yarmouk	15
Al-Orobah	0

Semi-finals
16 February
Al-Nahda	3
Khaybar	0
16 February
Najmat Jeddah	4
Al-Yarmouk	1

Final
19 February
Al-Nahda	0
Najmat Jeddah	5
Third place
19 February
Khaybar	1
Al-Yarmouk	10

== Season statistics ==
=== Top scorers ===
As of 3 January 2025

Rank	Player	Club	Goals
1	(Nigeria) Yetunde Balogun	Najmat Jeddah	37
2	(Ethiopia) Netsanet Muluneh	Najmat Jeddah	35
3	(Algeria) Amal Mokrane	Manjam Al-Mawahib	31
4	(Tunisia) Ashwak Farhat	Al-Yarmouk	23
4	(Tunisia) Chayma Ghribi	Saham	23
6	(Egypt) Norhane Hassan	Golden Eagles	19
7	(Tunisia) Mofida Hamda	Saham	17
8	(Saudi Arabia) Wafa Makhdan	Al-Raed	15
9	(Saudi Arabia) Reem Tarek	Al-Jawad	14
10	(Saudi Arabia) Shahad Mohammed	Al-Jawad	12
