= Rahaf =

Rahaf is a feminine given name of Arabic origin. Notable people with the name include:

== Given name ==
- Rahaf Al-Mansouri (born 1997), Saudi footballer
- Rahaf Mohammed (born 2000), Saudi refugee
