= 2022–23 Saudi Women's Premier League =

First season of the Saudi Women's Premier League

Saudi Women's Premier League
- Season: 2022–23
- Dates: 13 October 2022 – 18 February 2023
- Champions: Al-Nassr (1st title)
- Relegated: Sama
- Matches: 56
- Goals: 351 (6.27 per match)
- Best Player: (Saudi Arabia) Mubarkh Al-Saiari
- Top goalscorer: (Iraq) Shokhan Salihi (43 goals)
- Best goalkeeper: (Saudi Arabia) Laila Al-Qahtani
- Biggest home win: Al-Shabab 19–0 Sama; 11 February 2023
- Biggest away win: Sama 0–18 Al-Nassr; 13 October 2022
- Highest scoring: Al-Shabab 19–0 Sama; 11 February 2023
- Longest winning run: 6 Games; Al-Hilal
- Longest unbeaten run: 8 Games; Al-Nassr
- Longest winless run: 14 Games; Sama
- Longest losing run: 14 Games; Sama

The 2022–23 Saudi Women's Premier League was the inaugural season of the Saudi Women's Premier League, established as the top-tier women's football league in Saudi Arabia.

Al-Nassr were crowned the inaugural champions of the league after defeating Al-Yamamah on the final matchday.

== Overview ==
On 15 September 2022, the Saudi Arabian Football Federation announced the launch of a revamped women's football pyramid, introducing the Saudi Women's Premier League and the Saudi Women's First Division League.

The eight teams that reached the knockout stage of the 2021–22 Saudi National Women's League qualified for the inaugural season of the Saudi Women's Premier League. Ahead of the league's launch, several professional Saudi clubs acquired existing women's teams in order to participate in the competition. Al-Hilal and Al-Nassr were confirmed as participants after acquiring Challenge WFC and Al-Mamlaka WFC, the runners-up and champions of the 2021–22 Saudi National Women's League, respectively.

Prior to the start of the league in October 2022, additional professional clubs followed suit. Al-Ittihad acquired Jeddah Eagles, while Al-Ahli and Al-Shabab acquired Miraas Jeddah WFC and Storm WFC, respectively.

== Teams ==
Eight teams contested the 2022–23 Women's Premier League season. The eight teams that advanced to the knockout stage of the 2021–22 women's football league were confirmed as the participants for the inaugural season.

Locations of the 2022–23 Women's Premier League teams

Team	Location	Ground	Capacity	Appearance
Al-Nassr	Riyadh	King Saud University Stadium	26,000	1st
Al-Hilal	Riyadh	Inaya Medical Colleges Stadium	68,752	1st
Al-Yamamah	Riyadh	Prince Faisal Sports City Stadium	22,188	1st
Al-Ittihad	Jeddah	Al-Ittihad Club Stadium	15,000	1st
Eastern Flames	Dammam	Prince Mohamed bin Fahd Stadium	26,000	1st
Al-Shabab	Riyadh	Prince Faisal Sports City Stadium	22,188	1st
Sama	Riyadh	Prince Faisal Sports City Stadium	22,188	1st
Al-Ahli	Jeddah	Prince Mohammed Al-Faisal Stadium	10,000	1st

=== Personnel and kits ===
Team	Manager	Captain	Kit manufacturer	Shirt sponsor
Al-Nassr	(Saudi Arabia) Abdulaziz Al-Alwni	(Saudi Arabia) Munira Al-Hamdan	Duneus	KAFD, Harrys Pizza
Al-Hilal	(Saudi Arabia) Mashael Al-Rashidi	(Saudi Arabia) Ahod Al-Amari	S Team	BLU Store, Jahez, Tawuniya, Floward, Shawarmer
Al-Yamamah		(Saudi Arabia) Moudi Abdulmehsen		Dunkin' Donuts, Comprehensive Sports Medicine, MOVE, Tabz, Deep Art, Biotic
Al-Ittihad		(Saudi Arabia) Bayan Sadagah	Erreà	Darco, SAL, Emkan, Tameeni, Yelo, Oud Al-Amoudi
Eastern Flames	(Saudi Arabia) Maram Al-Butairi	(Saudi Arabia) Mariam Al-Tamimi	Offside	PERPETUAL, CureMed
Al-Shabab	(Egypt) Marwa El-Hawat	(Saudi Arabia) Raghad Mukhayzin	Offside	Almozaini, Half Million, Mekyal, Azom, Bandar Real Estate
Sama		(Saudi Arabia) Noura Al-Athel		MSK Care, Al Madenah Water
Al-Ahli	(Jordan) Manar Fraij	(Saudi Arabia) Taqyah Rashwan	Xtep	MG Cars, Boga Super Foods, Dorrah for Real Estate, Saudi German Hospital

== Foreign players ==
The following is a list of the foreign players who participated this season:

Al-Nassr	Al-Hilal	Al-Yamamah	Al-Ittihad
(Bahrain) Hessa Al-Isa; (Bahrain) Yasmeen Fayez; (Brazil) Izabela Stahelin; (Brazil) Marina Höher; (France) Lina Boussaha; (Jordan) Maysa Jbarah; (Tunisia) Samia Aouni; (Tunisia) Ghada Ayadi	(Brazil) Mayara Gonçalves; (Brazil) Jéssica Graziela; (Egypt) Eman Hassan; (Egypt) Fadwa Essameddine; (Ghana) Elizabeth Addo; (Iraq) Shokhan Salihi; (Iraq) Direen Mulla Bakr; (Lebanon) Dima Al Kasti	(Algeria) Besma Benlakhlef; (Algeria) Kenza Hadjar; (Denmark) Anja Wilfling; (Egypt) Omnia Mahmoud; (Iraq) Tbarek Al-Ghazawi; (Jordan) Mai Sweilem; (Tunisia) Chaima Abbassi; (United States) Gabriela Pelogi	(Bhutan) Deki Lhazom; (Egypt) Norhan Taqsera; (Egypt) Sara Abdallah; (Iraq) Zainab Al-Lami; (Jordan) Ayah Al-Majali; (Jordan) Malak Shannak; (Jordan) Shahnaz Jebreen
Eastern Flames	Al-Shabab	Sama	Al-Ahli
(Algeria) Aïcha Aguichari; (Colombia) Ximena Mideros; (Colombia) Sara Toro; (Georgia (country)) Ana Cheminava; (Morocco) Hassania Alaidi; (Morocco) Nassima Jawad; (Tunisia) Meriem Sassi	(Egypt) Hayam Abdellatif; (Egypt) Noha Tarek; (Ethiopia) Netsanet Muluneh; (Lebanon) Nancy Tchaylian; (Uganda) Ruth Aturo	(Morocco) Salma Steteen; (Morocco) Nourimane Oddah	(Algeria) Abla Bensenouci; (Ghana) Cecilia Hagan; (Morocco) Ibtissam Jraïdi; (Tunisia) Salima Jobrani; (Tunisia) Sana Yaakoubi; (Tunisia) Yasmine Jemai; (Tunisia) Aya Jeddi

== League table ==
Pos	Team	Pld	W	D	L	GF	GA	GD	Pts	Relegation
1	Al-Nassr (C)	14	11	2	1	67	19	+48	35	Champions
2	Al-Hilal	14	10	2	2	76	23	+53	32	
3	Al-Shabab	14	8	2	4	53	25	+28	26	
4	Al-Yamamah	14	6	3	5	40	15	+25	21	
5	Al-Ittihad	14	5	6	3	46	19	+27	21	
6	Al-Ahli	14	5	1	8	35	33	+2	16	
7	Eastern Flames	14	2	2	10	33	44	−11	8	
8	Sama (R)	14	0	0	14	1	173	−172	0	Relegation to the 2023–24 Saudi Women's First Division League

Source: SAFF
Rules for classification: 1) Points; 2) Goal difference; 3) Number of goals scored. Qualification and relegation column definitions
(C) Champions; (R) Relegated

== Results ==
On 15 September 2021, SAFF released the match schedule.

Home \ Away	NAS	HIL	YAM	ITH	EFL	ASB	SAM	AHI
Al-Nassr	—	2–0	3–2	1–1	5–1	3–3	11–0	4–3
Al-Hilal	6–3	—	0–0	4–4	3–1	3–2	18–0	6–1
Al-Yamamah	0–3	1–2	—	4–1	3–1	0–1	13–0	1–0
Al-Ittihad	1–2	3–1	0–0	—	1–1	2–2	11–0	3–1
Eastern Flames	1–4	1–5	1–6	2–2	—	3–4	11–0	1–5
Al-Shabab	1–4	2–4	3–0	1–0	4–0	—	19–0	2–1
Sama	0–18	0–18	0–10	0–14	0–8	0–8	—	1–9
Al-Ahli	0–4	3–6	0–0	0–3	2–1	5–1	5–0	—

Source: SAFF
Legend: Blue = home team win; Yellow = draw; Red = away team win.

== Season statistics ==
As of 18 February 2023

=== Top scorers ===
Rank	Player	Club	Goals
1	(Iraq) Shokhan Salihi	Al-Hilal	43
2	(Morocco) Ibtissam Jraïdi	Al-Ahli	17
3	(Bahrain) Hessa AlIsa	Al-Nassr	15
3	(Egypt) Noha Tarek	Al-Shabab	15
5	(Saudi Arabia) Daliah Abu Laban	Al-Shabab	11
6	(Jordan) Maysa Jbarah	Al-Nassr	10
7	(Iraq) Zainab Abbas	Al-Ittihad	9
7	(Saudi Arabia) Seba Tawfiq	Al-Ittihad	9
9	(Colombia) Sara Toro	Eastern Flames	8
9	(Ethiopia) Netsanet Muluneh	Al-Shabab	8
9	(Ghana) Elizabeth Addo	Al-Hilal	8
9	(Saudi Arabia) Lulu Osama	Al-Yamamah	8
9	(Morocco) Nassima Jawad	Eastern Flames	8

=== Clean sheets ===
Rank	Player	Club	Clean sheets
1	(Saudi Arabia) Sara Khalid	Al-Nassr	5
2	(Saudi Arabia) Laila Al-Qahtani	Al-Yamamah	2
2	(Saudi Arabia) Hessa Al-Sudairy	Al-Ittihad	2
2	(Uganda) Ruth Aturo	Al-Shabab	2

=== Hat-tricks ===
Player	For	Against	Result	Date	Ref.
(Saudi Arabia) Munira Al-Hamdan	Al-Nassr	Sama	18–0 (A)	13 October 2022	
(Saudi Arabia) Mubarkh Al-Saiari	Al-Nassr	Sama	18–0 (A)	13 Oct 2022	
(Bahrain) Hessa AlIsa (2)	Al-Nassr	Sama	18–0 (A)	13 October 2022	
(Bahrain) Hessa AlIsa (2)	Al-Nassr	Sama	11–0 (H)	17 December 2022	
(Tunisia) Ghada Ayadi	Al-Nassr	Sama	18–0 (A)	13 October 2022	
(Saudi Arabia) Lulu Osama (2)	Al-Yamamah	Eastern Flames	3–1 (H)	14 October 2022	
(Saudi Arabia) Lulu Osama (2)	Al-Yamamah	Sama	13–0 (H)	24 January 2023	
(Iraq) Shokhan Salihi (7)	Al-Hilal	Al-Shabab	4–2 (A)	14 October 2022	
(Iraq) Shokhan Salihi (7)	Al-Hilal	Eastern Flames	3–1 (H)	12 November 2022	
(Iraq) Shokhan Salihi (7)	Al-Hilal	Sama	18–0 (A)	19 November 2022	
(Iraq) Shokhan Salihi (7)	Al-Hilal	Al-Ahli	6–1 (H)	2 December 2022	
(Iraq) Shokhan Salihi (7)	Al-Hilal	Al-Nassr	6–3 (H)	30 December 2022	
(Iraq) Shokhan Salihi (7)	Al-Hilal	Eastern Flames	5–1 (A)	24 January 2023	
(Iraq) Shokhan Salihi (7)	Al-Hilal	Sama	18–0 (H)	31 January 2023	
(Lebanon) Nancy Tchaylian	Al-Shabab	Al-Nassr	3–3 (A)	21 October 2022	
(Saudi Arabia) Al Bandari Mobarak	Al-Yamamah	Sama	10–0 (A)	12 November 2022	
(Morocco) Hassania Alaidi	Eastern Flames	Sama	11–0 (H)	2 December 2022	
(Morocco) Nassima Jawad	Eastern Flames	Sama	11–0 (H)	2 December 2022	
(Iraq) Zainab Al-Lami (2)	Al-Ittihad	Sama	11–0 (H)	6 December 2022	
(Iraq) Zainab Al-Lami (2)	Al-Ittihad	Sama	14–0 (A)	30 December 2022	
(Saudi Arabia) Seba Tawfiq (2)	Al-Ittihad	Sama	11–0 (H)	6 December 2022	
(Saudi Arabia) Seba Tawfiq (2)	Al-Ittihad	Sama	14–0 (A)	30 December 2022	
(Egypt) Noha Tarek	Al-Shabab	Sama	8–0 (A)	9 December 2022	
(Jordan) Maysa Jbarah	Al-Nassr	Sama	11–0 (H)	17 Dec 2022	
(Morocco) Ibtissam Jraïdi (4)	Al-Ahli	Sama	9–1 (H)	23 Dec 2022	
(Morocco) Ibtissam Jraïdi (4)	Al-Ahli	Al-Nassr	3–4 (A)	24 January 2023	
(Morocco) Ibtissam Jraïdi (4)	Al-Ahli	Al-Shabab	5–1 (H)	31 January 2023	
(Morocco) Ibtissam Jraïdi (4)	Al-Ahli	Eastern Flames	5–1 (A)	11 February 2023	
(Saudi Arabia) Daliah Abu Laban (2)	Al-Shabab	Eastern Flames	4–3 (A)	31 December 2022	
(Saudi Arabia) Daliah Abu Laban (2)	Al-Shabab	Sama	19–0 (H)	11 February 2023	
(Saudi Arabia) Ahod Alamari	Al-Hilal	Sama	18–0 (H)	31 January 2023	
(Ghana) Elizabeth Addo (2)	Al-Hilal	Sama	18–0 (H)	31 January 2023	
(Ghana) Elizabeth Addo (2)	Al-Hilal	Al-Ittihad	4–4 (H)	11 February 2023	
(Saudi Arabia) Abeer Nasser	Al-Hilal	Sama	18–0 (H)	31 January 2023	
(Saudi Arabia) Areej Al-Anizi	Al-Hilal	Sama	18–0 (H)	31 January 2023	
(Egypt) Noha Tarek	Al-Shabab	Sama	19–0 (H)	11 February 2023	
(Ethiopia) Netsanet Muluneh	Al-Shabab	Sama	19–0 (H)	11 February 2023	

=== Discipline ===
As of 18 February 2023

	Most yellow cards	Total	Most red cards	Total	Ref.
Player	(Saudi Arabia) Shaima Al-Tabei (Sama) (Saudi Arabia) Tahani Al-Zahrani (Al-Shabab) (Tunisia) Chaima Abassi (Al-Yamamah)	5	(Jordan) Ayah Al-Majali (Al-Ittihad) (Saudi Arabia) Munira Al-Hamdan (Al-Nassr) (Saudi Arabia) Raghad Mukhayzin (Al-Shabab) (Saudi Arabia) Ghada Malhan (Al-Shabab) (Saudi Arabia) Aseel Ahmed (Al-Nassr) (Saudi Arabia) Noura Ibrahim (Al Yamamah) (Saudi Arabia) Laila Al-Qahtani (Al-Yamamah) (Saudi Arabia) Al Bandari Mobarak (Al-Yamamah)	1	
Club	Al-Ahli	25	Al-Yamamah	3	
