= Nadeen Kaaki =

Saudi footballer (born 2005)

Personal information
- Full name: Nadeen Osama Kaaki
- Date of birth: 1 January 2005 (age 21)
- Place of birth: Saudi Arabia
- Position: Defender

Team information
- Current team: Al-Hmmah

Senior career*
Years	Team	Apps	(Gls)
2022–2023	Jeddah Pride		
2023–2024	Al Wehda FC		
2024–2025	Al-Ittihad		
2025	Jeddah		
2025–	Al-Hmmah		

International career
2023–2024	Saudi Arabia U20		
- * Club domestic league appearances and goals

Nadeen Osama Kaaki (Arabic: نادين أسامة كعكي; born 1 January 2005) is a Saudi footballer who plays as a Defender for Saudi Women's First Division League club Al-Hmmah.

== Club career ==
Kaaki started playing with Jeddah Pride in the 2022/2023 season of the Saudi Women's First Division League, achieving third place.

In the summer of 2023, Kaaki moved to Al Wehda, to participate with them in the Saudi Women's First Division League.

In the following season, 2023/2024, she moved to Al-Ittihad in the Saudi Women's Premier League But in January 2025, she decided to leave the team.

In January 2025, Kaaki returned to the Saudi Women's First Division League with Jeddah, before moving to Al-Hmmah in July 2025.

== International career ==
On December 5, 2023, Kaaki joined the first roster of the newly founded Saudi Arabia u-20 women's national football team with Scottish coach Pauline Hamill
