= Rona Aizouk =

Syrian footballer (born 1999)

Personal information
- Date of birth: 30 June 1999 (age 27)
- Place of birth: Syria
- Position: Forward

Senior career*
Years	Team	Apps	(Gls)
- Al-Wahda SC
–2023	Fayrouzah Club		
2023–	Najmat Jeddah FC		

International career
	Syria	4	(1)
- * Club domestic league appearances and goals

Rona Aizouk (Arabic: رونا عيزوق; born 30 June 1999) is a Syrian professional footballer who plays as a forward for Najmat Jeddah FC.

== Early life ==
Aizouk was born on 30 June 1999. Growing up, she studied architecture.

== Club career ==
Aizouk played for Syrian side Al-Wahda SC, helping the club achieve second place in the league. Following her stint there, she signed for Syrian side Fayrouzah Club, helping the club win the league title.

Subsequently, she signed for Saudi Arabian side Najmat Jeddah FC, becoming the first Syrian women's player to sign for a professional side. Arabic news website Kooora wrote in 2024 that she "became one of the mainstays of the team aspiring to qualify for the Saudi Women’s Premier League" while playing for the club.
