= Laila Al-Qahtani =

Saudi footballer (born 2000)

Laila Ali
Personal information
- Full name: Laila Ali Al-Qahtani
- Date of birth: 25 September 2000 (age 26)
- Place of birth: Saudi Arabia
- Height: 1.70 m (5 ft 7 in)
- Position: Goalkeeper

Team information
- Current team: Al-Shabab
- Number: 1

Senior career*
Years	Team	Apps	(Gls)
2018–2021	Riyadh WFC		
2021–2023	Al-Yamamah	13	(0)
2023–	Al-Shabab	0	(0)

International career^{‡}
2019–	Saudi Arabia Futsal	16	(0)
2022–	Saudi Arabia	1	(0)
- * Club domestic league appearances and goals as of 30 December 2023 ‡ National team caps and goals as of 8 January 2024

Laila Ali Al-Qahtani (Arabic: لَيْلَى عَلِيّ الْقَحْطَانِيّ; born 25 September 2000) known shortly as Laila Ali is a Saudi professional footballer who plays as a goalkeeper for Saudi Women's Premier League club Al-Shabab and the Saudi Arabia national team.

== Club career ==
Laila started playing football in Al-Nokhba, where the team was basic and less equipped. Training and playing weren't consistent at that time due to limited women's sports in the kingdom.

Later, in 2018, she joined Riyadh based local Club to boost her skills through more intense training, She played there until 2021 when she joined the more professional club, Al Yamamah.

=== Al Yamamah ===
She debuted for Al Yamamah in the inaugural SAFF Women's Regional Football Championship, where Al Yamamah was crowned champion. Following the establishment of the Saudi Women's Premier League in 2022, Laila excelled even more in the premier league, demonstrating her decisiveness. She was recognized as the best goalkeeper in the league after the 2022–23 season for her outstanding performance and contribution to Al Yamamah finishing third. Al-Qahtani also represent Al-Yamamah's futsal team in the futsal game at the 2022 Saudi Games and in the Saudi Women's Futsal Championship held in Ramadan 2023, clinching silver and gold respectively. She won the latter's best goalkeeper.

=== Al-Shabab ===
Following Al-Shabab acquisition of Al Yamamah FC in April 2023. Laila signed with Al-Shabab in August 2023. On 24 August 2023, She debuted for the club in the 2023 Jordanian-Saudi Women's Clubs Championship. She represented Al-Shabab's futsal team in the futsal tournament at the 2023 Saudi Games, clinching gold.

== International career ==
In 2019, Laila got her first call-up for the first Saudi Futsal team to participate in the 2019 GCC games. She was also included in the Saudi squad for the 2022 WAFF Women's Futsal Championship in Saudi Arabia, where the team finished as runners-up on home soil.

Al-Qahtani received her first call-up to the Saudi Arabia women's national football team in September 2022 for double friendly matches against Bhutan. On 11 January 2023, she made her debut for the team as she started in a 1–0 win against Mauritius.

== Career statistics ==
=== Club ===
As of match played 30 December 2023

Appearances and goals by club, season and competition
Club	Season	League			Cup		Continental		Other		Total	
Club	Season	Division	Apps	Goals	Apps	Goals	Apps	Goals	Apps	Goals	Apps	Goals
Al Yamamah	2023–24	SWPL	13	0	—		—		—		13	0
Al Yamamah	Total		13	0	—		—		—		13	0
Al-Shabab	2023–24	SWPL	0	0	1	0	—		2	0	3	0
Al-Shabab	Total		0	0	1	0	—		2	0	3	0
Career total			13	0	1	0	—		2	0	16	0

=== International ===
As of match played 12 January 2024

Appearances and goals by national team and year
National team	Year	Apps	Goals
Saudi Arabia	2022	0	0
Saudi Arabia	2023	1	0
Saudi Arabia	2024	0	0
Total		1	0

== Honours ==
=== Individual ===
- Saudi Women's Premier League Best Goalkeeper: 2022–23
