= Haya Khalil =

Jordanian footballer

Personal information
- Full name: Haya Marwan Ahmad Khalil
- Date of birth: 12 September 1994 (age 32)
- Place of birth: Amman, Jordan
- Position: Defender

Senior career*
Years	Team	Apps	(Gls)
–2023	Al-Nassr (Amman)		
2023–	Al-Taqadom		

International career^{‡}
2017–	Jordan	12	(0)
- * Club domestic league appearances and goals ‡ National team caps and goals as of 15 January 2019

Haya Marwan Ahmad Khalil (Arabic: هيا خليل; born 12 September 1994) is a Jordanian footballer who plays as a defender for the Jordan women's national team.
