= Rahaf Al-Mansouri =

Saudi footballer (born 1997)

Personal information
- Full name: Rahaf nasser Al-Mansouri
- Date of birth: 25 April 1997 (age 29)
- Place of birth: Saudi Arabia
- Position: Midfielder

Team information
- Current team: Al Qadsiah FC
- Number: 8

Senior career*
| Years | Team | Apps | (Gls) |
| 2022–2023 | Eastern Flames FC | | |
| 2023–2024 | Al-Ahli | | |
| 2024– | Al Qadsiah FC | | |
- * Club domestic league appearances and goals

Rahaf Adel Al-Mansouri (Arabic: رهف عادل المنصوري; born 25 April 1997) is a Saudi footballer who plays as a midfielder for Saudi Women's Premier League club Al Qadsiah FC.

== Club career ==
Al-Mansouri played with Eastern Flames FC in the 2023/24 season of the Saudi Women's Premier League.

In the following season 2023–24 she moved to Al-Ahli to play as a starter in all the team's matches with Jordanian coach Manar Fraij.

In July 2024, Al-Mansouri moved to Al Qadsiah FC, where she won second place and the silver medal in the 2024–25 Saudi Women's Cup, as well as third place and the bronze medal in the 2024–25 Saudi Women's Premier League.

== Honours ==
=== Club ===
Al-Ahli

- Saudi Women's Premier League:

(silver) second place: 2023–24

- SAFF Women's Cup:

(gold) Champion: 2023–24

Al Qadsiah

- Saudi Women's Premier League:

(bronze) Third place: 2024–25 Saudi Women's Premier League

- SAFF Women's Cup:

(silver) second place: 2024–25 Saudi Women's Cup
