= Saudi Women's Second Division League =

Third-tier women's football league in Saudi Arabia

Saudi Women's Second Division League دوري الدرجة الثانية للسيدات السعودي
- Organising body: Saudi Arabian Football Federation
- Founded: 3 October 2024; 23 months ago
- Country: Saudi Arabia
- Confederation: AFC
- Number of clubs: 25
- Level on pyramid: 3
- Promotion to: Saudi Women's First Division League
- Current champions: Najmat Jeddah (1st title) (2024–25)
- Website: saff.com.sa
- Current: 2024–25 Saudi Women's Second Division League

The Saudi Women's Second Division League, officially the SAFF Women's Second Division League, is the third-tier Saudi women's football league in the Saudi football league system, below the Saudi Women's First Division League.

== History and format ==
In November 2023, the board of directors of the Saudi Arabian Football Federation approved the establishment of the Women's Second Division League, in response to the continued growth of women's football in the country.

In January 2024, the federation finalized the format for the Women's Second Division League. The competition consists of two phases: a regional group stage played in a home-and-away format, followed by a centralized final stage. The top teams from each group advance, with the champion and runner-up earning promotion to the First Division. Two teams will be relegated from the First Division to accommodate this promotion.

In October 2024, it was announced that 25 teams would participate in the inaugural edition. The group stage will be held in a regionally centralized format, with teams playing a double round-robin (home and away). Eight teams will qualify for the final stage: the top five group winners and the three best second-placed teams.

The final stage will be played in a centralized format, beginning with the quarter-finals in a single-elimination format. The teams that finish first and second in the final round will be promoted to the First Division for the following season.

== Current teams ==
The following 25 teams participate in the inaugural edition.

Qasim group
Team	Location
Al-Raed	Buraidah
Al-Mahmal	Thadig
Golden Eagles	Riyadh
Arar	Arar
Artawi	Riyadh
Al-Qwarah	Riyadh

Jeddah group
Team	Location
Saham	Jeddah
Mawahib Jeddah	Jeddah
Najmt Jeddah	Jeddah
Al-Nors	Jeddah
Al-Jawad	Jeddah
Manjam Al-Mawahib	Jeddah

Al-Ahsa group
Team	Location
Al-Fateh	Al-Mubarraz
Flaij	Hafar Al Batin
Al-Khobar	Khobar
Al-Adalah	Al-Ahsa
Al-Nahda	Dammam

Medina group
Team	Location
Al-Orobah	Sakakah
Khaybar	Khaybar
Al-Watani	Tabuk
Shabab Taibah	Medina

Al-Bahah group
Team	Location
Hetten	Samtah
Al-Hejaz	Baljurashi
Al-Ain	Al-Bahah
Al-armouk	Jazan

== Champions ==
Season	Winners	Runners-up	Third place	Ref
2024–25	Najmat Jeddah	Al-Nahda	Al-Yarmouk	
2025–26	Al-Shams	Al-Qunfidah	Al-Hejaz	

== Awards ==
Season	Best Player	Top Goalscorer		Best Goalkeeper
2024–25	(Ethiopia) Netsanet Muluneh (Najmat Jeddah)	(Nigeria) Yetunde Balogun (Najmat Jeddah)	37 goals	(Chad) Amna Saleh (Najmat Jeddah)
2025–26	(Algeria) Kaouter Meghelli (Al-Qunfidah)	(The Gambia) Haddy Wally (Al-Shams)	17 goals	(Tunisia) Meriem Sassi (Al-Shams)

== See also ==
- Madaris League
- Saudi Women's Cup
- Saudi Women's Super Cup
- Women's association football
- Saudi Women's Premier League
- Women's football in Saudi Arabia
- Saudi Women's First Division League
- Saudi Women's Premier Challenge Cup
- Saudi Girls' youth football competitions
