= Mariam Sidibé (footballer) =

Ivorian footballer (born 1990)

Personal information
- Date of birth: 1 January 1999 (age 27)
- Place of birth: Abidjan, Ivory Coast
- Position: Midfielder

Team information
- Current team: Al-Yarmouk

Senior career*
Years	Team	Apps	(Gls)
- Bandama FC
- Juventus Yopougon
2020–2021	Club Sportif Atlas 05		
2021–2023	SCC Mohammédia	24	(10)
2023–2024	Inter	21	(17)
2024–2025	Al-Amal	7	(1)
2025	Al-Yarmouk	8	(7)

International career^{‡}
2019–	Ivory Coast	3	(0)
- * Club domestic league appearances and goals ‡ National team caps and goals as of 26 September 2023

Mariam Sidibé (born 1 January 1999) is an Ivorian professional footballer who plays as a Midfielder for Saudi Women's First Division League club Al-Yarmouk and the Ivory Coast national team.

== Club career ==
In September 2021, Sidibé signed for SCC Mohammédia in the Moroccan Women's Championship.

On 12 August 2024, Al-Amal announced the signing of Sidibé ahead of their debut in the Saudi Women's Premier League. On 27 September 2024, she made the starting lineup for Al-Amal in a 2–6 defeat against Al-Ahli, scoring the team's first goal in the Premier League.

== International career ==
In June 2022, Sidibé received a call-up to the Senior national team for a friendly match against Morocco. She made her debut on 23 June 2022 in a goalless draw.

She was recalled for the first-round matches of the 2024 Women's Africa Cup of Nations qualifiers against Tanzania, where the team was eliminated in a penalty shootout, missing out on qualification.
