= Houria Affak =

Algerian international footballer (born 1988)

Personal information
- Date of birth: 11 July 1988 (age 38)
- Place of birth: Algeria
- Position: Forward

Team information
- Current team: Phoenix

Senior career*
| Years | Team | Apps | (Gls) |
- Afak Relizane
| 2024– | Phoenix | | |

International career
- Algeria
- * Club domestic league appearances and goals

Houria Affak (born 11 July 1988) is an Algerian footballer who plays as a forward who plays for Saudi club Phoenix.

== International career ==
Affak scored in Algeria's 1–0 win against Ghana at the 2014 African Women's Championship.
