= Hajar Al-Ansari =

Bahraini sportswoman

Personal information
- Full name: Hajar Abdulrahman Al-Ansari
- Date of birth: 11 October 1992 (age 34)
- Place of birth: Bahrain
- Position: Forward

Team information
- Current team: Al-Taraji
- Number: 17

Senior career*
Years	Team	Apps	(Gls)
2021–2022	Al-Mamlaka		
2022–2023	Al Mutahed	9	
2023–	Al-Taraji	12	(17)

International career^{‡}
2019–	Bahrain Futsal	19	(1)
- * Club domestic league appearances and goals as of 14 March 2024 ‡ National team caps and goals as of 9 September 2023

Hajar Abdulrahman Al-Ansari (Arabic: هاجر عبد الرحمن الأنصاري; born 11 October 1992) is a Bahraini professional footballer who plays as a forward or midfielder for Saudi Women's Premier League club Al-Taraji. She is also a member of the Bahrain women's national volleyball team and the Bahrain women's national futsal team.

== Club career ==
=== Al-Mamlaka ===
Al-Ansari played for Al-Mamlaka in the inaugural SAFF Women's Regional Championship during the 2021–22 season, leading the club to win the first-ever title in Saudi women's football.

=== Al Mutahed ===
In November 2022, Al-Ansari joined Al Mutahed for the inaugural season of the Saudi Women's First Division League. She played a key role in the team's progress to the final, which paved the way for their promotion later on.

=== Al-Taraji ===
Following Al-Taraji's acquisition of Oasis Club, Al-Ansari joined Al-Taraji for the 2023–24 Saudi Women's First Division League. She made her debut on November 9, 2023, in a historic 23–0 victory over Ras Al Tanura, where she also scored her first goal for the club. Al-Ansari played a key role in the team's performance, helping them qualify for the finals and eventually the semi-finals, where she scored the decisive goal to secure the club's first-ever promotion to the Premier League. Over the season, she netted 17 goals. in June 2024, Al-Taraji extended Al-Ansari's contract for another season.

=== Invitinal tournaments ===
In February 2024, she competed with the Bahrain Super Soccer Academy in the Gulf Women's International Tournament in Doha, Qatar, which they won. she finished as the top scorer.

== Other sports career ==
=== Futsal ===
In 2017, Al-Ansari played in the Bahraini women's futsal league with Al-Israr club.

=== Volleyball ===
In 2018, Al-Ansari played for Al Wasl in the Arab women's sports teams championship in the United Arab Emirates.

In 2019, she represented the Al-Ahli volleyball team in the 5th edition of the Arab Women's Club Games.

== International career ==
=== Futsal ===
Al-Ansari has represented Bahrain's futsal team since 2019, winning gold at the GCC Games in 2022. She was also part of the final squad for the 2022 WAFF Women's Futsal Championship, where the team secured a bronze medal.

=== Volleyball ===
Al-Ansari has been capped for the national volleyball team in several events, including the 2019 GCC Gulf Games in Kuwait, where she was named best player.
