= Dhekra Mahfoudh =

Tunisian footballer (born 1992)

Dhikra Mahfoudh
Personal information
- Date of birth: 23 May 1992 (age 34)
- Position: Right back

Team information
- Current team: Al-Taraji

Senior career*
Years	Team	Apps	(Gls)
–2022	Sbeiba Women's Association		
2022–2023	AS Banque de l'Habitat		
2023–	Al-Taraji		

International career
- Tunisia
- * Club domestic league appearances and goals

Dhikra Mahfoudh (Arabic: ذكرى محفوظ; born 23 May 1992) is a Tunisian footballer who plays as a right back for Saudi club Al-Taraji and the Tunisia women's national team.

== Club career ==
Mahfoudh played for Sbeiba Women's Association and AS Banque de l'Habitat in Tunisia.

== International career ==
Mahfoudh has capped for Tunisia at senior level, including in a 2–1 friendly away win over Jordan on 10 June 2021.

== See also ==
- List of Tunisia women's international footballers
