= Al-Taqadom FC (women) =

Al-Taqadom FC Women
- Full name: Al-Taqadom Football Club Women
- Nickname: Al Bortoqali (The Orange)
- Founded: 2023; 2 years ago
- Ground: Prince Mohammed Bin Abdulaziz Stadium
- League: Saudi Women's First Division League
- 2023–24: SWFDL, 4th of 26
Home colours	Away colours	Third colours

Al-Taqadom Football Club Women, shortly known as Al-Taqadom, is a Saudi professional women's football club that plays in the Saudi Women's First Division League.

== History ==
Founded in July 2023 in Al-Qassim Province by Anan Al-Mehana as an independent club, the club encountered challenges obtaining a team license after the legal registration period for the league set by the Saudi Football Federation had ended. Consequently, they sought collaboration with Al-Taqadom FC, a team registered in the Saudi First Division League. Al-Taqadom agreed to acquire the team, permitting their participation under the name of Al-Taqadom Club in the inaugural season of the Saudi Women's First Division League. Immediately upon its official establishment, the club commenced the process of signing foreign players, as they signed Lebanese Nancy Tchaylian and Jordanian Haya Khalil.

On 9 February 2024, The club secured a spot in the knockout stage of the Saudi Women's First Division League by finishing second in their group. which confirmed that they won't face relegation in the 24/25 season. The team advanced to the semi-finals after topping Group B with two wins. However, in the semi-final match against Al-Taraji, they fell short with a 1–0 defeat. In the subsequent match for third place, they lost 1–3 to Al-Amal, resulting in them remaining in the first division.

== Current squad ==
As of 10 February 2024

Note: Flags indicate national team as defined under FIFA eligibility rules; some limited exceptions apply. Players may hold more than one non-FIFA nationality.

No.	Pos.	Nation	Player
2		KSA	Lama Amine
4	DF	JOR	Haya Khalil
6		KSA	Taghrid Mubarak
9		KSA	Sheikha Al-Qaisi
12		KSA	Anan Al-Mehana
13		KSA	Yasmeen Al-Alfi
14		EGY	Salwa Elmitwalli

No.	Pos.	Nation	Player
17		KSA	Zahra Al-Qadi
20		KSA	Najlaa Jahlan
21		TUN	Ashwak Farhat
27		KSA	Shahad Mohammed
30		KSA	Teaf Fawaz
80		LBN	Lina Iskandar
