= Women's football in Saudi Arabia =

Women's football in Saudi Arabia كرة قدم السيدات في المملكة العربية السعودية
- Country: Saudi Arabia
- Governing body: Saudi Arabian Football Federation (SAFF)
- National teams: Senior National Football Team; National Football Team U-20; National Football Team U-17

Saudi women’s football comprises several leagues and cup competitions. The top division is the Premier League, followed by the First Division and the Second Division. Major cup tournaments include the Super Cup and the Women's Cup.

There are also multiple Saudi Girls' youth football competitions aimed at developing young players. Collectively, these leagues and competitions form the structure of women’s football in Saudi Arabia.

The country is represented internationally by the senior national team, while the under-20 and under-17 teams focus on youth development and talent progression.

== History ==
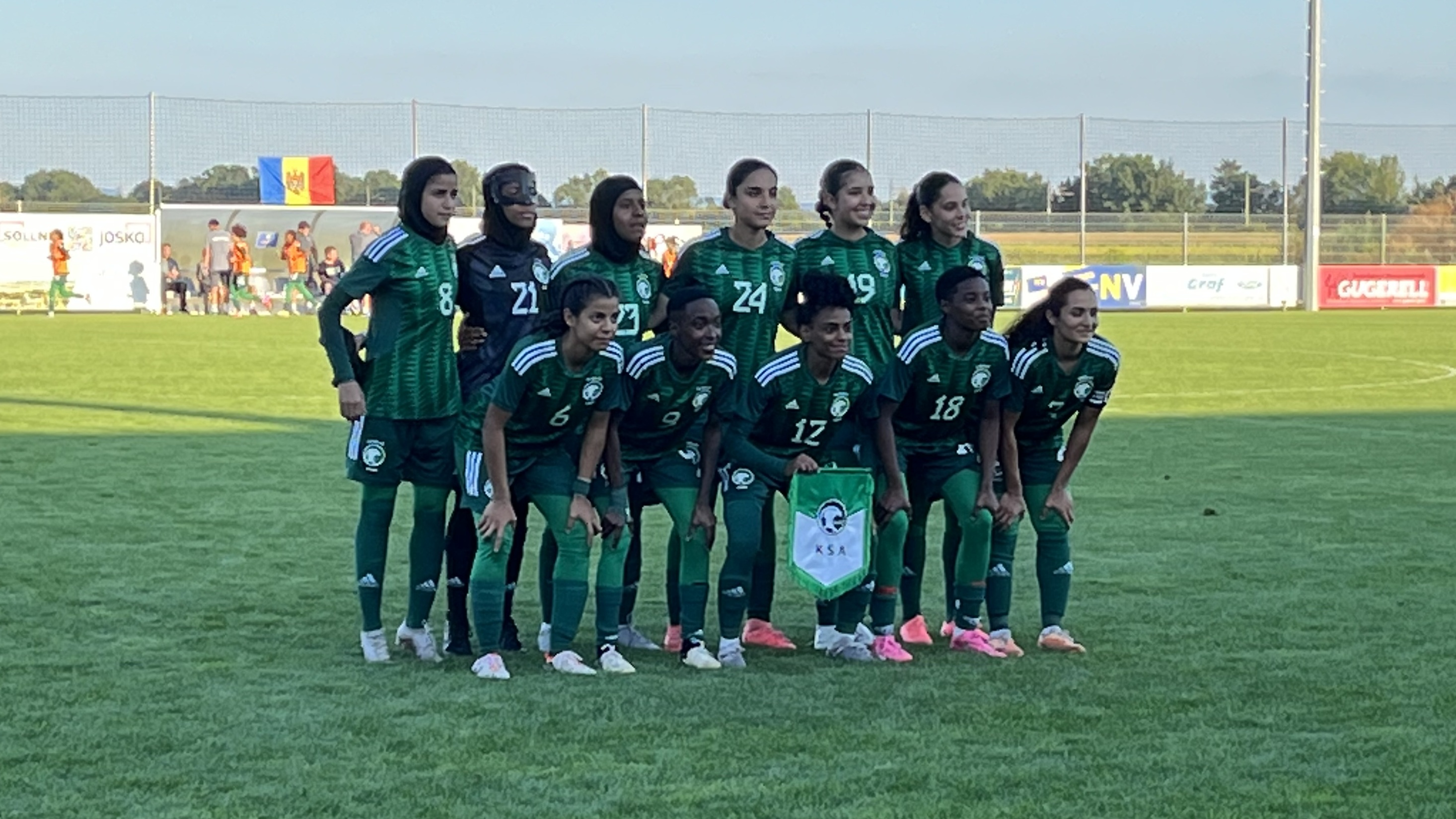
Saudi Arabia women's national football team against Moldova in Kirchberg am Wagram, Austria (2024)

Women's football in Saudi Arabia has developed gradually over several decades. The Saudi Arabian Football Federation (SAFF) was established in 1956 and joined FIFA the same year, initially overseeing men’s football while providing the institutional framework that later enabled the sport’s expansion.

Organised women’s football began to emerge in the mid-2000s. In 2006, King's United was founded in Jeddah as the first known women’s football club in the country. That same year, Eastern Flames FC formed as a recreational team through Saudi Aramco, contributing to early competitive development.

In January 2008, the first recorded women’s football match in Saudi Arabia took place at Prince Mohamed bin Fahd Stadium in Dammam. Later that year, a multi-team tournament was held and won by King's United, highlighting growing participation in cities such as Riyadh, Jeddah, and Dammam.

During the late 2000s and early 2010s, women’s clubs trained privately and adapted to local cultural norms. Charity matches and university-based competitions increased participation and visibility. At the same time, women’s football was increasingly discussed in relation to health and social development.

From the mid-2010s, institutional support expanded. Women were gradually permitted to attend football matches as spectators, marking a significant policy shift.

A major turning point came in the early 2020s. In 2022, the Saudi women’s national football team played its first official international match, defeating the Seychelles 2–0. The same year, the SAFF launched the Saudi Women's Premier League and the Saudi Women's First Division League, establishing a formal domestic football pyramid.

In 2024, this structure was further expanded with the introduction of the Saudi Women's Second Division League and the Saudi Women's Super Cup, providing additional competitive pathways. Youth tournaments for girls were also introduced to support grassroots participation and long-term player development.

In late 2025, the SAFF launched the Saudi Women’s Premier Challenge Cup, a winter cup competition featuring a format similar to that of the Saudi Women's Premier League.

== Leagues ==
Level	League(s)/Division(s)				
1	Saudi Women's Premier League; 8 clubs				
2	Saudi Women's First Division League; 8 clubs				
3	Saudi Women's Second Division League; 25 clubs divided into 5 groups				
3	Group 1; 6 clubs	Group 2; 5 clubs	Group 3; 4 clubs	Group 4; 4 clubs	Group 5; 6 clubs

== Cups ==
- Saudi Women's Cup – The primary national knockout cup competition.
- Saudi Women's Super Cup – Contested between the winners and runners-up of the league and the Saudi Women's Cup.
- Saudi Women’s Premier Challenge Cup – A winter cup competition featuring a format similar to that of the league.

== See also ==
- Saudi football league system
- Saudi Girls' youth football competitions
- Saudi Arabia women's national football team
