= Saudi Women's Super Cup =

Annual women's football super cup competition in Saudi Arabia

Saudi Women's Super Cup كأس السوبر السعودي للسيدات
- Organiser(s): Saudi Arabian Football Federation
- Founded: 3 November 2024; 22 months ago
- Region: Saudi Arabia
- Teams: 4
- Current champions: Al-Nassr (1st title)
- Most championships: Al-Nassr (1 title)
- Broadcasters: List of broadcasters
- Website: Saudi Women's Super Cup
- 2026 Saudi Women's Super Cup

The Saudi Women's Super Cup is a super cup competition in Saudi women's football, contested by the winners and runners-up of the Saudi Women's Premier League and the Saudi Women's Cup.

== History ==
On 3 November 2024, the Saudi Arabian Football Federation announced the introduction of the Saudi Women's Super Cup, with the aim of enhancing the level of competition in women's football and delivering high-quality matches. The inaugural edition, the 2025 Saudi Women's Super Cup, was held between 4 and 8 September 2025. Al-Nassr won the first title after defeating Al-Ahli 2–0 in the final.

== Format ==
The competition is held in a centralized format, where four teams will compete in three matches (two semi-finals and a final).

The four teams consist of:

- The champion of the Saudi Women's Premier League
- The runner-up of the Premier League
- The champion of the Saudi Women's Cup
- The runner-up of the Cup

If a team qualifies through both competitions, the vacant spot will be filled by the next highest-ranked team in the Premier League standings that has not already qualified. In the case of no overlap, the semi-final matchups are predetermined; if there is an overlap, the pairings will be decided by draw.

== Finals by year ==
Season	Host venue	Winners	Score	Runners-up	Losing Semi-finalists
2025	SHG Arena, Riyadh	Al-Nassr	2–0	Al-Ahli	Al-Qadsiah and Al-Ula
2026	King Fahd Sports City Stadium, Taif	Al-Nassr	4–1	Al-Hilal	Al-Ahli and Al-Ittihad

== Broadcasters ==
Region	Broadcaster	Period	Ref.
Saudi Arabia & Middle East and North Africa	SSC	2025	
Saudi Arabia & Middle East and North Africa	MBC Action	2026–present	
Saudi Arabia & Middle East and North Africa	MBC Shahid (streaming)	2025–present	

== See also ==
- Madaris League
- Saudi Women's Cup
- Women's association football
- Saudi Women's Premier League
- Women's football in Saudi Arabia
- Saudi Women's First Division League
- Saudi Women's Premier Challenge Cup
- Saudi Girls' youth football competitions
- Saudi Women's Second Division League
