= Archbishop Njenga Girls High School =

Location
- Lugari Constituency; Kakamega County; Kenya; 0.629°N 34.883°E

Information
- Type: Public secondary school
- Motto: Archbishop Njenga Girls High School for Progress
- Religious affiliation: Roman Catholicism
- Established: 1971; 55 years ago
- Founder: Bishop Njenga
- Oversight: Diocese of Kakamega
- Staff: 63
- Grades: 9-12
- Gender: Girls
- Enrollment: 691
- Color: Blue

Archbishop Njenga Girls High School is a Roman Catholic secondary school for girls located in Lugari District, Kakamega County, Kenya.

== History ==
The School was started by Chekalini Parents Harambee Group, on 8 February 1971 as Chekalini Secondary School, a mixed school with initial enrolment of 17 students (9 boys and 8 girls).

In June, 1972 it changed its name to Bishop Njenga girls’ high school, named after Rt. Rev. Bishop John Njenga, on acceptance to be the sponsor under the Catholic Diocese of Eldoret. Boys were then moved to other catholic boys’ schools around. In 1978, A level classes were started offering Arts based subjects. The enrolment had grown to about 500 students. In 1988, the school became a public girls’ boarding school but still under the Catholic sponsorship, which changed the Diocese of Eldoret to the Catholic Diocese of Kakamega. The school then grew through the ranks from a one streamed district school to the current five streamed Extra County School. The school occupies 26 acres of land where, the main school sits on 13 acres and the rest is used for farming. The school is ICT compliant with most of the departmental operations computerized and inter networked with each other and it has an operational website.

Archbishop Njenga girls has participated in girls soccer since 2002 when they won bronze medals at National competitions and emerged winners in the East and Central Africa Championships. Besides sports, the school is known in Music with more than ten years of performance in percussion band at the national level, Kenya Music Festivals.

== See also ==
- Education in Kenya
- Religions in Kenya
