= Ibtissem Ben Mohamed =

Tunisian footballer (born 1997)

Personal information
- Date of birth: 1 July 1997 (age 29)
- Position: Defender

Team information
- Current team: Al Wehda

Senior career*
Years	Team	Apps	(Gls)
- AS féminine du Sahel
- Tunis Air Club
–2022	AS Banque de l'Habitat		
2022–2023	Jeddah Pride		
2023–	Al Wehda		

International career
- Tunisia
- * Club domestic league appearances and goals

Ibtissem Ben Mohamed (Arabic: ابتسام بن محمد, born 1 July 1997) is a Tunisian footballer who plays as a defender for Saudi club Al Wehda and the Tunisia women's national team.

== Club career ==
Ben Mohamed played for AS féminine du Sahel, Tunis Air Club and AS Banque de l'Habitat in Tunisia. She later joined Jeddah Pride and Al Wehda in Saudi Arabia.

== International career ==
Ben Mohamed has capped for Tunisia at senior level, including a 4–0 friendly away win over the United Arab Emirates 6 October 2021.

== See also ==
- List of Tunisia women's international footballers
