= Selma Kapetanović =

Bosnian footballer

Personal information
- Date of birth: 9 December 1996 (age 29)
- Place of birth: Schwäbisch Gmünd, Germany
- Height: 1.62 m (5 ft 4 in)
- Position: Midfielder

Team information
- Current team: Al-Ula

Senior career*
Years	Team	Apps	(Gls)
2012–2019	SFK 2000		
2019–2020	Ferencváros		
2020–2021	SFK 2000		
2021–2022	FC Minsk	11	(2)
2022–2023	ŽNK Split		
2023–	Al-Ula	5	(0)

International career^{‡}
2011–2012	Bosnia and Herzegovina U17	6	(3)
2016–	Bosnia and Herzegovina	19	(1)
- * Club domestic league appearances and goals as of 19:28, 30 August 2019 (UTC) ‡ National team caps and goals as of 19:28, 30 August 2019 (UTC)

Selma Kapetanović (born 9 December 1996) is a Bosnian footballer who plays as a midfielder for Saudi club Al-Ula and has appeared for the Bosnia and Herzegovina women's national team.

== Club career ==
Kapetanović started her career at SFK 2000, before playing a season at Ferencváros in Hungary, then returning to her parent club. She later joined FC Minsk in Belarus, ŽNK Split in Croatia. In September 2023, she signed for Saudi club Al-Ula.

== International career ==
Kapetanović has been capped for the Bosnia and Herzegovina national team, appearing for the team during the 2019 FIFA Women's World Cup qualifying cycle.

=== International goals ===
#	Date	Venue	Opponent	Score	Result	Competition
1.	26 June 2022	Terme Čatež, Brežice, Slovenia	Philippines	1–0	1–2	Friendly
2.	18 April 2026	Rheinpark Stadion, Vaduz, Liechtenstein	Liechtenstein	2–0	6–0	2027 FIFA Women's World Cup qualification

== Honours ==
- Saudi Women's First Division League: 2023–24

Individual

- Saudi Women's First Division League Best Player: 2023–24
