= Jolina Amani =

Cape Verdean footballer (born 1999)

Personal information
- Date of birth: 26 August 1999 (age 27)
- Place of birth: Rotterdam, Netherlands
- Height: 1.73 m (5 ft 8 in)
- Position: Forward

Team information
- Current team: Eastern Flames
- Number: 10

Youth career
- Excelsior

Senior career*
Years	Team	Apps	(Gls)
2017–2020	Excelsior	46	(4)
2020–2021	Benfica	17	(8)
2021–2022	ADO Den Haag	11	(6)
2022–2024	Braga	23	(4)
2024–	Eastern Flames	6	(0)

International career^{‡}
2018	Netherlands U19	2	(0)
2025–	Cape Verde	1	(0)
- * Club domestic league appearances and goals as of 21 November 2024 ‡ National team caps and goals as of 26 February 2025

Jolina Amani (born 26 August 1999) is a footballer who plays as a forward for Saudi Women's Premier League club Eastern Flames. Born in the Netherlands, she plays for the Cape Verde national team.

== Club career ==
=== Excelsior ===
Amani made her league debut against Achilles '29 on 8 September 2017. She scored her first league goal against Alkmaar on 16 March 2018, scoring in the 31st minute.

=== Benfica ===
Amani was announced at Benfica on 17 August 2020.

=== ADO Den Haag ===
Amani was announced at ADO Den Haag on 5 September 2021. She made her league debut against Alkmaar on 3 September 2021. Amani scored her first league goal against Excelsior on 10 October 2021, scoring in the 62nd minute. She left ADO Den Haag in 2022.

== International career ==
Born in the Netherlands, Amani is of DR Congolese and Cape Verdean through her father and mother, respectively.

Amani was called up to the Netherlands U19s training camp in 2018, becoming the first player from Excelsior Barendrecht to be selected for a national team. She made her U19 debut against Italy U19s on 18 July 2018.

In September 2023, Amani was called up to the Cape Verde women's national team.

On 19 February 2025, Amani's request to switch allegiance to Cape Verde was approved by FIFA. Six days later, she made her debut with the national team in a 4–1 home win over Guinea.

== Personal life ==
Amani was born in Rotterdam.
