= Al Bayraq FC =

Estonian football club

Al-Bayraq FC
- Full name: Al Bayraq Football Club
- Founded: 2015; 11 years ago
- Ground: Irqah Sports Stadium, Riyadh
- Manager: Abdullah Al-Kaltham
- League: Saudi Women's First Division League
- 2023–24: SWFDL, Group A: 4th of 6
- Website: albayraqclub.sa
Home colours	Away colours

Al-Bayraq Football Club (Arabic: نادي البيرق), formerly known as Sama, is a Saudi professional women's football club based in Riyadh that competes in the Saudi Women's First Division League.

The team played in the inaugural Saudi Women's Premier League but faced relegation.

== History ==
=== Hanul: (2015–2021) ===
Established in 2015 as a community team under the name Hanel, the squad entered the women's first football league at the Kingdom Al-Riyadh Women's League in 2018, achieving a 3rd-place finish. They returned for the 2019–20 edition, leading the league before it was canceled due to COVID-19. In 2020, they joined the newly launched Women's Community Football League, topping Riyadh group B alongside teams like Al Yamamah. Advancing to the knockout stage, the team narrowly lost 1–0 to Challenge FC.

=== Sama: (2021–2023) ===
Renamed as the Sama Women's Football Team in 2021, the squad entered the first SAFF Women's National Football Championship, securing a third-place finish in the central province group. Despite a promising start, Sama faced a setback in the knockout stage, losing 3–1 to Jeddah Eagles. Following the introduction of the Saudi Women's Premier League, Sama earned a spot in the league after reaching the 2022 final knockout stage. However, their journey in the premier league was challenging, marked by a tough debut loss of 18–0 to Al Nassr at home. Sama struggled throughout the season, losing all matches and conceding 174 goals, averaging 12.36 goals per match, leading to their relegation from the premier league.

=== Al Bayraq: (2023–present) ===
Former logo used from 2023 to 2024.

After being relegated to the Saudi Women's First Division League, the team underwent another name change in 2023 to become Al Bayraq Football Club. They participated in the inaugural 2023–24 SAFF Women's Cup, experiencing an early exit after losing 1–17 to Al Ahli in the quarter-final.

== Players ==
=== Current squad ===
As of 18 November 2023

Note: Flags indicate national team as defined under FIFA eligibility rules; some limited exceptions apply. Players may hold more than one non-FIFA nationality.

No.	Pos.	Nation	Player
—	GK	MAR	Bouchra Tatlalou
—	DF	KSA	Mongia Awaji
—	FW	ALG	Besma Benlekhlef
—			Salha
—			Fay
—			Sarah
—			Raghad
5		SYR	Myassar Al-Abassi
—			Renade

No.	Pos.	Nation	Player
—		KSA	Wafaa
—		EGY	Amal Heseen
—			Ruqaia
—			Najlaa
—			Nourah
—		KSA	Hessa
—			Sadeem
—			Asmaa
—			Joud
—			Amira
