= Al-Nors FC =

- Full name: Al-Nors Club
- Founded: 2022; 3 years ago
- Owner: Zahir Assiri
- League: Saudi Women's First Division League
- 2023–24: SWFDL, 17th of 26; League phase Group 5: 4th of 5

Al-Nors Club (Arabic: نادي النورس) is a women's football club based in Jeddah, Saudi Arabia. The team currently competes in the Saudi Women's First Division League, the second tier of Women's football in Saudi Arabia, since 2022 having been awarded a licence in its inaugural season.

== History ==
Al-Nors Club was established in February 2022 as a private sector club, after obtaining a (NAFES) license from the Ministry of Sports, which allows investors and companies to establish sports clubs and participate in official competitions in Saudi Arabia.

While owning a women's football team, Al-Nors Club established women's teams in basketball and volleyball in 2023.

In the 2022–23 season of the Saudi Women's First Division League, Al-Nors relied on 15 players under the age of 20 with the aim of giving the team experience in its first participation.

In the following season 2023–24 of the Saudi Women's First Division League, Al-Nors relied on Reem Qabbani from the Schools League known as Dawri Madaris and Elham Bakhsh from Pakistan.

== Players ==
=== Current squad ===
As of 14 December 2023

Note: Flags indicate national team as defined under FIFA eligibility rules; some limited exceptions apply. Players may hold more than one non-FIFA nationality.

No.	Pos.	Nation	Player
97	GK	(The Gambia) GAM	Aminata Gaye
5	DF	(The Gambia) GAM	Adel Mendy
33	DF	(Saudi Arabia) KSA	Shorouq Al-Lahiani
7	MF	(Saudi Arabia) KSA	Ghader Al-Shaikhi
98	DF	(Kenya) KEN	Myline Awuor
29	FW	(Nigeria) NGA	Yetunde Balogun
15	DF	(Saudi Arabia) KSA	Sama Al-Sobiani
22	FW	(Saudi Arabia) KSA	Sarah Bakari
9	FW	(Saudi Arabia) KSA	Rama Al-Juhani

No.	Pos.	Nation	Player
50	DF	(Pakistan) PAK	Elham Bakhsh
77	FW	(Saudi Arabia) KSA	Rania Farhan
12	DF	(Saudi Arabia) KSA	Nowaer Al-Muwalid
99	FW	(Saudi Arabia) KSA	Noreena Bin Madi
3	DF	(Saudi Arabia) KSA	Zain Marhomi
20	DF	(Saudi Arabia) KSA	Asma Hakami
24	FW	(Saudi Arabia) KSA	Dunia Khayat
6	DF	(Tunisia) TUN	Oumayma Ghedamsi
—	FW	(Saudi Arabia) KSA	Reem Qabbani
