= Wafe Messaoud =

Tunisian footballer (born 1994)

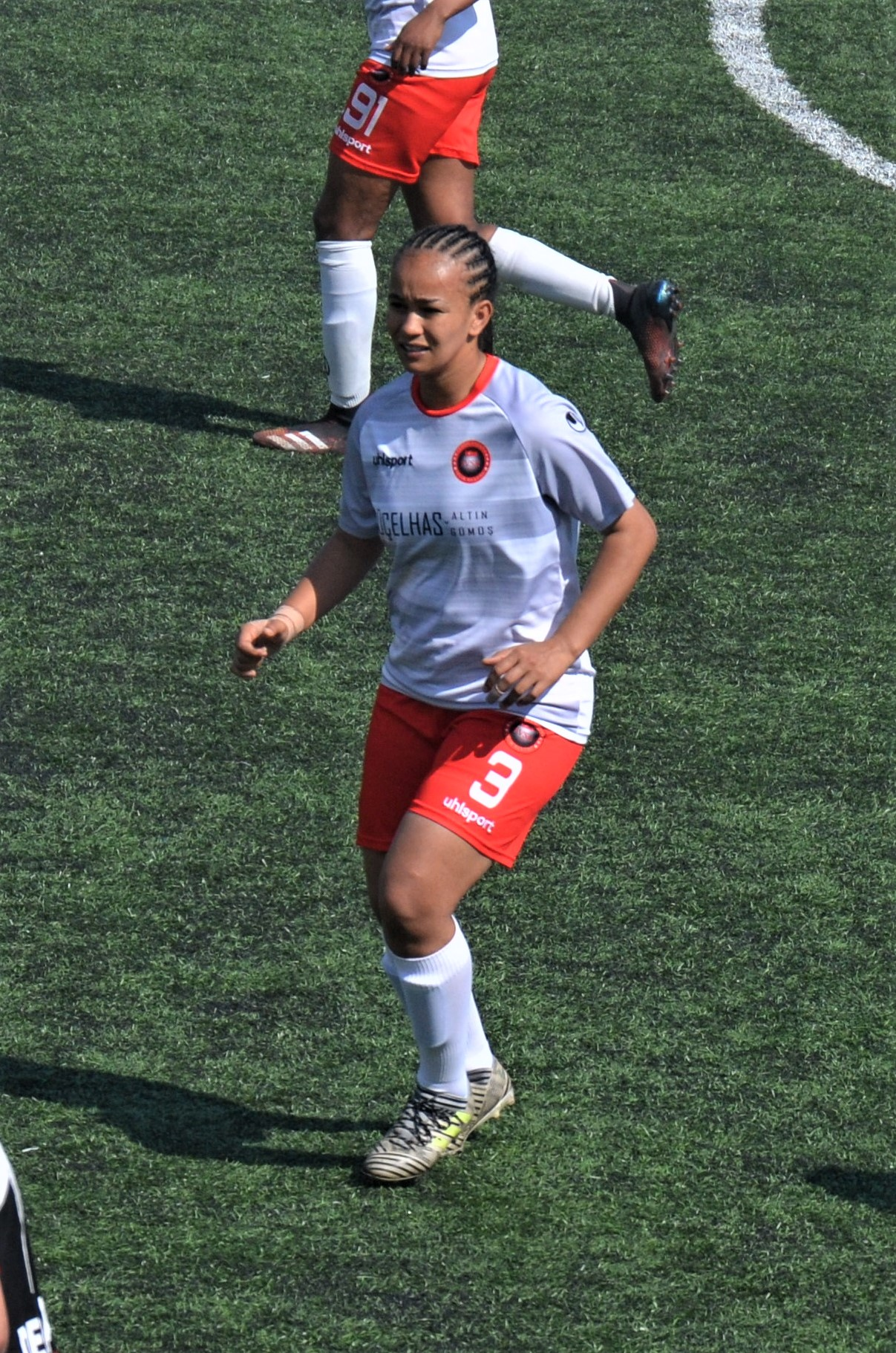
- Wafe Messaoudof Fatih Vatan Spor (May 2022)

Personal information
- Date of birth: 24 October 1994 (age 32)
- Position: Centre back

Team information
- Current team: Al-Taraji

Senior career*
Years	Team	Apps	(Gls)
–2021	Gafsa		
2021–2022	Fatih Vatan Spor	16	(0)
2022–2023	Kireçburnu Spor	10	(1)
2023	Bağcılar Evren Spor	5	(0)
2023–	Al-Taraji		

International career
- Tunisia
- * Club domestic league appearances and goals as of 5 February 2023

Wafe Messaoud (Arabic: وفاء مسعود; born 24 October 1994) is a Tunisian footballer, who plays as a centre back for Saudi club Al-Taraji and the Tunisia women's national team.

== Club career ==
Messaoud has played for Gafsa in Tunisia.

In December 2022, she moved to Turkey and joined Fatih Vatan Spor in Istanbul to play in the 2021–22 Women's Super League. She appeared in 16 matches of the 2021–22 season. The next season, she transferred to Kireçburnu Spor. In the second half of the 2022–23 season, she changed her club to Bağcılar Evren Spor in the Turkish first league. In 2023, she moved to the Saudi Women’s First Division League to play with Al-Taraji achieving the top scorer award with 36 goals and qualifying for the Saudi Women’s Premier League.

== International career ==
Messaoud has capped for Tunisia at senior level, including two friendly away wins over Jordan in June 2021.

=== International goals ===
Scores and results list Tunisia's goal tally first

No.	Date	Venue	Opponent	Score	Result	Competition	Ref.
1	27 August 2021	Police Academy Stadium, Cairo, Egypt	Sudan	1	12–1	2021 Arab Women's Cup	

== See also ==
- List of Tunisia women's international footballers
