= Najmat Jeddah FC =

Women's football club in Jeddah

Najmat Jeddah
- Full name: Najmat Jeddah Football Club
- Founded: 2022; 4 years ago
- League: Saudi Women's Second Division League
- 2024–25: SD2L, 1st of 22 (promoted)
- Website: www.najmat-jeddah.com
Home colours	Away colours

Najmat Jeddah Football Club (Arabic: نادي نجمة جدة), shortly known as Najmat Jeddah is a women's football club based in Jeddah that competes in the Saudi Women's Second Division League, the third tier of Saudi Women's Football.

== History ==
Established in 2022, Najmat Jeddah emerged amid the growing rise of women's football in Saudi Arabia. Right away, the team took part in the inaugural Saudi Women's First Division League, advancing straight to the semi-finals undefeated before finishing fourth after back-to-back defeats. In their second season, the team fell short in the group stage, finishing 3rd out of 5. That same season, they made their debut in the inaugural Saudi Women's Cup but were eliminated in the round of 16 following a 7–0 loss to Al Qadsiah. After reaching the quarter-finals in the inaugural Saudi Women's Futsal Tournament, they advanced to the final in their 2024 campaign but faced defeat against Al Shabab.

Following their relegation from the First Division in 2024, the team competed in the newly established Second Division, where they delivered a dominant campaign, winning every match and netting a total of 121 goals to become the league's first-ever champions.

== Honours ==
Football

- Saudi Women's Second Division League (1; record):
  - Champions: 2024–25

Futsal

- Saudi Women's Futsal Tournament:
  - Runners-up: 2024
