= Al-Shoulla FC (women) =

Al-Shoulla
- Full name: Al-Shoulla Football Club
- Founded: 2023; 3 years ago
- Ground: Al-Shoulla Club Stadium; Al Kharj, Saudi Arabia
- Capacity: 8,000
- League: Saudi Women's First Division League
- 2023–2024: SWD1L, 10th of 26; Regular season: 2nd of 6 Final stages: 3rd of 3
Home colours	Away colours	Third colours

Al-Shoulla Women's Football Club or simply known as Al-Shoulla Ladies (Arabic: سيدات الشعلة) is a professional women's football team based in Al Kharj that currently plays in Saudi Women's First Division League, the second tier of women's football in Saudi Arabia.

== History ==
Established in 2023, the club went on to sign a Jordanian-Tunisian staff to lead their team in the first season in the first division league. Infused with a Tunisian flavor, the club signed four Tunisian players and one Egyptian to finalize their foreign player list. Placed in the central region group. the team secured second place out of six, winning six of their matches. Their victories included impressive results of 17–0 against Al-Orobah and 18–0 and 20–0 against Al-Watani, which qualified them for the final stages. In the final stages, the team suffered two losses, which confirmed their retention in the league.

In 2024, the team introduced a futsal second that competed in the Women's Futsal Championship, finishing 5th overall.

== Players and Staff ==
As of March 3, 2024

=== Current squad ===
Note: Flags indicate national team as defined under FIFA eligibility rules; some limited exceptions apply. Players may hold more than one non-FIFA nationality.

No.	Pos.	Nation	Player
—	GK	TUN	Oumayma Charfi
—		KSA	Abeer
—		KSA	Lamya
—	DF	TUN	Abir Sassi
—	MF	EGY	Sherouk Sayed
—	MF	TUN	Chaima El Ayeb
—	FW	KSA	Manar
—	FW	TUN	Aya Jeddi
—		KSA	Nouf Abdullah

No.	Pos.	Nation	Player
—		KSA	Moudhi
—		KSA	
—	GK	KSA	
—		KSA	
—		KSA	
—		KSA	
—		KSA	
—		KSA	
—		KSA	

=== Staff ===
As of 8 March 2024

==== Coaching staff ====
Job title	Name
Head Coach	(Jordan) Enshirah Al-Hyasat
Assistant coach	(Tunisia) Salwa Touati
Head of Sports Science	
Head of Physiotherapy	
Sports Therapists	
Doctor	
