= Phoenix Saudi Club =

Saudi women's soccer team

Phoenix
- Full name: Phoenix Saudi Club
- Founded: 2022; 3 years ago
- League: Saudi Women's First Division League
- 2023–24: SW1DL, 6th of 26; Regular season: 3rd of 5 Final stage: 2nd of 3
Home colours	Away colours

Phoenix Saudi Club, also known as Al-Anka Saudi Club (Arabic: نادي العنقاء السعودي) or simply Phoenix Ladies, (Arabic: سيدات العنقاء) is a Saudi professional women's football club based in Taif. The club currently plays in the Saudi Women's First Division League.

== History ==
=== Football ===
Established in 2022, amid the growing popularity of women's football in Saudi Arabia, the team joined the women's first division league in its inaugural season. Placed in Group 3 with Okaz and rivals Al-Amal, the team finished last, earning 4 points from 4 matches played.

In the 2022–23 season, the team entered with great determination and was placed in Group 4. Phoenix secured third place out of five teams, achieving their biggest win in history with a 27–0 triumph over Al-Hejaz in the first round. This result allowed them to qualify for the final stages as the best third-placed team. In the final stages, they won one match and lost another, which meant they did not achieve promotion but remained in the first-division.

=== Futsal ===
In 2023, The club expanded to include a futsal section and participated in the inaugural edition of the Saudi women's futsal championship. Drawn into the West Second Group, the team finished last, scoring 8 goals and conceding 44. In the 2024 edition, Phoenix returned undefeated, topping their group with 25 goals. They reached the semi-finals for the first time but lost both the semi-final and the third-place match, finishing fourth.

== Players ==
=== Current squad ===
As of 20 December 2024

Note: Flags indicate national team as defined under FIFA eligibility rules; some limited exceptions apply. Players may hold more than one non-FIFA nationality.

No.	Pos.	Nation	Player
4	DF	(Algeria) ALG	Wahiba Kadri
5	DF	(Algeria) ALG	Fouzia Bakli
6	DF	(Saudi Arabia) KSA	Sawsan Al-Fahmi
7	FW	(Saudi Arabia) KSA	Rahaf Al-Mutairi
8	FW	(Saudi Arabia) KSA	Raghad Bajafar
9	FW	(Saudi Arabia) KSA	Rahmah Al-Sufyani
10	MF	(Saudi Arabia) KSA	Haneen Mohammed
11	MF	(Morocco) MAR	Soumia Saber
13	FW	(Georgia (country)) GEO	Ana Kirvalidze
15	DF	(Algeria) ALG	Zeyneb Kandouci
16	FW	(Algeria) ALG	Houria Affak
18	DF	(Saudi Arabia) KSA	Saja Al-Manjoumi
17	FW	(Algeria) ALG	Rahma Benaichouche

No.	Pos.	Nation	Player
21	GK	(Saudi Arabia) KSA	Layan Al-Thaqafi
22	MF	(Saudi Arabia) KSA	Amjad Al-Sufyani
77	DF	(Saudi Arabia) KSA	Nujud Al-Rabie
—	MF	(Saudi Arabia) KSA	Nouf Al-Zahrani
—	MF	(Saudi Arabia) KSA	Rimas Al-Malki
—	DF	(Saudi Arabia) KSA	Yusra Torkey
—	DF	(Saudi Arabia) KSA	Reem Al-Zahrani
—	DF	(Saudi Arabia) KSA	Alaa Al-Zahrani
—	DF	(Saudi Arabia) KSA	Shouq Al-Harthi
—	GK	(Saudi Arabia) KSA	Sadeem Al-Zhrani
—	GK	(Saudi Arabia) KSA	Amirah Al-Humaidi
—	MF	(Saudi Arabia) KSA	Wajd Al-Amri
—	MF	(Saudi Arabia) KSA	Jawharah Al-Thobaiti

== Records ==
=== Season-by-season ===
As of October 23, 2023

Season	League									Cup	Top scorer	
Season	Div.	P	W	D	L	GF	GA	Pts.	Pos.	Cup	Player	Goals
2022–23	SWD1L	4	1	1	2	21	15	4	11th	—	Unknown	
2023–24	SWD1L	10	5	1	4	63	26	16	6th	—	Unknown	
2024–25	SWD1L	to be determined										
