= United Eagles FC =

United Eagles
- Full name: United Eagles Football Club
- Founded: 2016; 9 years ago
- Manager: Rosen Ilkov
- League: Saudi Women's First Division League
- 2023–24: SW1DL, 11th of 26; Regular season: 2nd of 5 Final rounds: 3rd of 3
Home colours	Away colours

United Eagles Football Club (Arabic: نادي إتحاد النسور لكرة القدم) is a Saudi professional women's football club based in Khobar, Eastern Province, currently playing in the Saudi Women's First Division League.

== History ==
Founded in 2016, Impact Women's Football Club started with college girls and their teachers, facing challenges like limited training and sponsorship due to the state of women's sports. Yet, they participated in different tournaments and played friendly matches with Bahraini teams, becoming one of the kingdom's early teams.

The team joined the inaugural Women's community football league. and also competed in the first tournament organized by the Saudi Arabian Football Federation, the regional women's football championship.

United Eagles competed in the first division league's debut season, placed in the east group alongside Al-Mutahed, Al-Taraji, and Flaij. They secured a second-place finish, earning them a spot in the quarter-finals. However, they lost 1–2 to the eventual champions, Al-Riyadh, resulting in their elimination from the competition.

The club was slated to take part in the first SAFF Women's Cup, scheduled to face Al-Ittihad in the round of 16. However, the team later withdrew from the tournament due to unforeseen circumstances.

In the 2023–24 season, the club finished second in Group 2 with 6 wins out of 8 matches. This secured their spot in the finals and kept them safe from relegation. In the final rounds, the club faced two heavy defeats, losing 5–0 and 8–2, which dashed their hopes of promotion.

== Players ==
=== Current squad ===
As of 24 March 2024 Note: Flags indicate national team as defined under FIFA eligibility rules; some limited exceptions apply. Players may hold more than one non-FIFA nationality.

No.	Pos.	Nation	Player
—	FW	BHR	Rawan Al-Ali
—	FW	BHR	Leleya Sabkar
—	MF	BHR	Amira Sowar
—	DF	BHR	Fatema Al-Nesuf
—	MF	KSA	Mashael
—	DF	ALG	Naïma Barkat
—	MF	KSA	Rand Al-Shayea
—	MF	MAR	Nawal Ez-Zine

No.	Pos.	Nation	Player
—		KSA	Heesah Al-Thani
—		KSA	Layan Al-Fathi
—		KSA	Renad Khoge
—		KSA	Shahad Al-Mishel
—		KSA	Mezon Al-Ajmi
—		KSA	Rana Al-Zahrani
—		KSA	Mey Al-Jishi
—	GK	KSA	Shahaad Al-Khaldi
