= Abha Club (women) =

Women's football club from Abha, Saudi Arabia

- Full name: Abha Women Football Club
- Nickname: Zaeemat Al-Janoub (The Women Leaders of the South)
- Founded: 2023; 3 years ago
- Ground: Prince Sultan bin Abdul Aziz Stadium, Abha
- League: Saudi Women's First Division League
- 2023–24: SWFDL, 2nd in group B Overall: 5th of 26
Home colours	Away colours

Abha Women Football Club shortly known as Abha's ladies (Arabic: سيدات أبها) is a is Saudi professional women's football club affiliated with Abha Club. The club currently competes in the Saudi Women's First Division League.

== History ==
Founded in 2023, the team joined the Saudi Women's First Division League, the second tier of women's football in Saudi Arabia, for the 2023–24 season. The team was placed in the Western Region Group alongside Al-Amal, Phoenix, Al-Ain, and Al-Hejaz. Al-zaeemat kicked off the season with a resounding win. The team finished 2nd in their group, which qualified them for the final stages and ensured that, at worst, they would remain in the first division. Abha, scheduled to play against Al Bayraq in the final stage. had their match cancelled when Al Bayraq failed to field enough players, resulting in a 3–0 win for Abha by default. In their second match, Abha faced the eventual champions and ended in a 1–1 draw, which led to their elimination. Al-Ula advanced due to their superior goal difference, as they played Al Bayraq unlike Abha.

== Players and staff ==
=== Current squad ===
As of 21 December 2024

Note: Flags indicate national team as defined under FIFA eligibility rules; some limited exceptions apply. Players may hold more than one non-FIFA nationality.

No.	Pos.	Nation	Player
1	GK	KSA	Samar Abdulaziz
3	MF	GUI	Damaye Camara
4	DF	EGY	Eman Hassan
5	DF	KSA	Laren Sarhan
7	MF	KSA	Amirah Hazazi
8	DF	KSA	Hanan Aziz
10	FW	TUN	Mariem Houij
11	MF	KSA	Ghala Al-Qahtani
12	DF	KSA	Ghala Al-Shahrani

No.	Pos.	Nation	Player
13	DF	KSA	Shrooq Futaini
14	FW	GUI	Fanta Camara
18	MF	KSA	Samaher Al Salahi
19	DF	KSA	Lujain Al-Bishri
22	GK	KSA	Afrah Al-Rashidi
25	GK	KSA	Ghala Saad
27	DF	GUI	Mawa Traoré
29	MF	KSA	Sabah Al-Fayi
30	DF	KSA	Danah Al-Tali

=== Coaching staff ===
Position	Name
Head coach	(Egypt) Faiza Haider
Assistant coaches	
Goalkeeping coach	
Managing director	
Recruitment manager	
Physiotherapist	
Lead analyst	
Club doctor	
Kit manager	
