= Al-Taraji Club (women) =

Saudi women's football club

Al-Taraji
- Head coach Isa alainawy
- Full name: Al-Taraji Women's Football Club
- Nickname: Sayidat Al Bahara (The Sailors Ladies)
- Founded: 2022; 4 years ago
- Ground: Prince Nayef bin Abdulaziz Stadium; Qatif, Saudi Arabia
- Capacity: 12,000
- Team Manager: Shereen Qaheri
- League: Saudi Women's First Division League
- 2024–25: 10th in Saudi Women's Premier League
| Home colours | Away colours |

Al-Taraji Women's Football Club or simply Al-Taraji Ladies (Arabic: سيدات الترجي) is a professional women's football section of Al-Taraji Club based in Qatif. The club plays in Saudi Arabia's top-tier league, Premier League.

== History ==
=== Oasis W.F.C ===
Formed in 2019 as the Oasis Women's Football Team (Arabic: فريق الواحة النسائي), the team was the first team to be formed in Qatif region. officially registered in January 2021, it consisted of over 30 amateur players to participate in the upcoming National Saudi Championship in October, showcasing the talent from the Al-Ahsa Oasis region in women's football.

=== Al-Taraji ===
In September 2022, following its acquisition by Al-Taraji, the club took part in the first-ever Saudi Women's First Division League. Placed in Group 5, the team from the Eastern Province finished 3rd out of 4, accumulating 10 points through 3 wins, 1 draw, and 2 losses. Unfortunately, this performance fell short of earning them a spot in the playoffs.

During the 2023–24 season, the team bolstered its roster by acquiring international players and brought in Bahraini coach Isa Al-Ainawy and Bahraini Team Manager Shereen Qaheri. Finishing at the top of their group with a flawless record of 8 wins out of 8 and scoring 99 goals, the team earned qualification for the playoff stage.

In 2024, the team secured promotion to the Saudi Women's Premier League by reaching the final of the play-off stage in the Saudi Women's First Division League.

== Players ==
=== Current squad ===
As of 12 October 2024

Note: Flags indicate national team as defined under FIFA eligibility rules; some limited exceptions apply. Players may hold more than one non-FIFA nationality.

| No. | Pos. | Nation | Player |
|---|---|---|---|
| 2 | MF | TUN | Dhekra Mahfoudh |
| 4 | DF | KSA | Fatimah Al-Sadah |
| 5 | MF | TUN | Wafe Messaoud |
| 6 | MF | KSA | Nadeen Al-Faris |
| 7 | FW | KSA | Joud Al-Balhart |
| 8 | MF | KSA | Jana Al-Askar |
| 9 | MF | KSA | Jana Al-Habib |
| 10 | MF | KSA | Bayan Felimban |
| 11 | FW | KSA | Shaikha Al-Asiri |
| 12 | DF | KSA | Taif Awadh |
| 13 | MF | KSA | Maimouna Khayat |
| 14 | DF | KSA | Fatimah Al-Sinan |
| 15 | DF | KSA | Sarah Al-Sahli |
| 16 | DF | KSA | Rania Al-Ghamdi |
| 17 | FW | BHR | Hajar Al-Ansari |
| 19 | DF | KSA | Zainab Al-Humaidi |
| 20 | FW | COD | Grâce Mfwamba |
| 22 | GK | BRA | Mayara Gonçalves |

| No. | Pos. | Nation | Player |
|---|---|---|---|
| 24 | MF | KSA | Dana Al-Marhoun |
| 29 | DF | KSA | Al Sadof Suhail |
| 30 | MF | KSA | Taif Al-Sarwani |
| 90 | MF | KSA | Hawra Al-Mutailq |
| 99 | MF | KSA | Aishah Al-Jumaan |
| — | GK | KSA | Zahra Al-Saif |
| — | GK | KSA | Hadaya Al-Harbi |
| — | DF | KSA | Lara Al Faraj |
| — | DF | KSA | Khaula Al-Attooq |
| — | DF | KSA | Khulod Al-Duhaim |
| — | MF | KSA | Rabab Al-Sadah |
| — | FW | KSA | Essra Al-Awami |
| — | FW | KSA | Noor Abulhasan |
| — | MF | KSA | Batool Al-Nasser |
| — | MF | KSA | Fatimah Al-Ekhwan |
| — | MF | KSA | Shahad Al-Matroook |

== Recent seasons ==
| Season | Division | Pos. | Pld. | W | D | L | GS | GA | Pts. | Cup | Notes |
|---|---|---|---|---|---|---|---|---|---|---|---|
| 2022–23 | 1. Division League | Group 5: 3rd of 4 | 6 | 3 | 1 | 2 | 18 | 10 | 10 | N/A | |
| 2023–24 | 1. Division League | Final: 2nd of 26 | 11 | 10 | 1 | 0 | 109 | 5 | 31 | N/A | ▲ Promoted to the Premier League |

== Honours ==
- Saudi Women's First Division League:
  - Finalist: 2023–24
