= Saudi Women's First Division League =

Second-tier women's football league in Saudi Arabia

Saudi Women's First Division League دوري الدرجة الأولى للسيدات السعودي
- Organising body: Saudi Arabian Football Federation
- Founded: 15 September 2022; 4 years ago
- Country: Saudi Arabia
- Confederation: AFC
- Number of clubs: 8
- Level on pyramid: 2
- Promotion to: Saudi Women's Premier League
- Relegation to: Saudi Women's Second Division League
- Domestic cup(s): SAFF Super Cup; SAFF Women's Cup
- Current champions: Al-Taraji (1st title) (2025–26)
- Most championships: Al-Riyadh; Al-Ula; Neom; Al-Taraji (1 title each)
- Broadcaster: SAFF+
- Website: saff.com.sa
- Current: 2026–27 Saudi Women's First Division League

The Saudi Women's First Division League, officially the SAFF Women's First Division League, is the second-tier Saudi women's football league in the Saudi football league system, below the Saudi Women's Premier League.

== History and format ==
In September 2022, the federation approved the establishment of the First Division League, with the participation of 17 teams distributed across three regions. The league began on November 11, with teams playing both home and away matches.

The First Division champion was determined through a knockout system. The winning team was promoted to the Premier League for the following season, replacing the last-placed team, which was relegated.

In September 2023, it was announced that 26 teams would participate in the second season of the division, including the addition of nine new professional teams. The 2023–24 season featured 30 teams in total.

In November 2023, the Saudi Football Federation announced that the format of the 2024–25 edition would be changed. Instead of featuring a group stage and a knockout stage, the competition would adopt a 9-team league format with home and away matches.

On 25 September 2024, the Saudi Arabian Football Federation announced that matches of the 2024–25 season would be broadcast on television for the first time via the (SAFF+) platform.

In the 2025–26 season, the number of participating teams was reduced to 8.

== Current teams ==
The following 8 teams are competing in the 2025–26 season.

Locations of the 2025–26 Saudi Women's First Division League teams

Team	Location	Ground	2024–25 Season
Al-Amal	Riyadh	Al-Motawa Academy Stadium	PL, 9th
Al-Hmmah	Riyadh	Al-Yamamah University Stadium	4th
Al-Nahda	Dammam	Al-Nahda Club Stadium	D2, 2nd
Al-Taraji	Qatif	Al-Taraji Club Stadium	PL, 10th
Al-Yarmouk	Jazan	King Faisal Sports City Stadium	D2, 3rd
Najmat Jeddah	Jeddah	King Abdulaziz University Stadium	D2, 1st
Phoenix	Taif	King Fahd Sports City Annex Stadium 1	7th
United Eagles	Qatif; Safwa City	Al-Taraji Club Stadium; Prince Nayef Sports City Stadium; Al-Safa Club Stadium	5th

== Champions ==
Season	Winners	Runners-up	Third place	Ref
2022–23	Al-Riyadh	Al-Mutahed	Jeddah Pride	
2023–24	Al-Ula	Al-Taraji	Al-Amal	
2024–25	Neom	Abha	Al-Riyadh	
2025–26	Al-Taraji	Al-Nahda	Al-Amal	

== Awards ==
The following awards were given at the conclusion of the season:

Season	Best Player	Top Goalscorer	Best Goalkeeper
2022–23	(Tunisia) Ibtissem Ben Mohamed (Jeddah Pride)	(Tunisia) Rahma Ghars (Saham) – 22 goals	(Bahrain) Khulood Saleh (Al-Mutahed)
2023–24	(Bosnia and Herzegovina) Selma Kapetanović (Al-Ula)	(Tunisia) Wafe Messaoud (Al-Taraji) – 36 goals	(Canada) Chandra Bednar (Al-Ula)
2024–25	(Colombia) Diana Celis (NEOM)	(Guinea) Fanta Camara (Abha) – 43 goals	(Saudi Arabia) Haifa Al-Safyani (NEOM)
2025–26	(Democratic Republic of the Congo) Grâce Mfwamba (Al-Taraji)	(Guinea) Fanta Camara (Al-Amal) – 36 goals	(Saudi Arabia) Maria Al-Najjar (Al-Nahda)

== Broadcasters ==
Since the 2024–25 season

Region	Broadcaster	Ref.
Worldwide	SAFF+	

== See also ==
- Madaris League
- Saudi Women's Cup
- Saudi Women's Super Cup
- Women's association football
- Saudi Women's Premier League
- Women's football in Saudi Arabia
- Saudi Women's Premier Challenge Cup
- Saudi Girls' youth football competitions
- Saudi Women's Second Division League
