= 2026–27 Saudi Girls' U-17 Premier League =

Saudi Girls' U-17 Premier League
- Season: 2026–27
- Dates: 11 September 2025 – 19 February 2027

The 2026–27 Saudi Girls' U-17 Premier League, is the second season of the Saudi Girls' U-17 Premier League, the top-level Saudi Girls' youth football competitions in Saudi Arabia.

== Teams ==
After the conclusion of the 2025–26 season, the Saudi Arabian Football Federation increased the number of participating clubs from 7 to 8 clubs after the promotion of the 2025–26 Saudi Girls U-17 First Division League Champion and runner-up Jeddah United Academy and Najmat Jeddah, and the relegation of the seventh and last place team Eastern Flames to the 2026–27 Saudi Girls U-17 First Division League.

Locations of the 2026–27 Saudi Girls' U-17 Premier League teams

| Team | Location | Ground | Capacity | 2025–26 Season |
|---|---|---|---|---|
| Al-Ahli | Jeddah | Al-Ahli Club Stadium | 10,000 | 5th |
| Al-Hilal | Riyadh | Inaya Medical Colleges Stadium | 2,000 | 1st |
| Al-Ittihad | Jeddah | Al-Ittihad Club Stadium | 15,000 | 2nd |
| Al-Nassr | Riyadh | Al-Nassr Club Stadium | 10,000 | 4th |
| Al-Qadsiah | Khobar | Prince Saud bin Jalawi Sports City | 11,000 | 3th |
| Al-Ula | Medina | Prince Mohammed Bin Abdulaziz Sports City | 24,000 | 6th |
| Jeddah United | Jeddah | King Abdulaziz University Stadium | 3,000 | D1, 1st (Promoted) |
| Najmat Jeddah | Jeddah | Madira Stadium | 2,000 | D1, 2nd (Promoted) |

=== managers and captains ===
| Team | Manager | Captain |
|---|---|---|
| Al-Ahli | (Serbia) Dragan Vukovic | (Saudi Arabia) Dima Shaikh |
| Al-Hilal | (Spain) Adrián Fumero Gorrín | (Saudi Arabia) Hala Al-Shudukhi |
| Al-Ittihad | (Spain) Alex Piache | (Saudi Arabia) Joud Al-Amoudi |
| Al-Nassr | (Tunisia) Slim Ghazouani | (Saudi Arabia) Lana Al-Hudaithi |
| Al-Qadsiah | (Cyprus) Victoria Zamba | (Saudi Arabia) Maha Al-Badrani |
| Al-Ula | (Portugal) Willian Silva | (Saudi Arabia) Lara Al-Nassr |
| Jeddah United | (Syria) Talal Shoman | (Saudi Arabia) Aisha Al-Maddah |
| Najmat Jeddah | (Saudi Arabia) Hani Anani | (Saudi Arabia) Aleena Bugis |

== League table ==
| Pos | Team | Pld | W | D | L | GF | GA | GD | Pts | Relegation |
|---|---|---|---|---|---|---|---|---|---|---|
| 1 | Al-Ittihad | 6 | 4 | 1 | 1 | 40 | 2 | +38 | 13 | |
| 2 | Al-Qadsiah | 5 | 4 | 1 | 0 | 14 | 2 | +12 | 13 | |
| 3 | Al-Hilal | 5 | 4 | 0 | 1 | 44 | 3 | +41 | 12 | |
| 4 | Al-Ula | 6 | 3 | 1 | 2 | 16 | 13 | +3 | 10 | |
| 5 | Al-Ahli | 5 | 3 | 0 | 2 | 9 | 7 | +2 | 9 | |
| 6 | Al-Nassr | 5 | 1 | 1 | 3 | 12 | 12 | 0 | 4 | |
| 7 | Najmat Jeddah | 7 | 1 | 0 | 6 | 5 | 63 | −58 | 3 | |
| 8 | Jeddah United | 5 | 0 | 0 | 5 | 1 | 39 | −38 | 0 | Relegation to the 2027–28 First Division League |

Updated to match(es) played on 13 November 2026. Source: SAFF
Rules for classification: 1) Points; 2) Goal difference; 3) Number of goals scored.

== Results ==
The season's match schedule was announced in October 2025.

| Home \ Away | ULA | QDS | NAS | AHL | ITH | HIL | JUA | NJM |
|---|---|---|---|---|---|---|---|---|
| Al-Ula | | 5 Feb | 2–0 | 18 Dec | 0–3 | 22 Jan | 11 Dec | 19 Feb |
| Al-Qadsiah | 25 Dec | | 4–1 | 5–0 | 19 Feb | 2–0 | PPD | 29 Jan |
| Al-Nassr | 3–3 | 22 Jan | | 12 Feb | 5 Feb | 0–3 | 18 Dec | 8–0 |
| Al-Ahli | 29 Jan | 0–2 | PPD | | 11 Dec | 5 Feb | 19 Feb | 6–0 |
| Al-Ittihad | 12 Feb | 1–1 | 25 Dec | 0–1 | | 18 Dec | 22 Jan | 12–0 |
| Al-Hilal | 7–1 | 11 Dec | 19 Feb | 25 Dec | 29 Jan | | 19–0 | 15–0 |
| Jeddah United | 0–3 | 12 Feb | 29 Jan | 0–2 | 0–10 | 13 Nov | | 1–5 |
| Najmat Jeddah | 0–7 | 18 Dec | 11 Dec | 22 Jan | 0–14 | 11 Feb | 5 Feb | |

Updated to match(es) played on 13 November 2026. Source: SAFF
Legend: Blue = home team win; Yellow = draw; Red = away team win.

== Season statistics ==
=== Scoring ===
- First goal of the season:
  - (Saudi Arabia) Dana Al-Mhmoud (Al-Ittihad) against Najmat Jeddah (11 September 2026)

=== Top scorers ===
As of 16 November 2026

| Rank | Player | Club | Goals |
|---|---|---|---|
| 1 | (Saudi Arabia) Kenzy El-Sadany | Al Hilal | 13 |
| 2 | (Saudi Arabia) Danah Al-Dhuhiyan | Al Hilal | 9 |
| 3 | (Saudi Arabia) Khulud Bin-Khutheila | Al Ula | 7 |
| 4 | (Saudi Arabia) Hiba Ouhachi | Al Ittihad | 6 |
| 5 | (France) Asma Azis | Al Ula | 5 |
| 5 | (Saudi Arabia) Sadeyah Hassan | Al Nassr | 5 |
| 5 | (Yemen) Joud Salem | Al Ittihad | 5 |
| 8 | (Saudi Arabia) Souar Al-Amri | Al Hilal | 4 |
| 8 | (Saudi Arabia) Dana Al-Mhmoud | Al Ittihad | 4 |
| 8 | (Saudi Arabia) Layan Al-Yafei | Al Ittihad | 4 |
| 8 | (France) Lina Benhabib | Al Nassr | 4 |

=== Clean sheets ===
As of 8 November 2026

| Rank | Player | Club | Clean sheets |
|---|---|---|---|
| 1 | (Saudi Arabia) Jood Al-Saqer | Al-Qadsiah | 2 |
| 1 | (Saudi Arabia) Ranse Al-Hejaili | Al-Ula | 2 |
| 1 | (Saudi Arabia) Dana Al-Binali | Al-Hilal | 2 |
| 1 | (Saudi Arabia) Waten Al-Zahrani | Al-Ahli | 2 |
| 5 | (Saudi Arabia) Sarah Barnawi | Al-Ittihad | 1 |
| 5 | (Saudi Arabia) Dima Shaikh | Al-Ahli | 1 |
| 5 | (Saudi Arabia) Dona Al-Fayez | Al-Nassr | 1 |
| 5 | (Saudi Arabia) Albatul Bakhsh | Al-Ittihad | 1 |
| 5 | (Saudi Arabia) ِAmnah Majrashi | Al-Hilal | 1 |
| 5 | (Saudi Arabia) Mariam Al-Tayar | Al-Ittihad | 1 |
| 5 | (Saudi Arabia) Sarah Al-Reahili | Al-Ula | 1 |

=== Hat-tricks ===
| Player | For | Against | Result | Date | Ref. |
|---|---|---|---|---|---|
| (Saudi Arabia) Danah Al-Mahmoud | Al-Ittihad | Najmat Jeddah | 14–0 (A) | 11 September 2026 | |
| (Yemen) Joud Salem | Al-Ittihad | Najmat Jeddah | 14–0 (A) | 11 September 2026 | |
| (Saudi Arabia) Kenzy El-Sadany | Al-Hilal | Jeddah United | 19–0 (H) | 12 September 2026 | |
| (Saudi Arabia) Sadeyah Hassan | Al-Nassr | Najmat Jeddah | 8–0 (H) | 18 September 2026 | |
| (France) Lina Benhabib | Al-Nassr | Najmat Jeddah | 8–0 (H) | 18 September 2026 | |
| (Saudi Arabia) Danah Al-Dhuhiyan | Al-Hilal | Al-Ula | 7–1 (H) | 22 September 2026 | |
| (Saudi Arabia) Danah Al-Dhuhiyan | Al-Hilal | Najmat Jeddah | 15–0 (H) | 31 October 2026 | |
| (Saudi Arabia) Kenzy El-Sadany | Al-Hilal | Najmat Jeddah | 15–0 (H) | 31 October 2026 | |
| (Saudi Arabia) Khulud Bin Khutheila | Al-Ula | Najmat Jeddah | 7–0 (A) | 6 November 2026 | |
| (France) Asma Azis | Al-Ula | Najmat Jeddah | 7–0 (A) | 6 November 2026 | |

== See also ==
- 2026–27 Saudi Women's Premier League
- 2025–26 Saudi Women's Cup
- 2025–26 Saudi Women's First Division League
- Dawri Madaris
