= 2026 WAFF U-17 Women's Championship squads =

The following is a list of squads for each national team competing at the 2026 WAFF U-17 Women's Championship. The tournament takes place in Zarqa, Jordan, from 17 to 25 July 2026. It is the sixth edition of the international youth football championship organised by WAFF for the women's under-17 national teams.

Players born between 1 January 2010 and 31 December 2012 were eligible to compete in the tournament.

The age listed for each player is their age as of 17 July 2026, the first day of the tournament. The club listed is the club for which the player last played a competitive match prior to the tournament. The nationality for each club reflects the national association (not the league) to which the club is affiliated. A flag is included for coaches who are of a different nationality to their team.

== Group A ==
=== Lebanon ===
Lebanon announced their final squad on 14 July 2026.

Head coach: Joseph Mouawad

No.	Pos.	Player	Date of birth (age)	Club
1	GK	Ghinwa Karam	4 December 2010 (aged 15)	(Lebanese Football Association) BFA
2	DF	Yasmina Nassar	1 April 2011 (aged 15)	(Lebanese Football Association) BFA
3	DF	Marita Chebly	16 September 2011 (aged 14)	(Lebanese Football Association) EFP
4	DF	Jane Dib	3 August 2012 (aged 13)	(Lebanese Football Association) EFP
5	DF	Yara Abi Fadel	28 May 2010 (aged 16)	(Lebanese Football Association) BFA
6	MF	Gaelle Abou Malhab	4 March 2010 (aged 16)	(Lebanese Football Association) BFA
7	DF	Christina Chebly	16 September 2011 (aged 14)	(Lebanese Football Association) EFP
8	MF	Lamar Arab	25 June 2012 (aged 14)	(Lebanese Football Association) BFA
9	FW	Angy Boustany	9 September 2010 (aged 15)	(Lebanese Football Association) No Limits
10	FW	Yara Geitani	24 September 2010 (aged 15)	(Lebanese Football Association) Nejmeh
11	MF	Meriam Monzer	27 February 2012 (aged 14)	(Lebanese Football Association) No Limits
12	DF	Malak Hussein	9 February 2012 (aged 14)	(Lebanese Football Association) Jwaya
13	DF	Lynn Bou Ghazele	27 May 2011 (aged 15)	(Lebanese Football Association) BFA
14	DF	Reem Younes	6 July 2010 (aged 16)	(Lebanese Football Association) No Limits
15	MF	Acil Hajj	5 May 2011 (aged 15)	(Lebanese Football Association) BFA
16	FW	Monica Boulos	4 October 2012 (aged 13)	(Lebanese Football Association) Salam Zgharta
17	MF	Rama Kharroubi	27 July 2010 (aged 15)	(Lebanese Football Association) No Limits
18	FW	Christina Haydar	20 June 2012 (aged 14)	(Lebanese Football Association) Nejmeh
19	FW	Diva-Luna Hajj	11 January 2013 (aged 13)	(Lebanese Football Association) BFA
20	FW	Sarah Saad	14 January 2011 (aged 15)	(Lebanese Football Association) Jwaya
21	FW	Assil Jaafar Hamzeh	15 December 2011 (aged 14)	(Lebanese Football Association) Nejmeh
22	GK	Sophia Fayad	3 December 2012 (aged 13)	(Lebanese Football Association) Nejmeh
23	GK	Nourhan Rafeh	25 July 2010 (aged 15)	(Lebanese Football Association) Nejmeh

=== Syria ===
Syria announced their final squad on 4 July 2026.

Head coach: Hesham Al-Sharebeene

No.	Pos.	Player	Date of birth (age)	Club
1	GK	Media Housain	Unknown	(Syrian Football Association) Al-Hilal SC
3	MF	Bayan Jomaa Ato	Unknown	(Syrian Football Association) Homs Governorate Club
4		Arwa Ahmed	Unknown	Unknown
5	DF	Amal Issa	Unknown	(Syrian Football Association) Homs Governorate Club
6	MF	Lilas Ebrahim	Unknown	(Syrian Football Association) Al-Hilal SC
7	DF	Masa Mena	Unknown	(Syrian Football Association) Homs Governorate Club
8		Arin Asaad (Captain)	Unknown	(Syrian Football Association) Al-Hilal SC
9		Emma Zidane	Unknown	(Syrian Football Association) Homs Governorate Club
10		Feryal Hosaini	Unknown	(Syrian Football Association) Al-Hilal SC
11	DF	Tasneem Al-Ktaish	Unknown	(Syrian Football Association) Al-Hilal SC
12		Sham Mashaal	Unknown	Unknown
14		Sham Al-Salamah	Unknown	(Syrian Football Association) Homs Governorate Club
15	DF	Mayas Sari	Unknown	Unknown
18	DF	Bushra Al-Khelif	Unknown	(Syrian Football Association) Al-Hilal SC
19		Shahd Al-Fahal	Unknown	Unknown
20		Aya Housin	Unknown	Unknown
		Saja Hussein Agha	Unknown	Unknown
	GK	Gouli Al-Rifaei	Unknown	Unknown
		Ghazal Jabbour	Unknown	Unknown
	GK	Rawan Malik	Unknown	(Syrian Football Association) Al-Hilal SC
		Maryam Abu Maghdab	Unknown	Unknown

=== Saudi Arabia ===
Saudi Arabia announced their final squad on 16 July 2026.

Head coach: (Greece) Katerina Falida

No.	Pos.	Player	Date of birth (age)	Club
1	GK	Dana Al-Binali	Unknown	(Saudi Arabian Football Federation) Al Hilal
2	MF	Juwaan Al-Nassar	Unknown	(Saudi Arabian Football Federation) Al Qadsiah
3	DF	Retal Hakami	Unknown	(Saudi Arabian Football Federation) Al Qadsiah
4	DF	Arwa Al-Rasheed	Unknown	(Saudi Arabian Football Federation) Al-Nassr
5	DF	Diyala Soruji	Unknown	(Saudi Arabian Football Federation) Al-Ittihad
6	MF	Hiba Ouhachi	Unknown	(Saudi Arabian Football Federation) Al-Ittihad
7	FW	Yara Al-Saleh	Unknown	(Saudi Arabian Football Federation) Al Hilal
8	DF	Hawra Al-Homidi	Unknown	(Saudi Arabian Football Federation) Al Qadsiah
9	FW	Danah Al-Dhuhiyan (Captain)	Unknown	(Saudi Arabian Football Federation) Al Hilal
10	MF	Ghaday Al-Otaibi	22 August 2011 (aged 14)	(Saudi Arabian Football Federation) Al-Nassr
11	MF	Rimas El-Banawany	Unknown	(Saudi Arabian Football Federation) Al Qadsiah
12	FW	Sadeya Obid	Unknown	(Saudi Arabian Football Federation) Al-Nassr
13	MF	Dima Ibrahim	Unknown	
14	MF	Hala Al-Shudukhi	Unknown	(Saudi Arabian Football Federation) Al Hilal
15	DF	Swar Al-Kaabi	Unknown	(Saudi Arabian Football Federation) Al Hilal
16	MF	Dema Hegazy	Unknown	(Saudi Arabian Football Federation) Al-Ittihad
17	MF	Sadeem Al-Suhaymi	Unknown	(Saudi Arabian Football Federation) Al Qadsiah
18	MF	Ghala Kurdi	Unknown	(Saudi Arabian Football Federation) Al-Ula
19	FW	Zaenab Al Sharaf	Unknown	(Saudi Arabian Football Federation) Al Qadsiah
20	FW	Kenzy El-Sadany	Unknown	(Saudi Arabian Football Federation) Al Hilal
21	GK	Jood Al-Saqer	Unknown	(Saudi Arabian Football Federation) Al Qadsiah
22	GK	Mariam Al-Tayar	Unknown	(Saudi Arabian Football Federation) Al-Ittihad
23	DF	Joud Al-Amoudi	Unknown	(Saudi Arabian Football Federation) Al-Ittihad

=== United Arab Emirates ===
The United Arab Emirates announced their final squad on 15 July 2026.

Head coach: Houriya Taheri

No.	Pos.	Player	Date of birth (age)	Club
1	GK	Ghalya Jama	Unknown	Unknown
2	DF	Shamma Al-Mazrouei	Unknown	Unknown
3	DF	Salama Al-Najjar	Unknown	Unknown
4	FW	Mahra Ahli	Unknown	Unknown
5	DF	Rwqaya Al-Blooshi	Unknown	Unknown
6	DF	Maryam Al-Mansoori	Unknown	Unknown
7	MF	Amna Al-Madani	Unknown	Unknown
8	MF	Shamsah Al-Blooshi	Unknown	Unknown
9	FW	Qasayed Al-Khoori	Unknown	Unknown
10	MF	Naya Al-Mahmoud	Unknown	Unknown
11	MF	Jawaher Al-Maysari	Unknown	Unknown
12	DF	Meera Yateem	Unknown	Unknown
13	GK	Mariam Fairooz	Unknown	Unknown
14	DF	Ghala Al-Hamar	Unknown	Unknown
15	FW	Roudha Al-Mheiri	Unknown	Unknown
16	FW	Malak Al-Ali	Unknown	Unknown
17	MF	Malak Al-Blooshi	Unknown	Unknown
18	FW	Hind Al-Farsi	Unknown	Unknown
19	MF	Shama Al-Suwaidi	Unknown	Unknown
20	DF	Ruwda Al-Madani	Unknown	Unknown
21	GK	Dana Al-Shrooqi	Unknown	Unknown
22	FW	Shouq Al-Blooshi	Unknown	Unknown
23	DF	Alia Sulaiman	Unknown	Unknown

== Group B ==
=== Jordan ===
Jordan announced their final squad on 14 July 2026.

Head coach: Luna Al-Masri

No.	Pos.	Player	Date of birth (age)	Club
1	GK	Alma Shatat	Unknown	Unknown
2		Maria Al-Mosa	Unknown	Unknown
3		Iman Al-Tmaizi	Unknown	(Jordan Football Association) Etihad
4		Layan D'mour	Unknown	Unknown
5		Nuha Al-Qaisi	Unknown	(Jordan Football Association) Nashama Al-Mustaqbal
6		Leen Soubar	Unknown	Unknown
7		Leen Abu-Helweh	Unknown	Unknown
8		Yena Dweik	Unknown	Unknown
9		Lynn Al-Qaisi	Unknown	Unknown
10		Nadin Abu Salha (Captain)	Unknown	Unknown
11		Taima'a Ja'ara	Unknown	Unknown
12	GK	Maya Sayyed	Unknown	(Jordan Football Association) Etihad
13		Lamar Yousif	Unknown	Unknown
14		Jia Swaileh	Unknown	Unknown
15		Toleen Obeidat	Unknown	Unknown
16	DF	Jude Irtaimeh	Unknown	(Jordan Football Association) Etihad
17		Alma Al-Saify	Unknown	(Jordan Football Association) Etihad
18		Liyan Al-Maghasleh	Unknown	Unknown
19		Ragad Haqrous	Unknown	Unknown
20		Sahar Abdul Rahim	Unknown	Unknown
21		Joud Daoud	Unknown	(Jordan Football Association) Amman
22	GK	Raya Abu-Rumman	Unknown	(Jordan Football Association) Nashama Al-Mustaqbal
23		Yasmin Madadha	Unknown	(Jordan Football Association) Etihad

=== Bahrain ===
Bahrain announced their final squad on 15 July 2026.

Head coach: Khaled Al-Harban

No.	Pos.	Player	Date of birth (age)	Club
1	GK	Dhabya Al-Muraisi	Unknown	Unknown
2	DF	Zainab Al-Saffar	19 May 2010 (aged 16)	Unknown
3		Noor Al-Aali	Unknown	Unknown
6		Noreen El-Marsafawy (Captain)	8 August 2010 (aged 15)	Unknown
7		Samana Ashoor	13 June 2012 (aged 14)	Unknown
8		Rana Bastaki	Unknown	Unknown
9		Yara Ali	Unknown	Unknown
10		Al-Joory Mohamed	31 August 2012 (aged 13)	Unknown
11		Fatima Mahdi	Unknown	Unknown
12		Khawla Maher	Unknown	Unknown
15		Jenna Khalifa	Unknown	Unknown
16	GK	Mariam Hamada	2 November 2011 (aged 14)	Unknown
17		Noora Abdulaal	Unknown	Unknown
22		Rayyanah Khairalla	21 January 2010 (aged 16)	Unknown
		Janeen Al-Bayat	Unknown	Unknown
		Yara Al-Wardi	3 January 2012 (aged 14)	Unknown
		Budoor Al-Burdoori	Unknown	Unknown
		Aisha Al-Dawy	Unknown	Unknown
		Raneem Ismail	Unknown	Unknown
		Rahaf Al-Eid	Unknown	Unknown
		Aseel Jassim	Unknown	Unknown
		Hala Al-Shanti	Unknown	Unknown

=== Palestine ===
Palestine announced their final squad on 16 July 2026.

Head coach: Ammar Jalaytah

No.	Pos.	Player	Date of birth (age)	Club
1	GK	Nora Sobhieh	Unknown	(Norwegian Football Federation) Unknown
2		Rimas Sarhan	Unknown	Unknown
4		Sara Yassin	Unknown	Unknown
5		Elaf Salah	Unknown	Unknown
6		Tala Al-Ali	Unknown	Unknown
7		Elena Balousha	Unknown	Unknown
8		Kareena Maayeh	Unknown	Unknown
9		Reetal Abu-Sarhan	Unknown	(Palestinian Football Association) Arab Orthodox Club
10		Rama Asad	Unknown	Unknown
11		Jana Jaber	Unknown	Unknown
12	DF	Selina Ghneim (Captain)	Unknown	Unknown
18	DF	Violet-Lina Phillips	Unknown	(Canadian Soccer Association) Richmond Hill SC
19		Malak Sababa	Unknown	(Palestinian Football Association) Arab Orthodox Club
20	DF	Lana Ghalayeni	Unknown	(Canadian Soccer Association) BTB Soccer Academy
21	MF	Lina Gamay	Unknown	(United States Soccer Federation) Fairfax Virginia Union
23	DF	Lily Nelson	Unknown	Unknown
	GK	Beatrice Makhlouf	Unknown	Unknown
		Faten Lutfi	Unknown	Unknown
		Yara Mansour	Unknown	Unknown
		Solaf Al-Khatib	Unknown	Unknown
		Salma Qawas	Unknown	Unknown
		Nada Ashour	Unknown	Unknown
		Nadine Ali	Unknown	Unknown
