= Mawadah Al-Maghrabi =

Saudi footballer (born 2009)

Personal information
- Full name: Mawadah Yahya Al-Maghrabi
- Date of birth: 1 January 2009 (age 17)
- Place of birth: Saudi Arabia
- Position: Winger

Team information
- Current team: Al-Hilal
- Number: 70

Senior career*
Years	Team	Apps	(Gls)
2023–2024	Golden Eagles		
2024–2026	Al-Nassr		
2026–	Al-Hilal		

International career
2024–2025	Saudi Arabia U17		
2025–	Saudi Arabia U20		
- * Club domestic league appearances and goals

Mawadah Yahya Al-Maghrabi (Arabic: مودة يحيى المغربي; born 1 January 2009) is a Saudi Arabian footballer who plays as a Winger for Saudi Women's Premier League club Al-Hilal.

== Club career ==
In November 2024, Al-Nassr signed Mawadah Al-Maghrabi from the Golden Eagles, to participate with them in the second edition of the 2024–25 Saudi Women's U-17 Tournament, and she won second place and the silver medal with them.

In April 2025, after concluding her participation in the 2024–25 Saudi Women's U-17 Tournament, Al-Maghrabi joined Al-Nassr's Under-15 team and participated with them in the first edition of the Saudi Girls' U-15 Tournament as team captain, winning the championship title for the Riyadh Region.

In addition to her participation with the under-17 team in the first edition of the 2025–26 Saudi Girls' U-17 Premier League, Al-Maghrabi was able to play her first match in the 2025–26 Saudi Women's Premier League on 13 November 2025 with Al-Nassr against Neom, when she participated as a substitute player in the 88th minute of the second half.

In the summer of 2026, Al-Maghrabi decided to leave Al-Nassr and move to Al-Hilal, joining them for the 2026–27 Saudi Girls' U-17 Premier League.

== International career ==
On 17 January 2024, Mawadah Al-Maghrabi joined the Saudi Arabia U17 team in a training camp in Jeddah with Croatian coach Stella Gotal.

In August 2025, Al-Maghrabi was with the Saudi Arabia u-20 women's national football team in its first participation in the 2026 AFC U-20 Women's Asian Cup qualification.

In October 2025, after participating with the Saudi Arabia u-20 women's national football team in the 2026 AFC U-20 Women's Asian Cup qualification, Al-Maghrabi was with the Saudi Arabia U17 in its first participation in the 2026 AFC U-17 Women's Asian Cup qualification as the team captain.

== Honours ==
=== Al-Nassr ===
- Saudi Women's U-17 Tournament

(silver) second place: 2024–25

- Saudi Girls' U-15 Tournament

(gold) champion: 2025
