= Rand Al-Zahrani =

Saudi footballer (born 2009)

Personal information
- Full name: Rand Rshad Al-Zahrani
- Date of birth: 23 June 2009 (age 17)
- Place of birth: Saudi Arabia
- Positions: Midfielder; winger

Team information
- Current team: Al Qadsiah

Senior career*
Years	Team	Apps	(Gls)
2023–	Al Qadsiah		

International career
2023–2025	Saudi Arabia U17		
2025–	Saudi Arabia U20		
- * Club domestic league appearances and goals

Rand Rshad Al-Zahrani (Arabic: رند رشاد الزهراني; born 23 June 2009) is a Saudi Arabian footballer who plays as a midfielder or winger for Saudi Women's Premier League club Al Qadsiah.

== Club career ==
Rand Al-Zahrani started playing with Al Qadsiah in the first edition of the 2023–24 Saudi Women's U-17 Tournament, reaching fourth place with them.

Al-Zahrani returned to participate with Al Qadsiah in the second edition of the 2024–25 Saudi Women's U-17 Tournament and won the title with them.

In April 2025, after concluding her participation in the 2024–25 Saudi Women's U-17 Tournament, Al-Zahrani joined Al Qadsiah's Under-15 team and participated with them in the first edition of the Saudi Girls' U-15 Tournament as team captain, winning the championship title for the Eastern Region.

== International career ==
In February 2023, Al-Zahrani was selected for the inaugural under-17 team to face Kuwait in double friendly matches.

In February 2025, Al-Zahrani participated with Saudi Arabia under-17 in the 2025 WAFF U-17 Girls Championship in Khobar.

On 15 November 2025, Al-Zahrani joined the Saudi Arabia u-20 women's national football team in a training camp in Taif.

== Honours ==
=== Al Qadsiah ===
- Saudi Women's U-17 Tournament

(gold) champion: 2024–25

- Saudi Girls' U-15 Tournament

(gold) champion: 2025
