= Munirah Al-Ghanam =

Saudi footballer (born 2007)

Personal information
- Full name: Munirah Al-Ghanam
- Date of birth: 25 August 2007 (age 19)
- Place of birth: Saudi Arabia
- Position: Defender

Team information
- Current team: Al Qadsiah FC
- Number: 12

Senior career*
Years	Team	Apps	(Gls)
2022–2023	Eastern Flames FC		
2024–	Al Qadsiah FC		

International career
2023	Saudi Arabia U17		
2024–	Saudi Arabia U20		
- * Club domestic league appearances and goals

Munirah Al-Ghanam (Arabic: منيرة الغنام; born 25 August 2007) is a Saudi footballer who plays as a defender for Saudi Women's Premier League and Saudi Arabia U20.

== Club career ==
Al-Ghanam started playing with Eastern Flames in the 2022/23 season of the Saudi Women's Premier League.

In August 2023, Al-Ghanam was sent to IMG Academy in the United States by the Saudi Arabian Football Federation.

On 31 July 2024, Al Qadsiah FC announced the signing of Al-Ghanam with a contract extending until 2026.

In addition to her participation with Al Qadsiah FC in the 2024–25 Saudi Women's Premier League, Al-Ghanam participated with the under-17 team in the 2024–25 Saudi Women's U-17 Tournament, winning the title with them.

== International career ==
In February 2023, Al-Ghanam was selected for the inaugural under-17 team to face Kuwait in double friendly matches.

In March 2023, with the under-20 team, head coach Pauline Hamill selected Al-Ghanam to play against Mauritania in double friendly matches, achieving their first international victory (3–0) in Jeddah.

== Honours ==
=== Club ===
Al Qadsiah FC

- Saudi Women's U-17 Tournament

(gold) Champion: 2024–25
