= 2025–26 Saudi Girls' U-17 Premier League =

Saudi Girls' U-17 Premier League
- Season: 2025–26
- Dates: 23 October 2025 – 1 May 2026
- Champions: Al-Hilal
- Relegated: Eastern Flames
- Matches: 42
- Goals: 145 (3.45 per match)
- Best Player: Dima Hijazi (ITI)
- Top goalscorer: Danah Al-Dhuhiyan (25 goals)
- Best goalkeeper: Dana Al-Binali (HIL)
- Biggest home win: Al-Hilal 13–0 Al-Nassr (31 October 2025)
- Biggest away win: Eastern Flames 0–5 Al-Ittihad (23 October 2025); Eastern Flames 0–5 Al-Qadsiah (7 November 2025); Al-Ittihad 0–5 Al-Hilal (19 December 2025); Al-Ahli 0–5 Al-Hilal (23 January 2026)
- Highest scoring: Al-Hilal 13–0 Al-Nassr (31 October 2025)
- Longest winning run: 10 matches Al-Hilal
- Longest unbeaten run: 12 matches Al-Hilal
- Longest winless run: 10 matches Al-Ula
- Longest losing run: 4 matches Al-Ula; Al-Ahli; Eastern Flames

The 2025–26 Saudi Girls' U-17 Premier League, is the first season of the Saudi Girls' U-17 Premier League, the top-level Saudi Girls' youth football competitions in Saudi Arabia.

== Teams ==
The teams participating in the first edition of the Saudi Premier League for Girls 2025/2026 were determined by qualifying for the quarter-finals of the second edition of the 2024–25 Saudi Women's U-17 Tournament. These teams are Al-Qadsiah, Al-Nassr, Al-Ahli, Eastern Flames, Al-Ula, Al-Hilal, and Al-Ittihad. Al-Shabab withdrew from the league, leaving only seven teams participating.

Locations of the 2025–26 Saudi Girls' U-17 Premier League teams

Team	Location	Ground	Capacity	2024–25 Season
Al-Ahli	Jeddah	Al-Ahli Club Stadium	10,000	4th
Al-Hilal	Riyadh	Inaya Medical Colleges Stadium	2,000	6th
Al-Ittihad	Jeddah	Al-Ittihad Club Stadium	15,000	5th
Al-Nassr	Riyadh	Al-Nassr Club Stadium	10,000	2nd
Al-Qadsiah	Khobar	Prince Saud bin Jalawi Sports City	11,000	1st
Al-Ula	Medina	Prince Mohammed Bin Abdulaziz Sports City	24,000	8th
Eastern Flames	Dammam	Prince Saud bin Jalawi Sports City; Al-Safa Club Stadium	11,000; 3,500	7th

=== managers and captains ===
Team	Manager	Captain
Al-Ahli	(Serbia) Dragan Vukovic	(Saudi Arabia) Lareen Basyoni
Al-Hilal	(Saudi Arabia) Naif Al-Sahabi	(Saudi Arabia) Hala Al-Shudukhi
Al-Ittihad	(Spain) Alex Piache	(Saudi Arabia) Diyala Soruji
Al-Nassr	(Italy) Loris Salvatori	(Saudi Arabia) Mawadah Al-Maghrabi
Al-Qadsiah	(Brazil) Wilson Mariz	(Saudi Arabia) Madhawi Al-Otaibi
Al-Ula	(Saudi Arabia) Nada Abdullah	(Saudi Arabia) Lara Al-Nassr
Eastern Flames	(Saudi Arabia) Salih Abdullah	(Saudi Arabia) Salma Al-Zubaidi

== League table ==
Pos	Team	Pld	W	D	L	GF	GA	GD	Pts	Relegation
1	Al-Hilal (C)	12	10	2	0	55	3	+52	32	
2	Al-Ittihad	12	6	4	2	27	14	+13	22	
3	Al-Qadsiah	12	6	3	3	19	10	+9	21	
4	Al-Nassr	12	6	2	4	22	30	−8	20	
5	Al-Ahli	12	2	2	8	9	26	−17	8	
6	Al-Ula	12	1	4	7	9	25	−16	7	
7	Eastern Flames	12	1	3	8	4	37	−33	6	Relegation to the 2026–27 First Division League

Source: SAFF
Rules for classification: 1) Points; 2) Goal difference; 3) Number of goals scored.
(C) Champions

== Results ==
The season's match schedule was announced in October 2025.

Home \ Away	QDS	NAS	AHL	ITH	HIL	EFL	ULA
Al-Qadsiah		1–1	3–0	1–1	0–2	5–0	1–0
Al-Nassr	0–0		3–2	1–3	1–2	3–1	5–4
Al-Ahli	0–2	1–2		1–1	0–5	2–1	1–0
Al-Ittihad	3–0	2–1	4–1		1–1	0–1	6–1
Al-Hilal	3–0	13–0	3–0	5–0		11–0	1–1
Eastern Flames	0–5	1–2	0–0	0–5	0–4		0–0
Al-Ula	0–1	0–3	2–1	1–1	0–5	0–0	

Source: SAFF
Legend: Blue = home team win; Yellow = draw; Red = away team win.

== Season statistics ==
=== Scoring ===
- First goal of the season:
  - (Saudi Arabia) Hiba Ouhachi (Al-Ittihad) against Eastern Flames (23 October 2025)
- Last goal of the season:
  - (Sudan) Sadeyah Hassan (Al-Nassr) against Al-Ahli (1 May 2026)

=== Top scorers ===
Rank	Player	Club	Goals
1	(Saudi Arabia) Danah Al-Dhuhiyan	Al-Hilal	25
2	(Saudi Arabia) Lamar Abousamra	Al-Hilal	11
3	(Saudi Arabia) Retaj Al-Thobaiti	Al-Ittihad	9
4	(Saudi Arabia) Hiba Ouhachi	Al-Ittihad	7
5	(France) Asma Azis	Al-Ula	6
5	(Sudan) Sadeyah Hassan	Al-Nassr	6
7	(Saudi Arabia) Lulu Al-Jawini	Al-Hilal	5
8	(Saudi Arabia) Lamar Balkhudher	Al-Ittihad	4
8	(Saudi Arabia) Sana Hawara	Al-Ahli	4
8	(Saudi Arabia) Kenzy El-Sadany	Al-Hilal	4
8	(Saudi Arabia) Lamees Al-Namnkani	Al-Nassr	4
8	(Saudi Arabia) Mawadah Al-Maghrabi	Al-Nassr	4

=== Clean sheets ===
As of 25 April 2026

Rank	Player	Club	Clean sheets
1	(Saudi Arabia) Jood Al-Saqer	Al-Qadsiah	7
1	(Saudi Arabia) Dana Al-Binali	Al-Hilal	7
3	(Saudi Arabia) Sara Al-karri	Eastern Flames	4
4	(Saudi Arabia) Fajar Sakkaf	Al-Hilal	2
4	(Saudi Arabia) Sarah Al-Reahili	Al-Ula	2
4	(Saudi Arabia) Dima Shaikh	Al-Ahli	2
7	(Saudi Arabia) Sarah Barnawi	Al-Ittihad	1
7	(Saudi Arabia) Mariam Al-Tayar	Al-Ittihad	1
7	(Saudi Arabia) Aljoharah Al-Tamimi	Al-Nassr	1
7	(Saudi Arabia) Dona Al-Fayez	Al-Nassr	1

=== Hat-tricks ===
Player	For	Against	Result	Date	Ref.
(Saudi Arabia) Hiba Ouhachi	Al-Ittihad	Eastern Flames	5–0 (A)	23 October 2025	
(Saudi Arabia) Danah Al-Dhuhiyan	Al-Hilal	Al-Nassr	13–0 (H)	31 October 2025	
(Saudi Arabia) Lamar Abousamra	Al-Hilal	Al-Nassr	13–0 (H)	31 October 2025	
(Saudi Arabia) Danah Al-Dhuhiyan	Al-Hilal	Al-Ittihad	5–0 (H)	19 December 2025	
(Saudi Arabia) Danah Al-Dhuhiyan	Al-Hilal	Al-Ula	5–0 (A)	26 December 2025	
(Saudi Arabia) Layan Al-Yafei	Al-Ittihad	Al-Qadsiah	3–0 (H)	26 December 2025	
(Saudi Arabia) Retaj Al-Thobaiti	Al-Ittihad	Al-Al-Ula	6–1 (H)	28 February 2026	
(Saudi Arabia) Danah Al-Dhuhiyan	Al-Hilal	Eastern Flames	11–0 (H)	27 March 2026	
(Saudi Arabia) Lamar Abousamra	Al-Hilal	Eastern Flames	11–0 (H)	27 March 2026	
(Saudi Arabia) Lulu Al-Jawini	Al-Hilal	Eastern Flames	11–0 (H)	27 March 2026	

== See also ==
- 2025–26 Saudi Women's Premier League
- 2025–26 Saudi Women's Cup
- 2025–26 Saudi Women's First Division League
- Dawri Madaris
