= Marya Baghaffar =

Saudi footballer (born 2009)

Personal information
- Full name: Marya Khaled Baghaffar
- Date of birth: 11 February 2009 (age 17)
- Place of birth: Saudi Arabia
- Position: Winger

Team information
- Current team: Al-Ittihad
- Number: 13

Senior career*
Years	Team	Apps	(Gls)
2022–2023	Jeddah Pride		
2023–	Al-Ittihad	1	(0)

International career
2023–	Saudi Arabia U17		
2023–	Saudi Arabia U20		
- * Club domestic league appearances and goals

Marya Khaled Baghaffar (Arabic: ماريا خالد باغفار; born 11 February 2009) is a Saudi footballer who plays as a midfielder for Saudi Women's Premier League club Al-Ittihad.

== Club career ==
Baghaffar started playing with Jeddah Pride in the 2022/2023 season of the Saudi Women's First Division League.

In the following season, 2023/2024, she moved to Al-Ittihad in the Saudi Women's Premier League.

Baghaffar participated in the first edition 2023/24 of SAFF Women's U-17 Tournament with RTC Jeddah team (The Regional Training Center - Jeddah) and also as captain of the team.

Marya Baghaffar will miss all 2024/25 season matches due to a ACL injury.

On 13 September 2025, Baghaffar made her debut in the 2025–26 Saudi Women's Premier League as a substitute in the 90+5 minute against Al-Ula.

== International career ==
In February 2023, Baghaffar was selected for the inaugural under-17 team to face Kuwait in double friendly matches With Croatian coach Stella Gotal.

On 27 January 2024, Baghaffar joined the Saudi Arabia u-20 women's national football team with Scottish coach Pauline Hamill.

Spanish coach Lluís Cortés has decided to call up Marya Baghaffar to the Saudi Arabia national team for the Marbella camp in Spain on 22 May 2024.

== Personal life ==
Marya Baghaffar participated with a delegation from the Saudi Arabian Football Federation to present the bid to host the 2026 AFC Women's Asian Cup at the Asian Football Confederation in Malaysia.
