= Norah Al-Dossari =

Saudi footballer (born 2009)

Personal information
- Full name: Norah Hassan Al-Dossari
- Date of birth: 19 March 2009 (age 17)
- Place of birth: Saudi Arabia
- Position: Forward

Team information
- Current team: Al Qadsiah

Senior career*
Years	Team	Apps	(Gls)
2024–2025	Al Fateh		
2025–	Al Qadsiah		

International career
2024–	Saudi Arabia U17		
- * Club domestic league appearances and goals

Norah Hassan Al-Dossari (Arabic: نورة حسن الدوسري; born 19 March 2009) is a Saudi footballer who plays as a Forward for Saudi Women's Premier League club Al Qadsiah.

== Club career ==
Norah Al-Dossari started playing with Al Fateh in the 2024–25 Saudi Women's Second Division League, scoring 4 goals with them.

In the summer of 2025, Al Qadsiah signed Al-Dossari to join their under-17 team and participate with them in the 2025–26 Saudi Girls' U-17 Premier League.

On 7 November 2025, Al-Dossari was able to play her first match with Al Qadsiah in the 2025–26 Saudi Girls' U-17 Premier League against Eastern Flames as a substitute player in the 76th minute of the second half, scoring two goals in the 90th and 90+1 minutes, and her team won with a score of (5–0).

== International career ==
In December 2024, Croatian coach Stella Gotal decided to include Norah Al-Dossari for the first time in the Saudi Arabia under-17 for a training camp in Jeddah to face Tajikistan in two friendly matches.

In February 2025, Al-Dossari participated with Saudi Arabia under-17 in the 2025 WAFF U-17 Girls Championship in Khobar.
