= Suhair Batook =

Saudi footballer (born 2006)

Personal information
- Full name: Suhair Waleed Batook
- Date of birth: 11 June 2006 (age 20)
- Place of birth: Saudi Arabia
- Positions: Midfielder; winger

Team information
- Current team: United Eagles (on loan from Al Qadsiah FC)
- Number: 7

Senior career*
Years	Team	Apps	(Gls)
2022–2024	Eastern Flames FC		
2024–	Al Qadsiah FC		
2025–	→ United Eagles (loan)		

International career
2023–2024	Saudi Arabia U17		
2023–	Saudi Arabia U20		
- * Club domestic league appearances and goals

Suhair Waleed Batook (Arabic: سُهَيْر وَلِيد بَاطُوق; born 11 June 2006) is a Saudi footballer who plays as a midfielder or winger for Saudi Women's Premier League club United Eagles on loan from Al Qadsiah FC .

== Club career ==
Batook started playing with Eastern Flames in the 2022/2023 season of the Saudi Women's Premier League

In addition to her participation with Eastern Flames in the 2023/2024 season of the Saudi Women's Premier League, Batook participated in the girls’ school league known as Dawri Madaris with the Al Bayan Garden National School team (Arabic: مدرسة حديقة البيان الأهلية) and she win the tournament's top scorer award, the prize of which is 10,000 Saudi riyals, after the schools league, she joined the camp for the best 18 players in the 2023 Girls’ School League, which was held in the Spanish capital Madrid on 1 March 2024.

On 28 February 2024, Batook contributed with the U-17 team of Eastern Flames in claiming third place in SAFF Women's U-17 Tournament 2023/2024.

On 22 August 2024, Al Qadsiah FC announced the signing of Batook with a contract extending until 2027.

On 26 September 2025, Al Qadsiah decided to loan Batook to the United Eagles, which participates in the 2025–26 Saudi Women's First Division League.

== International career ==
On February 3, 2023, Batook joined the first roster of the newly founded Saudi Arabia u-17 women's national football team with Croatian coach Stella Gotal, before joining the first roster of the newly founded Saudi Arabia u-20 women's national football team with Scottish coach Pauline Hamill on December 5.

== Honours ==
=== Club ===
Eastern Flames FC

- SAFF Women's U-17 Tournament Third place: 2023–24
