= Saba Al-Yahya =

Saudi footballer (born 2009)

Personal information
- Full name: Saba Khaled Al-Yahya
- Date of birth: 25 January 2009 (age 17)
- Place of birth: Saudi Arabia
- Positions: Midfielder; winger

Team information
- Current team: Al Qadsiah FC
- Number: 21

Senior career*
Years	Team	Apps	(Gls)
2023–2024	Eastern Flames FC		
2024–	Al Qadsiah FC		

International career
2024–	Saudi Arabia U17		
2024–	Saudi Arabia U20		
- * Club domestic league appearances and goals

Saba Khaled Al-Yahya (Arabic: صبا خالد اليحيا; born 25 January 2009) is a Saudi footballer who plays as a midfielder or winger for Saudi Women's Premier League club Al Qadsiah FC.

== Club career ==
On 28 February 2024, Al-Yahya contributed with the U-17 team of Eastern Flames in claiming third place in SAFF Women's U-17 Tournament 2023/2024.

In the 2024/2025 season, Al-Yahya moved to Al Qadsiah FC to play with them in the second edition of the 2024–25 Saudi Women's U-17 Tournament.

In addition to her participation with Al Qadsiah FC in the 2024–25 Saudi Women's Premier League, Saba Al-Yahya participated with the under-17 team in the 2024–25 Saudi Women's U-17 Tournament, winning the title with them.

== International career ==
In April 2024, Al-Yahya was selected for the under-17 team to face Guam in double friendly matches.

On 21 November 2024, Al-Yahya joined the Saudi Arabia U20 to participate in the 2024 WAFF U-18 Girls Championship.

== Honours ==
=== Club ===
Eastern Flames FC

- Saudi Women's U-17 Tournament

(bronze) Third place: 2023–24

Al Qadsiah FC

- Saudi Women's U-17 Tournament

(gold) Champion: 2024–25

== Personal life ==
Her sister, Maram Al-Yahya, plays football in the Saudi Women's Premier League with Al Qadsiah.
