= Retaj Al-Thobaiti =

Saudi footballer (born 2007)

Personal information
- Full name: Retaj Abdullah Al-Thobaiti
- Date of birth: 1 April 2007 (age 19)
- Place of birth: Saudi Arabia
- Position: Midfielder

Team information
- Current team: Al-Ittihad

Senior career*
Years	Team	Apps	(Gls)
2023–2025	Al-Amal		
2025–	Al-Ittihad		

International career
2024	Saudi Arabia U17		
2024–	Saudi Arabia U20		
- * Club domestic league appearances and goals

Retaj Abdullah Al-Thobaiti (Arabic: ريتاج عبدالله الثبيتي; born 1 April 2007) is a Saudi footballer who plays as a midfielder for Saudi Women's Premier League club Al-Ittihad.

== Club career ==
Al-Thobaiti started playing with Al-Amal in the 2023/2024 season of the First Women's, qualifying with them to the Saudi Women's Premier League.

In the following season 2024/2025, Al-Thobaiti played in the Saudi Women's Premier League matches.

In July 2025, Al-Ittihad signed Al-Thobaiti with a contract extending until 2028.

On 3 April 2026, Al-Thobaiti played two matches in one day. The first match was in the 2025–26 Saudi Girls' U-17 Premier League against Al-Nassr, and she managed to score a goal in the 6th minute of the first half. The second match was in the 2025–26 Saudi Women's Premier League against Al-Ahli, where she participated as a substitute player in the 62nd minute of the second half.

== International career ==
In April 2024, Al-Thobaiti was selected for the under-17 team to face Guam in double friendly matches.

On 21 October 2024, Al-Thobaiti joined the Saudi Arabia u-20 women's national football team to play two friendly matches against Tajikistan in Jeddah.

== Honours ==
=== Club ===
Al-Amal SC

- Saudi Women's First Division League Third place: 2023–24
