= Lulu Al-Obaid =

Saudi footballer (born 2004)

Lulu Al Obaid
Personal information
- Full name: Lulu Mazen Al Obaid
- Date of birth: 26 August 2004 (age 22)
- Place of birth: Saudi Arabia
- Position: Midfielder

Team information
- Current team: Al Hilal
- Number: 6

Senior career*
Years	Team	Apps	(Gls)
2023–	Al Hilal		

International career
2024–	Saudi Arabia U20		
- * Club domestic league appearances and goals

Lulu Mazen Al Obaid (Arabic: لُولُو مَازِن الْعُبَيْد; born 26 August 2004) is a Saudi footballer who plays as a midfielder for Saudi Women's Premier League club Al Hilal.

== Club career ==
Al Obaid played with Al Hilal in some matches of the 2023/24 season of the Saudi Women's Premier League

== International career ==
On 6 March 2023, with the under-20 team, head coach Pauline Hamill selected Al Obaid to play against Mauritania in friendly match, she scored the first goal in the 23rd minute of the first half, and her team won (3–0) in Jeddah.
