= Irene Tobar =

Ecuadorian footballer (born 1989)

Personal information
- Full name: Irene Lissette Tobar Mera
- Date of birth: 5 May 1989 (age 37)
- Place of birth: Guayaquil, Ecuador
- Height: 1.66 m (5 ft 5 1/2 in)
- Position: Goalkeeper

Team information
- Current team: Al-Amal
- Number: 1

Senior career*
Years	Team	Apps	(Gls)
2009–2013	Guayas selection	6	(0)
2013–2015	Rocafuerte FC		
2015	7 de Febrero		
2015	Unión Española		
2016	Manchester FC		
2016-2018	Unión Española		
2018-2019	Universidad Católica		
2019-2022	Real Cartagena		
2022-2024	Dragonas IDV		
2024-	Al Amal	7	(0)

International career^{‡}
2015-2021	Ecuador	10	(0)
- * Club domestic league appearances and goals as of 17:09, 22 June 2015 (UTC) ‡ National team caps and goals as of 15:44, 17 June 2015 (UTC)

Irene Tobar (born 5 May 1989) is an Ecuadorian professional footballer who plays for Al-Amal. She was part of the Ecuadorian squad for the 2015 FIFA Women's World Cup.
