= Fajar Sakkaf =

Saudi footballer (born 2008)

Personal information
- Full name: Fajar Mamdoh Sakkaf
- Date of birth: 11 December 2008 (age 17)
- Place of birth: Saudi Arabia
- Position: Goalkeeper

Team information
- Current team: Al Hilal U-17
- Number: 12

Youth career
- 2023–: Al Hilal

Senior career*
Years	Team	Apps	(Gls)
2023–	Al Hilal U-17		

International career
2023–2024	Saudi Arabia U17		
2024–	Saudi Arabia U20		
- * Club domestic league appearances and goals

Fajar Mamdoh Sakkaf (Arabic: فجر ممدوح سقاف; born 11 December 2008) is a Saudi footballer who plays as a Goalkeeper for the Saudi Women's U-17 Tournament side Al Hilal.

== Club career ==
Sakkaf started playing with Al Hilal (under 17) in the first edition of the SAFF Women's U-17 Tournament

Sakkaf contributed to Al Hilal's second-place finish and the silver medal in the 2022-24 Saudi Women's U-17 Tournament, winning the award for best goalkeeper in the tournament.

Fajar Sakkaf continued playing with Al Hilal in the second edition of the 2024–25 Saudi Women's U-17 Tournament, reaching the quarter-finals with them.

== International career ==
In February 2023, Sakkaf was selected for the inaugural under-17 team to face Kuwait in double friendly matches.

On 2 March 2024, Sakkaf joined the Saudi Arabia u-20 women's national football team with Scottish coach Pauline Hamill in preparation for the first international game against Mauritania.

In August 2025, Fajar Sakkaf was with the Saudi Arabia u-20 women's national football team in its first participation in the 2026 AFC U-20 Women's Asian Cup qualification.

== Honours ==
=== Al-Hilal ===
- Saudi Women's U-17 Tournament

(silver) second place: 2023–24

Individual

- Saudi Women's U-17 Tournament Best goalkeeper: 2023–24
