= Maram Al-Yahya =

Saudi footballer (born 2009)

Personal information
- Full name: Maram Khaled Al-Yahya
- Date of birth: 25 January 2009 (age 17)
- Place of birth: Saudi Arabia
- Positions: Midfielder; winger

Team information
- Current team: Al Qadsiah FC
- Number: 14

Senior career*
Years	Team	Apps	(Gls)
2023–2024	Eastern Flames FC		
2024–	Al Qadsiah FC		

International career
2023–	Saudi Arabia U17		
2024–	Saudi Arabia U20		
- * Club domestic league appearances and goals

Maram Khaled Al-Yahya (Arabic: مَرَام خَالِد الْيَحْيَا; born 25 January 2009) is a Saudi footballer who plays as a midfielder or winger for Saudi Women's Premier League club Al Qadsiah FC. She has played for Saudi Arabia's under-17 and under-20 teams.

== Club career ==
Al-Yahya started playing with Eastern Flames in the 2023–24 season of the Saudi Women's Premier League. She scored 19 goals for the club in the 2023–24 U-17 Eastern Region group, where they topped the table on goal difference over Al Qadsiah.

In February 2024, Al-Yahya was part of the Eastern Flames U-17 team that finished third in the SAFF Women's U-17 Tournament 2023–24.

In the 2024–25 season, Al-Yahya, along with her twin sister Saba Al-Yahya, moved to Al Qadsiah to play with them in the 2024–25 Saudi Women's Premier League.

She also played for the club's U-17 team, which won the 2024–25 Saudi Women's U-17 Tournament.

== International career ==
In March 2023, Al-Yahya was named in the squad for the newly formed U-17 team's first training camp abroad, in Kuwait, which included several friendlies.

In October 2024, coach Pauline Hamill named her in the 22-player U-20 squad for a training camp in Jeddah, from 21 to 30 October, which included two friendlies against Tajikistan.

In August 2025, Al-Yahya played in the 2026 AFC U-20 Women's Asian Cup qualification group in Bhutan. In the 2–1 win over Bhutan on 10 August at Changlimithang Stadium, Thimphu, she started the move that led to the 51st-minute equalizer. Saudi Arabia finished third in the group and did not qualify.

In October 2025, at the 2026 AFC U-17 Women's Asian Cup qualification in Al-Khobar, Al-Yahya played against Iran (lost 0–2) and Lebanon (drew 2–2). Then on 17 October 2025, she scored the last goal, in the 90+3rd minute, of an 11–0 win over Kuwait at Prince Saud bin Jalawi Sports City Stadium, securing the U-17 team's first win in Asian qualifying. Saudi Arabia finished third with 4 points.

As of January 2025, Al-Yahya and her twin sister Saba were regulars in the U-17 team under Croatian coach Stella Gotal. Both also played for the U-20 team under Scottish coach Pauline Hamill.

== Honours ==
=== Club ===
Eastern Flames FC

- Saudi Women's U-17 Tournament

(bronze) Third place: 2023–24

Al Qadsiah FC

- Saudi Women's U-17 Tournament

(gold) Champion: 2024–25

== Personal life ==
Her twin sister, Saba Al-Yahya, also plays football for Al Qadsiah.

Al-Yahya has also competed in taekwondo. In the Arab Taekwondo Cup 2022 at Zayed Sports Complex in Fujairah, she won bronze in the junior girls' 44 kg category. Sayidaty described Al-Yahya as the first Saudi junior girl to achieve an international result in taekwondo.
