= Noelia Gil =

Spanish footballer (born 1994)

Personal information
- Full name: Noelia Gil Pérez
- Date of birth: 23 May 1994 (age 32)
- Place of birth: Madrid, Spain
- Height: 1.72 m (5 ft 8 in)
- Position: Goalkeeper

Team information
- Current team: Al Hilal SFC

Senior career*
Years	Team	Apps	(Gls)
2011–2016	Atlético Madrid		
2016–2018	Granadilla	16	(0)
2018–2019	Sevilla	13	(0)
2019–2020	Málaga	21	(0)
2020–2022	Valencia	24	(0)
2022–2023	Alhama	1	(0)
2023–2024	OH Leuven		
2024–2025	Real Betis		
2025–	Al Hilal SFC		

International career
2011	Spain U17		
- * Club domestic league appearances and goals as of 01:05, 1 October 2022 (UTC)

Noelia Gil Pérez (born 23 May 1994) is a Spanish professional footballer who plays as a goalkeeper for Saudi Women's Premier League club Al Hilal SFC.

== Early and personal life ==
Gil was born in the neighbourhood of Carabanchel, Madrid to a working-class family. Her father worked in a printing press and her mother worked as an administrative assistant. The family were Real Madrid supporters. Aside from football, she also participated in swimming and basketball. Gil is an only child.

Gil has a master's degree in teaching from the INEF department of Technical University of Madrid. She also holds qualifications in English.

== Club career ==
Gil started playing in the Primera División with Atlético Madrid. Inclusive of time spent in the youth academy, she spent a total of 15 years at the club.

In January 2018, she joined newly-promoted Sevilla from Granadilla as competition for the goalkeeper position with Pamela Tajonar. In June 2019, after making 10 league appearances for the club, she announced her departure from Sevilla. At the start of the 2019–20 Segunda División season, she joined Málaga. She would spend one season at the club, conceding 21 goals, the fourth best record in the league. In 2020, she transferred from Málaga and Valencia.

On 2 July 2023, Gil announced that she had signed with OH Leuven.

== International career ==
As an under-17 international, Gil won the 2011 UEFA U-17 Women's Championship.
