= Randa Al-Abdulqader =

Saudi footballer (born 2007)

Personal information
- Full name: Randa Hussain Al-Abdulqader
- Date of birth: 8 June 2007 (age 19)
- Place of birth: Saudi Arabia
- Position: Goalkeeper

Team information
- Current team: Al Qadsiah FC
- Number: 84

Senior career*
Years	Team	Apps	(Gls)
2024–	Al Qadsiah FC		

International career
2024–	Saudi Arabia U20		
- * Club domestic league appearances and goals

Randa Hussain Al-Abdulqader (Arabic: رَنْدَا حُسَيْن الْعَبْد الْقَادِر; born 8 June 2007) is a Saudi footballer who plays as a goalkeeper for Saudi Women's Premier League club Al Qadsiah FC.

== Club career ==
Al-Abdulqader participated in the girls’ school league known as Dawri Madaris with the Al Bayan Garden National School team (Arabic: مدرسة حديقة البيان الأهلية) and she win the tournament's Best Goalkeeper award, after the schools league, she joined the camp for the best 18 players in the 2023 Girls’ School League, which was held in the Spanish capital Madrid on 1 March 2024.

On 6 August 2024, Al Qadsiah FC announced the signing of Al-Abdulqader.

== International career ==
On 24 June 2024, Al-Abdulqader participated in a training program for the Saudi Arabian Football Federation in Spain under the supervision of Spanish coach Lluís Cortés.

On 21 November 2024, Al-Abdulqader joined the Saudi Arabia U20 to participate in the 2024 WAFF U-18 Girls Championship.
