= Dominique Randle =

Filipino footballer (born 1994)

Personal information
- Full name: Dominique Jaylin Abrena Randle (Note: This is the full name in her Filipino nationality. The full name in her American nationality, after marriage, is Dominique Jaylin Harris.)
- Birth name: Dominique Jaylin Randle
- Date of birth: December 10, 1994 (age 31)
- Place of birth: Seattle, Washington, U.S.
- Height: 5 ft 6 in (1.68 m)
- Position: Center-back

Team information
- Current team: Al-Amal
- Number: 20

Youth career
- 200?–201?: Skyline Spartans
- Eastside

College career
| Years | Team | Apps | (Gls) |
| 2012–2017 | USC Trojans | 60 | (0) |

Senior career*
| Years | Team | Apps | (Gls) |
| 2023 | Þór/KA | 19 | (1) |
| 2024– | Al-Amal | 6 | (0) |

International career^{‡}
| 2022– | Philippines | 30 | (1) |
Medal record
Women's football
Representing the Philippines
ASEAN Women's Championship
| Winner | 2022 Philippines | Team |
Southeast Asian Games
| Bronze medal – third place | 2021 Vietnam | Team |
- * Club domestic league appearances and goals as of December 20, 2024 ‡ National team caps and goals as of November 1, 2023

Dominique Jaylin Abrena Randle (born December 10, 1994), known in the United States as Dominique Jaylin Harris (née Randle), is a footballer who plays as a center-back for Saudi Women's Premier League club Al-Amal. Born in the United States, she represents the Philippines at international level.

== Early life ==
Randle was born on December 10, 1994, to a Filipino mother, Catherine 'Cathy' (née Abrena), and an African-American father, Ivory Randle III, in Seattle, Washington, United States. She has three siblings: Ivory IV, Brittanee and Kaelani. A native of Sammamish, Washington, she studied at the town's Skyline High School and played for her school's women's football (soccer) team. She also coincidentally played for the US Olympic Development Program and local Washington club Eastside FC.

== College career ==
In 2012, Randle would start attending the University of Southern California and become part of the USC Trojans soccer team. However she would not play on her first year with USC due to being redshirted. She would also not play in 2013 and 2016 due to an injury.

== Club career ==
In March 2022, she was invited to try out for Angel City of the National Women's Soccer League prior to the start of the 2022 season. In February 2023, she joined Þór/KA in Iceland's Besta deild kvenna.

== International career ==
Randle is eligible to play for the Philippines. She would make her debut for the Philippines in their 1–0 win against Thailand at the 2022 AFC Women's Asian Cup.

== Personal life ==
Randle is married to former NFL player DaJohn Harris.

== Career statistics ==
=== International goals ===
Scores and results list the Philippines' goal tally first.

| # | Date | Venue | Opponent | Score | Result | Competition |
|---|---|---|---|---|---|---|
| 1 | April 7, 2022 | Wanderers Football Park, Sydney, Australia | Fiji | 3–0 | 7–2 | Friendly |

== Honours ==
USC Trojans

- NCAA Division I Women's Soccer Championship: 2016

Philippines

- Southeast Asian Games third place: 2021
- ASEAN Women's Championship: 2022
