= Noura Bouaita =

Algerian footballer (born 1993)

Personal information
- Date of birth: 20 April 1993 (age 33)
- Place of birth: Constantine, Algeria
- Position: Defender

Team information
- Current team: Al-Amal
- Number: 4

Senior career*
Years	Team	Apps	(Gls)
2013–2023	FC Constantine		
2023–	Al-Amal	15	(+3)

International career
2013–	Algeria		
- * Club domestic league appearances and goals

Noura Bouaita (Arabic: نورة بوعيطة; born 20 April 1993) is an Algerian professional footballer who plays as a defender for Saudi Women's Premier League club Al-Amal and the Algeria national team.

== Club career ==
In September 2023, after Algerian Coach Fertoul was appointed to lead the Saudi Al-Amal, Bouaita joined the club on a one-season deal. She played a pivotal role in Al-Amal historic promotion to the Saudi Women's Premier League. On 12 August 2024, Al Amal announced the renewal of her contract for another season.

== International career ==
In October 2013, Bouaita got her first call-up to the senior team for a training camp ahead of the 2014 African Women's Championship qualification matches against Morocco.
