= Yasmeen Al-Farhan =

Saudi footballer (born 2005)

Personal information
- Full name: Yasmeen Yarub Al-Farhan
- Date of birth: 30 July 2005 (age 21)
- Place of birth: Saudi Arabia
- Position: Midfielder

Team information
- Current team: Al Qadsiah
- Number: 43

Senior career*
Years	Team	Apps	(Gls)
2021–2023	United Eagles		
2024–	Al Qadsiah		
- * Club domestic league appearances and goals

Yasmeen Al-Farhan (Arabic: ياسمين الفرحان; born 30 July 2005) is a Saudi footballer who plays as a midfielder for Saudi Women's Premier League club Al Qadsiah.

== Club career ==
Al-Farhan played for United Eagles In 2021.

In March 2023, Al-Farhan was selected among the 11 best players from the Girls’ Schools League known as (Dawri Madaris) to participate with them in a training camp held in Barcelona.

In January 2024, Al Qadsiah signed Al-Farhan for the 2023–24 season of the Saudi Women's Premier League.
