= Ghaday Al-Otaibi =

Saudi footballer (born 2011)

Personal information
- Full name: Ghaday Sultan Al-Otaibi
- Date of birth: 22 August 2011 (age 15)
- Place of birth: Saudi Arabia
- Position: Winger

Team information
- Current team: Al-Nassr
- Number: 20

Senior career*
Years	Team	Apps	(Gls)
2023–2024	Al Shabab		
2024–	Al-Nassr		

International career
2025–	Saudi Arabia U15		
2023–	Saudi Arabia U17		
- * Club domestic league appearances and goals

Ghaday Sultan Al-Otaibi (Arabic: غدي سلطان العتيبي; born 22 August 2011) is a Saudi Arabian footballer who plays as a Winger for Saudi Women's Premier League club Al-Nassr.

== Club career ==
Ghaday Al-Otaibi started playing with Al Shabab in the first edition of the 2023–24 Saudi Women's U-17 Tournament, and won the championship with them.

In the following season, Al-Otaibi moved to Al-Nassr to play with them in the second edition of the 2024–25 Saudi Women's U-17 Tournament, where she won the silver medal for second place and received the award for best player in the tournament.

After concluding her participation in the 2024–25 Saudi Women's U-17 Tournament, Al-Otaibi joined Al-Nassr's Under-15 team and participated with them in the first edition of the Saudi Girls' U-15 Tournament, winning the championship title for the Riyadh Region and received the award for Top scorers in the tournament.

In the 2025/2026 season, Ghaday Al-Otaibi participated with the under-17 team in the first edition of the 2025–26 Saudi Girls' U-17 Premier League, and also participated with the under-15 team as captain in the second edition of the Saudi Girls' U-15 Tournament, winning the Riyadh region title with them and receiving the Best Player award.

== International career ==
In February 2023, Ghaday Al-Otaibi was selected for the inaugural under-17 team to face Kuwait in double friendly matches With Croatian coach Stella Gotal.

In December 2025, Al-Otaibi joined the Saudi Arabia U15, which was founded for the first time with Lebanese coach Sahar Dbouk, and participated for the first time in the 2025 WAFF U-14 Girls Championship. She became the first Saudi player to score in the Championship against Iraq at King Abdulaziz University Stadium in Jeddah.

== Honours ==
=== Al-Shabab ===
- Saudi Women's U-17 Tournament

(gold) champion: 2024–25

=== Al-Nassr ===
- Saudi Women's U-17 Tournament

(silver) second place: 2024–25

- Saudi Girls' U-15 Tournament

(gold) champion: 2025 , 2025–26

Individual

- Saudi Women's U-17 Tournament best player: 2024–25
- Saudi Girls' U-15 Tournament Top scorers: 2025

best player: 2025–26
