= Elizabeth Carabalí =

Colombian footballer (born 2001)

Personal information
- Full name: Elizabeth Carabalí Rodríguez
- Date of birth: 23 July 2001 (age 25)
- Place of birth: Cali, Colombia
- Height: 1.66 m (5 ft 5 in)
- Positions: Full-back; midfielder

Team information
- Current team: Al Qadsiah
- Number: 5

Senior career*
Years	Team	Apps	(Gls)
2018	Atlas CP		
2019–2021	América de Cali		
2021–2022	Llaneros F.C.	8	(0)
2022–2023	Atlético Nacional	10	(0)
2023	La Equidad	16	(1)
2023–2024	Al Qadsiah	9	(0)
2024–	Famalicão	0	(0)

International career
2017–2018	Colombia U17	1	(0)
2020–2021	Colombia U20	0	(0)
- * Club domestic league appearances and goals as of 20 January 2024

Elizabeth Carabalí Rodríguez (born 23 July 2001) is a Colombian professional footballer who plays as a full-back for Portuguese Campeonato Nacional Feminino club Famalicão. She has also played for the Colombia under-17 national team.

== Early life ==
Carabalí started playing football by joining her cousins' team, which mostly consisted of boys back then. But as time went on, she faced a setback because some didn't allow girls to play. Following this, she spent an additional two years playing with the boys' team before committing to the women's squad.

== Club career ==
On 7 July 2021, Carabalí aged 19 joined Llaneros FC.

In February 2022, it was announced that Carabalí had signed with Atlético Nacional for the 2022 season.

On 22 January 2023, she completed the move from Atlético Nacional to La Equidad for the 2023 season.

In September 2023, Carabalí joined Al Qadsiah from La Equidad on a one-season deal. She made her debut on 11 November 2023, coming as a substitute for Zaneta Wyne in the 64th minute in a scoreless draw with Al-Shabab.

On 12 September 2024, Famalicão announced the signing of Carabalí.

== International career ==
=== Youth ===
Carabalí has represented Colombia at under-17 and under-20 level and was included in Colombia's squad for the 2018 FIFA U-17 Women's World Cup.

== Career statistics ==
=== Club ===
As of match played 20 January 2024

Appearances and goals by club, season and competition
Club	Season	League			Cup		Continental		Other		Total	
Club	Season	Division	Apps	Goals	Apps	Goals	Apps	Goals	Apps	Goals	Apps	Goals
Llaneros F.C.	2021	LIF	8	0	—		—		—		8	0
Llaneros F.C.	Total		8	0	—		—		—		8	0
Atlético Nacional	2022	LIF	10	0	—		—		—		10	0
Atlético Nacional	Total		10	0	—		—		—		10	0
La Equidad	2023	LIF	16	1	—		—		—		16	1
La Equidad	Total		16	1	—		—		—		16	1
Al Qadsiah	2023–24	SWPL	5	0	1	0	—		—		6	0
Al Qadsiah	Total		5	0	1	0	—		—		6	0
Career total			39	1	1	0	—		—		40	1

== Honours ==
=== América de Cali ===
- Liga Femenina Profesional de Fútbol Colombiano: 2019
