= DaJohn Harris =

American football player (born 1989)

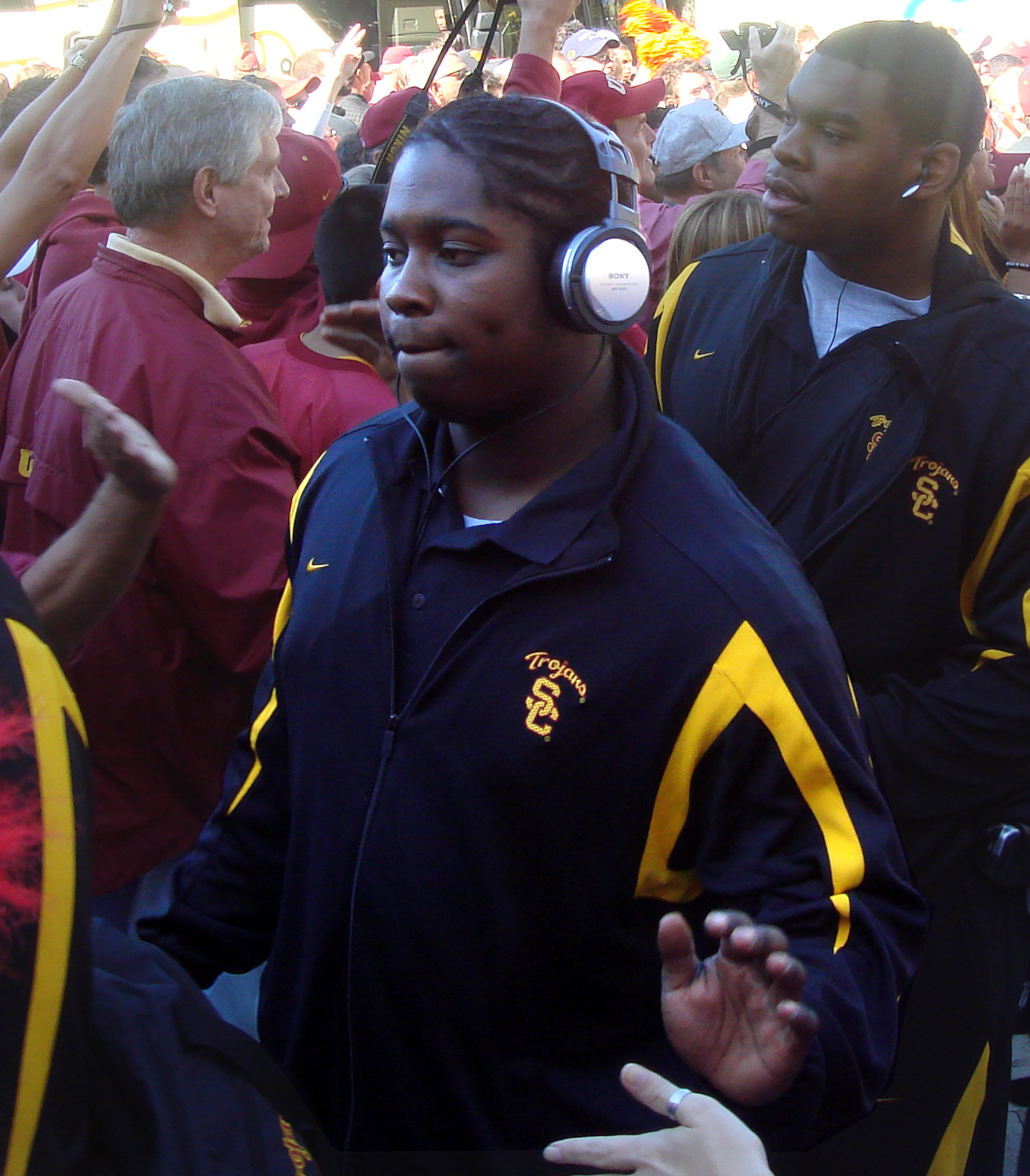
- Harris, during his 2007 freshman season with the Trojans, on the walk into Notre Dame Stadium

No. 62, 96, 93, 16
- Position: Defensive end

Personal information
- Born: January 24, 1989 (age 37); Inglewood, California, U.S.
- Listed height: 6 ft 3 in (1.91 m)
- Listed weight: 306 lb (139 kg)

Career information
- High school: Gardena (CA) Junípero Serra
- College: USC
- NFL draft: 2012: undrafted

Career history
- Tennessee Titans (2012); Washington Redskins (2013)*; Los Angeles KISS (2015)
- * Offseason or practice squad member only

Career NFL statistics
- Total tackles: 3
- Stats at Pro Football Reference

Career AFL statistics
- Total tackles: 1
- Stats at ArenaFan.com

DaJohn Harris (born January 24, 1989) is an American former professional football player who was a defensive end in the National Football League (NFL). He played college football for the USC Trojans.

== College career ==
Harris attended University of Southern California from 2007 to 2011. Harris was a member of Sigma Chi Fraternity, Alpha Upsilon Chapter.

== Professional career ==
=== Tennessee Titans ===
Additional information needed

Harris was signed as an undrafted free agent by the Titans. He was released on August 30, 2013.

=== Washington Redskins ===
Harris was signed to the practice squad of the Washington Redskins on December 3, 2013.

=== Los Angeles KISS ===
On May 28, 2015, Harris was assigned to the Los Angeles KISS of the Arena Football League.

== Personal life ==
Harris is married to soccer player Dominique Randle, a member of the Philippines women's national team.
