= Layan Al-Yafei =

Saudi footballer (born 2008)

Personal information
- Full name: Layan Ameer Al-Yafei
- Date of birth: 24 May 2008 (age 18)
- Place of birth: Saudi Arabia
- Position: Midfielder

Team information
- Current team: Al-Ittihad
- Number: 90

Senior career*
Years	Team	Apps	(Gls)
2022–2023	Jeddah Pride		
2023–	Al-Ittihad	1	(0)

International career
2023–	Saudi Arabia U17		
2023–	Saudi Arabia U20		
- * Club domestic league appearances and goals

Layan Ameer Al-Yafei (Arabic: لَيَان أَمِير الْيَافِعِيّ; born 24 May 2008) is a Saudi footballer who plays as a midfielder for Saudi Women's Premier League club Al-Ittihad.

== Club career ==
Al-Yafei started playing with Jeddah Pride in the 2022/2023 season of the Saudi Women's First Division League.

In the following season, 2023/2024, she moved to Al-Ittihad in the Saudi Women's Premier League. She participated in the Jordanian-Saudi Women's Clubs Championship.

Al-Yafei participated in the first edition 2023/24 of SAFF Women's U-17 Tournament with RTC Jeddah team (The Regional Training Center - Jeddah).

== International career ==
In February 2023, Al-Yafei was selected for the inaugural under-17 team to face Kuwait in double friendly matches. contributing to her team's first victory (3–2) by scoring the first goal in the 12th minute of the first half at Jaber Al-Ahmad International Stadium in Kuwait City.

On December 5, 2023, Al-Yafei joined the first roster of the newly founded Saudi Arabia u-20 women's national football team with Scottish coach Pauline Hamill
