= Luís Andrade =

Portuguese football manager and former player

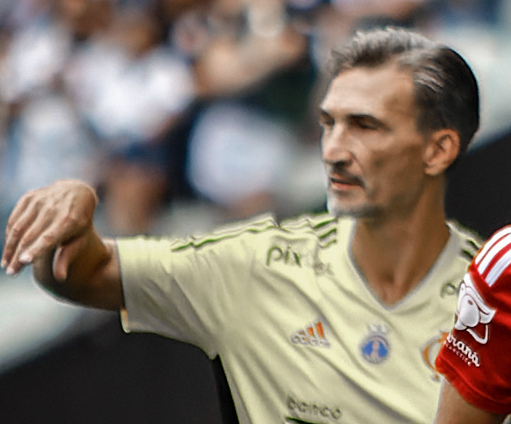
- Andrade with Flamengo (women) in 2023

Personal information
- Full name: Luís Filipe Andrade de Oliveira
- Date of birth: 30 September 1973 (age 53)
- Place of birth: Lisbon, Portugal
- Height: 1.79 m (5 ft 10 in)
- Positions: Defensive midfielder; full-back

Team information
- Current team: Al Hilal (women) (manager)

Youth career
- 1984–1985: Domingos Sávio
- 1985–1992: Sporting CP

Senior career*
Years	Team	Apps	(Gls)
1992–1995	Estoril	68	(1)
1995−1996	Estrela Amadora	26	(0)
1996–1998	Belenenses	49	(1)
1998–2003	Benfica	41	(0)
2000–2001	→ Braga (loan)	29	(0)
2002	Benfica B	1	(0)
2003–2004	Tenerife	22	(0)
2004–2006	Académica	12	(0)
2006	AEP	6	(0)
2007	Pinhalnovense	9	(1)
2007–2008	Olivais Moscavide	19	(0)
2008−2010	Odivelas	39	(2)
2010–2011	Loures		
2012–2013	Odivelas		
Total		321	(6)

International career
1990	Portugal U17	9	(0)
1991	Portugal U18	12	(2)
1993	Portugal U20	2	(1)
1994−1995	Portugal U21	19	(1)

Managerial career
- 2010–2012: Tenente Valdez (youth)
- 2015–2016: Damaiense
- 2016–2017: Alta de Lisboa
- 2017–2018: Atlético Malveira
- 2019–2020: Benfica (women)
- 2022–2023: Flamengo (women)
- 2023–2025: Al Qadsiah (women)
- 2026–: Al Hilal (women)
- * Club domestic league appearances and goals

Luís Filipe Andrade de Oliveira (born 30 September 1973), known as Andrade, is a Portuguese former professional footballer. He is currently manager of Saudi Women's Premier League club Al Hilal.

A gritty player with few skills, he operated mainly as a defensive midfielder but could also play as a full-back.

== Playing career ==
Andrade was born in Lisbon. After playing his youth football at Sporting CP, he went on to represent G.D. Estoril Praia, C.F. Estrela da Amadora, C.F. Os Belenenses, S.L. Benfica (five years, with one season loaned to S.C. Braga), Académica de Coimbra, C.D. Pinhalnovense, C.D. Olivais e Moscavide and Odivelas FC.

Andrade also had abroad spells with CD Tenerife (Spanish Segunda División) and AEP Paphos FC (Cypriot First Division, a few months), and ended his 21-year senior career in the regional championships in 2013, with GS Loures and Odivelas again. He amassed Primeira Liga totals of 193 games and one goal over 12 seasons, and was a member of the Portugal national side that competed at the 1996 Olympic Games, helping them to finish in fourth place.

== Coaching career ==
=== Benfica ===
Andrade started working as a coach in 2010, going on to be in charge of several sides in the Lisbon Football Association. On 2 July 2019, he was named manager of Benfica women's team.

On 26 December 2020, Andrade left his position after only three losses during his spell, two of those being in the round of 32 of the UEFA Champions League against Chelsea.

=== Flamengo ===
On 8 December 2021, Andrade signed with Brazil's Clube de Regatas do Flamengo (women) to become the first foreign head coach in the club's history. In June 2023, his tenure ended following their elimination from the quarter-finals of the Campeonato Brasileiro.

=== Saudi Arabia ===
In September 2023, Andrade became the head coach of Al Qadsiah FC in the Saudi Women's Premier League. On 4 February 2026, he took over Al Hilal SFC in the same competition.

== Honours ==
=== Manager ===
Benfica

- Supertaça de Portugal Feminina: 2019
