= 2026 AFC Women's Asian Cup bids =

The bidding process for the 2026 AFC Women's Asian Cup was the process by which the location for the 21st AFC Women's Asian Cup was selected.

== Hosting requirements ==
The following four football associations submitted their interest to host the tournament by the 31 July 2022 deadline.

The tournament is expected to continue the format of the 2022 AFC Women's Asian Cup edition, with a total of 27 matches taking place, with 12 teams competing in the tournament.

== Confirmed bid ==
=== Australia ===
Football Australia officially submitted the bid to host the 2026 AFC Women's Asian Cup. Australia previously hosted the 2006 AFC Women's Asian Cup, which was the first major Asian tournament staged in the country following its ascension to the AFC. Australia also co-hosted the 2023 FIFA Women's World Cup with New Zealand, the first major Women's World Cup to be staged in two countries. Outside two major tournaments, Australia also hosted the 1981 and 1993 U-20 World Cups, as well as the 2015 AFC Asian Cup.

Australia was selected as the host nation by the AFC Women's Football Committee on 15 March 2024.

== Withdrawn bids ==
=== Saudi Arabia ===
Saudi Arabian Football Federation officially submitted its interests in hosting the competition. Unlike the three other bidders, Saudi Arabia's bid was seen as a surprise, with its women's team just only being recently created, as well as the country having never even competed in a regular competitive Women's Asian Cup qualification. Though never hosting any previous women's competition, Saudi Arabia hosted the FIFA Confederations Cup from 2001 to 2021, as well as the 1989 FIFA World Youth Championship. On 2 December 2022, the Saudi delegation submitted its bid to host the 2026 edition. On 23 February 2024, Saudi Arabia withdrew their bid.

Saudi Arabia's bid was controversial, due to the status of women's rights in the country; there were accusations of Saudis using the bid in an attempt to improve the country's image.

=== Jordan ===
Jordan Football Association announced it had submitted the bid to host the competition. Jordan recently hosted the 2018 AFC Women's Asian Cup, which was the first Women's Asian Cup staged in West Asia. Jordan also hosted the 2016 FIFA U-17 Women's World Cup, which was also the first in a West Asian and Arab country.

=== Uzbekistan ===
Uzbekistan Football Association officially announced its submission to bid the tournament. Uzbekistan never hosted any major senior tournament in either gender, but it hosted various Asian youth tournaments, notably the 2008 and 2010 AFC U-16 Championships, the 2022 AFC U-23 Asian Cup and the 2023 AFC U-20 Asian Cup. On 23 February 2024, Uzbekistan also withdrew their bid. On 15 March, the AFC ultimately selected Uzbekistan as 2029 AFC Women's Asian Cup host and the only bidder.
