= Danah Al-Dhuhiyan =

Saudi footballer (born 2010)

Personal information
- Full name: Danah Abdulaziz Al-Dhuhiyan
- Date of birth: 1 January 2010 (age 16)
- Place of birth: Saudi Arabia
- Position: Forward

Team information
- Current team: Al Hilal
- Number: 29

Senior career*
Years	Team	Apps	(Gls)
2024–2025	Al Shabab		
2025–	Al Hilal		

International career
2025–	Saudi Arabia U17		
2025–	Saudi Arabia U20		
- * Club domestic league appearances and goals

Danah Abdulaziz Al-Dhuhiyan (Arabic: دانة عبدالعزيز الضحيان; born 1 January 2010) is a Saudi Arabian footballer who plays as a forward for Saudi Women's Premier League club Al Hilal.

== Club career ==
Al-Dhuhiyan started playing with Al Shabab in the 2024–25 Saudi Women's U-17 Tournament, helping the team finish in third place and placing second in the top scorers list with 18 goals.

In 2025, Al-Dhuhiyan moved to Al Hilal for the first edition of the 2025–26 Saudi Girls' U-17 Premier League.

On 4 December 2025, Al-Dhuhiyan made her first appearance with Al Hilal's first team in the 2025–26 Saudi Women's Premier League when she was on the bench against Eastern Flames.

== International career ==
In February 2025, Al-Dhuhiyan participated with Saudi Arabia under-17 in the 2025 WAFF U-17 Girls Championship in Khobar.

In August 2025, Al-Dhuhiyan was with the Saudi Arabia u-20 women's national football team in its first participation in the 2026 AFC U-20 Women's Asian Cup qualification.

In October 2025, after participating with the Saudi Arabia u-20 women's national football team in the 2026 AFC U-20 Women's Asian Cup qualification, Al-Dhuhiyan was with the Saudi Arabia U17 in its first participation in the 2026 AFC U-17 Women's Asian Cup qualification, she scored 6 goals, two goals against Lebanon, which ended in a draw (2-2), and four goals against Kuwait, which ended in a Saudi victory (11-0).

== Honours ==
=== Al Shabab ===
- Saudi Women's U-17 Tournament

(bronze) third place: 2024–25
