= Manchester F.C. =

Manchester F.C. may refer to one of the following football teams:

England

- Manchester City F.C., of the Premier League
- Manchester United F.C., of the Premier League
- Manchester Central F.C., operated from 1928 into the 1930s; now the name of an unrelated amateur club
- F.C. United of Manchester, a semi-professional team

Other locations

- Manchester 62 F.C., in Gibraltar
- Manchester Congo Mouilla, in the Republic of the Congo

See also

- Manchester Rugby Club, originally known as Manchester Football Club, in England
