= Dawri Madaris =

Women's football tournament in Saudi Arabia

- Founded: 2022; 4 years ago
- Region: Saudi Arabia
- Teams: 5700 (2023)
- Current champions: Al Tarbiyah Private Schools (1st title)
- Most championships: Al Tarbiyah Private Schools (1 title)
- Website: Dawri Madaris Tournament
- 2023 Dawri Madaris

The Dawri Madaris (Arabic: دوري المدارس) It is a women's football Tournament in schools that is held annually in all regions of Saudi Arabia, organized by the Ministry of Sports in cooperation with the Ministry of Education.

The first edition in 2022 witnessed the participation of 4,768 teams from 1,906 schools, the participation of 48,324 female players with 3,793 female coaches, and the participation of 413 referees.

In the second edition in 2023, more than 5,700 teams were allowed to participate, bringing the number of female players to more than 70,000.

The Dawri Madaris contributed to the discovery of many talented Saudi players who now play for clubs in the Saudi Women's Premier League and the Saudi Women's First Division League.

== Winners ==
Edition	Year	Final		
Edition	Year	Champions	Score	Runners-up
1	2022	Dar Al-Hanan School	2–1	Fourth Secondary School
2	2023	Al-Tarbiyah School	2–2 (a.e.t.) (4–3 p)	Bayan Gardens School
–	2024	Not held		
–	2025	Not held		
3	2026	Al-Tarbiyah Namouthajiyah	10–1	Sixty-Third School

== Individual awards ==
Season	Best Player	Top scorers	Best Goalkeeper
2022	Madawi Al-Aid	Lana Abdulrazak	Shdo Al-Ghamdi
2023	Sarah Al-Zamil	Suhair Batook and Kholoud Kaabi	Randa Abdulqader
2024 Not held
2025 Not held
2026	Ghazal Al-Juhani	Sadeyah Hassan	Aljoharah Al-Tamimi

== Selection of players for the camp ==
At each end of the Dawri Madaris Edition, the league administration selects the best female players to participate in a camp in Europe in order to develop their performance after their brilliance in the Dawri Madaris.

Edition	Year	Players	Camp	Duration of camp
1	2022	Najed Al-Otaibi, Shahad Al-Mashal, Lana Abdulrazak, Haifa Al-Olayan, Reem Qabbani, Shaikha Al-Asiri, Razan Ahmad, Yasmeen Al-Farhan, Shawq Al-hasan, Jumana Al-Ghalib and Yara Felemban	Barcelona	11 to 21 March 2023
2	2023	Suhair Batook, Robin Bassiouni, Razin Al-Shamrani, Isal Ibrahim, Fajr Al-Anzi, Israa Al-Awami, Randa Abdulqader, Maryam Al Ansari, Shawq Al-Zahrani, Wad Al-Salami, Lulwa Al-Nimri, Talin Yamani, Lillian Al-Harbi, Retaj Soleimani, Hanen Al-Eid, Lulu Takroni, Rital Al Jaber and Lareen Basyoni	Madrid	29 February to 10 March 2024
	2024 Not held			
	2025 Not held			
3	2026			

== See also ==
- Saudi Women's Premier League
- Saudi Women's First Division League
- SAFF Women's Cup
- SAFF Women's U-17 Tournament
