= 2024–25 Saudi Women's U-17 Tournament =

2024–2025 Saudi Women's U-17 Tournament
Arabic: بطولة الإتحاد السعودي للناشئات تحت 17

Tournament details
- Dates: 8 November 2024 – 4 February 2025
- Teams: 17

Final positions
- Champions: Al-Qadsiah (1st title)
- Runners-up: Al-Nassr
- Third place: Al-Shabab
- Fourth place: Al-Ahli

Tournament statistics
- Matches played: 62
- Goals scored: 390 (6.29 per match)
- Top goal scorer(s): Khulud Khaled (ULA) (20 goals)

Awards
- Best player: Ghaday Al-Otaibi (NSR)
- Best goalkeeper: Joud Al-Saqer (QDS)

The 2024–25 Saudi Women's U-17 Tournament is the second season of the SAFF Women's U-17 Tournament, a women's youth club football competition organised by the Saudi Arabian Football Federation.

Al-Shabab were the title holders, having defeated Al-Hilal 1–0 in the previous edition's final. However, their title defense came to an end in the semi-finals, where they were defeated by the eventual champions, Al-Qadsiah.

== Overview ==
This was the first edition to feature matches played with eleven-a-side. Each team was required to submit a squad of at least 16 and at most 30 players, with those born between 2007 and 2012 eligible to participate.

== Teams ==
A total of 17 teams entered the tournament. They were divided into five groups based on their geographical locations.

Riyadh Group 1
Team	2023–24
Al-Shabab	Champions
Al-Nassr	Group stage
Al-Shoulla	Debut

Riyadh Group 2
Team	2023–24
Al-Hilal	Runners-up
Al-Riyadh	Group stage
Al-Hmmah	Debut
Al-Bayraq	Debut

Jeddah Group 1
Team	2023–24
Al-Ahli	Quarter-finalist
Jeddah	Quarter-finalist
Al-Ula	Debut
Phoenix	Debut

Jeddah Group 2
Team	2023–24
Al-Ittihad	Debut
Abha	Quarter-finalist
Al-Amal	Debut

Eastern Group
Team	2023–24
Al-Qadsiah	Fourth place
Eastern Flames	Third place
Al-Taraji	Group stage

== Group phase ==
=== Riyadh ===
==== First round ====
Group 1

Pos	Team	Pld	W	D	L	GF	GA	GD	Pts	Qualification	SHB	NAS	SHO
1	Al-Shabab	4	4	0	0	32	3	+29	12	Advance to the Second round	—	4–1	13–0
2	Al-Nassr	4	2	0	2	16	7	+9	6	Advance to the Second round	2–3	—	8–0
3	Al-Shoulla	4	0	0	4	0	38	−38	0		0–12	0–5	—

Source: SAFF
Legend: Blue = home team win; Yellow = draw; Red = away team win.
Rules for classification: Tiebreakers

Group 2

Pos	Team	Pld	W	D	L	GF	GA	GD	Pts	Qualification	HIL	HMM	RIY	BYR
1	Al-Hilal	6	6	0	0	52	1	+51	18	Advance to the Second round	—	17–0	7–0	3–0
2	Al-Hmmah	6	3	1	2	17	30	−13	10	Advance to the Second round	1–11	—	6–0	5–1
3	Al-Riyadh	6	1	2	3	5	26	−21	5		0–11	1–1	—	3–0
4	Al-Bayraq	6	0	1	5	2	19	−17	−8		0–3	0–4	1–1	—

Source: SAFF
Legend: Blue = home team win; Yellow = draw; Red = away team win.
Rules for classification: Tiebreakers

==== Second round ====
Pos	Team	Pld	W	D	L	GF	GA	GD	Pts	Qualification	NAS	HIL	SHB	HMM
1	Al-Nassr	3	1	2	0	5	2	+3	5	Advance to Knockout stage	—		1–1	3–0
2	Al-Hilal	3	1	2	0	13	2	+11	5	Advance to Knockout stage	1–1	—		
3	Al-Shabab	3	1	2	0	10	1	+9	5	Advance to Knockout stage		0–0	—	9–0
4	Al-Hmmah	3	0	0	3	1	24	−23	0			1–12		—

Source: SAFF
Legend: Blue = home team win; Yellow = draw; Red = away team win.
Rules for classification: Tiebreakers

=== Jeddah ===
==== First round ====
Group 1

Pos	Team	Pld	W	D	L	GF	GA	GD	Pts	Qualification	AHL	ULA	JED	PHX
1	Al-Ahli	6	6	0	0	54	3	+51	18	Advance to the Second round	—	7–1	8–0	14–0
2	Al-Ula	6	4	0	2	26	11	+15	12	Advance to the Second round	2–3	—	5–0	9–0
3	Jeddah	6	2	0	4	9	31	−22	6		0–12	0–5	—	6–0
4	Phoenix	6	0	0	6	2	46	−44	0		0–10	1–4	1–3	—

Source: SAFF
Legend: Blue = home team win; Yellow = draw; Red = away team win.
Rules for classification: Tiebreakers

Group 2

Pos	Team	Pld	W	D	L	GF	GA	GD	Pts	Qualification	ITI	AML	ABH
1	Al-Ittihad	4	4	0	0	48	2	+46	12	Advance to the Second round	—	21–1	16–0
2	Al-Amal	4	2	0	2	7	24	−17	3	Advance to the Second round	0–3	—	3–0
3	Abha	4	0	0	4	1	30	−29	−6		0–8	0–3	—

Source: SAFF
Legend: Blue = home team win; Yellow = draw; Red = away team win.
Rules for classification: Tiebreakers

==== Second round ====
Pos	Team	Pld	W	D	L	GF	GA	GD	Pts	Qualification	ITI	AHL	ULA	AML
1	Al-Ittihad	3	2	0	1	29	4	+25	6	Advance to Knockout stage	—		3–4	
2	Al-Ahli	3	2	0	1	7	4	+3	6	Advance to Knockout stage	0–4	—		3–0
3	Al-Ula	3	2	0	1	11	7	+4	6	Advance to Knockout stage		0–4	—	7–0
4	Al-Amal	3	0	0	3	0	32	−32	−3		0–22			—

Source: SAFF
Legend: Blue = home team win; Yellow = draw; Red = away team win.
Rules for classification: Tiebreakers

=== Eastern ===
Pos	Team	Pld	W	D	L	GF	GA	GD	Pts	Qualification	QDS	EFL	QDS	EFL	QDS	EFL
1	Al-Qadsiah	6	5	1	0	13	3	+10	16	Advance to Knockout stage	—	3–1	—	2–1	—	0–0
2	Eastern Flames	6	0	1	5	3	13	−10	1	Advance to Knockout stage	0–2	—	1–2	—	0–4	—

Source: SAFF
Legend: Blue = home team win; Yellow = draw; Red = away team win.
Rules for classification: Tiebreakers

== Knockout stage ==
In the knockout stage, a penalty shoot-out was used to decide the winner if necessary (no extra time was played).

Quarter-finals
28 January – Riyadh
Al-Qadsiah	4
Al-Ula	0
28 January – Riyadh
Al-Ittihad	1
Al-Shabab	2
29 January – Riyadh
Al-Ahli	4
Eastern Flames	2
29 January – Riyadh
Al-Nassr	2
Al-Hilal	1

Semi-finals
1 February – Riyadh
Al-Qadsiah	2
Al-Shabab	0
1 February – Riyadh
Al-Ahli	1 (1)
Al-Nassr	1 (3)

Final
Al-Qadsiah	3
Al-Nassr	0
Third place match
Al-Shabab	4
Al-Ahli	0

=== Quarter-finals ===
28 January 2025
15:30

Al-Qadsiah	4–0	Al-Ula
Maria Thomas 29'; Sha'Carri Owens 54'; M. Al-Yahya 70', 77'

Irqah Sports Stadium, Riyadh
28 January 2025
18:30

Al-Ittihad	1–2	Al-Shabab
Al-Omaisi 81'		Kenzy Alaa 44'; Danah Al-Dhuhiyan 72'

Irqah Sports Stadium, Riyadh
29 January 2025
15:30

Al-Ahli	4–2	Eastern Flames
Rubeen Basyouni 45+3' (pen.); Lareen Basyoni 53'; Taleen Al-Yamani 55'; Fajr Abdullatif 75' (o.g.)		Celine Mohanad 45+6'; Joud Agamy 69'

Irqah Sports Stadium, Riyadh
29 January 2025
18:30

Al-Nassr	2–1	Al-Hilal
Fajar Sakkaf 20' (o.g.); Ghadi Al-Otaibi 36'		Remas El Banawany 82'

Irqah Sports Stadium, Riyadh

=== Semi-finals ===
1 February 2025
15:30

Al-Qadsiah	2–0	Al-Shabab
Sha'Carri Owens 32'; Malakut Ali 89'

Irqah Sports Stadium, Riyadh
1 February 2025
18:30

Al-Ahli	1–1	Al-Nassr
Joud Amr 90+3'		Sana Hawwari 8'
Penalties
	1–3

Irqah Sports Stadium, Riyadh

=== Third place match ===
4 February 2025
15:30

Al-Shabab	4–0	Al-Ahli
Danah Al-Dhuhiyan 18', 90+2'; Kenzy Alaa 26'; Lama Al-Shathry 64'

Irqah Sports Stadium, Riyadh

=== Final ===
4 February 2025
19:30

Al-Qadsiah	3–0	Al-Nassr
Sulaf Asseri 37'; Sha'Carri Owens 81'; Zahra Talib 90+2'

Irqah Sports Stadium, Riyadh

== Top scorers ==
As of 1 February 2025

Rank	Player	Club	Goals
1	(Saudi Arabia) Khulud Khaled	Al-Ula	20
2	(Saudi Arabia) Danah Al-Dhuhiyan	Al-Shabab	18
3	(Saudi Arabia) Lamar Balkhudher	Al-Ittihad	16
3	(Saudi Arabia) Kenzy El-Sadany	Al-Shabab	16
5	(Morocco) Hiba Ouhachi	Al-Ittihad	14
6	(Saudi Arabia) Salma Al-Sherebi	Al-Ittihad	13
6	(Saudi Arabia) Lamar Abousamra	Al-Hilal	13
8	(Saudi Arabia) Rafeef Mohammed	Al-Ahli	11
9	(Saudi Arabia) Taleen Al-Yamani	Al-Ahli	10
9	(Saudi Arabia) Siwar Al-Amri	Al Hilal	10
