= Saudi Arabia women's national under-20 football team =

National association football team

Saudi Arabia
- Nickname(s): الصقور الخضر (The Green Falcons) الصقور العربية (The Arabian Falcons)
- Association: Saudi Arabian Football Federation (SAFF)
- Confederation: AFC (Asia)
- Sub-confederation: WAFF (West Asia)
- Head coach: Pauline Hamill
- Home stadium: Various
- FIFA code: KSA
First colours	Second colours

First international
- Saudi Arabia 3–0 Mauritania (Jeddah, Saudi Arabia, 6 March 2024)

Biggest win
- Saudi Arabia 3–0 Mauritania (Jeddah, Saudi Arabia, 6 March 2024)

Biggest defeat
- North Korea 15–0 Saudi Arabia (Thimphu, 6 August 2025)

WAFF U-20 Girls Championship
- Appearances: 1 (first in 2024)
- Best result: 4th place (2024)

The Saudi Arabia U-20 women's national football team represents Saudi Arabia in international women's association football at the under-20 level. The team is governed by the Saudi Arabian Football Federation (SAFF), the governing body for football in Saudi Arabia.

== History ==
In December 2023, the Saudi Arabian Football Federation announced the formation of the women's under-20 national team, following the establishment of the under-17 team and a series of friendly matches. Coached by former Scotland international Pauline Hamill, the team played its first match on 9 March 2024. Saudi Arabia defeated Mauritania 3–0 in that match, securing its first-ever victory.

== Head-to-head record ==
The following table shows Saudi Arabia' all-time official international record per opponent:

Opponent	Pld	W	D	L	GF	GA	GD	W%	Confederation
Bahrain	2	1	1	0	4	3	+1	50	AFC
Bhutan	3	1	0	2	2	9	−7	33.33	AFC
Botswana A	1	0	0	1	0	3	−3	0	CAF
Jordan	3	0	0	3	1	5	−4	0	AFC
Lebanon	2	0	0	2	0	8	−8	0	AFC
Malta	2	0	0	2	0	7	−7	0	UEFA
Mauritania	2	1	1	0	4	1	+3	50	CAF
Nepal	1	0	0	1	0	1	−1	0	AFC
North Korea	1	0	0	1	0	15	−15	0	AFC
Palestine	1	0	0	1	1	2	−1	0	AFC
Tajikistan	2	0	0	2	1	3	−2	0	AFC
Total	20	3	2	15	13	57	−44	15	—

== Results and fixtures ==
Legend

Win Draw Lose Fixture

=== 2026 ===
12 April Friendly	Saudi Arabia	0–3	Botswana A	Taif, Saudi Arabia
18:00 UTC+3		Report	Moloi 55', 86', 89'	Stadium: Reserve Stadium (1) at King Fahd Sports City

3 June Friendly	Malta	4–0	Saudi Arabia	Ta' Qali, Malta
20:00 UTC+2	Cachia 12', 76'; Catania 27', 82'	Report		Stadium: Centenary Stadium

6 June Friendly	Malta	3–0	Saudi Arabia	Ta' Qali, Malta
15:00 UTC+2	Calleja 20'; Cassar 45+2'; Axiak 66'	Report		Stadium: Centenary Stadium

10 October Friendly	Jordan	2–0	Saudi Arabia	Amman, Jordan
18:00 UTC+3	Issa 40'; Al-Rousan 81'	Report		Stadium: Polo Stadium

13 October Friendly	Jordan	1–0	Saudi Arabia	Amman, Jordan
18:00 UTC+3	Salameh 79'	Report		Stadium: Polo Stadium

28 November 2026 WAFF U-20 Girls Championship GS	Saudi Arabia	v	Lebanon	Aqaba, Jordan
20:00 UTC+3				Stadium: Aqaba Stadium

30 November 2026 WAFF U-20 Girls Championship GS	Palestine	v	Saudi Arabia	Aqaba, Jordan
20:00 UTC+3				Stadium: Aqaba Stadium

Source :Women’s National Team U20 Team Participations

== Managerial history ==
- (Scotland) Pauline Hamill (5 December 2023 – 2024)

== Players ==
=== Current squad ===
The following 20 players were selected for the 2024 WAFF U-18 Girls Championship in Aqaba, Jordan, from 28 November to 6 December 2024.

No.	Pos.	Player	Date of birth (age)	Club
1	GK	Louloua Moussa	27 October 2006 (age 20)	(Saudi Arabian Football Federation) Al-Ittihad
21	GK	Fajar Sakkaf		(Saudi Arabian Football Federation) Al Hilal
22	GK	Randa Abdulqader	8 June 2007 (age 19)	(Saudi Arabian Football Federation) Al Qadsiah
2	DF	Fajr Saad	16 April 2007 (age 19)	(Saudi Arabian Football Federation) Eastern Flames
3	DF	Mayan Al-Aqeel	26 June 2006 (age 20)	(Saudi Arabian Football Federation) Al-Riyadh
4	DF	Danah Ahmed		(Saudi Arabian Football Federation) Al-Shabab
5	DF	Majd Al-Otaibi	4 December 2006 (age 19)	(Saudi Arabian Football Federation) Al Hilal
12	DF	Munirah Al-Ghanam	25 August 2007 (age 19)	(Saudi Arabian Football Federation) Al Qadsiah
13	DF	Maya Al-Zahrani	21 October 2008 (age 18)	(Saudi Arabian Football Federation) Al-Ahli
15	DF	Sulaf Asiri	8 June 2007 (age 19)	(Saudi Arabian Football Federation) Al Qadsiah
20	DF	Layan Saleh	16 May 2006 (age 20)	(Saudi Arabian Football Federation) Al-Shabab
6	MF	Lulu Al-Jawini		(Saudi Arabian Football Federation) Al-Shabab
7	MF	Basmah Al-Shnaifi	23 April 2009 (age 17)	(Saudi Arabian Football Federation) Al Nassr
8	MF	Suhair Batook	11 June 2006 (age 20)	(Saudi Arabian Football Federation) Al Qadsiah
10	MF	Layan Al-Yafei	24 May 2008 (age 18)	(Saudi Arabian Football Federation) Al-Ittihad
11	MF	Fatimah Mansour	10 December 2007 (age 18)	(Saudi Arabian Football Federation) Al-Ittihad
14	MF	Maram Al-Yahya	25 January 2009 (age 17)	(Saudi Arabian Football Federation) Al Qadsiah
18	MF	Saba Al-Yahya	25 January 2009 (age 17)	(Saudi Arabian Football Federation) Al Qadsiah
9	FW	Ameera Abualsamh		(Canadian Soccer Association) McMaster Marauders
16	FW	Salma Al-Zubaidi	17 December 2008 (age 17)	(Saudi Arabian Football Federation) Eastern Flames
17	FW	Lamar Mohammad	25 December 2007 (age 18)	(Saudi Arabian Football Federation) Al-Ittihad
19	FW	Retaj Al-Thobaiti	1 April 2007 (age 19)	(Saudi Arabian Football Federation) Al-Amal
23	FW	Yasmine Malabarey		(Saudi Arabian Football Federation) Al Hilal

=== Recent call-ups ===
The following players were also named to a squad in the last 12 months.

Pos.	Player	Date of birth (age)	Caps	Goals	Club	Latest call-up

== See also ==
- Saudi Arabia women's national football team
- Saudi Arabia women's national under-17 football team
