= Al-Amal SC =

Saudi women's association football team

Al-Amal
- Full name: Al-Amal Sports Club
- Founded: 2018; 8 years ago
- President: Amal Al-Toum
- Head coach: Radia Fertoul
- League: Saudi Women's First Division League
- 2024–25: 9th in Saudi Women's Premier League
Home colours	Away colours

Al-Amal Sports Club, (Arabic: نادي الأمل الرياضي لكرة القدم) also known as Al-Amal Football Club, is a Saudi professional women's football club from Taif established in 2018.

== History ==
Founded in 2018, Al-Amal was the first women's club established in Taif.

In 2020, as the team prepared for its participation in the inaugural community competition, trials and registration were announced to offer an opportunity for talent discovery, open to all from this point onward. This initiative comes after the team's prior participation in the Taif University League, where they proudly secured the silver medal.

Al-Amal participated in the first Saudi Women's First Division League, placed in the third group. Despite earning four points from four matches, their performance did not qualify them for the final rounds, resulting in their elimination. Ranked among the top 8 eligible teams in the first division, the team secured qualification for the inaugural SAFF Women's Cup. In this tournament, they faced the tough Saudi powerhouse Al Nassr, who defeated them convincingly with a score of 9–0.

In the 2023–24 season, the team made their second appearance in the First Division League. In anticipation of new challenges, They appointed Algerian Coach Radia Fertoul to lead the team. Additionally, they secured the signings of five Algerian Internationals to strengthen their squad and enhance their chances of securing promotion. Placed in the 5th group, the team secured the top spot by winning 7 out of 8 matches and scoring a total of 73 goals. This triumph earned them qualification for the final stages of the league. Remaining undefeated in the final round's group stage, they progressed to the semi-finals. After a 0–3 defeat against Al-Ula, the team participated in the third-place playoff, emerging victorious and thereby securing their first promotion to the Premier League, to be the first club from Taif to do so.

== Players ==
=== Current squad ===
As of 13 October 2024

Note: Flags indicate national team as defined under FIFA eligibility rules; some limited exceptions apply. Players may hold more than one non-FIFA nationality.

No.	Pos.	Nation	Player
2	DF	KSA	Rula Khabrani
4	DF	ALG	Noura Bouaita
5	DF	KSA	Rahaf Al-Barakati
6	MF	KSA	Tayah Qaisi
7	FW	ALG	Ferial Daoui
8	MF	IND	Kajol D'Souza
9	MF	KSA	Sarah Al-Malki
10	FW	ALG	Imène Merrouche
13	FW	CIV	Stéphanie Gbogou
14	MF	CIV	Mariam Sidibé
15	MF	KSA	Bahiya Eid
16	DF	KSA	Malak Al-Zahrani
18	DF	KSA	Remas Al-Thobaiti

No.	Pos.	Nation	Player
19	GK	KSA	Badriya Al-Judaie
20	DF	PHI	Dominique Randle
24	DF	KSA	Taif Al-Sharif
26	MF	KSA	Fatima Al-Nafie
28	DF	KSA	Raneem Khabarani
29	DF	KSA	Imtenan Al-Ghamdi
30	GK	KSA	Basmah Hasan
47	MF	KSA	Retaj Al-Thobaiti
77	MF	KSA	Renad Al-Sofyani
—	DF	KSA	Raghad Al-Otaibi
—	DF	KSA	Amani Al-Shehri
—	GK	ECU	Irene Tobar

== Current staff ==
As of 13 March 2024.

Position	Name
Head coach	(Algeria) Radia Fertoul
Assistant coach	(Algeria) Hakima Boussetta
Goalkeeper coach	(Algeria) Benaouda Benkherfia
