= Saudi Arabia women's national under-17 football team =

National association football team

Saudi Arabia
- Nickname(s): الصقور الخضر (The Green Falcons) الصقور العربية (The Arabian Falcons)
- Association: Saudi Arabian Football Federation (SAFF)
- Confederation: AFC (Asia)
- Sub-confederation: WAFF (West Asia)
- Head coach: (Greece) Aikaterini Falida
- FIFA code: KSA
First colours	Second colours

First international
- Kuwait 4–1 Saudi Arabia (Kuwait City, Kuwait, 4 March 2023)

Biggest win
- Kuwait 0–11 Saudi Arabia (Khobar, Saudi Arabia, 17 October 2025)

Biggest defeat
- Malaysia 9–0 Saudi Arabia (Kudus, Indonesia, 18 August 2026)

WAFF U-17 Girls Championship
- Appearances: 2 (first in 2025)
- Best result: Group stage (2025, 2026)

The Saudi Arabia women's national under-17 football team represents Saudi Arabia in international women's association football at the under-17 level. The team is governed by the Saudi Arabian Football Federation (SAFF), the governing body for football in Saudi Arabia.

== History ==
In February 2023 the Saudi Arabian Football Federation announced the establishment of the youth women's team after a long period (one year) of selecting from different part of the kingdom local women's league and even the national women's league. The Croatian coach Stella Gotal was selected to lead the first ever game for the national team; on 4 March 2023, Saudi Arabia played and lost their first match against Kuwait U17 team 4–1, away to Kuwait.

== Head-to-head record ==
The following table shows Saudi Arabia' all-time official international record per opponent:

Opponent	Pld	W	D	L	GF	GA	GD	W%	Confederation
Bahrain	4	1	0	3	2	9	−7	25	AFC
Guam	2	0	0	2	1	6	−5	0	AFC
Hong Kong	1	0	0	1	0	7	−7	0	AFC
Indonesia	2	0	0	2	1	10	−9	0	AFC
Iran	1	0	0	1	0	2	−2	0	AFC
Jordan	4	0	0	4	2	15	−13	0	AFC
Kuwait	3	2	0	1	15	6	+9	66.67	AFC
Lebanon	3	0	1	2	2	9	−7	0	AFC
Malaysia	1	0	0	1	0	9	−9	0	AFC
Malta	2	0	0	2	1	12	−11	0	UEFA
Mongolia	2	1	1	0	6	0	+6	50	AFC
Singapore	1	0	0	1	0	1	−1	0	AFC
Syria	3	0	0	3	0	7	−7	0	AFC
Tajikistan	2	0	0	2	0	3	−3	0	AFC
United Arab Emirates	1	1	0	0	5	0	+5	100	AFC
Total	32	5	2	25	35	96	−61	15.625	—

== Results and fixtures ==
The following is a list of match results in the last 12 months, as well as any future matches that have been scheduled.

Legend

Win Draw Lose Fixture

=== 2026 ===
3 June Friendly	Malta	5–1	Saudi Arabia	Ta' Qali, Malta
17:00 UTC+2	Catania 2', 61'; Montebello Caruana 11', 76'; Muscat 53'	Report	Al-Otaibi 34'	Stadium: Centenary Stadium

6 June Friendly	Malta	7–0	Saudi Arabia	Ta' Qali, Malta
18:00 UTC+2	Richard 28'; Mendez Vasquez 36'; Montebello Caruana 47', 54'; Catania 49' (pen.); Jorgenson 77'; Muscat 78'	Report; Report (MFA)		Stadium: Centenary Stadium

17 July 2026 2026 WAFF U-17 GS	Syria	1–0	Saudi Arabia	Zarqa, Jordan
20:00 UTC+3	Mena 66'	Report; Report (WAFF)		Stadium: Prince Mohammed Stadium

19 July 2026 2026 WAFF U-17 GS	Saudi Arabia	0–2	Lebanon	Zarqa, Jordan
20:00 UTC+3		Report; Report (WAFF)	Boustany 3'; Geitani 23'	Stadium: Prince Mohammed Stadium

21 July 2026 2026 WAFF U-17 GS	Saudi Arabia	5–0	United Arab Emirates	Zarqa, Jordan
20:00 UTC+3	Al-Duhiyan 27', 52', 62'; Al-Kaabi 50' (pen.); Al-Suhaymi 72'	Report; Report (WAFF)		Stadium: Prince Mohammed Stadium

14 August 2026 Srikandi Merdeka Cup 2026 GS	Indonesia	7–0	Saudi Arabia	Kudus, Indonesia
16:00 UTC+7	Arabela 5'; Nori 23'; Kayla 37' (pen.), 40'; Nadifa 49'; Fadilla 78'; Hegazy 90' (o.g.)	Report		Stadium: Supersoccer Arena

16 August 2026 Srikandi Merdeka Cup 2026 GS	Saudi Arabia	0–7	Hong Kong	Kudus, Indonesia
11:00 UTC+7		Report		Stadium: Supersoccer Arena

18 August 2026 Srikandi Merdeka Cup 2026 GS	Malaysia	9–0	Saudi Arabia	Kudus, Indonesia
11:00 UTC+7		Report		Stadium: Supersoccer Arena

5 October 2026 2027 Asian Cup qualification	Singapore	1–0	Saudi Arabia	Bishan, Singapore
20:00 UTC+8	Tan 23'	Report		Stadium: Bishan Stadium; Referee: Wang Chieh (Chinese Taipei)

8 October 2026 2027 Asian Cup qualification	Saudi Arabia	1–3	Indonesia	Bishan, Singapore
17:00 UTC+8	Elsadany 70'	Report	Nori 66', 88'; Fadilla 89'	Stadium: Bishan Stadium; Referee: Plong Pich Akara (Cambodia)

11 October 2026 2027 Asian Cup qualification	Saudi Arabia	2–1	Bahrain	Bishan, Singapore
17:00 UTC+8	Al-Sharaf 51'; Al-Otaibi 88'	Report	Mohamed 66'	Stadium: Bishan Stadium; Referee: Mahnaz Zokaee (Iran)

- Women’s National Team U17 (2023)

== Coaching staff ==
=== Current coaching staff ===
As of 13 October 2025

Position	Name
Head coach	(Greece) Aikaterini Falida
Assistant coach	(Saudi Arabia) Najd Al-Mejaish
Assistant coach	(Portugal) Pedro Caravela
Goalkeeping coach	(Spain) Jaime Borrero
Physiotherapist	(Saudi Arabia) Amal Fatil
Fitness Coach	(Italy) Claudio Donatelli
	(Saudi Arabia) Nora Al-Dohan

=== Manager history ===
- (Croatia) Stella Gotal (February 2023 – June 2025)
- (Greece) Aikaterini Falida (July 2023 – present)

== Players ==
=== Current squad ===
The following 23 players were named in the squad for the 2026 AFC U-17 Women's Asian Cup qualification, held from 13 to 17 October 2025 in Khobar.

No.	Pos.	Player	Date of birth (age)	Club
1	GK	Dima Shaikh		(Saudi Arabian Football Federation) Al-Ahli
21	GK	Dana Al-Binali		(Saudi Arabian Football Federation) Al-Hilal
22	GK	Sara Barnawi		(Saudi Arabian Football Federation) Al-Ittihad
2	DF	Aseel Selim		(Saudi Arabian Football Federation) Al-Shabab
3	DF	Arwa Al-Rasheed		(Saudi Arabian Football Federation) Al-Nassr
4	DF	Rital Hakami		(Saudi Arabian Football Federation) Al-Qadsiah
5	DF	Diala Soruji		(Saudi Arabian Football Federation) Al-Ittihad
6	DF	Juwaan Al-Nassar		(Saudi Arabian Football Federation) Al-Qadsiah
12	DF	Mawadah Al-Maghrabi	January 1, 2009 (age 17)	(Saudi Arabian Football Federation) Al-Nassr
15	DF	Siwar Amro		(Saudi Arabian Football Federation) Al-Hilal
7	MF	Basmah Al-Shnaifi	April 23, 2009 (age 17)	(Saudi Arabian Football Federation) Al-Nassr
8	MF	Saba Al-Yahya	January 25, 2009 (age 17)	(Saudi Arabian Football Federation) Al-Qadsiah
10	MF	Ghaday Al-Otaibi	August 22, 2011 (age 15)	(Saudi Arabian Football Federation) Al-Nassr
14	MF	Hala Al-Shudukhi (Captain)		(Saudi Arabian Football Federation) Al-Hilal
18	MF	Reema Abdulaziz		(Saudi Arabian Football Federation) Al-Shabab
20	MF	Lamar Abousamra	October 10, 2009 (age 17)	(Saudi Arabian Football Federation) Al-Hilal
23	MF	Rimas Ahmed		(Saudi Arabian Football Federation) Al-Hilal
9	FW	Danah Al-Dhuhiyan	January 1, 2010 (age 16)	(Saudi Arabian Football Federation) Al-Shabab
11	FW	Maram Al-Yahya	January 25, 2009 (age 17)	(Saudi Arabian Football Federation) Al-Qadsiah
13	FW	Marya Baghaffar	February 11, 2009 (age 17)	(Saudi Arabian Football Federation) Al-Ittihad
16	FW	Yasmine Malabarey		(Saudi Arabian Football Federation) Al-Hilal
17	FW	Zahra Talib		(Saudi Arabian Football Federation) Al-Qadsiah
19	FW	Zainab Rida		(Saudi Arabian Football Federation) Al-Qadsiah

=== Recent call-ups ===
The following players have been called up to the squad in the past 12 months.

Pos.	Player	Date of birth (age)	Caps	Goals	Club	Latest call-up

== Competitive record ==
=== FIFA U-17 Women's World Cup ===
FIFA U-17 Women's World Cup record
Host/Year	Result	Pld	W	D	L	GF	GA
(Dominican Republic) 2024	Did not enter						
(Morocco) 2025	Did not qualify						
(Morocco) 2026	Did not qualify						
(Morocco) 2027	Did not qualify						
(Morocco) 2028	To be determined						
Total	0/2	—	—	—	—	—	—

=== AFC U-17 Women's Asian Cup ===
AFC U-17 Women's Asian Cup record
Host/Year	Result	Pld	W	D	L	GF	GA
(Indonesia) 2024	Did not enter						
(China) 2026	Did not qualify						
(China) 2027	Did not qualify						
(China) 2028	To be determined						
Total	0/1	—	—	—	—	—	—

=== WAFF U-17 Girls Championship ===
WAFF U-17 Girls Championship record
Host/Year	Result	Pld	W	D	L	GF	GA
(Jordan) 2023	Did not enter						
(Saudi Arabia) 2025	Group stage	2	0	0	2	0	4
(Jordan) 2026	Group stage	3	1	0	2	5	3
Total	2/3	5	1	0	4	5	7

== See also ==
- Saudi Arabia women's national football team
- Saudi Arabia women's national under-20 football team
