= Saudi Girls' youth football competitions =

This article details the development and current status of girls' youth football competitions in Saudi Arabia.

== Saudi Girls' U-17 Premier League ==
Saudi Girls' U-17 Premier League
- Organiser(s): Saudi Arabian Football Federation
- Founded: 2023; 3 years ago
- Region: Saudi Arabia
- Teams: 7 (2025–26)
- Current champions: Al-Qadsiah (1st title)
- Most championships: Al-Qadsiah; Al-Shabab (1 title each)
- Broadcaster: SAFF+
- Website: Saudi Women's U-17 Tournament; Saudi Girls' U-17 Premier League
- 2025–26 Saudi Girls' U-17 Premier League

The Saudi Girls' U-17 Premier League (Arabic: الدوري الممتاز للناشئات), founded as the Saudi Women's U-17 Tournament before changing to its current name after the 2024–25 season. It is the main competition for girls under-17 in the Kingdom of Saudi Arabia.

=== History ===
Logo of the league until 2025

Following the growing interest and participation in women's football in Saudi Arabia, the Saudi Arabian Football Federation (SAFF) announced the establishment of the Saudi Women's U-17 Tournament as part of its efforts to develop the women's game in the Kingdom. The competition was created to nurture a new generation of female footballers and to increase the number of official matches available to them, thereby enhancing the technical standards of players.

The inaugural edition included clubs with Under-17 teams as well as three Regional Training Centers (Arabic: مراكز التدريب الإقليمية). Teams were required to register between 14 and 40 players, with eligible ages ranging from 12 to 17 years. Matches were played in a nine-a-side (9v9) format, consisting of two halves of 35 minutes each. Teams were divided into regional groups, with the top two from each group advancing to the knockout stage, which included the quarter-finals, semi-finals, final, and a third-place playoff.

In the second edition, participation was limited to clubs from the Saudi Premier League and First Division. The format was expanded to five groups, and the knockout phase featured 14 qualified teams. Matches were also played under the standard eleven-a-side format, marking a further step toward aligning with international competition standards.

In 2025, the competition was renamed the Saudi Girls' U-17 Premier League and adopted a season-long home-and-away format, featuring seven of the 8 clubs from the 2025–26 Saudi Women's Premier League.

=== Champions ===
Saudi Women's U-17 Tournament

Ed.	Season	Final			Third place match			Venue
Ed.	Season	Champion	Score	Runner-up	Third place	Score	Fourth place	Venue
1	2023–24	Al-Shabab (1)	1–0	Al-Hilal	Eastern Flames	0–0 (4–3 p)	Al-Qadsiah	Noon Academy Stadium, Jeddah
2	2024–25	Al-Qadsiah (1)	3–0	Al-Nassr	Al-Shabab	4–0	Al-Ahli	Irqah Sports Stadium, Riyadh

Saudi Girls' U-17 Premier League

Ed.	Season	Champion	Runner-up	Third place	Fourth place
1	2025–26	Al-Hilal	Al-Ittihad	Al-Qadsiah	Al-Nassr
2	2026–27				

=== Individual awards ===
The following awards are presented at the end of each season:

Season	Best Player	Top scorers	Best Goalkeeper
2023–24	Lulu Al-Jawini (SHB)	Basmah Al-Shnaifi (NSR)	Fajar Sakkaf (HIL)
2024–25	Ghaday Al-Otaibi (NSR)	Khulud Khaled (Al-Ula)	Jood Al-Saqer (Al-Qadsiah)
2025–26	Dima Hijazi (ITI)	Danah Al-Dhuhiyan (HIL)	Dana Al-Binali (HIL)

== Saudi Girls' Cup ==
Saudi Girls' Cup
- Organiser(s): Saudi Arabian Football Federation
- Founded: 2026; 0 years ago
- Region: Saudi Arabia
- Teams: 4 (2026)
- Website: Saudi Girls' Cup

The Saudi Girls' U-17 Cup, officially the SAFF Girls' Cup (Arabic: كأس الاتحاد السعودي للناشئات) is a cup tournament for Girls' youth teams aged 17 and under.

=== History ===
The inaugural edition of the cup competition was announced by the Saudi Arabian Football Federation on 2 May 2026, following the successful launch of the Saudi Women's U-17 Premier League. The new competition features the top four teams from the 2025–26 league season. The competition was played in a knockout format, with the semi-finals contested over two legs, pairing the league champions against the fourth-placed side and the runners-up against the third-placed team. The winners of the semi-finals advanced to a single-match final to determine the champions.

=== Champions ===
Year	Champions	Result	Runners-up
2026	Al-Ittihad	3–2	Al-Hilal

=== Individual awards ===
The following awards are presented at the end of each season:

Season	Best Player	Top scorers		Best Goalkeeper
2026	(Saudi Arabia) Hiba Ouhachi (ITI)	(Saudi Arabia) Lamar Balkhudher (ITI)	5 goals	(Lebanon) Dana Abdulrahman (ITI)

== Saudi Girls' U-15 Tournament ==
Saudi Girls' U-15 Tournament
- Organiser(s): Saudi Arabian Football Federation
- Founded: 28 March 2025; 17 months ago
- Region: Saudi Arabia
- Teams: 14 (2025–26)
- Current champions: Riyadh: Al Nassr (2st title); Jeddah: Al Ittihad (2st title); Eastern Prov.: Al-Qadsiah (2st title)
- Website: Saudi Girls' U-15 Tournament

The Saudi Girls' U-15 Tournament (Arabic: بطولة الإتحاد السعودي للفتيات), is the premier competition for girls aged 15 and under, organized as a regional tournament with each region crowning its own champion.

=== History ===
In late March 2025, the Saudi Arabian Football Federation established the U-15 Girls' Tournament. The competition aims to provide a platform for identifying and developing young talent for national teams, while improving players' technical abilities and skills in a competitive yet supportive environment.

To support player development, the tournament was open to all clubs, academies, and Regional Training Centers across the Kingdom. Teams were required to register between 16 and 30 players, with eligible players aged 11 to 15.

The emergence of the Saudi girl's U-15 Tournament contributed to the establishment of the Saudi Arabia girl's national under-15 football team for the first time on 25 September 2025, under the leadership of Lebanese coach Sahar Dbouk.

=== Champions ===
Ed.	Year	Riyadh Region			Jeddah Region			Eastern Region		
Ed.	Year	Champion	Score	Runner-up	Champion	Score	Runner-up	Champion	Score	Runner-up
1	2025	Al-Nassr (1)	3–0	Al-Hilal	Al-Ittihad (1)	2–2 (4–2 p)	Al-Ula	Al Qadsiah (1)	1–0	Eastern Flames
2	2025–26	Al-Nassr (2)	5–0	Al-Hilal	Al-Ittihad (2)	3–1	RTC Medina	Al Qadsiah (2)	9–1	RTC Dammam

=== Individual awards ===
Season	Top scorers	Best Goalkeeper	Best Player
Jeddah Region
2025	(Morocco) Hiba Ouhachi (ITI)	(Saudi Arabia) Ranse Al-Hejaili (ULA)	(Saudi Arabia) Khulud Binkhutheila (ULA)
2025–26	(Yemen) Joud Salem (ITI)	(Saudi Arabia) Norah Al-Malki (ITI)	(Saudi Arabia) Aref Al-Kareem (RTM)
Eastern Region
2025	(Syria) Ciline Kachkach (EFL)	(Saudi Arabia) Sara Al-Karri (EFL)	(United States) Shakari Owens (QAD)
2025–26	(Palestine) Talia Mahmoud (RTD)	(Saudi Arabia) Al-Jouri Al-Dossary (QAD)	(Saudi Arabia) Hour Al-fared (QAD)
Riyadh Region
2025	(Saudi Arabia) Ghaday Al-Otaibi (NSR)	(Saudi Arabia) Aljoharah Al-Tamimi (NSR)	(Egypt) Lamar Abousamra (HIL)
2025–26	(Sudan) Sadeyah Hassan (NSR)	(Saudi Arabia) Dana Al-Binali (HIL)	(Saudi Arabia) Ghaday Al-Otaibi (NSR)

== See also ==
- Dawri Madaris
- Saudi Women's Cup
- Saudi Women's Super Cup
- Women's football in Saudi Arabia
- Saudi Women's Premier League
- Saudi Women's First Division League
- Saudi Women's Second Division League
