= Al Qadsiah FC (women) =

Saudi women's association football team

Al Qadsiah
- Full name: Al-Qadsiah Saudi Women's Football Club
- Nicknames: Faresat Al Sharqiya (Knight of the East); Fakhr Al Sharqiya (Pride of the Eastern Province)
- Founded: 2019; 7 years ago (As Al-Mutahed); 2023; 3 years ago (As Al-Qadsiah)
- Ground: Prince Saud bin Jalawi Stadium; Khobar
- Capacity: 11,000
- Owner: Saudi Aramco
- Head coach: Giles Barnes
- League: Saudi Women's Premier League
- 2024–25: SWPL, 3rd of 8
Home colours	Away colours	Third colours

Al-Qadsiah Saudi Women's Football Club, commonly known as Al Qadsiah Ladies (Arabic: سيدات القادسية), is a Saudi professional women's football team based in Khobar that plays in the Saudi Women's Premier League, the top-level women's football league in Saudi Arabia, following promotion in the 2022–23 season.

It is the women's team of football club Al Qadsiah. They have finished second in the inaugural Saudi Women's Division 1 which led to their promotion to the Premier League for the 2023–24 season.

== History ==
=== Al Mutahed era: (2019–2023) ===
Following the women's football rise in Saudi Arabia, the club was Founded in 2019 as Al Mutahed Women's Football Club, Compiling a squad replete with several Saudi players and a distinctly Bahraini flavor, they entered the first season of the Saudi Women's First Division League, drawn into the Eastern Province's group, Al Mutahed topped the group with 14 points and advanced to the knockout stage. The team progressed to the finals four after securing a 2–0 victory against Al Hmmah FC. In the subsequent semi-final, they triumphed over Jeddah Pride with a 1–0 win. Demonstrating a historic unbeaten run, the team advanced to the final of the first division without a single defeat. In the contested final against Al-Riyadh, the match concluded in a 1–1 draw after both full-time and extra time. However, they narrowly lost 2–1 in the penalty shootout, ultimately finishing in second place.

After Al-Shabab acquired Al-Yamamah, the latter spot in the premier league was given to Al Mutahed, First division runners-up to compete in the top-level women's football league in the country.

=== Al Qadsiah acquisition and its aftermath: (2023–present) ===
In August 2023, it was announced that Al Qadsiah FC has acquired the club to compete in the next season of the Saudi Premier League. A few days later, the former Greek player, Katerina Falida, took the role of the team's Technical Director. Eager to make a strong impression in their debut, Al Qadsiah appointed the former coach of Brazil's Flamengo and Portugal's Benfica, Luís Andrade, to oversee the senior team. As an experienced coach with numerous titles, his leadership resulted in significant signings shortly thereafter, including Rayanne Machado, Zaneta Wyne, Lindsey Harris, and Jessica Aby. Since their debut on October 13, 2023, Al Qadsiah has been unbeaten in all five first games of the season till they felt to one-nil loss to the champions Al-Nassr in matchday six.

Competing in the inaugural edition of the SAFF Women's Cup, Al Qadisah demonstrated their prowess. They began their journey with a dominant 7–0 victory in the round of 16. Advancing to the quarterfinals, they secured a 3–0 win against Eastern Flames. However, their quest for the title was halted in the semifinals, where they narrowly lost 2–3 to Al Ahli. Despite this setback, Al Qadisah bounced back in the bronze medal match, triumphing over Al-Ittihad with a 5–4 victory in the penalty shootout.

== Players ==
=== Current squad ===
As of 17 August 2025

No.	Pos.	Nation	Player
Goalkeepers
1	GK	(Saudi Arabia)	Salma Al-Dowsri
84	GK	(Saudi Arabia)	Randa Al-Abdulqader
72	GK	(Saudi Arabia)	Sara Khalid
Defenders
2	DF	(Saudi Arabia)	Dalal Abdullatif
12	DF	(Saudi Arabia)	Munirah Al-Ghanam
23	DF	(Saudi Arabia)	Raghad Mukhayzin
34	DF	(Saudi Arabia)	Mashael Al-Harbi
71	DF	(Saudi Arabia)	Bayan Mohammed
94	DF	(Brazil)	Rayanne Machado
99	DF	(Saudi Arabia)	Rana Hassan
Midfielders
7	MF	(Iceland)	Sara Björk Gunnarsdóttir
8	MF	(Saudi Arabia)	Rahaf Al-Mansouri

No.	Pos.	Nation	Player
Midfielders
10	MF	(France)	Léa Le Garrec
11	MF	(Saudi Arabia)	Yara Al-Faris
13	MF	(Saudi Arabia)	Soheir Batooq
14	MF	(Saudi Arabia)	Maram Al-Yahya
21	MF	(Saudi Arabia)	Saba Al-Yahya
Forwards
3	FW	(Cameroon)	Ajara Nchout Njoya
15	FW	(Saudi Arabia)	Sulaf Asseri
16	FW	(Brazil)	Adriana
17	FW	(Saudi Arabia)	Haya Al-Sunaidi
19	FW	(Saudi Arabia)	Joury Tarek
77	FW	(Saudi Arabia)	Noura Ibrahim

=== Current under-17 squad ===
As of 7 November 2025

No.	Pos.	Nation	Player
Goalkeepers
1	GK	(Saudi Arabia)	Jood Al-Saqer
12	GK	(Saudi Arabia)	Majd Al-Shareef
Midfielders
4	MF	(England)	Zainab Wish
6	MF	(Spain) (Germany)	Maria Heinold-Marchite
9	MF	(Egypt)	Rouqaia Abdelnabi
7	MF	(Saudi Arabia)	Zahra Al-Hawwaj
8	MF	(Saudi Arabia)	Rand Al-Zahrani
11	MF	(Saudi Arabia)	Malkut Al-Salem
17	MF	(Saudi Arabia)	Rimas Al-Aradi
23	MF	(Saudi Arabia)	Sara Al-Khamees

No.	Pos.	Nation	Player
Defenders
2	DF	(Saudi Arabia)	Maha Al-Badrani
3	DF	(Saudi Arabia)	Madhawi Al-Otaibi
5	DF	(Saudi Arabia)	Juwaan Al-Nassar
13	DF	(Saudi Arabia)	Retal Hakami
18	DF	(Saudi Arabia)	Fajer Al-Shiban
22	DF	(Saudi Arabia)	Walla Al-Hawwaj
Forwards
10	FW	(United States)	Shakari Owens
15	FW	(Saudi Arabia)	Hatun Al-Ghaeb
16	FW	(Saudi Arabia)	Norah Al-Dossari
19	FW	(Saudi Arabia)	Rana Rshdi
20	FW	(Saudi Arabia)	Zaenab Al-Sharaf

=== Former notable players ===
- (Bahrain) Hajar Al-Ansari
- (Colombia) Elizabeth Carabalí
- (Ivory Coast) Jessica Aby
- (Mexico) Verónica Pérez
- (United States) Zaneta Wyne
- (United States) Lindsey Harris

== Coaching and management staff ==
Position	Name
Chairman	(Saudi Arabia) Bader Al-Reziza
Chief executive officer	(England) James Bisgrove
Team manager	(Saudi Arabia) Ahmed Al-Khamas
Head coach	(Canada) Carmelina Moscato
Assistant coach	(Saudi Arabia) Jana Mohammed
Goalkeeping coach	(Greece) Georgios Fousekis
Video analyst	(Greece) Alexandros Rentzis
Technical director	(Greece) Katerina Falida

Last updated: 23 November 2023
Source: Al Qadsiah

== Records and statistics ==
=== Competition record ===
Al Qadsiah's performance over their completed seasons:

Season	Div.	pos.	Pld	W	D	L	GF	GA	Season Top Scorer	Cup pos.
2022–23	2D	2nd	8	6	3	0	16	3	Unknown	N/A
2023–24	1D	4th	14	6	5	3	13	9	(Mexico) Verónica Pérez (8 goals)	3rd
2024–25	1D	3rd	18	10	5	3	60	20	(Cameroon) Ajara Nchout (28 goals)	2nd
2025–26	1D	4th	14	7	2	5	55	25	(Brazil) Adriana (20 goals)	4th

=== Managerial statistics ===
As of match played 15 May 2026. Only competitive matches are included.

Name	Nat.	From	To	Pld	W	D	L	Win%	Honors
Luís Andrade	POR	8 September 2023	4 June 2025	40	20	12	8	50%	(bronze) 2023–24 SAFF Women's Cup; (silver) 2024–25 SAFF Women's Cup; (bronze) 2024–25 Saudi Women's Premier League
Carmelina Moscato	CAN	21 July 2025	12 July 2026	20	8	3	9	40%	
Giles Barnes	JAM	20 July 2026	Present	2	2	0	0	100%	

== Honours ==
- Saudi Women's First Division League:
  - Runners-up (1): 2022–23
- SAFF Women's Cup:
  - Runners-up (1): 2024–25
  - Third place (1): 2023–24
