= Al Hilal SFC (women) =

Al Hilal SFC Women
- Full name: Al Hilal Saudi Women Football Club
- Nicknames: Al-Za'eem (The Boss); The Blue Waves
- Founded: 2007; 19 years ago (as Challenge SC); 2022; 4 years ago (as Al Hilal)
- Ground: Inaya Medical Colleges Stadium, Riyadh
- Capacity: 2,000
- Owner(s): Public Investment Fund (75%); Al Hilal Non-Profit Foundation (25%)
- President: Fahad bin Nafel
- Head coach: Luís Andrade
- League: Saudi Women's Premier League
- 2024–25: SWPL, 6th of 8
- Website: alhilal.com
Home colours	Away colours	Third colours

Al Hilal Saudi Women Football Club, commonly known as Al Hilal Ladies (Arabic: سيدات الهلال), is a Saudi professional women's football club based in the capital Riyadh. The club is currently playing in the top division of Saudi Arabia, the Saudi Women's Premier League. The club won the first women's football competition, the Kingdom Women's Community Football League in 2020.

== History ==
Founded in 2007 as Challenge Women's Football Club. The team was the second-ever women's team in the country after Eastern Flames FC. In 2022 the team joined Al Hilal SFC.

The first season under the new name was in 2022–23 which ended with Al Hilal finishing second to Al Nassr, scoring 76 goals the most goals in the season, with Al Hilal's Iraqi Shokhan Salihi finishing as the top scores with 42 goals in total.

== Players ==
=== Current squad ===
As of 12 October 2024

Note: Flags indicate national team as defined under FIFA eligibility rules; some limited exceptions apply. Players may hold more than one non-FIFA nationality.

No.	Pos.	Nation	Player
1	GK	KSA	Nawal Al-Gelaish
2	DF	KSA	Mohrah Mutlaq
3	DF	KSA	Leen Mohammed
4	DF	KSA	Nouf Saud
6	MF	KSA	Lulu Al-Obaid
7	MF	MAR	Ghizlane Chebbak
8	FW	KSA	Al Bandari Al-Hwsawi
10	MF	FRA	Kheira Hamraoui
16	FW	KSA	Manar Al-Enezi
17	DF	CMR	Claudia Dabda (captain)
20	FW	POR	Jéssica Silva
21	FW	KSA	Joori Al-Johani
25	GK	KSA	Al Hanouf Al-Fulayj
29	FW	KSA	Danah Al-Dhuhiyan

No.	Pos.	Nation	Player
47	FW	KSA	Moudi Abdulmohsen
57	DF	KSA	Ghadeer Al-Balawi
66	FW	KSA	Al Bandari Mobarak
77	MF	KSA	Raghad Saleh
80	DF	NGR	Asisat Oshoala
88	GK	KSA	Laila Al-Qahtani
—	FW	KSA	Fatimah Mansour
—	DF	KSA	Maha Makbashi
—	MF	KSA	Noura Al-Hamli
—	GK	ESP	Noelia Gil
—	MF	KSA	Lulu Al-Jawini
—	FW	KSA	Abeer Nasser
—	FW	KSA	Al Adda Fahad
—	MF	KSA	Lamar Abousamra
—	MF	KSA	Joury Hashem

=== Notable Former players ===
- (Belarus) Anastasiya Linnik
- (Brazil) Mayara Gonçalves
- (Egypt) Eman Hassan
- (Ghana) Elizabeth Addo
- (Paraguay) Jessica Martínez
- (Panama) Aldrith Quintero
- (Ghana) Cynthia Konlan
- (Iraq) Direen Mulla Bakr
- (Lebanon) Dima Al Kasti
- (Panama) Lineth Cedeño
- (Ghana) Mavis Owusu
- (Iraq) Shokhan Salihi
- (Morocco) Maryam Benkirane

== Personnel ==
=== Current technical staff ===
Position	Name
Head coach	(Portugal) Luís Andrade
Assistant coach	Vacant
Fitness coach	Vacant
Technical coach	Vacant
Rehab coach	Vacant
Match analyst	Vacant
Interpreter	Vacant
B team coach	Vacant
Director of football	Vacant

== Honours ==
=== Official ===
- Women's Community Football League
  - Winners (1): 2020–21
- SAFF Women's National Football Championship:
  - Runners-up: 2021–22
- Saudi Women's Premier League:
  - Runners-up: 2022–23

=== Youth ===
- Saudi Women's U-17 Tournament:
  - Runners-up (1): 2023–24

== See also ==
- Al Hilal SFC
- Al Hilal (basketball)
