= List of Pakistan women's international footballers =

This is a list of Pakistan's women's international footballers – association football players who have played for the Pakistan women's national football team in officially recognised international matches. The women's national team is governed by the Pakistan Football Federation.

== Key ==
GK	GoalKeeper	DF	Defender	MF	Midfielder	FW	Forward	C	Captain	VC	Vice Captain

== International Footballers ==
=== Current Team ===
The following players are members of the national team (as at 14 November 2016).

No.	Pos.	Player	Date of birth (age)	Caps	Goals	Club
	GK	Syeda Mahpara Shahid	07 August 1993 (22)	-	-	(Pakistan Football Federation) Balochistan United WFC
	GK	Azra Farooq	18 November 1994 (21)	-	-	(Pakistan Football Federation) Model Town WFC
	GK	Nisha Ashraf	06 June 1998 (17)	-	-	Pakistan Army
	DF	Diana Baig	11 September 1995 (20)	-	-	Gilgit-Baltistan
	DF	Joyann Thomas	09 November 1998 (17)	-	-	(Pakistan Football Federation) Balochistan United WFC
	DF	Mehnaz Shah	02 November 1993 (22)	-	-	(Pakistan Football Federation) Balochistan United WFC
	DF	Mehwish Khan	13 August 1990 (25)	-	-	WAPDA
	DF	Rukshar Rashid		-	-	(Pakistan Football Federation) Diya W.F.C.
	DF	Rafia Parveen	13 November 1992 (23)	-	-	WAPDA
	DF	Sohaila Zarrain	13 July 1993 (22)	-	-	(Pakistan Football Federation) Balochistan United WFC
	DF	Warisha Khan	03 September 1998 (17)	-	-	(Pakistan Football Federation) Islamabad WFC
	MF	Malika-e-Noor (Vice captain)	07 November 1994 (21)	-	-	Pakistan Army
	MF	Sahar Zaman	13 June 1996 (19)	-	-	(Pakistan Football Federation) Young Rising Stars F.F.C.
	MF	Abiha Haider	23 February 1996 (20)	-	-	(Pakistan Football Federation) Balochistan United WFC
	MF	Zulfia Shah	30 May 1999 (16)	-	-	(Pakistan Football Federation) Balochistan United WFC
	MF	Roshnan Ali	16 November 1996 (19)	-	-	Pakistan Army
	MF	Fatima Ansari	12 June 1995 (20)	-	-	(Pakistan Football Federation) Young Rising Stars F.F.C.
	MF	Shayyan Nida Huqque	10 March 1998 (18)	-	-	(Pakistan Football Federation) Model Town WFC
	FW	Almira Rafeeque	27 January 1995 (21)	-	-	(Pakistan Football Federation) Balochistan United WFC
	FW	Hajra Khan (Captain)	29 December 1993 (22)	-	-	(Pakistan Football Federation) Balochistan United WFC
	FW	Warda Fatima		-	-	(Pakistan Football Federation) Islamabad United WFC

=== International players ===
No.	Pos.	Player	Date of birth (age)	Caps	Goals	Club
	GK	Syeda Mahpara Shahid		-	-	(Pakistan Football Federation) Balochistan United W.F.C.
	GK	Azra Farooq		-	-	(Pakistan Football Federation) Model Town W.F.C.
	GK	Nissha Ashraf		-	-	(Pakistan Football Federation) Pakistan Army F.C.
	GK	Shamaila Sattar		-	-	(Pakistan Football Federation) WAPDA F.C.
	DF	Malika-e-Noor (Vice captain)		-	-	(Pakistan Football Federation) Pakistan Army F.C.
	DF	Mehwish Khan		-	-	
	DF	Diana Baig		-	-	
	DF	Mehnaz Shah		-	-	
	DF	Rukshar Rashid		-	-	(Pakistan Football Federation) Diya W.F.C.
	DF	Joyyan Thomas		-	-	(Pakistan Football Federation) Balochistan United W.F.C.
	DF	Warisha Khan		-	-	(Pakistan Football Federation) Islamabad United W.F.C.
	DF	Sohaila Zarrain		-	-	(Pakistan Football Federation) Balochistan United W.F.C.
	DF	Rafia Parveen		-	-	(Pakistan Football Federation) WAPDA F.C.
	DF	Musarat Shaheen		-	-	
	DF	Bushra Jamil		-	-	(Pakistan Football Federation) Young Rising Stars F.F.C.
	DF	Asmaa Usman Butt		-	-	(Pakistan Football Federation) WAPDA F.C.
	MF	Sahar Zaman		-	-	(Pakistan Football Federation) Young Rising Stars F.F.C.
	MF	Shayyan Nida Huqque		-	-	(Pakistan Football Federation) Model Town W.F.C.
	MF	Sana Mahmud (Captain)		-	-	(Pakistan Football Federation) Young Rising Stars F.F.C.
	MF	Amber Nazir		-	-	(Pakistan Football Federation) Sports Science W.F.C.
	MF	Shaguffta Akhter		-	-	(Pakistan Football Federation) WAPDA F.C.
	MF	Abiha Haider		-	-	
	MF	Shahista Leghari (Vice captain)		-	-	(Pakistan Football Federation) Balochistan United W.F.C.
	MF	Swaiba Sarfaraz		-	-	
	MF	Nadia Bhatti		-	-	(Pakistan Football Federation) Young Rising Stars F.F.C.
	MF	Zulfia Shah		-	-	
	MF	Roshnan Ali		-	-	
	MF	Fatima Ansari		-	-	
	MF	Shayyan		-	-	
	MF	Ayeza Waheed		-	-	(Pakistan Football Federation) Young Rising Stars F.F.C.
	FW	Shahlyla Baloch		-	-	(Pakistan Football Federation) Balochistan United W.F.C.
	FW	Summaira Kausar		-	-	
	FW	Warda Fatima		-	-	(Pakistan Football Federation) Islamabad United W.F.C.
	FW	Mejzgaan Orkazai		-	-	(Pakistan Football Federation) Islamabad United W.F.C.
	FW	Riffat Mehdi (Vice captain)		-	-	(Pakistan Football Federation) Balochistan United W.F.C.
	FW	Shahida		-	-	(Pakistan Football Federation) Balochistan United W.F.C.
	FW	Almira Rafique		-	-	(Pakistan Football Federation) Balochistan United W.F.C.
	FW	Hajra Khan (Captain)		-	-	(Pakistan Football Federation) Balochistan United W.F.C.
	FW	Ishrat Fatima		-	-	(Pakistan Football Federation) Sports Science W.F.C.
	FW	Sophia		-	-	
	FW	Naila Rani		-	-	(Pakistan Football Federation) WAPDA F.C.
	FW	Humera Nazir		-	-	(Pakistan Football Federation) WAPDA F.C.
	FW	Mahina Ghalib		-	-	(Pakistan Football Federation) LSE W.F.C.

== See also ==
- List of Pakistan international footballers
