= Sohaila Zarrain =

Pakistani association football player

Personal information
- Full name: Sohaila Zarrain
- Date of birth: 13 July 1993 (age 33)
- Place of birth: Quetta, Pakistan
- Position: Defender

Senior career*
Years	Team	Apps	(Gls)
	Balochistan United	5	(1)

International career^{‡}
- Pakistan
- * Club domestic league appearances and goals as of 18:03, 27 October 2018 (UTC) ‡ National team caps and goals as of 18:03, 27 October 2018 (UTC)

Sohaila Zarrain (July 13, 1993) is a Pakistani footballer who plays as a defender for Balochistan United and the Pakistan national women's team.

Zarrain is the daughter of Pakistani women's football President and Senator Rubina Irfan and the sister of Balochistan United and National team manager Raheela Zarmeen. Another sister, Shahlyla Baloch, died in 2016.

== Honours ==
- National Women Football Championship: 2014
