= Tiberio Carafa =

Tiberio Carafa may refer to:

- Tiberio Carafa, Duke Nocera (died 1527)
- Tiberio Carafa (died 1588), bishop of Cassano all'Jonio and Potenza
- Tiberio Carafa (1580–1647), prince of Bisignano
- Tiberio Carafa (1669–1742), Italian soldier and man of letters
