= 2014 National Women's Football Championship (Pakistan) =

Tournament details
- Country: Pakistan
- Cities: Lahore; Karachi
- Venue(s): Punjab Stadium; MTFA Ground; Fame Football Ground; Punjab University Old Campus Ground; KPT Stadium; Dr. Muhammad Ali Shah Stadium
- Dates: 12–29 August 2014
- Teams: 16

Final positions
- Champions: Balochistan United (1st title)
- Runners-up: WAPDA
- Third place: Pakistan Army
- Fourth place: Diya W.F.C.

Tournament statistics
- Matches played: 32
- Goals scored: 226 (7.06 per match)
- Attendance: 4,121 (129 per match)
- Top goal scorer: Hajra Khan (31 goals)

Awards
- Misha Dawood Trophy: Malika-e-Noor
- Best goalkeeper: Syeda Mahpara
- All statistics correct as of August 29, 2014.

The 2014 National Women's Football Championship was the 10th season of the National Women's Football Championship, the top tier of women's football in Pakistan. The tournament was played from 12 to 29 August 2014, with three group stages played in Lahore and one in Karachi.

Young Rising Stars were the defending champions. They were knocked-out by 3–2 in the quarter-finals by Pakistan Army. Balochistan United won the championship after defeating WAPDA 7–0 in final. Balochistan United were the highest goal-scoring team in the tournament as well, scoring 64 goals in 6 matches, with top-scorer Hajra Khan scoring 31 goals.

== Teams ==
A total of 16 teams participated in the tournaments:

- Azad-Jammu Kashmir
- Balochistan
- Balochistan United
- Diya
- FATA
- Frontier College
- Gilgit-Baltistan FA
- Higher Education Commission
- Islamabad
- Khyber Pakhtunkhwa
- Model Town
- Pakistan Army
- Punjab
- Sindh
- WAPDA
- Young Rising Stars^{TH}

Notes
TH = Championship title holders

== Group stages ==
=== Group A ===
Pos	Team	Pld	W	D	L	GF	GA	GD	Pts	Qualification
1	WAPDA	3	3	0	0	16	0	+16	9	Advance to Knockout round
2	Young Rising Stars	3	2	0	1	12	1	+11	6	Advance to Knockout round
3	Model Town	3	1	0	2	9	5	+4	3	
4	Gilgit-Baltistan FA	3	0	0	3	0	31	−31	0	

Updated to match(es) played on 29 August 2014. Source: GSA
18 August 2014
15:15 (UTC+5)

Young Rising Stars	3–0	Model Town
Gul Zarmeen 38' (o.g.); Ayeza Waheed 85'; Amara Kiyani 87'	Report

Model Town Football Academy Ground, Lahore
Attendance: 50
18 August 2014
15:15 (UTC+5)

WAPDA	13–0	Gilgit-Baltistan FA
Nadia 18', 49', 67', 69', 71', 75'; Sumaira 29'; Samia 32' (pen.); Mehwish Khan 41', 55'; Rafia Parveen 53', 61'; Shagufta 59'	Report

Fame Club Football Ground, Lahore
Attendance: 35

20 August 2014
16:00 (UTC+5)

Young Rising Stars	9–0	Gilgit-Baltistan FA
Ayeza Waheed 2'; Nadia Bhatti 5', 44', 75'; Sahar Zamab 10'; Zara Iqbal 16'; Fatima Abbasi 29'; Amara Kiyani 36', 80'	Report	Misbah 90+3'

Fame Club Football Ground, Lahore
Attendance: 50
20 August 2014
16:00 (UTC+5)

WAPDA	2–0	Model Town
Azra 17'; Nadia 41'	Report

Model Town Football Academy Ground, Lahore
Attendance: 80

22 August 2014
16:00 (UTC+5)

Model Town	9–0	Gilgit-Baltistan FA
Gul Haider 4'; Javeria Chaudhary 12' (pen.), 53', 58'; Shayan Nida 41'; Sophiya Nayab 43', 61', 69'; Yamna Anwer 63'	Report

Model Town Football Academy Ground, Lahore
Attendance: 55
22 August 2014
16:00 (UTC+5)

Young Rising Stars	0–1	WAPDA
	Report	Mehwish Khan 83'

Fame Club Football Ground, Lahore
Attendance: 50

=== Group B ===
Pos	Team	Pld	W	D	L	GF	GA	GD	Pts	Qualification
1	Balochistan United	3	3	0	0	33	0	+33	9	Advance to Knockout round
2	Diya W.F.C.	3	2	0	1	10	2	+8	6	Advance to Knockout round
3	Sindh	3	0	1	2	0	19	−19	1	
4	Balochistan	3	0	1	2	0	22	−22	1	

Updated to match(es) played on 29 August 2014. Source: GSA
12 August 2014
15:30 (UTC+5)

Balochistan United	17–0	Sindh
Hajra Khan 7', 19', 47', 54', 83', 85', 88'; Shahlyla Ahmadzai 16', 43', 50', 60', 75', 77'; Abiha Haider 58', 66'; Areesha 81', 89'	Report

KPT Stadium, Karachi
Attendance: 500
12 August 2014
15:30 (UTC+5)

Diya W.F.C.	8–0	Balochistan
Ayesha Khan 4'; Rukhsar Rashid 19' (pen.), 82'; Karishma Inayat 24', 86'; Ayesha Mehfooz 39'; Kiran Yousuf 55', 60'	Report

Dr. Mohammad Ali Shah Stadium, Karachi
Attendance: 35

14 August 2014
15:30 (UTC+5)

Balochistan United	14–0	Balochistan
Shahlyla Ahmadzai 2', 15', 43', 44'; Hajra Khan 10', 17', 27', 39', 65'; Areesha 30'; Abiha Haider 53'; Shante Marium 63'; Sohaila Zarrain 75'; Almeera Rafique 78'	Report

KPT Stadium, Karachi
Attendance: 600
14 August 2014
15:30 (UTC+5)

Diya W.F.C.	2–0	Sindh
Rukhsar 12'; Qurrat-ul-Ain 90+1'	Report

Dr. Muhammad Ali Shah Stadium, Karachi
Attendance: 1,200

16 August 2014
15:30 (UTC+5)

Sindh	0–0	Balochistan
	Report

Dr. Muhammad Ali Shah Stadium, Karachi
Attendance: 30
16 August 2014
15:30 (UTC+5)

Balochistan United	2–0	Diya W.F.C.
Shahlyla Ahmadzai 13'; Hajra Khan 66'	Report

KPT Stadium, Karachi

=== Group C ===
Pos	Team	Pld	W	D	L	GF	GA	GD	Pts	Qualification
1	Pakistan Army	3	3	0	0	32	0	+32	9	Advance to Knockout round
2	Higher Education Commission	3	2	0	1	17	3	+14	6	Advance to Knockout round
3	Frontier College	3	1	0	2	2	16	−14	3	
4	Azad-Jammu Kashmir	3	0	0	3	0	32	−32	0	

Updated to match(es) played on 29 August 2014. Source: GSA
16 August 2014
15:15 (UTC+5)

Higher Education Commission	5–0	Frontier College
Rooma Abbas 26'; Farzana Batool 28', 63'; Muqaddas Parveen 55'; Farhat Batool 61'	Report

WAPDA Sports Complex, Lahore
Attendance: 60
18 August 2014
15:15 (UTC+5)

Frontier College	2–0	Azad-Jammu Kashmir
Naila 39'; Fozia Wali 74'	Report

WAPDA Sports Complex, Lahore
Attendance: 50

21 August 2014
15:15 (UTC+5)

Pakistan Army	18–0	Azad-Jammu Kashmir
Swaiba 4', 21', 36'; Fatima 10', 44'; Malika-e-Noor 13', 19', 28', 32', 61', 67', 72', 76'; Roshnan Ali 15', 38', 65'; Umama 55'; Filza Waheed 74' (o.g.)	Report

WAPDA Sports Complex, Lahore
Attendance: 90
22 August 2014
15:30 (UTC+5)

Pakistan Army	11–0	Frontier College
Roshnan Ali 4', 49', 69'; Fatima 13', 26', 67', 73'; Malika-e-Noor 24', 30', 57', 82'	Report

WAPDA Sports Complex, Lahore
Attendance: 30

22 August 2014
15:15 (UTC+5)

Higher Education Commission	12–0	Azad-Jammu Kashmir
Muqqadas Parveen 17', 61', 63'; Memoona Gul 22'; Rooma Abbas 24'; Farzana Batool 31', 34', 38', 48'; Farhat Batool 36'; Hina Noreen 56'; Uzma Nawaz 76'	Report

WAPDA Sports Complex, Lahore
Attendance: 20
23 August 2014
21:00 (UTC+5)

Pakistan Army	3–0	Higher Education Commission
Roobina 41'; Malika-e-Noor 49'; Roshnan Ali 74'	Report

WAPDA Sports Complex, Lahore
Attendance: 55

=== Group D ===
Pos	Team	Pld	W	D	L	GF	GA	GD	Pts	Qualification
1	Islamabad	3	3	0	0	29	0	+29	9	Advance to Knockout round
2	Punjab	3	2	0	1	15	5	+10	6	Advance to Knockout round
3	FATA	3	0	1	2	1	19	−18	1	
4	Khyber Pakhtunkhwa	3	0	1	2	1	22	−21	1	

Updated to match(es) played on 29 August 2014. Source: GSA
17 August 2014
15:15 (UTC+5)

Punjab	8–0	Khyber Pakhtunkhwa
Humaiza Riaz 2', 54'; Syeda Huda 10', 24', 42'; Bisma Afzal 12'; Mehwish Arooj 13'; Iram Shehzadi 27'	Report

Punjab University Old Campus Ground, Lahore
Attendance: 80
18 August 2014
15:15 (UTC+5)

Punjab	7–0	FATA
Humaiza Riaz 24', 65', 67'; Sanderal Salamat 33', 75'; Syeda Huda 35', 45+2'	Report

Punjab University Old Campus Ground, Lahore
Attendance: 10

20 August 2014
15:15 (UTC+5)

Islamabad	11–0	FATA
Eman Ansari 2', 5', 9', 10', 67', 70', 73'; Eman Ejaz 25'; Zuha Ansari 28'; Memoona Shah 53'; Warisha Khan 80'	Report

Punjab University Old Campus Ground, Lahore
Attendance: 50
21 August 2014
15:15 (UTC+5)

Islamabad	5–0	Punjab
Eman Ejaz 31', 44', 69'; Aysha Jamal 38'; Eman Ansari 39'	Report

Punjab University Old Campus Ground, Lahore
Attendance: 0

22 August 2014
15:15 (UTC+5)

Islamabad	13–0	Khyber Pakhtunkhwa
Eman Ansari 7', 25', 50', 56', 83'; Zuha Ansari 11', 17'; Eman Ejaz 13', 14'; Shah Bano 47', 54'; Memoona Shah 47', 64'	Report

Punjab University Old Campus Ground, Lahore
Attendance: 20
23 August 2014
21:00 (UTC+5)

Khyber Pakhtunkhwa	1–1	FATA
Seema Khan 18'	Report	Kumal 71'

Punjab University Old Campus Ground, Lahore
Attendance: 40

== Knockout round ==
=== Quarter-finals ===
25 August 2014
19:00 (UTC+5)

Balochistan United	19–1	Punjab
Shahlyla 3', 11', 27'; Hajra 6', 20', 22', 31', 43', 57', 63', 65', 66', 68', 81', 88'; Sanderal Salamat 34' (o.g.); Almeera Raqfique 31', 44', 69'; Shahida 74'	Report	Iram Shehzadi 90+1'

Punjab University Old Campus Ground, Lahore
Attendance: 30
25 August 2014
19:00 (UTC+5)

Pakistan Army	3–2	Young Rising Stars
Malika 38'; Roshnan Ali 53', 75'	Report	Amara Kiyani 34'; Sahar Zaman 67'

Model Town Football Academy Ground, Lahore
Attendance: 45

25 August 2014
19:00 (UTC+5)

WAPDA	3–0	Higher Education Commission
Nadia 18', 53'; Mehwish 80'	Report

Fame Club Football Ground, Lahore
Attendance: 75
25 August 2014
15:15 (UTC+5)

Islamabad	0–0 (a.e.t.)	Diya W.F.C.
Eman Ejaz 31', 44', 69'; Aysha Jamal 38'; Eman Ansari 39'	Report
Penalties
Eman Ansari (penalty scored); Eman Ejaz (penalty scored); Zuha Ansari (penalty missed); Warisha Khan (penalty missed); Memoona Shah (penalty missed)	2–3	(penalty scored) Ayesha Khan; (penalty missed) Karishma Inayat; (penalty scored) Ayesha Mahfooz; (penalty missed) Rukhsar; (penalty scored) Kiran Yousuf

Punjab Stadium, Lahore
Attendance: 104

=== Semi-finals ===
27 August 2014
19:00 (UTC+5)

Pakistan Army	3–5	Balochistan United
Malika 28', 64'; Roshnan Ali 75'	Report	Hajra 2', 72'; Shahlyla 10', 26'; Shante Marium 81'

Punjab Stadium, Lahore
Attendance: 50

27 August 2014
19:00 (UTC+5)

WAPDA	4–0	Diya W.F.C.
Asma Usman 13' (pen.); Nadia 55'; Shagufta 72'; Mehwish 87'	Report

Punjab University Old Campus Ground, Lahore
Attendance: 20

=== Third place ===
28 August 2014
19:00 (UTC+5)

Pakistan Army	2–0	Diya W.F.C.
Fatima 1'; Roshnan Ali 68'	Report

Fame Club Football Ground, Lahore
Attendance: 187

=== Finals ===
29 August 2014
19:00 (UTC+5)

Balochistan United	7–0	WAPDA
Hajra 4', 24', 39', 60'; Shahida 54'; Joyann 58', 90+2'	Report

Punjab Stadium, Lahore
Attendance: 450

=== Top scorer ===
As of 29 August 2014

Rank	Scorer	Club	Goals
1	Hajra Khan	Balochistan United	31
2	Malika-e-Noor	Pakistan Army	16
2	Shahlyla Ahmadzai	Balochistan United	16
4	Eman Ansari	Islamabad	13
5	Roshnan Ali	Pakistan Army	11
6	Nadia	WAPDA	10
