= Giovanni Battista Ansaldo =

Italian Roman Catholic prelate

Most Reverend Giovanni Battista Ansaldo
- Bishop of Cariati e Cerenzia
- Church: Catholic Church
- Diocese: Diocese of Cariati e Cerenzia
- In office: 1576–1578
- Predecessor: Sebastiano Maffo
- Successor: Tarquinio Prisco

Orders
- Consecration: by Giulio Antonio Santorio

Personal details
- Died: 1578 Cariati, Italy

Giovanni Battista Ansaldo (died 1578) was a Roman Catholic prelate who served as Bishop of Cariati e Cerenzia (1576–1578).

== Biography ==
On 24 October 1576, Giovanni Battista Ansaldo was appointed during the papacy of Pope Gregory XIII as Bishop of Cariati e Cerenzia. On 4 November 1576, he was consecrated bishop by Giulio Antonio Santorio, Cardinal-Priest of San Bartolomeo all'Isola, with Cesare de' Giacomelli, Bishop of Belcastro, and Gaspare Viviani, Bishop of Hierapetra et Sitia, serving as co-consecrators. He served as Bishop of Cariati e Cerenzia until his death in 1578.

== See also ==
- Catholic Church in Italy

== External links and additional sources ==
- Cheney, David M. "Diocese of Cariati". Catholic-Hierarchy.org. (for Chronology of Bishops) ^{[self-published]}
- Chow, Gabriel. "Diocese of Cariati (Italy)". GCatholic.org. (for Chronology of Bishops) ^{[self-published]}

Catholic Church titles
| Preceded by Sebastiano Maffo | Bishop of Cariati e Cerenzia; 1576–1578 | Succeeded by Tarquinio Prisco |
