= Owen Lewis (bishop) =

Welsh Roman Catholic bishop

Most Reverend Owen Lewis
- Bishop of Cassano all'Ionio
- Church: Catholic Church
- In office: 1588-1595
- Predecessor: Tiberio Carafa
- Successor: Giulio Caracciolo

Orders
- Consecration: 14 February 1588 by Nicolás de Pellevé

Personal details
- Born: 28 December 1532 Llangadwaladr, Anglesey, Wales
- Died: October 14, 1594 (aged 61) Rome

Owen Lewis, also known as Lewis Owen (Italian: Ludovico Audoeno, Latin: Audoenus Ludovicus; 28 December 1532 – 14 October 1594) was a Welsh Roman Catholic priest, jurist, administrator and diplomat, who became Bishop of Cassano all'Jonio.

== Early life ==
Born on 28 December 1532 in Wales in the hamlet of Bodeon, Llangadwaladr, Anglesey, he was the son of a freeholder. He became a scholar of Winchester College in 1547, and a perpetual fellow of New College, Oxford, in 1554; and was admitted to the degree of B.C.L. 21 February 1558–59. His tombstone indicates that he also held the degree of Doctor in utroque iure, Civil and Canon Law.

Opposed to Protestantism, he left the university in about 1561 and went to the University of Douai, where he completed degrees in law and divinity and was appointed regius professor of law. He was also made a canon of Cambrai Cathedral, chapter official, and archdeacon of Hainaut.

== Curialist ==
A lawsuit of the chapter of Cambrai occasioned Lewis's going to Rome. Popes Sixtus V and Gregory XIII each made him Referendary of signatures and secretary to the several congregations and consultations concerning the clergy and regulars.

Lewis helped set up the English Colleges of Douai and Rome with William Allen. In 1578, he had Morys Clynnog brought in as warden to that in Rome. Nationalist feelings, however, came to the fore, and the English students agitated for a Jesuit to be put in charge. This incident has been identified as the beginning of the 'Jesuit and secular' divide in the English mission.

== In Milan ==
Lewis was an administrator in Milan from 1580 to 1584. Charles Borromeo, as archbishop of Milan, brought in outsiders; he appointed Lewis one of the vicars-general of his diocese and took him into his family. Borromeo died in Lewis's arms. Gruffydd Robert assisted Lewis in his work.

== Later life ==
In Rome, Lewis took on the Papal Curia policy concerning the English College, Reims and Mary Queen of Scots.

By the joint consent of Sixtus V and Philip II of Spain, Lewis was promoted to the bishopric of Cassano in the Kingdom of Naples on 3 February 1588; and was consecrated at Rome 14 February (N.S.) 1588 by Nicolás de Pellevé, Archbishop of Sens, with Giovanni Battista Albani, Titular Patriarch of Alexandria, and Fabio Biondi, Titular Patriarch of Jerusalem, serving as co-consecrators. At the time of the Spanish Armada, he was supported to be made archbishop of York in the event of the enterprise succeeding. However, Allen disapproved of the idea, so the proposal became available to other bishoprics. Lewis continued to reside in Rome, and the pope appointed him one of the apostolic visitors of that city and sent him to Switzerland as nuncio.

He was the co-consecrator of Bishop Filippo Archinto of Como on 27 August 1595.

He died in Rome on 14 October (N.S.) 1595, and was buried in the chapel of the English College. A a monument with a Latin epitaph was erected to his memory, giving the year of death as 1595.

Lewis's old schoolfellow Thomas Stapleton dedicated to him his Promptuarium Catholicum, Paris, 1595.

== Episcopal consecrations ==
Episcopal succession of Owen Lewis

While bishop, he was the principal co-consecrator of:

- Giovanni Leonardo Bottiglieri, Bishop of Lettere-Gragnano (1591);
- Pompeo de Nobili, Bishop of Ripatransone (1591);
- Carlo Bescapè, Bishop of Novara (1593);
- Tommaso Calvi, Bishop of Tropea (1593);
- Guglielmo Bastoni, Bishop of Pavia (1593);
- Basile Pignatelli, Bishop of L'Aquila (1593);
- Marsilio Landriani, Bishop of Vigevano (1593);
- Alexander de Turre, Bishop of Hierapetra et Sitia (1594); and
- Alessandro de Franceschi, Bishop of Forlì (1594).

== Sources ==
- Mr Ludovico Audoeno, Britanno, Vescovo di Cassano e la prime costituzioni del seminario diocesano. Cosenza 1909.
- Apollaro, E. (1970). "Spiritualità e riforma cattolica nella diocesi di Cassano allo Jonio durante l'episcopato di Mons. Ludovico Audoeno (1588–1595," (in Italian), in: Archivio storico per la Calabria e la Lucania vol. 37-38 (1969–1970), pp. 351 ff.
- Anstruther, Godfrey (1962). "Owen Lewis," in: John F. Allen, The English Hospice at Rome (1962; Leominster: Gracewing 2005), pp. 274-294.
- Jones, Emyr Gwynne (1959). "LEWIS, OWEN, or OWEN, LEWIS (1533-1595)". Welsh Biography Online. Honourable Society of Cymmrodorion.
- Williams, Robert (1852). A biographical dictionary of eminent Welshmen. Llandovery-London: William Rees 1852). pp. 384-385.

This article incorporates text from a publication now in the public domain: Cooper, Thompson (1893). "Lewis, Owen". In Lee, Sidney (ed.). Dictionary of National Biography. Vol. 33. London: Smith, Elder & Co.

Catholic Church titles
Preceded by Tiberio Carafa	Bishop of Cassano all'Jonio; 1588–1595	Succeeded by Giulio Caracciolo
Preceded by Ottavio Paravicini	Apostolic Nuncio to Switzerland; 1591–1595	Succeeded by Giovanni della Torre
