= Alexander de Turre =

Most Reverend Alexander de Turre
- Church: Catholic Church
- Diocese: Diocese of Hierapetra et Sitia
- In office: 1594–1624
- Predecessor: Gaspare Viviani
- Successor: Pierre Pisani

Orders
- Consecration: 13 February 1594 by Ludovico de Torres

Personal details
- Born: 1555
- Died: 1624 (age 39)

Alexander de Turre, C.R.L. (died 1624) was a Roman Catholic prelate who served as Bishop of Hierapetra et Sitia (1594–1624).

== Biography ==
Alexander de Turre was born in 1555 and ordained a priest in the Canons Regular of the Lateran. On 31 January 1594, he was appointed during the papacy of Pope Clement VIII as Bishop of Hierapetra et Sitia. On 13 February 1594, he was consecrated bishop by Ludovico de Torres, Archbishop of Monreale, with Melchiorre Pelletta, Titular Bishop of Chrysopolis in Arabia, and Owen Lewis (bishop), Bishop of Cassano all'Jonio, serving as co-consecrators. He served as Bishop of Hierapetra et Sitia until his death in 1624.

While bishop, he was the principal consecrator of Bartol Kačić, Bishop of Makarska, and the principal co-consecrator of Leonardo Tritonio, Bishop of Poreč (1609).

Catholic Church titles
Preceded by Gaspare Viviani	Bishop of Hierapetra et Sitia; 1594–1624	Succeeded by Pierre Pisani
