= Andrea de Franchis =

17th-century Roman Catholic bishop

Most Reverend Andrea de Franchis
- Archbishop of Trani
- Church: Catholic Church
- Archdiocese: Archdiocese of Cassano all'Jonio
- In office: 1598–1603
- Predecessor: Giulio Caracciolo
- Successor: Juan de Rada

Personal details
- Died: 1603

Andrea de Franchis (died 1603) was a Roman Catholic prelate who served as Archbishop of Trani (1598–1603).

== Biography ==
On 4 Aug 1598, he was appointed during the papacy of Pope Clement VIII as Archbishop of Trani. He served as Archbishop of Trani until his death in 1603.

== External links and additional sources ==
- Cheney, David M. "Archdiocese of Trani-Barletta-Bisceglie (-Nazareth)". Catholic-Hierarchy.org. (for Chronology of Bishops) ^{[self-published]}
- Chow, Gabriel. "Archdiocese of Trani-Barletta-Bisceglie (Italy)". GCatholic.org. (for Chronology of Bishops) ^{[self-published]}

Catholic Church titles
Preceded by Giulio Caracciolo	Archbishop of Trani; 1598–1603	Succeeded by Juan de Rada
