= Zulfia Shah =

Pakistani footballer (born 1999)

Zulfia Nazir
Personal information
- Full name: Zulfia Nazir Ahmed Shah
- Date of birth: 30 May 1999 (age 27)
- Place of birth: Pakistan
- Position: Midfielder

Team information
- Current team: Karachi United

Senior career*
Years	Team	Apps	(Gls)
	Balochistan United	7	(0)
2017–2021	Royal Eagles Women’s FC	12	(9)
2021	Karachi United		

International career^{‡}
2014–	Pakistan	8	(1)
- * Club domestic league appearances and goals ‡ National team caps and goals as of 19:18, 25 October 2023 (UTC)

Zulfia Nazir Ahmed Shah (Urdu: زلفیہ نذیر احمد شاہ; born 30 May 1999) is a Pakistani football player. She is a member of the Pakistan national team and plays as a midfielder.

== Background ==
Shah belongs to the Gilgit-Baltistan region of the country.

== Career ==
=== National ===
She plays as a midfielder at the domestic level. Since 2021, she has been playing for Karachi United. Earlier, she played for Balochistan United and Punjab.

==== Karachi United ====
She debuted for Karachi United in their first match of the 2021 National Women Football Championship in Karachi against Karachi W.F.C.. She scored 10 goals in that match.

=== International ===
In October 2014, as preparation for the SAFF Championship, she participated in a three-match friendly series against hosts, Bahrain. In November, she participated in the 3rd SAFF Women's Championship held in Islamabad, where she played in all three of Pakistan's games.

When the national team returned to action after an eight-year hiatus at the 2022 SAFF Women's Championship, she was among the seven previous players to be called for the 23-member squad. She started all three of Pakistan's matches at the event. In the third match, against Maldives, she suffered a knee injury which kept her out of action for around ten months. She was named in the squad for Pakistan's friendly against Singapore in July 2023.

She featured in all three of Pakistan's matches at the 2023 SAFF Women's International Friendly Tournament in Taif, Saudi Arabia, starting the last two. She scored her first national team goal against Laos.

As of match played 28 September 2023
Scores and results list Pakistan's goal tally first, score column indicates score after each Shah's goal

List of international goals scored by Shah
No.	Date	Venue	Cap	Opponent	Score	Result	Competition	Ref.
1	28 September 2023	King Fahd Sports City, Taif, Saudi Arabia	8	Laos	1–0	1–1 (4–2 p)	2023 SAFF Women's International Friendly Tournament (Taif)	

== Honors ==
- National Women Football Championship: 2014
