= Laurentius Bernardini =

Roman Catholic prelate

Most Reverend Laurentius Bernardini
- Titular Bishop of Coronea
- Church: Catholic Church

Orders
- Consecration: 28 Sep 1572 by Thomas Goldwell

Laurentius Bernardini was a Roman Catholic prelate who served as Titular Bishop of Coronea.

== Biography ==
Laurentius Bernardini was ordained a priest in the Order of Preachers. On 27 Aug 1572, he was appointed during the papacy of Pope Gregory XIII as Titular Bishop of Coronea. On 28 Sep 1572, he was consecrated bishop by Thomas Goldwell, Bishop of Saint Asaph, with Ippolito Arrivabene, Bishop Emeritus of Hierapetra, and Giambattista de Benedictis, Bishop of Penne e Atri, serving as co-consecrators. It is uncertain how long he served as bishop of Coronea; the next bishop of record was Alonso D'Avalos who was appointed in 1598.

== See also ==
- Catholic Church in Greece
