= Miguel Thomàs de Taxaquet =

Spanish Roman Catholic prelate

Most Reverend Miguel Thomàs de Taxaquet
- Bishop of Lérida
- Church: Catholic Church
- Diocese: Diocese of Lérida
- In office: 1577–1578
- Predecessor: Antonio Agustín
- Successor: Carlos Domenech

Orders
- Consecration: 24 Nov 1577 by Giulio Antonio Santorio

Personal details
- Born: 1529 Lluchmayor, Spain
- Died: 9 Jul 1578 (age 49) Lérida, Spain

Miguel Thomàs de Taxaquet (also Miguel Tomás de Taxaquet) (1529 – 9 July 1578) was a Roman Catholic prelate who served as Bishop of Lérida (1577–1578).

== Biography ==
Miguel Thomàs de Taxaquet was born in Lluchmayor, Spain in 1529. On 8 Nov 1577, he was appointed during the papacy of Pope Gregory XIII as Bishop of Lérida. On 24 Nov 1577, he was consecrated bishop by Giulio Antonio Santorio, Cardinal-Priest of San Bartolomeo all'Isola, with Thomas Goldwell, Bishop of Saint Asaph, and Gaspare Viviani, Bishop of Hierapetra et Sitia, serving as co-consecrators. He served as Bishop of Lérida until his death on 9 Jul 1578.

== External links and additional sources ==
- Cheney, David M. "Diocese of Lleida". Catholic-Hierarchy.org. (for Chronology of Bishops) ^{[self-published]}
- Chow, Gabriel. "Diocese of Lleida (Spain)". GCatholic.org. (for Chronology of Bishops) ^{[self-published]}

Catholic Church titles
Preceded by Antonio Agustín	Bishop of Lérida; 1577–1578	Succeeded by Carlos Domenech
