= Ludovico de Torres (cardinal) =

Roman Catholic prelate

His Eminence Ludovico de Torres
- Cardinal-Priest of San Pancrazio
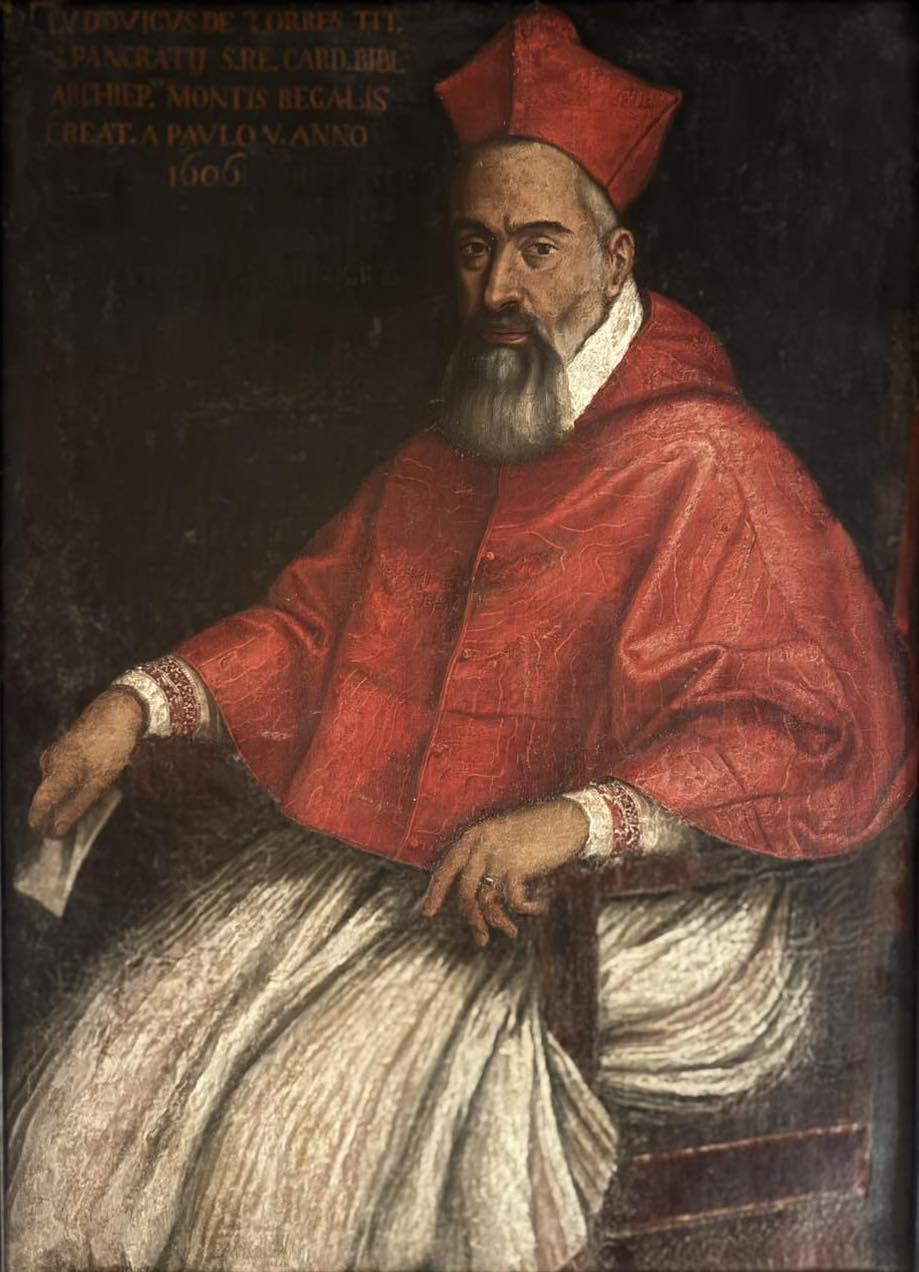
- Church: Catholic Church
- Archdiocese: Archdiocese of Monreale
- In office: 1606–1609
- Predecessor: Domenico Ginnasi
- Successor: Gabriel Trejo y Paniagua

Orders
- Consecration: 31 January 1588 by Gabriele Paleotti
- Created cardinal: 11 September 1606
- Rank: Cardinal-Priest

Personal details
- Born: 1552 Rome, Italy
- Died: 8 July 1609 (age 57) Monreale, Italy

Ludovico de Torres (1552 – 8 July 1609) was a Roman Catholic prelate who served as Cardinal-Priest of San Pancrazio (1606–1609) and Archbishop of Monreale (1588–1609).

== Biography ==
Ludovico de Torres was born in Rome in 1552. His family was originally from Málaga, Spain. He studied law at the University of Perugia and then earned a doctorate from the University of Bologna in both canon and civil law. In 1572, he served as vicar general of the diocese of Monreale where his uncle was bishop; and then returned to Rome where he served as vicar of S. Lorenzo in Damaso, Canon of the patriarchal Liberian basilica, and Scrittore apostolico to the Curia. On 22 January 1588, he was appointed during the papacy of Pope Sixtus V as Archbishop of Monreale succeeding his uncle of the same name. On 31 January 1588, he was consecrated bishop at the church of S. Lorenzo in Damaso by Gabriele Paleotti, Archbishop of Bologna, with Silvio Savelli, Archbishop of Rossano, and José Esteve Juan, Bishop of Vieste, serving as co-consecrators. In the consistory of 11 September 1606, he was elevated by Pope Paul V to Cardinal-Priest and on 19 December 1606, received the title of San Pancrazio. On 4 July 1607 he was named librarian of the Holy Roman Church. He served as Archbishop of Monreale until his death on 8 July 1609. He is buried in the metropolitan cathedral of Monreale. He was the uncle of Cardinal Cosimo de Torres, who later served as Archbishop of Monreale (1634-1642); and was a close friend of poet Torquato Tasso.

== Episcopal succession ==
While bishop, he was the principal consecrator of:

- Juan Corrionero, Bishop of Catania (1589);
- Lorenzo Celsi (bishop), Bishop of Castro del Lazio (1591);
- Carlo Bescapè, Bishop of Novara (1593);
- Alexander de Turre, Bishop of Hierapetra et Sitia (1594);
- Giovanni Garzia Mellini, Titular Archbishop of Rhodes (1605);
- Guido Bentivoglio d'Aragona, Titular Archbishop of Rhodes (1607);
- Vincenzo Bonincontro, Bishop of Agrigento (1607);
- Franciscus Manini, Bishop of Novigrad (1607);

and the principal co-consecrator of:

- Alessandro Riccardi, Bishop of Sessa Aurunca (1591);
- Napoleone Comitoli, Bishop of Perugia (1591);
- Tommaso Calvi, Bishop of Tropea (1593);
- Guglielmo Bastoni, Bishop of Pavia (1593);
- Basile Pignatelli, Bishop of L'Aquila (1593);
- Marsilio Landriani (bishop), Bishop of Vigevano (1593);
- Alessandro de Franceschi, Bishop of Forlì (1594);
- Ascanio Giacobazio, Bishop of Anglona-Tursi (1595);
- Antonio d'Aquino, Bishop of Sarno (1595);
- Ottavio Bandini, Archbishop of Fermo (1596);
- Erminio Valenti, Bishop of Faenza (1605);
- Pompeio Arrigoni, Archbishop of Benevento (1607); and
- Anselmo Marzato, Archbishop of Chieti (1607).

Catholic Church titles
| Preceded by Ludovico de Torres (bishop, born 1533) | Archbishop of Monreale; 1588–1609 | Succeeded by Arcangelo Gualtieri |
| Preceded by Domenico Ginnasi | Cardinal-Priest of San Pancrazio; 1606–1609 | Succeeded by Gabriel Trejo y Paniagua |
