= Marsilio Landriani (bishop) =

Roman Catholic prelate

Most Reverend Marsilio Landriani
- Bishop of Vigevano
- Church: Catholic Church
- Diocese: Diocese of Vigevano
- In office: 1593–1609
- Predecessor: Pietro Fauno Costacciaro
- Successor: Pietro Giorgio Odescalchi

Orders
- Consecration: 14 November 1593 by Tolomeo Gallio

Personal details
- Born: 1528
- Died: 27 August 1609 (age 81) Vigevano, Italy

Marsilio Landriani (1528–1609) was a Roman Catholic prelate who served as Bishop of Vigevano (1593–1609).

He was born in 1528. On 10 November 1593, he was appointed by Pope Clement VIII as Bishop of Vigevano. On 14 November 1593, he was consecrated bishop by Tolomeo Gallio, Cardinal-Bishop of Frascati, with Ludovico de Torres, Archbishop of Monreale, and Owen Lewis, Bishop of Cassano all'Jonio, serving as co-consecrators.

He served as Bishop of Vigevano until his death on 27 August 1609.

While bishop, he was the principal co-consecrator of Giovanni Battista Guanzato, Bishop of Polignano (1598).

== External links and additional sources ==
- Cheney, David M. "Diocese of Vigevano". Catholic-Hierarchy.org. (for Chronology of Bishops) ^{[self-published]}
- Chow, Gabriel. "Diocese of Vigevano". GCatholic.org. (for Chronology of Bishops) ^{[self-published]}
- Cappellitti, Giuseppe (1838). "Le chiese d'Italia della loro origine sino ai nostri giorni". p. 619.

Catholic Church titles
Preceded by Pietro Fauno Costacciaro	Bishop of Vigevano; 1593–1609	Succeeded by Pietro Giorgio Odescalchi
