= Shahida Raza =

Pakistani field hockey player (died 2023)

Shahida Raza (Urdu: شاہدہ رضا; 1990s – 26 February 2023) was a Pakistani field hockey and football player known as "Chintu" by her teammates. She captained the national team in hockey, and had also represented Pakistan in football and martial arts. She died when a migrant boat sank off the coast of Italy on 26 February 2023.

== Early life and career ==
Raza, known by the nickname Chintu, was from the mountainous region of Quetta. She began her career in field hockey in 2007, and played on teams sponsored by the Army, the Water & Power Development Authority (WAPDA), and Pakistan Railways. She played for Pakistan in the 2009 Asian Hockey Federation U-18 Girls' Cup, and at senior level in the 2012 Asian Hockey Federation Cup. A half-back, she also captained of the national team. Domestically, she was on the WAPDA team that reached the finals of the 2012 Pakistan Hockey Federation U-21 Girls Cup.

Raza also played for Pakistan in football; domestically, she played for Balochistan United W.F.C., with whom as of November 2013 she had reached eight national championship finals.

She also competed nationally and internationally as a professional kickboxer and in wushu. In wushu she represented Pakistan at the 2016 3-Nations International Wushu Championship in Lahore, where she won gold, the 2016 West Asia Wushu Championship, where she won bronze, the 2017 Islamic Solidarity Games, where she won bronze, and the 2019 South Asian Games, where she won silver.

Her sponsorships were terminated in the 2020s, during a severe economic crisis, leaving her jobless.

== Personal life and death ==
Raza was a member of the Hazara Shi'ite minority in Pakistan. Her son was partially paralysed by a stroke in infancy, after which her husband divorced her and she became a single mother. According to her family and a teammate, when her son was three, she travelled via Iran and Turkey seeking asylum in order to obtain medical treatment and a better future for him.

On February 26, 2023, four months after leaving Pakistan, Raza died in a boat accident off the southern coast of Italy, with at least 58 other migrants, including at least one other Pakistani. According to different sources, she was either 27 or 29 years old.

== Reactions ==
The Pakistan Hockey Federation expressed their condolences to Raza's family after her death was confirmed. The Chief Minister of Balochistan also paid tribute to her. The Italian Hockey Federation also expressed their condolences.
