= Giovanni Battista Soriani =

Roman Catholic bishop

Most Reverend Giovanni Battista Soriani
- Bishop of Bisceglie
- Church: Catholic Church
- Diocese: Diocese of Bisceglie
- In office: 1576–1582
- Predecessor: Leonardo Bonaccorsi
- Successor: Nicola Secadenari

Orders
- Consecration: 2 September 1576 by Giulio Antonio Santorio

Personal details
- Died: 25 June 1582 Barletta, Italy

Giovanni Battista Soriani, O. Carm. (died 25 June 1582) was a Roman Catholic prelate who served as Bishop of Bisceglie (1576–1582).

== Biography ==
Giovanni Battista Soriani was ordained a priest in the Order of the Brothers of Our Lady of Mount Carmel. On 22 August 1576, he was appointed during the papacy of Pope Gregory XIII as Bishop of Bisceglie. On 2 September 1576, he was consecrated bishop by Giulio Antonio Santorio, Cardinal-Priest of San Bartolomeo all'Isola, with Gaspare Viviani, Bishop of Hierapetra et Sitia, and Giovanni Antonio Facchinetti de Nuce, Bishop Emeritus of Nicastro, serving as co-consecrators. He served as Bishop of Bisceglie until his death on 25 June 1582 in Barletta, Italy.

While bishop, he was the principal co-consecrator of Paolo Bellardito, Bishop of Lipari (1580).

== External links and additional sources ==
- Cheney, David M. "Diocese of Bisceglie". Catholic-Hierarchy.org. (for Chronology of Bishops) ^{[self-published]}
- Chow, Gabriel. "Diocese of Bisceglie (Italy)". GCatholic.org. (for Chronology of Bishops) ^{[self-published]}

Catholic Church titles
Preceded by Leonardo Bonaccorsi	Bishop of Bisceglie; 1576–1582	Succeeded by Nicola Secadenari
