= Thomas Goldwell =

16th-century English bishop

The Right Reverend Thomas Goldwell C.R.
- Bishop of Saint Asaph
- Church: Roman Catholic
- Diocese: St Asaph
- Appointed: 21 June 1555
- Installed: July 1555
- Term ended: 1559
- Predecessor: Robert Parfew
- Successor: Richard Davies

Orders
- Consecration: July 1555

Personal details
- Born: 1501
- Died: 3 April 1585 (aged 83–84)

Ordination history of Thomas Goldwell
History
Episcopal consecration
- Date: July 1555
Episcopal succession
Bishops consecrated by Thomas Goldwell as principal consecrator
- Giovan Battista Serbelloni: 6 April 1567
- Donat O'Gallagher: 5 November 1570
- Laurentius Bernardini: 28 September 1572
- Marco Pedacca: 6 May 1584
- Basilio Gradi: 6 May 1584

Thomas Goldwell C. R. (1501 – 3 April 1585) was an English Catholic clergyman, Bishop of Saint Asaph, the last of those Catholic bishops who had refused to accept the English Reformation.

== Life ==
Thomas Goldwell was the son of William Goldwell of Great Chart, Kent. He is thought to have studied at Canterbury College, Oxford; in January 1532 a student surnamed Goldwell was questioned concerning books in his possession which supported Catherine of Aragon, and Goldwell later referred to Richard Thornden, who was warden of that College from 1524 to 1534, as his "old friend and master". He graduated BA in 1528, MA on 17 July 1531, and BTh on 20 March 1534. While at Oxford he attained more eminence in mathematics, astronomy, and kindred sciences, than in divinity or the humanities.

He became chaplain to Reginald Pole and lived in his household in Rome, where he was appointed camerarius of the English Hospital of the Holy Trinity. Goldwell was attainted in 1539.

In 1547 he became a novice in the Theatine House of St. Paul, at Naples. On the death of Paul III, Pole brought Goldwell to Rome as his personal attendant at the conclave of 1549-50 that elected of Pope Julius III. Goldwell then returned to Naples, and made his profession as a Theatine. In 1553, while Edward VI was still reigning, an Act of General Pardon was passed, from which Goldwell was specifically excluded by name, along with Pole and others.

On Mary's accession, Pole was named papal legate to England, and Goldwell returned with him to England. In 1555 Goldwell became bishop of St Asaph, a diocese largely within Wales. While still only bishop-designate, he was sent to Rome on 2 July 1555 to report on the state of religion in England to Paul IV, and probably received his episcopal consecration in Rome at that time. He returned to England and assisted at the consecration of Pole as Archbishop of Canterbury.

Mary planned to make Goldwell Bishop of Oxford and ambassador to Rome in November 1558, and the documents were drawn up, but were not enacted due to her death. When Elizabeth came to the throne, Goldwell attended Pole's funeral by the new Queen's permission and then returned to St Asaph. He complained of not being invited, as a bishop, to her first parliament. It was alleged that, by his nomination to Oxford, he was no longer Bishop of St. Asaph; but that, as he had not done homage to the queen for Oxford, he was not yet bishop of that see. Not allowed to perform a bishop's office, say Mass, or administer the sacraments, as long as he remained in the country, by June 1559 he decided to leave England. Although the ports were being watched for him, he succeeded in making his escape.

In 1561 Goldwell became superior of the Theatines at San Silvestro al Quirinale, their house in Rome. He served as Custos of the English Hospice in Rome (now called the Venerable English College, Rome) and took part as the only English bishop at the last stages of the council of Trent, (Richard Pate, Bishop of Worcester, and Reginald Pole being at the earlier stages in the 1540s). In 1562 Goldwell was again attainted by Elizabeth's parliament. In the following year he was appointed vicar general to Carlo Borromeo, archbishop of Milan. Later, he returned to Rome, where he is known to have ordained the famous Spanish composer Tomás Luis de Victoria as a priest. In 1580, in spite of his advanced age, Goldwell set out for England at the head of the mission which included Campion and Persons, but he was taken ill at Rheims and obliged to return to Rome.

At Pentecost in 1584 he ordained to the priesthood Camillus de Lellis, the founder of the Camillians or Order of Clerks Regular, Ministers of the Sick. Camillus was subsequently canonized and became the Catholic patron Saint of the Sick, hospitals, nurses and physicians.

Goldwell died in Rome on 3 April 1585, the last surviving pre-Reformation bishop of Catholic England.

== Episcopal succession ==
During his activity as a bishop, Thomas Goldwell served as the principal consecrator of:

- Giovan Battista Serbelloni, Bishop of Cassano all'Jonio (1567);
- Donat O'Gallagher, Bishop of Killala (1570);
- Laurentius Bernardini, Titular Bishop of Coronea (1572);
- Marco Pedacca, Bishop of Lacedonia (1584);
- Basilio Gradi, Bishop of Ston (1584);

and was the principal co-consecrator of:

- Reginald Pole, Archbishop of Canterbury (1556);
- Ascanio Marchesini Titular Bishop of Maioren (1567);
- Maurice MacGibbon, Archbishop of Cashel (1567);
- Giovanni Agostino Campanile, Bishop of Minori (1567);
- Paolo Burali d'Arezzo, Bishop of Piacenza (1568);
- Organtino Scaroli, Bishop of San Marco (1569);
- Gregorio Cruz, Bishop of Martirano (1569);
- Cesare Ferrante, Bishop of Termoli (1569);
- Ludovico Madruzzo, Bishop of Trento (1570);
- Malachy O'Moloney, Bishop of Killaloe (1571);
- Guarnero Trotti, Bishop of Alessandria (1571);
- Gregorio Forbicini, Bishop of Strongoli (1572);
- Giovanni Battista Bracelli (bishop), Bishop of Luni e Sarzana (1572);
- Antonio Vialardi, Archbishop of Bourges (1572);
- Ottavio Mirto Frangipani, Bishop of Caiazzo (1572);
- Miguel Thomàs de Taxaquet, Bishop of Lérida (1577);
- Girolamo Bentivoglio, Bishop of Corneto (Tarquinia) e Montefiascone (1580); and
- Giulio Monaco, Bishop of Lucera (1580).

== Notes ==
Catholic Church titles
Preceded by Robert Warton	Bishop of St Asaph; 1554–1559	Succeeded by Richard Davies (Protestant)
