= 2023 Calabria migrant boat disaster =

Sinking of overloaded boat in Italy

- Date: 26 February 2023; 3 years ago
- Location: Ionian Sea, off the coast of Calabria, Italy; 38°55′48″N 16°54′07″E
- Type: Maritime disaster
- Cause: Weather conditions, government inaction (alleged)
- Participants: 143–200 migrants
- Outcome: 81 survivors
- Deaths: 94

On 26 February 2023, a boat carrying migrants sank amidst harsh weather conditions while trying to land on the coast of Steccato di Cutro, a seaside resort village near the town of Crotone in the region of Calabria in Southern Italy. The boat was carrying about 200 migrants when it sank, of whom at least 94 died, including at least 35 children. Eighty-one people survived.

The shipwreck was one of Italy's worst migrant boat disasters. It led to a public outcry, and following an investigation conducted by journalists, both the Italian government and the European Union (EU) border agency Frontex were accused of lying about their roles in the accident.

== Background ==
According to the International Organization for Migration, over 20,000 people have died or gone missing on the Central Mediterranean route between North Africa and Italy since 2014. According to the EU migration and asylum policy, migrants travelling from Turkey to Italy are also considered to be using the Central Mediterranean route. The Central Mediterranean route has been one of the most active despite the dangers it poses, making Italy one of the most common landing countries, although many continue on to northern European countries.

== Incident ==
A Frontex aircraft, monitoring the area as part of Operation Themis to support Italy with border control, surveillance, and search and rescue in the central Mediterranean, intercepted a ship on the evening of 25 February 2023. Frontex saw only one person on board according to the camera; other elements, such as the thermal camera recording, indicated the possibility of the presence of a large number of people. A report was immediately communicated to Italian authorities. Two patrol boats of Guardia di Finanza tried to intercept the ship but returned to port due to adverse weather and sea conditions, which was 4 out of 7 on the Douglas sea scale, meaning waves rose up to 2.50 metres (8 ft 2 in).

On 26 February 2023, the Summer Love, a boat that had set sail from İzmir, Turkey, a few days earlier, sank off the southern coast of Crotone in the Italian region of Calabria. According to the Italian news agency Adnkronos, more than 100 people were aboard the boat when it sank, and they were from Iran, Pakistan, and Afghanistan. Other local agencies mentioned that there were migrants from Iraq, Syria, and Somalia as well. The Anadolu Agency said that the boat carried "some 200 people", while survivors stated that the number was between 150 and 240.

The boat sank while attempting to land after it crashed into rocks in rough weather conditions. Video footage of the incident shows timber from the boat broken into pieces and floating along the beach. Parts of the boat's hull were also seen washing up along the seashore. An official said that wreckage was strewn along 300 metres (980 ft) of beach. Motorboats, vessels, and a helicopter were deployed to help with rescue efforts. Firefighters on jet skis were also deployed; operations were complicated due to harsh weather conditions. According to the Italian Coast Guard, 80 people were found alive.

== Victims ==
As of 13 March 2023, it was reported that at least 79 people were killed in the sinking, including 16 children, one of whom was a baby less than one year old. Eighty-one people have been rescued. The Pakistani Embassy in Rome revealed that the bodies of 28 Pakistanis had been recovered. Among the victims is Shahida Raza, a former Pakistani field hockey player, and Torpekai Amarkhel, an Afghan journalist. 54 of the survivors have been identified as Afghans, 3 were Pakistanis, a Syrian, a Tunisian, and a Palestinian.

== Investigations ==
One of the survivors was arrested on migrant trafficking charges. On 28 February 2023, Italian police arrested a Turkish man and two Pakistani nationals on grounds of people-smuggling.

Citing dissatisfaction with the official version of events, journalists from Sky News, Lighthouse Reports, Le Monde, El País, Domani, and Süddeutsche Zeitung sought to investigate why a rescue mission was not launched sooner than it was. A leaked confidential Frontex mission report obtained during the investigation revealed that a plane operated by the agency late on 25 February had spotted the boat and reported signs of distress back to the agency, as well as to the Italian authorities. Approximately an hour later, two Guardia di Finanza boats were launched to investigate the vessel; both were forced to turn back due to the bad weather, and this was communicated to the Italian Coast Guard. Despite having boats capable of operating in such conditions, a rescue operation was not attempted for approximately another four hours, or almost six hours after the boat had been first spotted. The investigation also revealed that the Frontex plane that spotted the boat had reported earlier that day that it would potentially not be possible to complete the planned flight path "due to strong winds". Following the accident, a press release attributed the plane's difficulties to a lack of fuel and made no mention of strong winds.

As of June 2023, a legal investigation into whether there were delays in the Italian authorities' response is underway in Italy. Furthermore, lawyers representing some of the families of those involved in the shipwreck are expected to present a case to the European Court of Human Rights by the end of June, arguing that Italy should be held responsible for the "irremediable violation of migrants' right to life".

== Reactions ==
=== Domestic ===
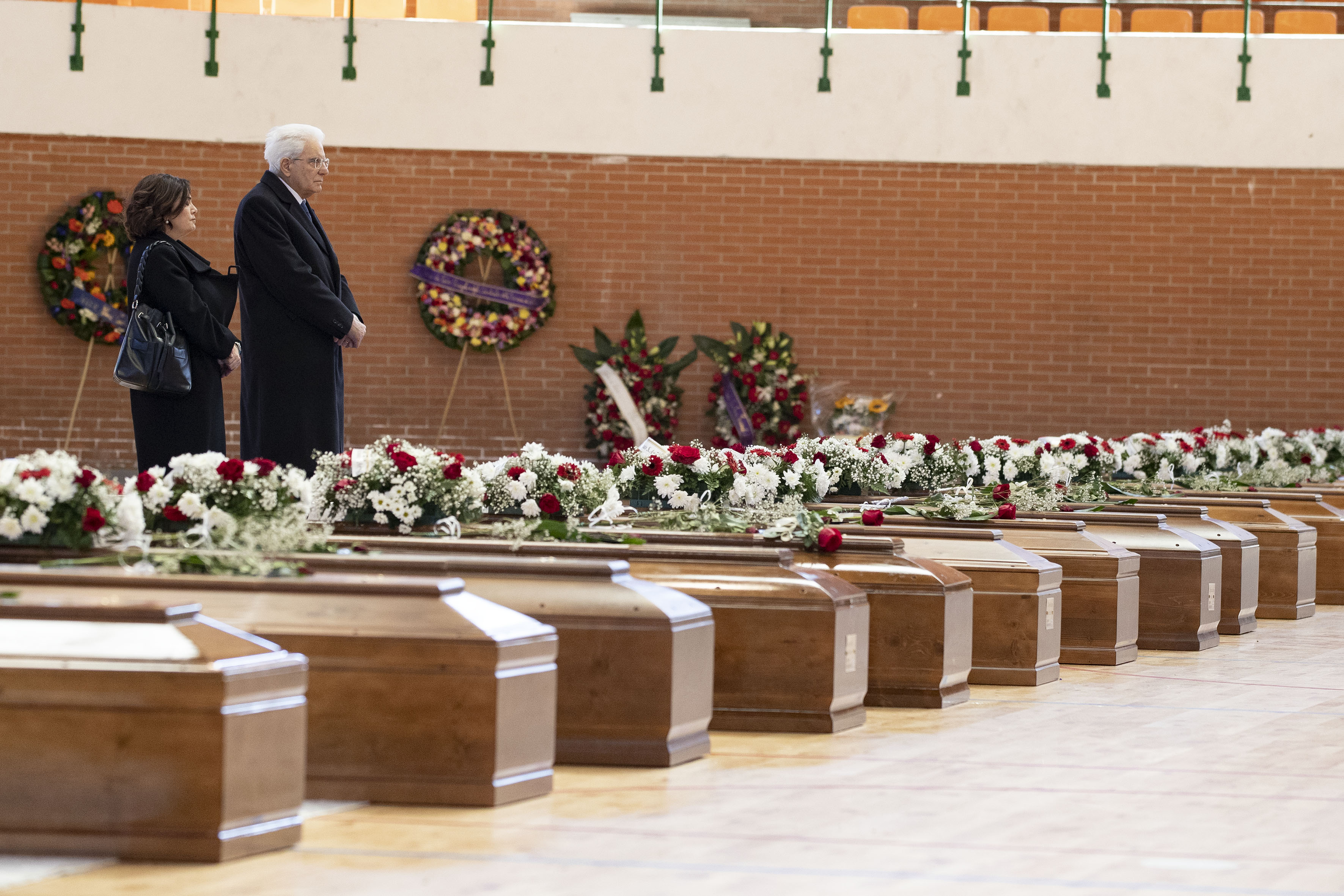
President Sergio Mattarella paying respects to the victims

Prime minister Giorgia Meloni expressed her "deep sorrow for the many human lives torn away by human traffickers", and condemned what she described as the exchange of migrants' lives for "the 'price' of a ticket paid by them in the false prospect for a safe voyage". She urged European lawmakers for change and action against migration laws to ensure these terrible events do not happen again.

Interior minister Matteo Piantedosi stressed the importance of stopping sea crossings that offer migrants what he called the "illusory mirage of a better life" in Europe. Antonio Ceraso, the mayor of Cutro, said that he saw "a spectacle that you would never want to see in your life ... stays with you for all your life." On 2 March, president Sergio Mattarella went to Crotone to pay respects to the bodies of the victims, being the first and only officeholder to do so.

Bishop Francesco Savino of Cassano all'Jolio Savino visited the rescue site and denounced "prejudices that come from other places... ideological prejudices" that prevent orderly migration even though Calabria is "a region of solidarity, welcoming and hospitable". He noted migration from the region to northern Italy far exceeded immigration to Calabria from other countries. He said: "We all become Cain to the extent that we do not feel like guardians and responsible for these immigrant brothers of ours."

On 9 March, the Meloni government had an official meeting in Cutro, in which the cabinet approved a decree introducing tougher penalties for migrant smugglers.

=== International ===
Pope Francis said that he was "praying for everyone caught up in the shipwreck" in his Sunday address at St. Peter's Square.

Shehbaz Sharif, the Pakistani prime minister, stated that more than two dozen Pakistani nationals were on the boat when it sank. Sharif said that the reports were "concerning and worrisome".

== See also ==
- List of migrant vessel incidents on the Mediterranean Sea
