= Giulio Caracciolo (archbishop of Cassano all'Jonio) =

16th-century Roman Catholic archbishop

Most Reverend Giulio Caracciolo
- Archbishop (Personal Title) of Cassano all'Jonio
- Church: Catholic Church
- Diocese: Diocese of Cassano all'Jonio
- In office: 1597–1599
- Predecessor: Owen Lewis (bishop)
- Successor: Bonifazio Caetani
- Previous post: Archbishop of Trani (1593–1597)

Personal details
- Died: 1599 Castrovillari, Italy

Giulio Caracciolo (died 1599) was a Roman Catholic prelate who served as Archbishop (Personal Title) of Cassano all'Jonio (1597–1599) and Archbishop of Trani (1593–1597).

== Biography ==
On 31 Mar 1593, Giulio Caracciolo was appointed during the papacy of Pope Clement VIII as Archbishop of Trani. On 8 Jan 1597, he was appointed during the papacy of Pope Clement VIII as Archbishop (Personal Title) of Cassano all'Jonio. He served as Archbishop of Cassano all'Jonio until his death in 1599.

== External links and additional sources ==
- Cheney, David M. "Archdiocese of Trani-Barletta-Bisceglie (-Nazareth)". Catholic-Hierarchy.org. (for Chronology of Bishops) ^{[self-published]}
- Chow, Gabriel. "Archdiocese of Trani-Barletta-Bisceglie (Italy)". GCatholic.org. (for Chronology of Bishops) ^{[self-published]}
- Cheney, David M. "Diocese of Cassano all'Jonio". Catholic-Hierarchy.org. (for Chronology of Bishops) ^{[self-published]}
- Chow, Gabriel. "Diocese of Cassano all'Jonio (Italy)". GCatholic.org. (for Chronology of Bishops) ^{[self-published]}

Catholic Church titles
Preceded by Scipione della Tolfa	Archbishop of Trani; 1593–1597	Succeeded by Andrea de Franchis
Preceded by Owen Lewis (bishop)	Archbishop (Personal Title) of Cassano all'Jonio; 1597–1599	Succeeded by Bonifazio Caetani
