= Marino Tomacelli =

Most Reverend Martino Antonio Tomacelli
- Bishop of Cassano all'Jonio
- Church: Catholic Church
- Diocese: Diocese of Cassano all'Jonio
- In office: 1491–1519
- Predecessor: Nicola Tomacelli
- Successor: Domenico Giacobazzi

Personal details
- Died: 1519 Bishop of Cassano all'Jonio, Italy

Martino Antonio Tomacelli (died 1519) was a Roman Catholic prelate who served as Bishop of Cassano all'Jonio (1491–1519).

== Biography ==
On 31 Jan 1491, Martino Antonio Tomacelli was appointed during the papacy of Pope Innocent VIII as Bishop of Cassano all'Jonio. He served as Bishop of Cassano all'Jonio until his death in 1519.

== External links and additional sources ==
- Cheney, David M. "Diocese of Cassano all'Jonio". Catholic-Hierarchy.org. (for Chronology of Bishops) ^{[self-published]}
- Chow, Gabriel. "Diocese of Cassano all'Jonio (Italy)". GCatholic.org. (for Chronology of Bishops) ^{[self-published]}

Catholic Church titles
Preceded by Nicola Tomacelli	Bishop of Cassano all'Jonio; 1491–1519	Succeeded by Domenico Giacobazzi
