= Nunzio Galantino =

Italian prelate of the Catholic Church (born 1948)

His Excellency, The Most Reverend Nunzio Galantino
- President Emeritus of the Administration of the Patrimony of the Apostolic See
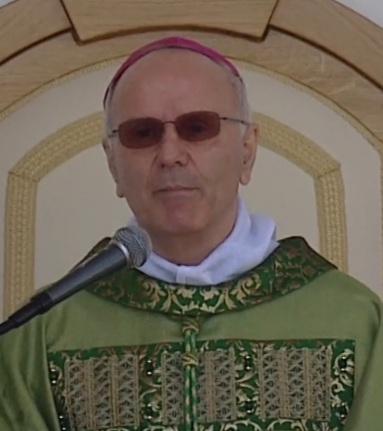
- Church: Catholic
- Appointed: 26 June 2018
- Term ended: 2 October 2023
- Predecessor: Domenico Calcagno
- Successor: Giordano Piccinotti
- Previous posts: Secretary-General of the Italian Episcopal Conference (2013–18); Bishop of Cassano all'Jonio (2012–15)

Personal details
- Born: 16 August 1948 (age 78) Cerignola, Italy
- Education: University of Bari
- Motto: Inclina cor meum in testimonia tua (Bend my heart to your instructions) (Note: Psalm 119:36)

Ordination history
History
Priestly ordination
- Ordained by: Mario Di Lieto
Episcopal consecration
- Principal consecrator: Angelo Bagnasco
- Co-consecrators: Felice di Molfetta, Vincenzo Bertolone
Episcopal succession
Bishops consecrated by Nunzio Galantino as principal consecrator
- Francesco Oliva: 2014
- Luigi Mansi: 2016

Styles of Nunzio Galantino
- Reference style: His Excellency; The Most Reverend
- Spoken style: Your Excellency
- Religious style: Bishop

Nunzio Galantino (born 16 August 1948) is an Italian prelate of the Catholic Church. He was President of the Administration of the Patrimony of the Apostolic See (APSA) from 2018 to 2023. He was the Secretary-General of the Italian Episcopal Conference (CEI) from 30 December 2013 to 26 June 2018 and Bishop of Cassano all'Jonio from 2012 to 2015.

== Biography ==
Nunzio Galantino was born in Cerignola, Italy, in 1948. He received a theology degree after studying from 1968 to 1972 at the Pontifical Regional Seminary of Benevento, Campania, and was ordained a priest of the Diocese of Ascoli Satriano e Cerignola on 23 December 1972. He earned a doctorate in philosophy from the University of Bari in 1974. From 1972 to 1977 he was Vice-Rector of the Seminary of Foggia, Italy, and Assistant of Catholic Action. In 1974 he became the Professor at the Pontifical Regional Seminary of Benevento, a post he held until 1972. From 1977 he was a priest at the parish of Saint Francis of Assisi in Cerignola. In that time he held the offices of Episcopal Vicar for Pastoral Care and for Culture and Continuing Education. From 1977 he was Professor of Anthropology at the Faculty of Theology for Southern Italy. In 2004 he became Head of National Service for the Higher Study of Theology and Religious Science at the Italian Episcopal Conference (CEI).

On 9 December 2011, Pope Benedict XVI appointed him bishop of Cassano all'Jonio. He was consecrated on 25 February 2012 in the Cathedral of St. Peter the Apostle in Cerignola by Cardinal Angelo Bagnasco. He chose as his motto Inclina cor meum in testimonia tua (Bend my heart to your instructions; Psalms 119:36). On that occasion, he asked that money ordinarily spent on gifts for him should be spent on services for the poor. While bishop he lived at the seminary rather than in the bishop's palace and eschewed the services of a secretary and chauffeur. He asked to be called "Don Nunzio" instead of the customary title "Your Excellency."

On 30 December 2013, Pope Francis named him interim Secretary General of the CEI, Pope Francis wrote to the people of Galantino's diocese to "ask permission" to give their bishop this assignment, saying: "I ask you to understand and to forgive me". (Note: Pope Francis wrote: "Per una missione importante ho bisogno che monsignor Galantino venga a Roma almeno per un periodo. So quanto voi amate il vostro vescovo e so che non vi farà piacere che vi venga tolto, e vi capisco. Per questo ho voluto scrivervi direttamente come chiedendo il permesso. Egli sicuramente preferisce rimanere con voi, perché vi ama tanto. L'affetto è reciproco, e vi confesso che vedere questo amore filiale e paterno del popolo e del vescovo mi commuove e mi fa rendere grazie a Dio. Chiederò a monsignor Galantino che, almeno per un certo tempo, pur stando a Roma, viaggi regolarmente alcuni giorni per continuare ad accompagnarvi nel cammino della fede. Vi domando, per favore, di comprendermi e di perdonarmi.") Rather than leave his diocese, Gallantino asked to be allowed to divide his time between his new post and his duties as bishop. Corriere della Sera described Galantino's appointment as the selection of someone who had not sought the appointment and said it represented a break with recent popes' political approach to the CEI, reflected Francis' emphasis on pastoral activity, and signaled his expectations for the next president of the CEI. Longtime Vatican observer John L. Allen later described the appointment as indicative of Pope Francis' management style, putting his own person in place without removing the head of the CEI and "making it so clear that [Galantino] enjoys his favor that everyone understands he's the real papal point of reference in the Italian episcopacy". On 26 March 2014, Pope Francis appointed Galantino to a full term as secretary-general.

In May 2014, in an interview about preparations for the Synod on the Family in October 2014, Bishop Galantino told the Florence-based La Nazione newspaper that he wanted church leaders to open their minds to different views: "My wish for the Italian Church is that it is able to listen without any taboo to the arguments in favour of married priests, the Eucharist for the divorced, and homosexuality." He said that "In the past we have concentrated too much on abortion and euthanasia. It mustn't be this way because in the middle there's real life which is constantly changing. I don't identify with the expressionless person who stands outside the abortion clinic reciting their rosary, but with young people, who are still against this practice, but are instead fighting for quality of life, their health, their right to work." In August 2014, he said the Church must make everyone feel at home, that "Couples in irregular matrimonial situations are also Christians, but they are sometimes looked upon with prejudice. The burden of exclusion from the Sacraments is an unjustified price to pay, in addition to de facto discrimination". He did not advocate allowing divorced Catholics who remarried to receive Communion, but said that "pastoral charity which for people facing marriage and family difficulties means acceptance, understanding, accompanying and support".

On 28 February 2015, Pope Francis accepted Galantino's resignation as bishop of Cassano all'Jonio. Francis named him President of the Administration of the Patrimony of the Apostolic See on 26 June 2018. He remained secretary general of the CEI until Francis named his successor, Stefano Russo on 28 September 2018.

Father Giordano Piccinotti succeeded him as president of APSA on 2 October 2023.

== Writings ==
- Beati quelli che non si accontentano (2016)

== Notes ==
Catholic Church titles
Preceded by Vincenzo Bertolone	Bishop of Cassano all'Jonio; 9 December 2011 – 28 February 2015	Succeeded by Francesco Savino
Preceded by Mariano Crociata	Secretary-General of the Italian Episcopal Conference; 30 December 2013 – 26 June 2018	Succeeded by Stefano Russo
Preceded by Domenico Calcagno	President of the Administration of the Patrimony of the Apostolic See; 26 June 2018 – 2 October 2023	Succeeded by Giordano Piccinotti
