= Gregorio Carafa (bishop) =

Italian Roman Catholic bishop (1588–1675)

Most Reverend Gregorio Carafa
- Archbishop of Salerno
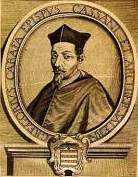
- Church: Catholic Church
- Archdiocese: Archdiocese of Salerno
- In office: 1664–1675
- Predecessor: Giovanni de Torres
- Successor: Alfonso Álvarez Barba Ossorio
- Previous post: Bishop of Cassano all'Jonio (1648–1664)

Orders
- Consecration: 20 Sep 1648 by Pier Luigi Carafa (seniore)

Personal details
- Born: 1588
- Died: 22 Feb 1675 (age 87)

Gregorio Carafa, C.R. (1588–1675) was a Roman Catholic prelate who served as Archbishop of Salerno (1664–1675) and Bishop of Cassano all'Jonio (1648–1664).

== Biography ==
Gregorio Carafa was born in 1588 in Naples, Italy and ordained a priest in the Congregation of Clerics Regular of the Divine Providence. On 24 Aug 1648, he was appointed during the papacy of Pope Innocent X as Bishop of Cassano all'Jonio. On 20 Sep 1648, he was consecrated bishop by Pier Luigi Carafa (seniore), Cardinal-Priest of Santi Silvestro e Martino ai Monti, with Fausto Caffarelli (archbishop), Archbishop of Santa Severina, and Ranuccio Scotti Douglas, Bishop of Borgo San Donnino, serving as co-consecrators. On 14 Feb 1664, he was selected as Archbishop of Salerno and confirmed by Pope Alexander VII on 23 Jun 1664. He served as Archbishop of Salerno until his death on 22 Feb 1675.

== External links and additional sources ==
- Cheney, David M. "Diocese of Cassano all'Jonio". Catholic-Hierarchy.org. (for Chronology of Bishops) ^{[self-published]}
- Chow, Gabriel. "Diocese of Cassano all'Jonio (Italy)". GCatholic.org. (for Chronology of Bishops) ^{[self-published]}
- Cheney, David M. "Archdiocese of Salerno-Campagna-Acerno". Catholic-Hierarchy.org. (for Chronology of Bishops) ^{[self-published]}
- Chow, Gabriel. "Metropolitan Archdiocese of Salerno–Campagna–Acerno (Italy)". GCatholic.org. (for Chronology of Bishops) ^{[self-published]}

Catholic Church titles
Preceded by Paolo Palombo	Bishop of Cassano all'Jonio; 1648–1664	Succeeded by Alfonso de Balmaseda
Preceded by Giovanni de Torres	Archbishop of Salerno; 1664–1675	Succeeded by Alfonso Álvarez Barba Ossorio
