= Nicola Tomacelli =

Monsignore Nicola Tomacelli
- Bishop of Cassano all'Jonio
- Church: Catholic Church
- Diocese: Diocese of Cassano all'Jonio
- In office: 1485–1490
- Predecessor: Bartolomeo del Poggio
- Successor: Marino Tomacelli

Personal details
- Died: 1490 Bishop of Cassano all'Jonio, Italy

Nicola Tomacelli (died 1490) was a Roman Catholic prelate who served as Bishop of Cassano all'Jonio (1485–1490).

== Biography ==
On 1 Sep 1485, Nicola Tomacelli was appointed during the papacy of Pope Innocent VIII as Bishop of Cassano all'Jonio. He served as Bishop of Cassano all'Jonio until his death in 1490.

== External links and additional sources ==
- Cheney, David M. "Diocese of Cassano all'Jonio". Catholic-Hierarchy.org. (for Chronology of Bishops) ^{[self-published]}
- Chow, Gabriel. "Diocese of Cassano all'Jonio (Italy)". GCatholic.org. (for Chronology of Bishops) ^{[self-published]}

Catholic Church titles
Preceded by Bartolomeo del Poggio	Bishop of Cassano all'Jonio; 1485–1490	Succeeded by Marino Tomacelli
