= Agenzia S.I.R. =

Italian Catholic news agency

- Industry: News agency
- Founded: 1988; 38 years ago
- Founder: Episcopal Conference of Italy
- Headquarters: Rome, Italy
- Website: www.agensir.it

Agenzia S.I.R., also Agenzia Sir, AgenSir or AgenSIR, is the news agency of the Italian Catholic Church. S.I.R. stands for "Servizio Informazione Religiosa" (Religious Information Service).

== History and mission ==
The agency was established in 1988 by the Italian Federation of Catholic Weeklies, with support from the Italian Episcopal Conference (CEI). Its first weekly publication, dated 13 January 1989, outlined the agency's commitment to providing objective and rigorous religious journalism, avoiding ideological or partisan biases. In line with Catholic journalistic traditions, it seeks to promote understanding of religious matters by highlighting their roots and significance.

Initially a weekly publication, SIR became biweekly in 1990. Adopting new technologies, it began distributing news via email and fax in 1994 and launched its website on 20 September 1995, making it one of Italy's pioneering Catholic web services. The site underwent several updates.

AgenSir provides information not only to media professionals but also to individuals engaged in pastoral, cultural, social, and political responsibilities. Its content encompasses CEI pastoral bodies, Italian dioceses, associations, volunteering, institutional activities, and Church documents. By offering an alternative to secular media's ideological narratives, AgenSir aims to uphold truth and freedom in religious reporting. Its website serves as a central platform for its publications.
