= Francesco Savino =

Italian Catholic bishop (born 1954)

- Bishop of Cassano all'Jonio
- Appointed: 28 February 2015
- Predecessor: Nunzio Galantino

Orders
- Ordination: 24 August 1978 by Aurelio Marena
- Consecration: 2 May 2015 by Francesco Cacucci

Personal details
- Born: 13 November 1954 (age 71)
- Motto: Charitas Christi Urget Nos
- Coat of arms: Francesco Savino's coat of arms

Francesco Savino (born 13 November 1954) is an Italian prelate of the Catholic Church who has been bishop of Cassano all'Jonio since 2015. In May 2022, he was elected a vice president of the Italian Episcopal Conference. He is known familiarly as "Don Ciccio".

== Early life and career ==
Francesco Savino was born on 13 November 1954 in Bitonto near Bari. He completed high school there in 1973 and then entered the Pontifical Regional Seminary of Puglia in Molfetta. On 24 August 1978, he was ordained a priest for the Diocese of Ruvo e Bitonto (Note: With the reorganization of ecclesiastical jurisdictions, he served the Diocese of Ruvo e Bitonto from 1978 to 1983, the Diocese of Bitonto from 1983 to 1986, and the Archdiocese of Bari-Bitonto from 1986 to 2015.) by Bishop Aurelio Marena. While fulfilling assignments as a priest he continued his studies, completing a bachelor's degree in theology in 1992 and earning his licentiate in theology in 2000. In March 2000, he obtained his licentiate in anthropology.

Savino taught religion in several schools and at the minor seminary. He focused particularly on youth programs and was given responsibility for diocesan youth programs. He was parish vicar of San Silvestro-Crocifisso from 1978 to 1985. On 20 January 1985, he was appointed parish priest of Cristo Re Universale parish in Bitonto, where he served until 1989. He developed numerous outreach programs and was soon made head of Bitonto's Caritas program. For his Diocese, he served as a member of the college of consultants and the priests council. He was also a member of the Commission on Palliative Care of the local government's Ministry of Health.

On 2 October 1989, Savino was appointed rector of the parish-sanctuary Santi Medici Cosma e Damiano, centered on the Basilica of the Holy Doctors Cosmas and Damian, an important center for religious tourism which houses the relics of its namesake patrons. (Note: The basilica was constructed in the 1970s to house the relics as an alternative to the church of Saint George in the city's historic center.) He created liturgical events for the patronal feasts and developed a program of catechesis with special attention on children at risk. He opened a listening center, a homeless shelter, and a soup kitchen. In November 1993, he established a non-profit organization to manage these initiatives, the Opera Santi Medici Cosma e Damiano – Bitonto – Onlus, (Note: "Onlus" is an acronym for Organizzazione non lucrativa di utilità sociale or 'socially beneficial non-profit organization'.) which in turn created a hospice and palliative care center. Other initiatives attacked loan sharks and organized an anti-drug family association. He served as director of the quarterly magazine Eco dei Santi Medici, (Note: This magazine was published from 2008 to 2017, and its archives are available online.) and also directed the series Scrigni/contenuti preziose su foglie leggeri.

== Bishop of Cassano all'Jonio ==
On 28 February 2015, Pope Francis appointed him Bishop of Cassano all'Jonio. He received his episcopal consecration on 2 May 2015 in the forecourt of the Basilica of the Holy Doctors Cosmos and Damian, where he had been rector since 1989, from Archbishop Francesco Cacucci of Bari-Bitonto, with Bishops Nunzio Galantino and Gastone Simoni as co-consecrators. He was installed in Cassano all'Jonio on 31 May. He was a member of the Episcopal Commission for the Service of Charity and Health of the Italian Episcopal Conference and a delegate of the Calabrian Episcopal Conference for the Pastoral Care of Health, Migration, and Charity.

On 15 February 2019, the University of Bari awarded him an honorary degree in medicine and surgery. The rector said that "in his religious experience, in his social commitment, [Savino] was able to place humanity, and especially those in need, at the center... He taught us to learn to suffer, to distrust shortcuts". He cited his work to create a shelter for AIDS patients and a palliative care center for cancer patients. On 25 May 2022, Savino was elected to a five-year term as vice president for Southern Italy of the Italian Episcopal Conference. In June 2022, he visited Odessa on behalf of the Italian Episcopal Conference as part of a "caravan for peace" to appeal for dialogue between Ukraine and Russia and to express solidarity with victims of aggression. He said: "We all agree on one thing, to insist that we don't become accustomed to the conflict and that indifference does not prevail."

Following a shipwreck off the Calabrian coast in February 2023 that killed almost a hundred seeking to migrate to Italy, Savino visited the rescue site and denounced "prejudices that come from other places... ideological prejudices" that prevent orderly migration even though Calabria is "a region of solidarity, welcoming and hospitable". He noted migration from the region to northern Italy far exceeded immigration to Calabria from other countries. He said: "We all become Cain to the extent that we do not feel like guardians and responsible for these immigrant brothers of ours." Savino delivered the homily at a Mass celebrated on 6 September 2025 at the Church of the Gesù for a congregation of LGBT Catholic pilgrims gathered in Rome to participate in the 2025 Jubilee. (Note: He said Pope Leo had approved of his participation, "with great tenderness, with great sweetness". The pilgrimage, led by the Italian organization Tenda di Gionata was listed in the Holy See's calendar of events.) To extended applause he said: "The Jubilee was the time to free the oppressed and restore dignity to those who had been denied it. Brothers and sisters, I say this with emotion: It is time to restore dignity to everyone, especially to those who have been denied it."

== Writings ==
- Savino, Francesco (2017). Spiritualità e Politica. Aldo Moro, Giorgio La Pira, Giuseppe Lazzati (in Italian). Terlizzi: Editions Insieme. ISBN 8876022651.
