= Pedro Torres (bishop) =

Most Reverend Pedro Torres
- Auxiliary Bishop of Cassano all'Jonio
- Church: Catholic Church
- Archdiocese: Diocese of Cassano all'Jonio
- In office: 1540–1544?

Pedro Torres was a Roman Catholic prelate who served as Auxiliary Bishop of Cassano all'Jonio (1540–1544?)

== Biography ==
On 27 Aug 1540, Pedro Torres was appointed during the papacy of Pope Paul III as Auxiliary Bishop of Cassano all'Jonio and Titular Bishop of Albanen. While bishop, he was the principal co-consecrator of Bartolomé de las Casas, Bishop of Chiapas (1544).
