= Conspiracy of Macchia =

Three-day uprising in Naples in 1701

The Conspiracy of Macchia (Italian: Congiura di Macchia) was a three-day uprising occurring in Naples in 1701, immediately after the ascension of the first Bourbon monarch to the Spanish throne, an event that precipitated the War of the Spanish Succession. In this short revolt, Neapolitan nobles attempted to seize control of the kingdom from the Spanish viceroy, but failed.

== Uprising ==
After the death of the Habsburg Charles II of Spain, a number of noble families of Naples did not favor transferring allegiance to the new Bourbon King, Philip V, and formed a conspiracy to transfer the rule instead to a king from the family of the Austrian Habsburg monarch Leopold I. Some perhaps hoped in the process to acquire more power for themselves. In addition, there was also some distaste among the nobility for the present Spanish viceroy, Luis Francisco de la Cerda, Duke of Medinaceli.
The Austrian monarchy aided such machinations by releasing to Italy two of their Italian mercenary soldiers, Giovanni Carafa della Spina and Giuseppe Capece brother of the Marchese di Rofrano, joined by Don Carlo di Sangro (Prince of Sansevero). In Rome, by 1701 they were joined by Gaetano Gambacorta, Prince of Macchia, who had till then lead Neapolitan troops fighting for Spanish crown in Catalonia. He disguised his trip to Rome with the excuse of addressing some pressing family issues.

In Rome, the Prince of Macchia hoped to have troops of Prince Eugene of Savoy, allies of the Habsburgs, move with him to Naples. The Duke of Medinaceli, through spies, became aware of the conspiracy, and blocked the entry of foreigners to Naples. By then in Naples and aware that the viceroy would soon react, the Prince of Macchia, Prince of Chiusano, Tiberio Carafa, and Giuseppe Carafa joined with the Princes of Caserta and Riccia. On September 21, 1701, these nobles took to the streets calling for the Habsburg Archduke Charles (second son of Leopold) to become King of Naples.

Arriving to the lower-class neighborhood of Mercato, the assembled populace showed little interest in a revolution to overthrow the Spanish rule. They reminded Gambacorta that when Masaniello and the common people had led a revolution in 1647 against the Spanish Habsburgs, the nobility had not supported the revolution. So why, they asked through their representatives, should the people support the nobility now.

After gaining some adherents, the conspirators were able to capture and open the jail at Vicaria, and capture some of the neighborhoods near San Pietro a Majella and Mercatella. But when the Prince of Macchia (Gambacorta) prohibited the sacking of private houses by his mobs, many of them lost interest in the effort.

By the third day, confronting the superior artillery of the Viceroy, the revolt had fizzled. Giuseppe Capace was killed while fleeing. Carlo De Sangro was captured and executed. Gambacorta was able to flee to Vienna, but all his estates were confiscated, and he died in a few years from illness.

The conspiracy seemed condemned to folly when the Austrian monarchs were unable to provide the needed military to support the rebellion. However, the Austrian rule of Naples came about anyhow 12 years later, be it only for two decades. In 1713, the Peace of Utrecht had granted the rule of Naples to the Habsburg emperor Charles VI, but by 1734, the territory had been reconquered by the armies of the future Charles III of Spain, who then left the kingdom to Ferdinand I of the Two Sicilies.
