= Bonifazio Caetani =

Roman Catholic cardinal

His Eminence Bonifazio Caetani
- Cardinal-Priest of Santa Pudenziana; Archbishop of Taranto
- Church: Catholic Church

Personal details
- Born: 1566 Rome, Italy
- Died: 24 Jun 1617 (age 50) Rome, Italy

Bonifazio Caetani (1567–1617) was a Roman Catholic cardinal.

== Episcopal succession ==
While bishop, he was the principal consecrator of:

- Bartolomeo Cesi (cardinal), Archbishop of Conza (1608);
- Pier Paolo Crescenzi, Bishop of Rieti (1612);
- Nicola Antonio Spinelli, Bishop of Alessano (1612);
- Cesare Ventimiglia, Bishop of Terracina, Priverno e Sezze (1615);
- Giovanni Battista Lancellotti, Bishop of Nola (1615); and
- Tommaso Brandolini, Bishop of Minori (1615).

Catholic Church titles
Preceded by Giulio Caracciolo	Bishop of Cassano all'Jonio; 1599–1613	Succeeded by Diego de Arce
Preceded by Innocenzo Del Bufalo-Cancellieri	Cardinal-Priest of Santa Pudenziana; 1607–1617	Succeeded by Roberto Ubaldini
Preceded by Ottavio Mirto Frangipani	Archbishop of Taranto; 1613–1617	Succeeded by Antonio d'Aquino
