= WAPDA Sports Complex =

Multi-sport complex in Lahore, Pakistan

Coordinates: 31°26′48″N 74°21′9″E

- Location: Kot Lakhpat, Lahore, Punjab, Pakistan
- Owner: Water and Power Development Authority
- Operator: WAPDA Sports Board

Construction
- Built: 1987–2002 (first phase)
- Cost: Rs400 million (first phase)

The WAPDA Sports Complex is a multi-sport complex in the Kot Lakhpat area of Lahore, Punjab, Pakistan. Owned by the Water and Power Development Authority, it serves as the operational headquarters of the WAPDA Sports Board. The complex contains indoor and outdoor competition and training facilities, residential accommodation for athletes, and a swimming pool.

== History ==
Construction of the complex began in 1987 on a site in Kot Lakhpat close to a WAPDA grid station. Work stopped twice before accelerating in 1999, and the first phase was completed in 2002. It covered more than 37,000 m^{2} (9.1 acres) and cost approximately 400 million pakistani rupees.

The first phase comprised an indoor gymnasium, a multipurpose outdoor ground with a main enclosure, and an 18-room hostel capable of accommodating 72 athletes and officials. Soon after the phase was completed, the complex hosted national athletics and boxing championships and table-tennis matches between Pakistan and China.

In 2003, WAPDA planned a second phase budgeted at 65 million rupees, comprising a swimming pool, floodlighting for the main ground and equipment for different sports. A site beside the athletics track and sports hostel was approved for the pool in October 2003, after an alternative site facing Ferozepur Road was rejected. WAPDA announced construction of the pool in April 2004 for athlete training and national and international competitions.

== Facilities ==
WAPDA Sports Complex facilities include:

- main ground or stadium used for athletics, baseball, cricket, football, handball and outdoor sports
- indoor gymnasium used for badminton, bodybuilding, martial arts, gymnastics, table tennis, volleyball and weightlifting
- 50-metre swimming pool, warm-up pool and spectator seating
- basketball court
- fitness club
- an 18-room sports hostel.

== Events and use ==
The complex has hosted national and international competitions in several sports. Two group-stage matches of the 2007 AFC President's Cup were initially allocated to its outdoor ground, with the remaining matches played at Punjab Stadium. In 2008 it hosted an international table tennis tournament.

It has hosted several National Badminton Championships, National Basketball Championships, National Volleyball Championship. It has also hosted several editions of the National Women's Football Championship.

In 2025, it hosted a three-nation kabaddi competition involving Pakistan, India and Iran.

Some successor electricity companies maintain separately named facilities elsewhere, including the MEPCO Sports Complex at MEPCO headquarters in Multan and the FESCO Sports Complex in Faisalabad.

== See also ==
- WAPDA F.C.
- Water and Power Development Authority cricket team
- List of stadiums in Pakistan
