= Torpekai Amarkhel =

Afghan journalist (1981–2023)

- تورپیکای آمرخېل
- Born: 4 April 1981
- Died: 26 February 2023 (aged 41); Off Steccato di Cutro, Calabria, Italy
- Cause of death: Drowning
- Education: Kabul University
- Occupations: Journalist; photojournalist
- Employers: Radio Television Afghanistan; United Nations Assistance Mission in Afghanistan; SBS Pashto

Torpekai Amarkhel (Pashto: تورپیکای آمرخېل; 4 April 1981 – 26 February 2023) was an Afghan journalist, known for her work documenting the experiences of women in Afghanistan for Radio Television Afghanistan, the United Nations, and SBS Pashto. Amarkhel fled Afghanistan following the fall of Kabul in 2021, and drowned in the 2023 Calabria migrant boat disaster while trying to seek asylum in Europe.

== Career ==
Amarkhel studied journalism at Kabul University. Following the fall of the Taliban regime in 2002, she joined a newly-established all-women news team at Radio Television Afghanistan, the country's public broadcasting organisation. Amarkhel advocated for women journalists not to wear the burqa while giving interviews. During her time at RTA, she also collaborated with the United Nations Assistance Mission in Afghanistan, contributing to its strategic communication and spokesperson unit and serving as host of its news programme Afghanistan Today until 2013. Amarkhel also worked as an international contributor for the Australian news channel SBS' Pashto-language service from its inception in 2013 until 2016.

Later in her career, Amarkhel shifted to photojournalism, in addition to advocating for the rights and safety of women journalists working in Afghanistan. Her photographs, often documenting the daily lives of Aghan women, were published by the United Nations.

== Death ==
Following the fall of Kabul in 2021 and the re-establishment of a Taliban government, Amarkhel was no longer able to work or go outside without a veil. She reportedly expressed concern to friends that she would be forcibly married to a Taliban fighter, due to her status as an unmarried Pashtun woman. Amarkhel subsequently fled Afghanistan, entering Iran on foot before travelling on to Istanbul, Turkey.

Despite working for the United Nations, Amarkhel did not receive support from the organisation in her attempts to flee Afghanistan. Through her connections with SBS Pashto, she had made an asylum claim with the Australian government, though this remained in process at the time of her death. Frustrated at delays, Amarkhel and her family decided to try to claim asylum in Europe, and travelled to Izmir in order to travel on the gulet Summer Love to Italy. The boat departed Izmir on 22 February 2023.

Amarkhel died on 26 February 2023 when Summer Love capsized off the coast of Steccato di Cutro in Calabria. Her cousin Basira, Basira's husband Samiullah, and their three children (also described in some media reports as being Amarkhel's children) all died in the disaster, alongside at least 88 other migrants. Amarkhel was 43 at the time of her death. Her sister Mida, who lived in the Netherlands, travelled to Crotone to identify her family's bodies, and publicly sought justice for the victims of the disaster.

The Italian Order of Journalists subsequently dedicated 8 March 2023 in memory of Amarkhel.
