= Diego de Arce =

Spanish Roman Catholic prelate

Monsignore Diego de Arce
- Bishop of Cassano all'Jonio
- Church: Catholic Church
- Diocese: Diocese of Cassano all'Jonio
- Predecessor: Bonifazio Caetani
- Successor: Paolo Palombo

Personal details
- Born: 1554 Madrid, Spain
- Died: 1617 (age 63) Cassano all'Jonio, Italy

Diego de Arce (1554–1617) was a Roman Catholic prelate who served as Bishop of Cassano all'Jonio (1614–1617).

== Biography ==
Giovanni Battista Lanfranchi was born in Madrid, Spain in 1554 and ordained a priest in the Order of Friars Minor. On 17 Feb 1614, he was appointed during the papacy of Pope Paul V as Bishop of Cassano all'Jonio. He served as Bishop of Cassano all'Jonio until his death in 1617.

== External links and additional sources ==
- Cheney, David M. "Diocese of Cassano all'Jonio". Catholic-Hierarchy.org. (for Chronology of Bishops) ^{[self-published]}
- Chow, Gabriel. "Diocese of Cassano all'Jonio (Italy)". GCatholic.org. (for Chronology of Bishops) ^{[self-published]}

Catholic Church titles
Preceded by Bonifazio Caetani	Bishop of Cassano all'Jonio; 1614-1617	Succeeded by Paolo Palombo
