= Abiha Haider =

Pakistani footballer (born 1996)

Personal information
- Date of birth: 23 February 1996 (age 30)
- Height: 5 ft 5 in (1.65 m)
- Position: Midfielder

Team information
- Current team: Balochistan United

Senior career*
Years	Team	Apps	(Gls)
2008–2013	Margalla Women FC (Islamabad)	36	(41)
2014–2020	Balochistan United	6	(3)
2021-present	Highlanders		
Total		42	(44)

International career^{‡}
2010-present	Pakistan	15	
- * Club domestic league appearances and goals as of 21:55, 29 January 2022 (UTC) ‡ National team caps and goals as of 21:55, 29 January 2022 (UTC)

Abiha Haider (born 23 February 1996) is a Pakistani footballer who plays as a midfielder for Balochistan United and the Pakistan women's national football team. She was also the captain of Pakistan's Australian Football League team which competed in the 2017 Australian Football International Cup.

In 2020, she was featured in the list of 30 Most Powerful Muslim Women in Sports. She is also a part of Pakistan's National Youth Council.

== Football career ==
=== Domestic career ===
At the age of 12, Abiha represented Islamabad at the 2008 National Women Football Championship. In the 2010 National Women Football Championship, she scored two goals in a 4–3 comeback win in the final group stage match against Diya which helped her team top its group and progress to the quarterfinals. She represented Islamabad at six National Championships till 2013, scoring 41 goals in 36 appearances.

Abiha moved to Balochistan United in 2014. At the 10th National Women Football Championship, she scored three goals as her new team went on to win their maiden national title.

In 2021, Abiha joined Highlanders, and represented them at the 13th National Women Football Championship. In the first group match, she scored twice in a 16–0 win over Nawanshehr United.

=== International career ===
Abiha was the youngest player to represent Pakistan when, at the age of 13, she took part in the football event at the 2010 South Asian Games in Dhaka. She subsequently represented Pakistan at the 2010, 2012, and the 2014 SAFF Women's Championships. She was also part of the squad that visited Bahrain for a three-match friendly series against the Bahrain women's national football team.

In 2019, Abiha was part of two Guinness World Records entries when she participated in a football match that lasted 69 hours during the 2019 FIFA Women's World Cup in France. The event took place in Lyon and involved 807 players from 53 countries.

== Personal life ==
Abiha's father, Masood Haider, was a footballer who played at Punjab level, while her mother, Zara, was a former hockey player as well as a television newscaster. Abiha has a LLB (Hons) and an LL.M. degree from the University of London.

== Honours ==
=== Balochistan United ===
- National Women Football Championship: 2014

=== Individual ===
- 30 Most Powerful Muslim Women in Sports
- 25 under 25 Extraordinary Young Women of Pakistan
- Guinness World Records: Most nationalities in a football (soccer) exhibition match
