= Giovan Battista Serbelloni =

Most Reverend Giovan Battista Serbelloni
- Bishop of Cassano all'Jonio
- Church: Catholic Church
- Diocese: Roman Catholic Diocese of Cassano all'Jonio
- In office: 1561–1579
- Predecessor: Mark Sittich von Hohenems
- Successor: Tiberio Carafa

Orders
- Consecration: 6 Apr 1567 by Thomas Goldwell

Giovan Battista Serbelloni was a Roman Catholic prelate who served as Bishop of Cassano all'Jonio (1561–1579).

== Biography ==
On 17 Dec 1561, Giovan Battista Serbelloni was appointed Bishop of Cassano all'Jonio by Pope Pius IV. On 6 Apr 1567, he was consecrated bishop by Thomas Goldwell, Bishop of Saint Asaph, with Ippolito Capilupo, Bishop Emeritus of Fano, and Ventura Buralini, Bishop of Massa Marittima, serving as co-consecrators.

He served as Bishop of Cassano all'Jonio until his resignation in 1579.

While bishop, he was the principal consecrator of Giuliano de' Medici (bishop), Bishop of Béziers (1567).

== External links and additional sources ==
- Cheney, David M. "Diocese of Cassano all'Jonio". Catholic-Hierarchy.org. (for Chronology of Bishops) ^{[self-published]}
- Chow, Gabriel. "Diocese of Cassano all'Jonio (Italy)". GCatholic.org. (for Chronology of Bishops) ^{[self-published]}

Catholic Church titles
Preceded by Mark Sittich von Hohenems	Bishop of Cassano all'Jonio; 1561–1579	Succeeded by Tiberio Carafa
