= Joyann Thomas =

Pakistani footballer (born 1998)

Joyann Thomas جویان تھامس
Personal information
- Full name: Joyann Geraldine Thomas
- Date of birth: 9 November 1998 (age 27)
- Place of birth: Karachi, Pakistan
- Height: 1.70 m (5 ft 7 in)
- Position: Defender

Team information
- Current team: Balochistan United
- Number: 16

Youth career
- Laurentian Football Club

Senior career*
Years	Team	Apps	(Gls)
	Balochistan United	5	(2)

International career^{‡}
2014–	Pakistan	3	(0)
- * Club domestic league appearances and goals as of 14:07, 13 February 2016 (UTC) ‡ National team caps and goals as of 14:07, 13 February 2016 (UTC)

Joyann Geraldine Thomas (Urdu: جویان جیرالڈائن تھامس; born 9 November 1998) is a Pakistani footballer. She plays as a defender for the national team as well as for her club, Balochistan United. She is the first female Christian to play football for Pakistan.

== Early life and education ==
Thomas was born to Joyce Christina, who was a national gold medallist in the 1500 m event. Thomas is a Roman Catholic and completed her schooling from St. Joseph's Convent School in Karachi.

== Career ==
Thomas started her youth career from Laurentian Football Club in Garden East neighbourhood of Karachi. There, she trained under coach Khayyam Juma. She represents Balochistan United at the domestic level.

=== National team ===
Thomas made her debut for the national team at the 3rd SAFF Women's Championship held in Islamabad in November 2014, where she played in all three of Pakistan's games.

== Honours ==
- National Women Football Championship: 2014
