= Nino Nini =

Roman Catholic bishop

Most Reverend Nino Nini
- Bishop of Potenza
- Church: Catholic Church
- Diocese: Diocese of Potenza
- In office: 1526–1564
- Predecessor: Pompeo Colonna
- Successor: Tiberio Carafa

Personal details
- Died: 21 January 1564 Potenza, Italy

Nino Nini (died 21 January 1564) was a Roman Catholic prelate who served as Bishop of Potenza (1526–1564).

== Biography ==
On 28 Nov 1526, Nino Nini was appointed by Pope Clement VII as Bishop of Potenza. He served as Bishop of Potenza until his death on 21 Jan 1564.

== External links and additional sources ==
- Cheney, David M. "Archdiocese of Potenza-Muro Lucano-Marsico Nuovo". Catholic-Hierarchy.org. (for Chronology of Bishops) ^{[self-published]}
- Chow, Gabriel. "Metropolitan Archdiocese of Potenza–Muro Lucano–Marsico Nuovo (Italy)". GCatholic.org. (for Chronology of Bishops) ^{[self-published]}

Catholic Church titles
Preceded by Pompeo Colonna	Bishop of Potenza; 1526–1564	Succeeded by Tiberio Carafa
