= List of Pakistan international footballers =

This is a list of Pakistan international footballers, who have played for the Pakistan national football team since its foundation in 1950. Players with 30 or more official caps are listed here.

== Players ==
- **Bold** denotes players still playing international football.

As of match played 2 October 2026

Pakistan national team footballers with at least 30 appearances
No.	Name	National career	Caps	Goals	Ref.
1	Haroon Yousaf	1992–2003	49	3	
2	Jaffar Khan	2001–2013	47	0	
3	Zafar Iqbal	1985–1995	45	1	
4	Samar Ishaq	2006–2013	44	3	
5	Muhammad Essa	2001–2009	40	11	
5	Muhammad Tariq Hussain	1987–2003	40	0	
7	**Yousuf Butt**	2012–present	36	0	
8	Muhammad Umer	1956–1965	35	18	
8	Abdul Ghafoor	1959–1974	35	3	
8	Abdullah Rahi	1959–1967	35	3	
11	Tanveer Ahmed	1999–2008	32	3	
11	Sharafat Ali	1984–1992	32	12	
13	Abid Hussain Ghazi	1956–1964	30	0	
13	Qazi Ashfaq	1989–1997	30	4	

Note. Exact figures of old long-serving players such as Muhammad Umer, Abdul Ghafoor, Abdullah Rahi & Abid Hussain Ghazi, who are likely to have accumulated between 30 and 40 caps, are not yet known and yet to be researched. Additionally, player appearances are also missing in the 2000 AFC Asian Cup qualification, two of the 2002 friendly matches against Sri Lanka, 2005 Islamic Solidarity Games match against Malaysia, and 2006 friendly against Palestine in the primary source and yet to be updated.

== See also ==
- List of Pakistan international footballers born outside Pakistan
- List of Pakistan women's international footballers
