= Roman Catholic Diocese of Sitia =

The Diocese of Sitia (Latin: Dioecesis Sythiensis) was a Roman Catholic diocese located in the city of Sitia on the island of Crete when it was under Venetian rule. On 16 July 1571, it was suppressed and united with the Diocese of Hierapetra to form the Diocese of Hierapetra et Sitia.

== Ordinaries ==
=== Diocese of Sitia ===
Metropolitan: Archdiocese of Candia

- Gaspare Viviani (17 Jul 1556 – 16 Jul 1571 Appointed, Bishop of Hierapetra et Sitia)
