= Gaspare Viviani =

Italian Roman Catholic prelate

Most Reverend Gaspare Viviani
- Bishop of Anagni
- Church: Catholic Church
- Diocese: Diocese of Anagni
- In office: 1579–1605
- Predecessor: Benedetto Lomellini
- Successor: Vittorio Guarini
- Previous posts: Bishop of Sitia (1556–1571); Bishop of Hierapetra et Sitia (1571–1579)

Personal details
- Died: 25 January 1605 Anagni, Italy

Gaspare Viviani (died 25 January 1605) was a Roman Catholic prelate who served as Bishop of Anagni (1579–1605), Bishop of Hierapetra et Sitia (1571–1579), and Bishop of Sitia (1556–1571).

== Biography ==
On 17 July 1556, Gaspare Viviani was appointed during the papacy of Pope Paul IV as Bishop of Sitia. On 16 July 1571, he was appointed during the papacy of Pope Pius V as Bishop of Hierapetra et Sitia. On 3 August 1579, he was appointed during the papacy of Pope Gregory XIII as Bishop of Anagni. He served as Bishop of Anagni until his death on 25 January 1605.

== Episcopal succession ==
While bishop, he was the principal co-consecrator of:

- Giovanni Battista Soriani, Bishop of Bisceglie (1576);
- Giovanni Battista Ansaldo, Bishop of Cariati e Cerenzia (1576);
- Giovanni Bernardino Grandopoli, Bishop of Lettere-Gragnano (1576);
- Miguel Thomàs de Taxaquet, Bishop of Lérida (1577); and
- Mario Bolognini, Archbishop of Lanciano (1579).

== External links and additional sources ==
- Cheney, David M. "Diocese of Anagni-Alatri". Catholic-Hierarchy.org. (for Chronology of Bishops)^{self-published}
- Chow, Gabriel. "Diocese of Anagni-Alatri (Italy)". GCatholic.org. (for Chronology of Bishops)^{self-published}

Catholic Church titles
Preceded by	Bishop of Sitia; 1556–1571	Succeeded by
Preceded by Nicolaus Bertholdi	Bishop of Hierapetra et Sitia; 1571–1579	Succeeded by Alexander de Turre
Preceded by Benedetto Lomellini	Bishop of Anagni; 1579–1605	Succeeded by Vittorio Guarini
