= Tiberio Carafa (1669–1742) =

Neapolitan aristocrat

Tiberio Carafa (1669–1742) was a Neapolitan aristocrat and man of letters. He remained loyal to the Habsburgs throughout the War of the Spanish Succession (1701–1715) and the War of the Polish Succession (1733–1735). A member of the Carafa family, he succeeded his father as the Prince of Chiusano in 1711.

== Life ==
Carafa was born at Chiusano on 27 January 1669 to Prince Fabrizio Carafa and Beatrice della Leonessa. He received his primary education in Chiusano before being sent to study the art of chivalry in Naples. On 10 May 1692, at the insistence of his father, he married the twice-widowed Giovanna Carafa, primarily for economic reasons. He moved in with his wife in Campolieto.

In September 1701, following the accession of Philip of Bourbon, Carafa played the leading part in the Conspiracy of Macchia. He delivered the conspirators' demand for the restoration of the parliament and of the seven great offices of state. The chief influences on his political thinking were the Jesuit Francisco María Torres and the traditionalist Tommaso Strozzi. After the failure of the conspiracy, he fled to Venice and thence joined the imperial army under Eugene of Savoy.

Carafa took part in the battle of Cremona, the siege of Mantua and the battle of Luzzara in 1702. He spent much of the next two years in Vienna and Hungary. In 1703, he seriously injured Bartolomeo Ceva Grimaldi in a duel in Vienna. In 1704, he took part in the siege of Landau. He returned to Naples with the army of Wirich Philipp von Daun in 1707. He brought news of the conquest to Charles of Habsburg, then in Barcelona, and urged him to concentrate on securing Naples over conquering Spain. Charles named him a grandee of Spain and awarded him a pension.

Carafa returned to Naples in 1708. He inherited his father's title and fief in 1711. He was also a patron of the theatre. He sponsored La Cilla by Francesco Antonio Tullio and Michelangelo Faggioli, the first commedia per musica, in his own home in 1707. He constructed the Teatro della Pace in 1723. Its first performance was Leonardo Vinci's La mogliere fedele in 1724. The Teatro, however, was a source of controversy in the city, especially with the church.

Having trouble receiving his full pension, Carafa travelled to Vienna in 1724 without success. At the outbreak of war in 1733, he urged a vigorous defence of the kingdom. Appointed vicar general of the province of Principato Ultra in December 1733 and subsequently governor of Terra di Bari. Unable to defend either in the face of a Bourbon invasion, he fled the kingdom a second time for Venice and Vienna in May 1734. His estates were seized by the new Bourbon government.

In 1734, Carafa's wife died. In 1741, he married Maria Giuseppa Pinelli. He had no children by either wife, but one illegitimate daughter, Maria Anna. Carafa died in Vienna on 9 December 1742. His daughter died a Chiusano in 1764.

== Works ==
In 1707, Carafa wrote a Parere (opinion) dedicated to Charles of Habsburg in which he identified four reforms the kingdom needed: a new legal code, an army recruited locally, the shoring up of the old nobility and academies to foster education and technical skill. He wrote two historical works, a history of Naples, Storia compendiata della città e Regno di Napoli, and an account of the causes and course of the conquest of the kingdom, Relazione della guerra in Italia nel 1733–1734. In the Relazione, he laments the attitudes of the city thus:

Naples, in order not to stain the title of 'most faithful city' which it had borne for over three thousand years, had made it a fundamental principle humbly to pray God to grant it a good prince, but, in practice, to tolerate any one that came along.

Carafa wrote many patriotic and moralizing poems, but also at least one poetic fable, Iliso o l'amante generoso. His religious interests and study of the Bible are apparent in his Meditazioni. In old age, he wrote the Opuscoli, reflexions on platonic love, friendship and honesty.

Carafa's most famous work is his Memorie (memories). It covers events from 1689 to 1707. It is known from a manuscript, but may have been published in 1713.

=== Editions ===
- Pizzo, Antonietta, ed. (2005). Memorie di Tiberio Carafa principe di Chiusano. Arte Tipografica.
- Conti, Vittorio, ed. (1973). "Il 'Parere' di Tiberio Carafa a Carlo d'Asburgo". Il Pensiero Politico. 6: 57–67.
- Maresca, Benedetto, ed. (1968). Relazione della guerra in Italia nel 1733-34 scritta da Tiberio Carafa. Forni.

== Bibliography ==
- Croce, Benedetto (1970) [1925]. History of the Kingdom of Naples. Translated by Frances Frenaye. University of Chicago Press.
- DelDonna, Anthony R. (2013). "Neapolitan Musical Culture in the Early Modern Period". In Tommaso Astarita (ed.). A Companion to Early Modern Naples. Brill. pp. 359–382.
- Luna-Fabritius, Adriana (2018). "The Secularization of Happiness in Early Eighteenth-century Italian Political Thought: Revisiting the Foundations of Civil Society". In László Kontler; Mark Somos (eds.). Trust and Happiness in the History of European Political Thought. Brill. pp. 169–195. doi:10.1163/9789004353671_010.
- Musi, Aurelio (2013). "Political History". In Tommaso Astarita (ed.). A Companion to Early Modern Naples. Brill. pp. 131–151.
- Pinton, Giorgio A. (2013). The Conspiracy of the Prince of Macchia and G. B. Vico. Rodopi. doi:10.1163/9789401209120.
- Russo, Carla (1976). "Carafa, Tiberio". Dizionario Biografico degli Italiani (in Italian). Vol. 19: Cappi–Cardona. Rome: Istituto dell'Enciclopedia Italiana. ISBN 978-88-12-00032-6.
