= Tiberio Carafa (bishop) =

Italian Catholic bishop (died 1588)

The Most Reverend Tiberio Carafa
- Bishop of Cassano all'Jonio
- Church: Catholic Church
- Diocese: Diocese of Cassano all'Jonio
- In office: 1579–1588
- Predecessor: Giovan Battista Serbelloni
- Successor: Owen Lewis (bishop)
- Previous post: Bishop of Potenza (1566–1579)

Orders
- Consecration: 26 May 1566 by Scipione Rebiba

Personal details
- Died: 1588 Cassano all'Jonio, Italy

Tiberio Carafa (died 1588) was a Roman Catholic prelate who served as Bishop of Cassano all'Jonio (1579–1588) and Bishop of Potenza (1566–1579).

== Biography ==
On 15 May 1566, Tiberio Carafa was appointed during the papacy of Pope Pius V as Bishop of Potenza. On 26 May 1566, he was consecrated bishop by Scipione Rebiba, Cardinal-Priest of Sant'Anastasia, with Giulio Antonio Santorio, Archbishop of Santa Severina, and Vincenzo Lauro, Bishop of Mondovi, serving as co-consecrators. On 6 Feb 1579, he was appointed during the papacy of Pope Gregory XIII as Bishop of Cassano all'Jonio. He served as Bishop of Cassano all'Jonio until his death in 1588.

== See also ==
- Catholic Church in Italy

== External links and additional sources ==
- Cheney, David M. "Archdiocese of Potenza-Muro Lucano-Marsico Nuovo". Catholic-Hierarchy.org. (for Chronology of Bishops) ^{[self-published]}
- Chow, Gabriel. "Metropolitan Archdiocese of Potenza–Muro Lucano–Marsico Nuovo (Italy)". GCatholic.org. (for Chronology of Bishops) ^{[self-published]}
- Cheney, David M. "Diocese of Cassano all'Jonio". Catholic-Hierarchy.org. (for Chronology of Bishops) ^{[self-published]}
- Chow, Gabriel. "Diocese of Cassano all'Jonio (Italy)". GCatholic.org. (for Chronology of Bishops) ^{[self-published]}

Catholic Church titles
| Preceded by Nino Nini | Bishop of Potenza; 1566–1579 | Succeeded by Sebastiano Barnaba |
| Preceded by Giovan Battista Serbelloni | Bishop of Cassano all'Jonio; 1579–1588 | Succeeded by Owen Lewis (bishop) |
