= Punjab Stadium =

Punjab Stadium may refer to:

- Punjab Cricket Association Stadium or I. S. Bindra Stadium/Mohali Stadium, a cricket ground in Mohali, Punjab, India
- Punjab Stadium, Pakistan, a football stadium in Lahore, Punjab, Pakistan
