= Raheela Zarmeen =

Pakistani footballer and manager

Raheela Zarmeen Ahmadzai
Personal information
- Full name: Princess Raheela Zarmeen Ahmadzai
- Date of birth: 1993 (age 32–33)
- Place of birth: Quetta, Balochistan, Pakistan

Team information
- Current team: Pakistan women's national football team (manager), Balochistan United FC (manager)

Managerial career
- Years: Team
- 2014–: Pakistan women
- 2014–: Balochistan United FC
- 2015: K-Electric F.C. (assistant)

Raheela Zarmeen Ahmadzai is a Pakistani footballer and the manager of the Pakistan women's national football team and Balochistan United FC.

== Family ==
She is the daughter of Pakistani women's football President Rubina Irfan and the sister of late Balochistan United and national team forward Shahlyla Ahmadzai.

== Coaching ==
Zarmeen is the first Pakistani to acquire the master's degree of FIFA, which qualifies her to work with the Asian Football Confederation (AFC) and FIFA.

=== K-Electric F.C. ===
In October 2015, Zarmeen became the first Pakistani woman to work as a coach of a men's team, K-Electric F.C.
