= Shahlyla Baloch =

Pakistani footballer (1996–2016)

Princess Shahlyla Baloch

Personal information
- Full name: Princess Shahlyla Ahmadzai Baloch
- Date of birth: 12 March 1996
- Place of birth: Quetta, Pakistan
- Date of death: 12 October 2016 (aged 20)
- Place of death: Karachi, Pakistan
- Position: Forward

Senior career*
| Years | Team | Apps | (Gls) |
| | Balochistan United | 6 | (16) |
| 2015 | → Sun Hotels and Resorts (loan) | 10 | (2) |

International career
| 2010–2016 | Pakistan | | |
- * Club domestic league appearances and goals

Princess Shahlyla Ahmadzai Baloch (12 March 1996 – 12 October 2016) was a Pakistani professional footballer who played as a forward for Balochistan United and the Pakistan national women's team. She was granddaughter of Prince Agha Abdul Karim Khan Ahmedzai, who was the younger brother of Ahmad of Kalat.

== Biography ==
Baloch was the first Pakistani woman to score a hat-trick in international club football when she did so during her stint in the Maldives. She represented Pakistan at the 2014 SAFF Women's Championship in Islamabad, which was the last international event that the Pakistan women's team competed in. She made the score sheet in Pakistan's 4–1 victory over Bhutan at that tournament.

She was the daughter of Pakistani women's football President and Senator Rubina Irfan and the sister of Balochistan United and National team manager Raheela Zarmeen. Shahlyla Baloch died in a road accident on 12 October 2016 in Karachi when the car she was in, driven by her cousin, struck a pole. She was ejected from the vehicle, said “Aduh” (ouch) and died.

In 2018, PFF decided to name the National Women U-16 Football Championship in her honour.

== Career statistics ==
=== International ===
Scores and results list Pakistan's goal tally first.

List of international goals scored by Shahlyla Baloch
| No. | Date | Venue | Opponent | Score | Result | Competition |
|---|---|---|---|---|---|---|
| 1 | 16 December 2010 | Cox's Bazar Stadium, Cox's Bazar, Bangladesh | Afghanistan | 2–0 | 3–0 | 2010 SAFF Women's Championship |
| 2 | 16 November 2014 | Jinnah Sports Stadium, Islamabad, Pakistan | Sri Lanka | 2–0 | 4–1 | 2014 SAFF Women's Championship |

== Honours ==
- National Women Football Championship: 2014
