= Mehwish Khan =

Pakistani footballer

Personal information
- Full name: Mehwish Khan
- Date of birth: 1990 (age 35–36)
- Place of birth: Peshawar, Pakistan

Team information
- Current team: WAPDA

Senior career*
Years	Team	Apps	(Gls)
- Diya W.F.C.
- WAPDA

International career
2010–	Pakistan		
- * Club domestic league appearances and goals

Mehwish Khan (born 1990) is an international footballer from Pakistan. She was the first woman footballer to score an international goal for Pakistan. She scored in the 2–1 win over Maldives at the SAFF Women's Football Championships held in Dhaka, Bangladesh in December 2010.

== Background ==
Khan comes from a Pathan family.

== Club career ==
Khan started playing as a striker for Diya Women Football Club.

== Career statistics ==
=== International ===
Scores and results list Pakistan's goal tally first.

List of international goals scored by Mehwish Khan
No.	Date	Venue	Opponent	Score	Result	Competition
1	14 December 2010	Cox's Bazar Stadium, Cox's Bazar, Bangladesh	Maldives	1–0	2–1	2010 SAFF Women's Championship
