= Rubina Irfan =

Pakistani politician (born 1965)

Senator Rubina Irfan
- In office March 2012 – March 2018
- President: Mamnoon Hussain
- Prime Minister: Nawaz Sharif

Personal details
- Born: 5 August 1965 (age 61) Quetta, Balochistan, Pakistan
- Party: PPPP (2026-present)
- Other political affiliations: BAP (2012-2025); PML(Q) (2012-2028)
- Children: Raheela and Shahlyla
- Education: University of Balochistan
- Occupation: Politician

Rubina Irfan (Urdu: روبینہ عرفان; born 5 August 1965) is a Pakistani politician who is a member of the Pakistan Muslim League (Q) and head of the party's women's wing. Since March 2012, she has served as a Senator of Pakistan. In 2002, she was elected to the Provincial Assembly of Balochistan. From 2007 to 2012, she served as a Law Minister in Balochistan. She is married to Agha Irfan Karim, a former member of the Balochistan Assembly. She is the mother of football players Raheela Zarmeen and Shahlyla Baloch, the latter of whom died in a car accident in 2016.

== Football ==
In 2004, Irfan founded Balochistan United W.F.C. around her three daughters and entered the team into the Pakistani women's football championship. She has also been the president of the Pakistan Football Federation's women's department since its inception in 2005. She supported the launch and development of the Pakistan women's national football team.
