= Diocese of Cassano all'Jonio =

Latin Catholic diocese in Italy

Coordinates: 39.7839°N 16.3189°E

Diocese of Cassano all’Ionio Dioecesis Cassanensis

Catholic
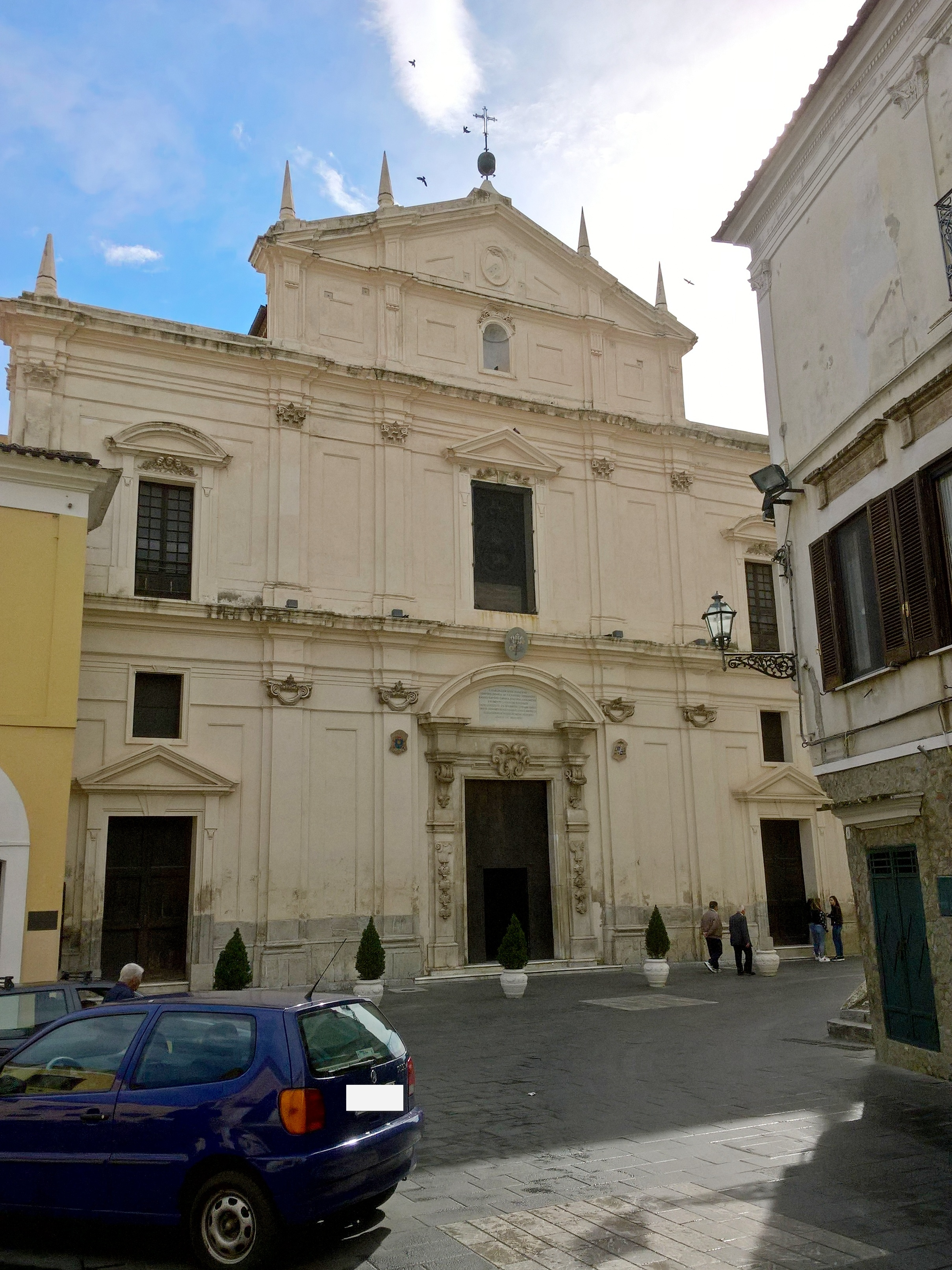

Location
- Country: Italy
- Ecclesiastical province: Cosenza-Bisignano

Statistics
- Area: 1,311 km^{2} (506 sq mi)
- Population: Total; Catholics: (as of 2023); 105,600 (est.) ▼; 100,600 (est.) ▼
- Parishes: 52

Information
- Denomination: Catholic Church
- Sui iuris church: Latin Church
- Rite: Roman Rite
- Established: 8th Century ?
- Cathedral: Nativity of the Blessed Virgin Mary
- Patron saint: Biagio Vescovo e Martire
- Secular priests: 57 (diocesan) ▼8 (Religious Orders) ▼7 Permanent Deacons

Current leadership
- Pope: Leo XIV
- Bishop: Francesco Savino
- Metropolitan Archbishop: Giovanni Checchinato

Map

Website
- www.diocesicassanoalloionio.it

The Diocese of Cassano all'Jonio (Latin: Dioecesis Cassanensis) is a Latin diocese of the Catholic Church in the civil province of Cosenza in the area of Calabria. It is about 14km, 3.5 hours' walking distance, to the west of Sibari, facing the Ionian Sea.

== History ==
A traditional story, intended to connect the Church of Cassano with the apostolic generation, points out that Paul the Apostle (Saul of Tarsus) stopped at Malta, Syracuse, and Reggio Calabria ("Acts of the Apostles," ch. 28), on his way to be araigned for trial in Rome. His travelling companion, Stephen of Nicaea (died 74), was appointed the first bishop of Reggio and commissioned to spread the Christian faith in Calabria. It was presumed that Paul left the same orders as he had given to Titus when he left him in Crete (Paul, "Epistle to Titus" 1:5), commissioning him to appoint presbyters, which is taken to mean bishops.

It is not known when Cassano became an episcopal See. Some place the establishment in the 5th century, though without supporting evidence.

In 859 Cassano and Cosenza were the headquarters of the Gastaldates of the Lombards of the Duchy of Benevento. In their turn the Lombards were attacked again and again, as were the Greeks in south Italy, by the Saracens (Arabs and Moors). The Greeks were able to drive the Saracens away, and reorganized Calabria as part of the Greek Empire and the Greek Church of Constantinople. Cassano was established around this time as a suffragan diocese of the Greek Metropolitan of Reggio Calabria.

In 1059 mention is made of a bishop of Cassano, whose name is not reported. He was engaged, along with the Provost of Gerace, in resisting the advance of the Normans, led by Robert Guiscard and his brothers. A battle took place against Count Roger at San Martino in Valle Salinarum, in which the Greeks, led by the bishop of Cassano, were defeated.

In 1096, a bishop of Cassano known as Saxo (Sassone) was a Vicar of Pope Urban II and Pope Paschal II in the region. In the 11th century, the diocese became a suffragan of Reggio Calabria. Pope Paschal II (1099–1118), however, granted the Church of Cassano complete immunity from the jurisdiction of the Metropolitanate of Reggio Calabria, and took it directly under the protection of the Holy See. On 20 October 1144, King Roger II of Sicily confirmed the privileges of the Church of Cassano.

=== Fra Marco d'Assisi ===
Fra Marco of Assissi had already been chosen and installed as bishop of Cassano before 14 January 1268, perhaps earlier than 12–14 December 1267 Before 28 April 1268, he discovered, however, that his approval and consecration were uncanonical, violating a new rule that no member of the Friars Minor (Franciscans) could accept a higher post without the permission of the Minister General or the Minister Provincial. Bishop Marco informed Pope Clement IV of his circumstances, but the pope was under pressure from the Franciscan Master General for a more widespread investigation, and for a suspension from all offices and benefices of those who had transgressed the law.

On 28 April 1268, the pope wrote to Cardinal Raoul Grosparmi, his legate, ordering a general investigation as to whether any permission was given to any Franciscan. But the pope also authorized him, if the election was otherwise in order, since it was the Cardinal Legate who had arranged for Fra Marco to be consecrated, to specially dispense the bishop in the name of the Holy See, in consideration of his praiseworthy life of virtue and good will. Fra Marco was to continue as the legitimate bishop of Cassano. Three days later, on 1 May, Clement wrote again to Cardinal Grosparmi, summoning him to Viterbo for consultations as soon as possible about Charles of Anjou, King of Sicily.

=== Abuses ===
In a petition of 1566, the citizens of Cassano complained to Pope Pius V (1566–1572) that, for more than fifty years, their bishops had not resided in the city or diocese of Cassano, and had not been carrying out their episcopal functions or administrative duties, but only taking their episcopal income. The casual attitude toward residence and duties spread to the cathedral Chapter and the clergy as well. It was noted that the popes had had to provide the bishops of Cassano since the local church was unable to offer adequate candidates.

=== Albanians and Greek rites ===
Beginning in the mid-15th century, under pressure from advancing hostile Turkish forces, numbers of Albanians and Slavs from western Greece, Epirus, and Albania migrated to Italy, all along the Adriatic coast, but especially to the Abruzzi and Calabria. For the most part they were Catholics, of the Greek (Byzantine) rite, and in communion with Rome. In Calabria, they did not assimilate, but kept to their own villages under the rule of their own chiefs, whose position was sanctioned by the kings of Naples. Unsympathetic Latin bishops, however, sought repeatedly to get the Greek rite Catholics to conform to Latin church expectations. This was particularly difficult in the matter of married Greek rite clergy, and the willingness of parishoners to cross the boundaries of rites to receive the sacraments.

In the papal bull "Etsi pastoralis" of 26 May 1742, Pope Benedict XIV attempted to remedy some of the abuses and lessen the tensions, forbidding Latin rite bishops from interfering with the use of the Greek rite. "Nor do we allow any Latin Ordinary to molest or to disturb these or any of them. And we inhibit all and any prelates or persons from blaspheming, reproving, or blaming the rites of the Greeks, which were approved in the Council of Florence or elsewhere." His measures failed to have the desired effect.

After nearly two centuries of debate, dissention and disobedience in Calabria between adherents of the Latin rite and those of the Greek rite, including bishops, priests, and laity, Pope Pius X intervened and granted Bishop Giovanni Barcia, titular bishop of Croia (Croiensis), the faculties to confer holy orders on Greek rite clerics of Calabria. Barcia, however, died on 2 December 1912. Pope Benedict XV finally felt compelled to intervene. He ordered the Sacred Congregation de Propaganda fide pro negotiis rituum orientalium to prepare proposals for the administration and reformation of the churches of the Greek rite, and on 19 November 1917, their recommendation decision was taken to create a new diocese.

On 13 February 1919, territory of four dioceses in Calabria were transferred to create the Eparchy of Lungro for the Italo-Albanian Catholic Church. Cassano lost the towns of Acqua Formosa, Civita, Firmo, Frascineto, Lungro, Piataci, Porcile, and S. Basile.

=== Seminary ===
In accordance with the decrees of the Council of Trent, Bishop Serbelloni (1561–1579) appointed a committee to plan the creation of a seminary for the diocese of Cassano. The seminary was formally created by a decree of Bishop Carafa on 6 March 1588, and in 1593 Bishop Audoeno (Owen Lewis) fixed the number of scholars at twelve, and for the next century the number never exceeded twenty. The seminary was perpetually short of funds.

=== Cathedral ===
The old cathedral was consecrated by Bishop Tomacelli on 3 May 1491. The bell tower was completed by Bishop Gaetano in 1608.

The new cathedral in Cassano all'Ionio was consecrated on 22 March 1722 by Bishop Francesco Maria Loyerio of Umbriatico. The decoration of the Choir was completed in 1750. The stucco façade of the cathedral was completed by Bishop Coppola in 1795, and the marble pulpit installed. Many of the treasures of the cathedral were stolen or damaged during the revolutionary period 1798–1806.

The Cathedral was governed by a Chapter, composed (in 1752) of four dignities and eighteen Canons. The dignities were: the Archdeacon, the Dean, the Cantor and the Treasurer.

In 1824, due to a fire in the episcopal palace, the archives of the diocese and the cathedral Chapter were destroyed.

=== Statistics ===
In 1920, after the creation of the Eparchy of Lungro, the diocese of Cassano claimed c. 130,300 Catholics, in 51 parishes and 37 vicariates, served by 253 secular priests and 10 priests of religious Orders. There were 200 churches or chapels. There was one convent of Capuchins, one convent of Poor Clares, and one convent of the Sisters of Reparation.

=== Reorganization ===
On 8 September 1976, the Sacred Congregation of Bishops, with the approval of Pope Paul VI, added territory to the diocese of Cassano by removing eight towns from the jurisdiction of the diocese of Anglona-Tursi.

On 4 April 1979, Pope John Paul II issued the bull "Quo aptius", which, inter multa alia removed ten towns from the jurisdiction of the bishop of Cassano and assigned them to the diocese of San Marco-Argentano.

On 30 January 2001, Pope John Paul II, in the bull "Maiori Christifidelium," ordered the reorganization of the ecclesiastical provinces in Calabria. The diocese of Cassano had previously been a suffragan of Reggio Calabriae, but in the new circumscription became a suffragan of Cosenza-Bisignano.

== See also ==
- Italo-Albanese Eparchy of Lungro

== Bishops ==
=== Diocese of Cassano all’Jonio ===
==== to 1300 ====
○ [Caprarius (465)]

...

- Thomas (attested April 1171 – April 1174)
- Ignotus (1179–1181)

...

- Goffredus (attested 1195)
- Terricius (attested 1220, 1221, 1223)
- Biagio (c. 1233 or 1235)
- Giovanni de' Fortibracci (1252 – after 1254)
- Giordano Russo (c. 1266–1267)
- Marco d'Assisi, O.Min. (1268 – 1282/1285)
- Pasquale (c. 1282–1298)
- Richardus (1298–1301)

==== 1300–1500 ====
- Guglielmo de Cuna, O.Min. (1301 – 1312?)

○ [ Alberto Bizozio (1312) ]

- Joannes
- Giovanni da Mafino (18 March 1329 – 1334)
- Landulfus Vulcani (24 October 1334 – 1334/1335)
- Gunius
- Durandus
- Rogerius Quadrimani (January 1348 – 1348)
- Giovanni da Papasidero (17 March 1348 – 1373)
- Marino del Judice (18 May 1373 – 1379)
- Andreas Cumanus (26 January 1379 – ) (Avignon Obedience)
- Carlo Corsini (2 December 1383 – ) (Avignon Obedience)
- Robertus (1378– ) (Roman Obedience)
- Nicolaus (c. 1383) (Roman Obedience)
- Petrus (1 October 1392 – 1399)
- Phoebus de Sanseverino (1 December 1399 – 1404)
- Marino Scannaforcie (11 November 1404 – 1418?)
- Antonello dei Gesualdi, O.Celest. (23 November 1418 – 1428?)
- Belforte Spinelli (1432 – 12 December 1440)
- Giovanni Francesco Brusato (8 December 1463 – 22 March 1476)
- Bartolomeo del Poggio (22 March 1476 – 1485 Died)
- Nicola Tomacelli (1485–1490 Died)
- Marino Tomacelli (1491–1519 Died)

==== 1500–1700 ====
- Cardinal Domenico Giacobazzi (1519–1523 Resigned) (Administrator)
- Cristoforo Giacobazzi (23 March 1523 – 7 October 1540 Died)
- Durante Duranti (1541–1551)
- Bernardo Antonio Michelozzi de' Medici (1551–1552 Died)
- Giovanni Angelo de' Medici (1 March 1553 – 25 June 1556)
- Mark Sittich von Hohenems Altemps (29 May 1560 – 17 December 1561)
- Giovan Battista Serbelloni (17 December 1561 – 1579 Resigned)
- Tiberio Carafa (1579–1588 Died)
- Owen Lewis (1588–1595)
- Giulio Caracciolo (1597–1599 Died)
- Bonifazio Caetani (1599–1613 Appointed Archbishop of Taranto)
- Diego de Arce (Deodata de Arze), O.F.M. Obs. (1614–1617 Died)
- Paolo Palombo, C.R. (1617–1648 Died)
- Gregorio Carafa, C.R. (1648–1664)
- Alfonso de Balmaseda, O.S.A. (16 June 1670 – 25 September 1673)
- Giovanni Battista del Tinto, O. Carm. (1676–1685 Died)
- Francisco de Sequeiros y Sotomayor, O.S.A. (1 April 1686 – 1691 Died)
- Vincenzo de Magistris (del Maestro), O.P. (1692–1705 Died)

==== 1700–1900 ====
- Nicolò Rocco (1707–1726 Died)
- Gennaro Fortunato (1729–1751 Died)
- Giovanni Battista Miceli (1752–1763 Died)
- Giovanni Battista Coppola (1763–1797 Died)

Sede vacante (1797–1818)

- [Francesco Antonio Grillo, O.F.M. Conv. (7 November 1804 Died)]
- Adeodato Gomez Cardosa (26 June 1818 – 19 December 1825)
- Michele Bombini (1829–1871 Died)
- Alessandro Maria Basile, C.SS.R. (1871–1883 Died)
- Raffaele Danise, M.I. (1883 – 24 March 1884)
- Antonio Pistocchi (1884–1888 Died)
- Evangelista (Michael Antonio) di Milia, O.F.M. Cap. (11 February 1889 – 13 November 1898)
- Antonio Maria Bonito (1899–1905)

==== since 1900 ====
- Pietro La Fontaine (1906–1910)
- Giuseppe Bartolomeo Rovetta (1911–1920 Resigned)
- Bruno Occhiuto (1921–1937)
- Raffaele Barbieri (1937–1968)
- Domenico Vacchiano (1970–1978)
- Girolamo Grillo (1979–1983)
- Giovanni Francesco Pala (1984–1987 Died)
- Andrea Mugione (1988–1998)
- Domenico Graziani (1999–2006 Appointed Archbishop of Crotone-Santa Severina)
- Vincenzo Bertolone, S.d.P. (2007–2011 Appointed Archbishop of Catanzaro-Squillace)
- Nunzio Galantino (9 December 2011 – 28 February 2015)
- Francesco Savino (2015– )

===== Auxiliary Bishops =====
- Pedro Torres (bishop) (1540– )

== Books ==
=== Reference works ===
- Eubel, Conradus, ed. (1913). Hierarchia catholica (in Latin). Vol. 1 (Tomus 1) (second ed.). Münster: Libreria Regensbergiana. pp. 169–170.. Archived.
- Eubel, Conradus, ed. (1914). Hierarchia catholica (in Latin). Vol. 2 (Tomus 2) (second ed.). Münster: Libreria Regensbergiana. p. 120.. Archived.
- Eubel, Conradus, ed. (1923). Hierarchia catholica (in Latin). Vol. 3 (Tomus 3) (second ed.). Münster: Libreria Regensbergiana. p. 156.. Archived.
- Gams, Pius Bonifatius (1873). Series episcoporum Ecclesiae catholicae: quotquot innotuerunt a beato Petro apostolo. Ratisbon: Typis et Sumptibus Georgii Josephi Manz. pp. 871-872. (Use with caution; obsolete)
- Gauchat, Patritius (Patrice) (1935). Hierarchia catholica (in Latin). Vol. IV (1592-1667). Münster: Libraria Regensbergiana.
- Ritzler, Remigius; Sefrin, Pirminus (1952). Hierarchia catholica medii et recentis aevi (in Latin). Vol. V (1667-1730). Patavii: Messagero di S. Antonio.
- Ritzler, Remigius; Sefrin, Pirminus (1958). Hierarchia catholica medii et recentis aevi (in Latin). Vol. 6 (1730-1799). Patavii: Messagero di S. Antonio.
- Ritzler, Remigius; Sefrin, Pirminus (1968). Hierarchia Catholica medii et recentioris aevi (in Latin). Vol. 7 (1800–1846). Monasterii: Libr. Regensburgiana.
- Ritzler, Remigius; Sefrin, Pirminus (1978). Hierarchia catholica Medii et recentioris aevi (in Latin). Vol. 8 (1846–1903). Il Messaggero di S. Antonio.
- Pięta, Zenon (2002). Hierarchia catholica medii et recentioris aevi (in Latin). Vol. 9 (1903–1922). Padua: Messagero di San Antonio. ISBN 978-88-250-1000-8.

=== Studies ===
- Alario, Leonardo R. (2019). Cronotassi dei vescovi di Cassano. Diocesi Calabro Lucana dei due mari. XVII Secolo. Cosenza: Luigi Pellegrini Editore 2019.
- Avino, Vincenzio d' (1848). Cenni storici sulle chiese arcivescovili, vescovili, e prelatizie (nullius) del regno delle due Sicilie (in Italian). Naples: dalle stampe di Ranucci. pp. 149–163.
- Bloise, G. (1899)." I vescovi di Cassano," (in Italian), in: Del primo ingresso di sua eccellenza mons. Antonio Maria Bonito vescovo di Cassano al Jonio. Castrovillari: Patitucci 1899, p. xxxviii.
- Cappelletti, Giuseppe (1870). Le chiese d'Italia: dalla loro origine sino ai nostri giorni (in Italian). Vol. vigesimo primo (21). Venezia: G. Antonelli. pp. 238–244.
- Cotroneo, R. (1901). "La Diocesi di Cassano nel 1500," (in Italian), in: Rivista storica calabrese Vol. 9 (1901), pp. 470-483.
- Duchesne, Louis (1902), "Les évèchés de Calabre," Mélanges Paul Fabre: études d'histoire du moyen âge (in French). Paris: A. Picard et fils. 1902. pp. 1–16.
- Fortescue, Adrien (1923). The Uniate Eastern Churches: The Byzantine Rite in Italy, Sicily, Syria and Egypt. ed. G.D. Smith. London: Burns, Oates & Washbourne 1923. pp. 158-164.
- Hervé-Commereuc, Catherine (1995). "La Calabre dans l'État normand d'Italie du Sud (XIe-XIIe siècles)," (in French), in: Annales de Normandie 45 (1995). pp. 3-25.
- Jacques, Edwin E. (1995). The Albanians: An Ethnic History from Prehistoric Times to the Present. Volume 1. Jefferson North Carolina: McFarland 1995 reprint: 2009). pp. 194-196.
- Kamp, Norbert (1975). Kirche und Monarchie im staufischen Königreich Sizilien: I. Prosopographische Grundlegung, Bistumer und Bistümer und Bischöfe des Konigreichs 1194–1266: 2. Apulien und Calabrien München: Wilhelm Fink 1975.
- Kehr, Paulus Fridolin (1975). (ed. D. Girgensohn). Italia pontificia. Regesta pontificum Romanorum. (in Latin) Vol. X: Calabria–Insulae. Berlin: Weidmann.
- Napolitano, S. (2001). "Territorio e società civile nelle relationes ad limina dei vescovi di Cassano allo Jonio (1588-1797)," (in Italian), in: Rivista storica calabrese, vol. 22 (2001), pp. 119-144.
- Russo, F. (1968). Storia della Diocesi di Cassano al Jonio. Vol. 3, Cronotassi dei vescovi. Napoli: Tipografia Laurenziana, 1968.
- Taccone-Gallucci, Domenico (1902). Regesti dei Romani pontefici della Calabria (in Italian). Rome: Tip. Vaticana. pp. 404-406.
- Ughelli, Ferdinando; Coleti, Niccolo (1721). Italia Sacra Sive De Episcopis Italiae, Et Insularum adiacentium (in Latin). Vol. Tomus nonus (9). Venice: Antonio Coleti. pp. 342–355.
