= Balochistan United WFC =

Pakistani football club

Balochistan United
- Full name: Balochistan United Women Football Club
- Short name: BUFC
- Founded: 2004; 22 years ago
- Dissolved: 2018; 8 years ago
- Owner: Rubina Irfan
- Chairman: Raheela Zarmeen
- League: National Women Football Championship
- Website: http://balochistanunitedwfc.wixsite.com/buwfc
Home colours	Away colours	Third colours

Balochistan United Women Football Club was a Pakistani women's football club based in Quetta. The club competed in the National Women Football Championship.

== History ==
In 2004 Rubina Irfan founded Balochistan United around her three daughters and entered the team into the Pakistani women's football championship. The Club accepts players from all religious and ethnic backgrounds, including Baloch, Ismailis, Hazaras and Christians: "For women to progress in Pakistan, we do not need to draw even more lines between them," said Irfan.

The team won the 2014 National Women's Football Championship after defeating WAPDA in the final. The team last played in the 2018 National Women's Football Championship.

== Players ==
=== Retired numbers ===
7 (Pakistan) Shahlyla Baloch, Forward (2005–2016)

== Honours ==
- National Women Football Championship
  - Winners (1): 2014
