= Roman Catholic Diocese of Hierapetra and Sitia =

Former Roman Catholic diocese in Crete

The Diocese of Hierapetra and Sitia (also Hierapytna or Gerapitna) was a Roman Catholic diocese located in the city of Hierapetra in the southeast of the Greek island of Crete when it was under Venetian rule. It was suppressed sometime in the 1600s.

== History ==
- 1200s: Established as Diocese of Hierapetra
- 1650?: Suppressed
- 1933: Restored as Titular Episcopal See of Hierapetra

== Ordinaries ==
=== Diocese of Hierapetra ===
Latin Name: Hierapetrensis

- Philippe Bartolomei (14 Apr 1480 – 1501 Died)
- Ippolito Arrivabene (20 Dec 1542 – 1564 Resigned)
- Nicolaus Bertholdi (14 Jul 1564 – 20 Jun 1571 Died)

=== Diocese of Hierapetra and Sitia ===
16 July 1571: United with the Diocese of Sitia
Latin Name: Hierapetrensis et Sythiensis

- Gaspare Viviani (16 Jul 1571 – 3 Aug 1579 Appointed, Bishop of Anagni)
- Alexander de Turre, C.R.L. (31 Jan 1594 – 1624 Died)
- Pierre Pisani, O.F.M. (7 Oct 1624 – 1634 Resigned)
- Georges Minotti (21 Aug 1634 Appointed – )
