= Pakistan women's national football team results =

This is a list of the Pakistan women's national football team results from 2010 to the present.

== Overview ==
The team made its debut at the 2010 South Asian Games, before participating in the first three editions of the biennial SAFF Women's Championship. The team saw no action from 2014 to 2022 due to several FIFA suspensions served by the Pakistan Football Federation as a result of infighting and political interference in the federation. After FIFA lifted its most recent suspension on 30 June 2022, Pakistan played its first match in almost eight years on 7 September 2022, when it faced off against India in its opening match of the 2022 SAFF Women's Championship.

In September 2023, the Pakistan women's national football team participated in international competitions. They also participated in a six-nation tournament in Saudi Arabia, where they secured a victory over Laos in a match that ended in a penalty shootout. In April 2023 during the AFC Olympic Qualifiers by winning their first-ever competitive fixture against Tajikistan, finishing third in Group E of round one of the qualifiers for the Paris Olympics 2024.

In July 2023, the Pakistan women’s football team participated in a friendly match against Singapore.

== Results ==
Legend

Win Draw Lose Fixture

=== 2010 ===
31 January 2010 South Asian Games group stage	India	6–0	Pakistan	Dhaka, Bangladesh
	Oinam Bembem Devi 10', 11', 17'; Sasmita Malik 7', 28'; Naobi Chanu 90'	Report		Stadium: Bangabandhu National Stadium

2 February 2010 South Asian Games group stage	Bangladesh	1–0	Pakistan	Dhaka, Bangladesh
	Sabina Khatun 15'	Report		Stadium: Bangabandhu National Stadium

4 February 2010 South Asian Games group stage	Pakistan	w/o	Sri Lanka	Dhaka, Bangladesh
		Report		Stadium: Bangabandhu National Stadium
Note: Awarded to Pakistan, as Sri Lanka decided to catch a flight home

6 February 2010 South Asian Games group stage	Pakistan	0–7	Nepal	Dhaka, Bangladesh
		Report	Anu Lama; Jamuna Gurung; Parmila Rai	Stadium: Bangabandhu National Stadium

14 December 2010 2010 SAFF Women's Championship group stage	Pakistan	2–1	Maldives	Cox's Bazar, Bangladesh
16:30 BST (UTC+06:00)	Mehwish 44'; Malika-e-Noor 89'	Report		Stadium: Cox's Bazar Stadium; Attendance: 1,602; Referee: Depok Roy (Nepal)

16 December 2010 2010 SAFF Women's Championship group stage	Pakistan	3–0	Afghanistan	Cox's Bazar, Bangladesh
12:30 BST (UTC+06:00)	Malika-e-Noor 21'; Shahlyla 40'; Mejzgaan Orakzai 75'	Report		Stadium: Cox's Bazar Stadium; Attendance: 841; Referee: Kazal Khan (Bangladesh)

18 December 2010 2010 SAFF Women's Championship group stage	Nepal	12–0	Pakistan	Cox's Bazar, Bangladesh
12:30 BST (UTC+06:00)	Anu Lama 15', 56', 69'; Mira Maharjan 21'; Laxmi Poudel 45', 77'; Jamuna Gurung 50', 87', 88'; Pramila Rai 52'; Sajana Rana 53'; Rajana Darji 82'	Report		Stadium: Cox's Bazar Stadium; Attendance: 987; Referee: M Rahman (Bangladesh)

20 December 2010 2010 SAFF Women's Championship semifinal	India	8–0	Pakistan	Cox's Bazar, Bangladesh
14:30 BST (UTC+06:00)	Bala Devi 18', 31', 32'; Gayatri Mallick 26', 39'; Sasmita Malik 33'; Amoolya Kamal 45'; Manpreet Kaur 8'	Report		Stadium: Cox's Bazar Stadium; Attendance: 4,802; Referee: Lutfaar Chowdhury (Maldives)

=== 2012 ===
8 September 2012 2012 SAFF Women's Championship group stage	Nepal	8–0	Pakistan	Colombo, Sri Lanka
8:30 SST (UTC+05:30)	Jamuna Gurung 9', 32', 34', 44'; Pramila Rai 16'; Sajana Rana 42'; Anu Lama 51'; Dipa Adhikari 72'	Report		Stadium: CR & FC Grounds; Attendance: 870; Referee: Afsanul Haque (Maldives)

10 September 2012 2012 SAFF Women's Championship group stage	Pakistan	0–4	Afghanistan	Colombo, Sri Lanka
15:30 SST (UTC+05:30)		Report	Shabnam Rohin 8', 23'; Hailai Arghandiwal 51'; Marjan Haydaree 89'	Stadium: CR & FC Grounds; Attendance: 4,870; Referee: Deponkor Ghosh (India)

12 September 2012 2012 SAFF Women's Championship group stage	Maldives	0–3	Pakistan	Colombo, Sri Lanka
15:30 SST (UTC+05:30)			Hajra Khan 12', 85'; Malika-e-Noor 69'	Stadium: CR & FC Grounds; Attendance: 4,612; Referee: Farukh Islam (Bangladesh)

=== 2014 ===
23 October 2014 International friendly	Bahrain	5–0	Pakistan	Riffa, Bahrain
	Reem Al Hashmi; Reem Al Hashmi; Reem Al Hashmi; Dwa Al Khalifa; Al Anood Al Khalifa	Report		Stadium: Bahrain National Stadium; Attendance: 100

26 October 2014 International friendly	Bahrain	5–1	Pakistan	Riffa, Bahrain
	Reem Al Hashmi; Deena Abdulrahman; Deena Abdulrahman; Yasmeen Fayez; Yasmeen Fayez	Report	Hajra Khan 4'	Stadium: Bahrain National Stadium; Attendance: 250

29 October 2014 International friendly	Bahrain	10–1	Pakistan	Riffa, Bahrain
	Reem Al Hashmi; Reem Al Hashmi; Reem Al Hashmi; Deena Abdulrahman; Shaikha Al Khalifa; Yasmeen Fayez; Yasmeen Fayez; Al Anood Al Khalifa; Manar Ebrahim; Rose Fayez	Report	Hajra Khan	Stadium: Bahrain National Stadium; Attendance: 250

11 November 2014 2014 SAFF Women's Championship group stage	Pakistan	1–2	Sri Lanka	Islamabad, Pakistan
11:00 PST (UTC+05:00)	Hajra 90+1'	Report	Ishara 38'; Erandi 86'	Stadium: Jinnah Sports Stadium; Attendance: 1,000; Referee: Kalpana Sharma (Nepal)

14 November 2014 2014 SAFF Women's Championship group stage	Pakistan	0–2	Nepal	Islamabad, Pakistan
		Report	Anu Lama 14'; Sajana Rana 24'	Stadium: Jinnah Sports Stadium; Attendance: 1,700

16 November 2014 2014 SAFF Women's Championship group stage	Pakistan	4–1	Bhutan	Islamabad, Pakistan
	Sahar Zaman 55'; Shahlyla Baloch 68'; Shenaz Roshan 74'; Malika-e-Noor 79' (pen.)	Report	Tshering Yangdon 69'	Stadium: Jinnah Sports Stadium; Attendance: 4,000

=== 2022 ===
7 September 2022 2022 SAFF Women's Championship group stage	India	3–0	Pakistan	Kathmandu, Nepal
13:00 NPT (UTC+05:45)	Maria 21' (o.g.); Grace 23'; Soumya 90+4'	Report		Stadium: Dashrath Stadium; Attendance: 250; Referee: Yapa Y.A. Pabasara Minisarani (Sri Lanka)

10 September 2022 2022 SAFF Women's Championship group stage	Pakistan	0–6	Bangladesh	Kathmandu, Nepal
13:00 NPT (UTC+05:45)		Report	Monika 3'; Shopna 28'; Sabina 31', 35', 59'; Ritu Chakma 77'	Stadium: Dashrath Stadium; Attendance: 205; Referee: Choki Om (Bhutan)

13 September 2022 2022 SAFF Women's Championship group stage	Maldives	0–7	Pakistan	Kathmandu, Nepal
13:00 NPT (UTC+05:45)		Report	Rameen 39'; Khadija 49' (pen.); Nadia 54', 78', 84', 90'; Anmol 90+5'	Stadium: Dashrath Stadium; Attendance: 97; Referee: Yapa Y.A. Pabasara Minisarani (Sri Lanka)

=== 2023 ===
11 January 2023 Four-Nation Cup 2023 Saudi Arabia	Pakistan	1–0	Comoros	Khobar, Saudi Arabia
16:30 UTC+3	Anmol 89'	Report		Stadium: Prince Saud bin Jalawi Stadium; Referee: Anoud Alasmari (Saudi Arabia)

15 January 2023 Four-Nation Cup 2023 Saudi Arabia	Mauritius	2–1	Pakistan	Khobar, Saudi Arabia
16:30 UTC+3	Jheemla 4'; Gopal 64'	Report	M. Khan 9'	Stadium: Prince Saud bin Jalawi Stadium; Referee: Edita Mirabidova (Uzbekistan)

19 January 2023 Four-Nation Cup 2023 Saudi Arabia	Saudi Arabia	1–1	Pakistan	Khobar, Saudi Arabia
20:30 UTC+3	Mobarak 28'	Report	M. Khan 64'	Stadium: Prince Saud bin Jalawi Stadium

5 April 2023 2024 AFC Olympic Qualifiers–Round 1	Philippines	4–0	Pakistan	Hisor, Tajikistan
16:00 UTC+5	Long 21'; Bolden 25'; Madarang 29'; McDaniel 85'	Report		Stadium: Hisor Central Stadium; Attendance: 100; Referee: Dong Fangyu (China)

8 April 2023 2024 AFC Olympic Qualifiers–Round 1	Pakistan	0–2	Hong Kong	Hisor, Tajikistan
16:00 UTC+5		Report	C. Po Yan 73'; S. Khan 90' (o.g.)	Stadium: Hisor Central Stadium; Referee: Ranjita Devi Tekcham (India)

11 April 2023 2024 AFC Olympic Qualifiers–Round 1	Tajikistan	0–1	Pakistan	Hisor, Tajikistan
19:00 UTC+5		Report	Zahmena Malik 26'	Stadium: Hisor Central Stadium; Referee: Ranjita Devi Tekcham (India)

18 July 2023 Friendly	Singapore	1–0	Pakistan	Jalan Besar, Singapore
19:00 UTC+8	Farah Nurzahirah 81'			Stadium: Jalan Besar Stadium; Referee: Bui Thi Thu Trang (Vietnam)

21 September 2023 2023 Women's Friendly Tournament	Malaysia	0–0	Pakistan	Taif, Saudi Arabia
20:30 UTC+3				Stadium: King Fahd Sports City

24 September 2023 2023 Women's Friendly Tournament	Pakistan	0–1	Saudi Arabia	Taif, Saudi Arabia
20:30 UTC+3		Report	B. Al-Hwsawi 90+5'	Stadium: King Fahd Sports City

28 September 2023 2023 Women's Friendly Tournament	Pakistan	1–1 (4–2 p)	Laos	Taif, Saudi Arabia
20:30 UTC+3	Zulfia 58'	Report	Xayapaserd 63'	Stadium: King Fahd Sports City
	Penalties
	Z. Shah (penalty missed); Hirani (penalty scored); Malik (penalty scored); Malika-e-Noor (penalty scored); M. Khan (penalty scored)		(penalty missed) Phatthalavady; (penalty scored) Kemmy; (penalty scored) Phanykone; (penalty missed) Chinda; (penalty missed) Saysamone

=== 2024 ===
17 October 2024 2024 SAFF W GS	Pakistan	2–5	India	Kathmandu, Nepal
	Suha Hirani 45+2' (pen.); Kayla Marie Siddiqi 47'	Report	Dangmei 5', 42'; Manisha 17'; Bala Devi 35'; Chouhan 78'	Stadium: Dashrath Stadium; Attendance: 452; Referee: Anjana Rai (Nepal)

20 October 2024 2024 SAFF W GS	Bangladesh	1–1	Pakistan	Kathmandu, Nepal
	Shamsunnahar Jr. 90+1'	Report	Zahmena Malik 32'	Stadium: Dashrath Stadium; Attendance: 307; Referee: Choki Om (Bhutan)

7 December 2024 Friendly	Saudi Arabia	1–1	Pakistan	Doha, Qatar
19:00 UTC+3	Al-Ghamid 37'	Report	Hirani 87'	Stadium: Aspire Academy Stadium; Referee: Khalid Al-Shaqsi (Oman)

=== 2025 ===
29 June 2026 AFC Women's Asian Cup qualification	Chinese Taipei	8–0	Pakistan	Tangerang Regency, Indonesia
15:30 UTC+7	Pu Hsin-Hui 14', 86'; Chen Jin-Wen 16'; Su-Yu-Hsuan 40'; Hsu Yi-Yun 66'; Liu Yu-Chiao 88'; He Jia-Shiuan 90+1', 90+2'	Report		Stadium: Indomilk Arena; Referee: Cha Min-ji (South Korea)

2 July 2026 AFC Women's Asian Cup qualification	Pakistan	2–0	Indonesia	Tangerang Regency, Indonesia
20:00 UTC+7	N. Khan 8'; Hirani 19' (pen.)	Report		Stadium: Indomilk Arena

5 July 2026 AFC Women's Asian Cup qualification	Kyrgyzstan	1–2	Pakistan	Tangerang Regency, Indonesia
15:30 UTC+7	Alina Gaparova 69'	Report	Mahmood 4', 26' (pen.)	Stadium: Indomilk Arena

=== 2026 ===
9 April 2026 FIFA Series	Pakistan	8–0	Turks & Caicos	Abidjan, Ivory Coast
16:00	Malik 10'; Mushtaq 12', 77'; Banaras 31', 79'; Mahmood 38'; N. Khan 57'; I. Khan 81'	Report (FIFA)		Stadium: Alassane Ouattara Stadium; Referee: Natacha Konan (Ivory Coast)

12 April 2026 FIFA Series	Mauritania	1–0	Pakistan	Abidjan, Ivory Coast
16:00	Gengui 20'	Report (FIFA)		Stadium: Alassane Ouattara Stadium; Referee: Odilone Ehui (Ivory Coast)

16 April 2026 FIFA Series	Ivory Coast	2–0	Pakistan	Abidjan, Ivory Coast
19:30	Diallo 40'; Ouédraogo 69'	Report (FIFA)		Stadium: Alassane Ouattara Stadium; Referee: Jacqueline Nikiéma (Burkina Faso)

== Head to head record ==
Opponent	P	W	D	L	GF	GA	W%	D%	L%	Confederation	First meeting
(Afghanistan) Afghanistan	2	1	0	1	3	4	50	0	50	AFC	16 December 2010
(Bangladesh) Bangladesh	3	0	1	2	1	8	0	33.3	66.7	AFC	2 February 2010
(Bahrain) Bahrain	3	0	0	3	2	20	0	0	100	AFC	23 October 2014
(Bhutan) Bhutan	1	1	0	0	4	1	100	0	0	AFC	16 November 2014
(Chinese Taipei) Chinese Taipei	1	0	0	1	0	8	0	0	100	AFC	29 June 2025
(Comoros) Comoros	1	1	0	0	1	0	100	0	0	CAF	11 January 2023
(Hong Kong) Hong Kong	1	0	0	1	0	2	0	0	100	AFC	8 April 2023
(India) India	4	0	0	4	2	22	0	0	100	AFC	31 January 2010
(Indonesia) Indonesia	1	1	0	0	2	0	100	0	0	AFC	2 July 2025
(Ivory Coast) Ivory Coast	1	0	0	1	0	2	0	0	100	CAF	16 April 2026
(Kyrgyzstan) Kyrgyzstan	1	1	0	0	2	1	100	0	0	AFC	5 July 2025
(Laos) Laos	1	0	1	0	1	1	0	100	0	AFC	28 September 2023
(Malaysia) Malaysia	1	0	1	0	0	0	0	100	0	AFC	21 September 2023
(Maldives) Maldives	3	3	0	0	12	1	100	0	0	AFC	14 December 2010
(Mauritania) Mauritania	1	0	0	1	0	1	0	0	100	CAF	12 April 2026
(Mauritius) Mauritius	1	0	0	1	1	2	0	0	100	CAF	15 January 2023
(Nepal) Nepal	4	0	0	4	0	29	0	0	100	AFC	18 December 2010
(Philippines) Philippines	1	0	0	1	0	4	0	0	100	AFC	5 April 2023
(Saudi Arabia) Saudi Arabia	3	0	2	1	2	3	0	66.67	33.33	AFC	19 January 2023
(Singapore) Singapore	1	0	0	1	0	1	0	0	100	AFC	18 July 2023
(Sri Lanka) Sri Lanka	2	1	0	1	4	2	50	0	50	AFC	11 November 2014
(Tajikistan) Tajikistan	1	1	0	0	1	0	100	0	0	AFC	11 April 2023
(Turks and Caicos Islands) Turks and Caicos	1	1	0	0	8	0	100	0	0	CONCACAF	9 April 2026
Totals	39	11	5	23	46	112					

Last updated: Ivory Coast vs Pakistan, 16 April 2026.

== See also ==
- Pakistan men's national team results
