= Mauritania women's national football team results =

Mauritania women's national football team

The Mauritania women's national football team is the representative women's association football team of Mauritania. Its governing body is the Football Federation of the Islamic Republic of Mauritania (FFM) and it competes as a member of the Confederation of African Football (CAF).

== Results ==
=== 2019 ===
30 July 2019 International Friendly	Mauritania	1–3	Djibouti	Nouakchott, Mauritania
17:00 UTC+0	Dioup ?'	Report	Abdi Warsama ?' (pen.); Fouad Abdallah 34'; Abdillahi Said ?'	Stadium: Stade Cheikha Ould Boïdiya

2 August 2019 COTIF Women's Football Tournament GS	Spain U19	11–0	Mauritania	Alcúdia, Spain
20:00 UTC+1	Carrillo 1'; Marín 8'; Peña 11'; López 29'; Martínez 35' (pen.); Bernabé 37' (pen.); Salvador 47'; Pala 50'; Alonso 61'; Villanueva 65'; Sánchez 72' (pen.)	Report		Stadium: Estadi Els Arcs; Attendance: 2,500; Referee: (Spain) Alejandro Muñiz Ruiz

4 August 2019 COTIF Women's Football Tournament GS	India	7–0	Mauritania	Alcúdia, Spain
18:45 UTC+1	Kalyan 3'; Grace 7', 32'; N.Devi 27'; L. Devi 50' (pen.), 63' (pen.); D. Devi 65'	Report		Stadium: Estadi Els Arcs; Attendance: 1,500; Referee: (Spain) Luis Mario Milla Alvendiz

5 August 2019 COTIF Women's Football Tournament GS	Villarreal U20 (Spain)	6–1	Mauritania	Alcúdia, Spain
18:45 UTC+1	Collado 7', 48'; Díaz 16'; Segura 46'; Colonques 50', 70' (pen.)	Report	Diabira 24'	Stadium: Estadi Els Arcs; Attendance: 1,500; Referee: (Spain) Gorka Sagues Oscoz

7 August 2019 COTIF Women's Football Tournament GS	Bolivia U19	5–0	Mauritania	Alcúdia, Spain
20:00 UTC+1	Doerksen 1', 31', 36'; Veizaga 9', 46'	Report		Stadium: Estadi Els Arcs; Attendance: 1,500; Referee: (Spain) José Antonio López Toca

=== 2020 ===
14 February 2020 UNAF Women's Tournament	Tanzania	7–0	Mauritania	El Kram, Tunisia
11:00 UTC+1	Bilali 8'; Clement 13'; Saloum 23'; Kasonga 28'; Shurua 29', 38'; Shabami 45'	Report		Stadium: El Kram Stadium

16 February 2020 UNAF Women's Tournament	Tunisia	3–0	Mauritania	El Kram, Tunisia
13:00	Laamiri 33'; Mchara 48' (pen.); Ben Mohamed 81'	Report		Stadium: El Kram Stadium

18 February 2020 UNAF Women's Tournament	Mauritania	0–5	Algeria	El Kram, Tunisia
11:00		Report	Boubezari 30'; Daoui 45'; Hadjar 52'; Kacem 57'; Merrouche 70'	Stadium: El Kram Stadium

20 February 2020 UNAF Women's Tournament	Morocco	5–0	Mauritania	El Kram, Tunisia
11:00	Amani 12'; Chebbak 20' (pen.), 38', 40'; Khirou 49'	Report		Stadium: El Kram Stadium

=== 2021 ===
20 October 2021 2022 AFWCON qualification First round 1st leg	Guinea-Bissau	1–0	Mauritania	Bissau, Guinea-Bissau
	Mané 73'	Report		Stadium: Estádio 24 de Setembro; Referee: Sylvina Garnett (Liberia)

26 October 2021 2022 AFWCON qualification First round 2nd leg	Mauritania	0–1 (0–2 agg.)	Guinea-Bissau	Nouakchott, Mauritania
		Report	Man 49'	Stadium: Stade Olympique; Referee: Félicité Kourouma (Guinea)
Note: Guinea-Bissau won 2–0 on aggregate.

=== 2023 ===
22 January 2023 WAFU Zone A Cup GS	Guinea-Bissau	1–0	Mauritania	Sal, Cape Verde
16:00	Paulo Mendes 55'	Report (FCF)		Stadium: Estádio Marcelo Leitão

24 January 2023 WAFU Zone A Cup GS	Mauritania	0–6	Cape Verde	Sal, Cape Verde
16:00		Report (FCF)	Moreira 7' (pen.), 17', 28', 62', 71'; Borges 59'	Stadium: Estádio Marcelo Leitão; Referee: Ngum Fatou (Gambia)

=== 2025 ===
22 May 2025 2025 WAFU Zone A Cup GS	Mauritania	0–5	Mali	Nouakchott, Mauritania
16:00		Report	Koné 5'; S. Diarra 14', 66'; Ag. Diarra 26'; Samaké 28'	Stadium: Cheikha Ould Boïdiya Stadium; Referee: Fatou Ngum (Gambia)

24 May 2025 2025 WAFU Zone A Cup GS	Liberia	1–1	Mauritania	Nouakchott, Mauritania
19:00	Morris 56'	Report	Diabira 87' (pen.)	Stadium: Cheikha Ould Boïdiya Stadium; Referee: Humu Marah (Sierra Leone)

26 May 2025 2025 WAFU Zone A Cup GS	Mauritania	2–0	Guinea-Bissau	Nouakchott, Mauritania
16:00	Gangué 54'; Diop 64'	Report		Stadium: Cheikha Ould Boïdiya Stadium; Referee: Félicité Kourouma (Guinea)

=== 2026 ===
9 April 2026 FIFA Series	Ivory Coast	8–0	Mauritania	Abidjan, Ivory Coast
19:30	Kreto 6', 13', 31'; B. Amani 23'; Ouédraogo 41', 43'; Dagba 65'; Abrogoua 79'	Report (FIFA)		Stadium: Alassane Ouattara Stadium; Referee: Jacqueline Nikiéma (Burkina Faso)

12 April 2026 FIFA Series	Mauritania	1–0	Pakistan	Abidjan, Ivory Coast
16:00	Gengui 20'	Report (FIFA)		Stadium: Alassane Ouattara Stadium; Referee: Odilone Ehui (Ivory Coast)

16 April 2026 FIFA Series	Turks and Caicos	0–6	Mauritania	Abidjan, Ivory Coast
16:00		Report (FIFA)	Diabira 17', 33' (pen.), 68'; Bilal 26', 58'; Fall 75'	Stadium: Alassane Ouattara Stadium; Referee: Natacha Konan (Ivory Coast)
