= 2019 COTIF Women's Football Tournament =

2019 L'Alcúdia International Women's Football Tournament
Cañamás Naranja COTIF Feminine

Tournament details
- Host country: Spain
- Dates: 1 August 2019 – 8 August 2019
- Teams: 5 (from 4 confederations)
- Venue: Els Arcs de (in Alcúdia host cities)

Final positions
- Champions: Spain U19 (1st title)
- Runners-up: (Spain) Villarreal U20

Tournament statistics
- Matches played: 11
- Goals scored: 48 (4.36 per match)
- Top scorer(s): (Spain) María Colonques (Spain) Irene López (4 Goals)
- All statistics correct as of 8 August 2019.

The 2019 L'Alcúdia International Football Tournament is a football competition which is being held from 1 August to 8 August 2019 at Els Arcs de, Alcúdia.

== Participating nations ==
All the five teams will play each other in a round robin phase and the top two teams will play the final.

Following national teams are participating :

- Bolivia U19 (CONMEBOL)
- Spain U19 (UEFA)
- India (AFC)
- Mauritania (CAF)
- Villarreal U20 (Spain)

== Group stage ==
- Times listed are UTC+02:00

Pos	Team	Pld	W	D	L	GF	GA	GD	Pts	Qualification
1	Spain U19 (H)	4	4	0	0	18	1	+17	12	Final
2	(Spain) Villarreal U20	4	3	0	1	13	4	+9	9	Final
3	India	4	2	0	2	10	5	+5	6	
4	Bolivia U19	4	1	0	3	6	8	−2	3	
5	Mauritania	4	0	0	4	1	29	−28	0	

Source: Cotif Website
(H) Hosts
1 August 2019
20:00

India	0–2	(Spain) Villarreal U20
	Report	Sheila Gomez 9'; Nazaret Padron 62'

Els Arcs de, Alcúdia
Attendance: 700
Referee: Galech Apezteguia
2 August 2019
20:00

Spain U19	11–0	Mauritania
Sara Carrillo 1'; Ainhoa Marín 8'; Leire Peña 11'; Irene López 29'; Asunción Martínez 35' (pen.); Alejandra Bernabé 37' (pen.); Aixa Salvador 47'; Isabel Pala 50'; Eva Alonso 61'; Ines Villanueva 65'; Carlota Sánchez 72' (pen.)	Report

Els Arcs de, Alcúdia
Attendance: 2500
Referee: Alejandro Muñiz Ruiz
3 August 2019
20:00

Bolivia U19	1–3	India
Sweety Devi 2' (o.g.)	Report	Bala Devi 5'; Nongmaithem Ratanbala Devi 36', 58'

Els Arcs de, Alcúdia
Attendance: 1000
Referee: César Soto Grado
4 August 2019
18:45

India	7–0	Mauritania
Manisha Kalyan 3'; Dangmei Grace 7', 32'; Ngangom Bala Devi 27'; Loitongbam Ashalata Devi 50' (pen.), 63' (pen.); Daya Devi 65'	report

Els Arcs de, Alcúdia
Attendance: 1500
Referee: Luis Mario Milla Alvendiz
4 August 2019
20:30

Spain U19	3–1	(Spain) Villarreal U20
Asunción Martínez 8'; Jana Fernández 14'; Ainhoa Marín 15'	Report	María Colonques 35'

Els Arcs de, Alcúdia
Attendance: 1400
Referee: Miguel Angel Ortiz Arias
5 August 2019
18:45

(Spain) Villarreal	6–1	Mauritania
Jessica Collado 7', 48'; Díaz 16'; Nazaret Segura 46'; María Colonques 50', 70' (pen.)	Report	Tacko Diabira 24'

Els Arcs de, Alcúdia
Attendance: 1500
Referee: Gorka Sagues Oscoz
5 August 2019
20:30

Spain U19	2–0	Bolivia U19
Irene López 8'; Paola Hernández 31'	Report

Els Arcs de, Alcúdia
Attendance: 1200
Referee: Iñaki Vicandi Garrido
6 August 2019
18:45

Bolivia U19	0–3	(Spain) Villarreal U20
	Report	María Colonques 7'; Sheila Gomez 43' (pen.); Albeta 70'

Els Arcs de, Alcúdia
Attendance: 800
Referee: Daniel Ocon Arraiz
7 July 2019
18:45

Bolivia U19	5–0	Mauritania
Doerksen 1', 31', 36'; Veizaga 9', 46'	Report

Els Arcs de, Alcúdia
Attendance: 1500
Referee: José Antonio López Toca
7 August 2019
20:30

Spain U19	2–0	India
Jana Fernández 15'; Irene López 64' (pen.)	Report

Els Arcs de, Alcúdia
Attendance: 2500
Referee: Oliver De la Fuente Ramos

== Final ==
8 August 2019
20:00

Spain U19	1–0	(Spain) Villarreal U20
Irene López 61'	Report

Els Arcs de, Alcúdia
Attendance: 4000
Referee: Esteban Jon Ander González

== Top scorers ==
As of 8 August 2019

Rank	Player	Country	Goals
1	María Colonques	(Spain) Villarreal U20	4
1	Irene López	Spain U19	4
3	Doerksen	Bolivia U19	3
4	Nongmaithem Ratanbala Devi	India	2
4	Dangmei Grace	India	2
4	Ngangom Bala Devi	India	2
4	Loitongbam Ashalata Devi	India	2
4	Asunción Martinez	Spain U19	2
4	Ainhoa Marín	Spain U19	2
4	Jessica Collado	(Spain) Villarreal U20	2
4	Sheila Gomez	(Spain) Villarreal U20	2
4	Veizaga	Bolivia U19	2
