= Sahiba Sherdil =

Pakistani footballer

Personal information
- Full name: Sahiba Sherdil Baloch
- Date of birth: 21 December 2001 (age 24)
- Place of birth: Maripur, Karachi, Pakistan
- Height: 1.65 m (5 ft 5 in)
- Position: Centre-back

Team information
- Current team: Karachi United
- Number: 4

Youth career
- 2016–2018: JAFA

Senior career*
| Years | Team | Apps | (Gls) |
| 2018–2021 | JAFA | | |
| 2022– | Karachi United | 13 | (1) |

International career^{‡}
| 2023– | Pakistan | 1 | (0) |
- * Club domestic league appearances and goals as of 23:00, 16 January 2024 (UTC) ‡ National team caps and goals as of 23:00, 16 January 2024 (UTC)

Sahiba Sherdil Baloch (Urdu: صاحبہ سردل بلوچ; born 21 Dec 2001), also known as Sahiba Sirdil or Sahiba Sardil, is a Pakistani footballer who plays as a defender for Karachi United WFC, which she captains, and the Pakistan women's national team.

== Early life ==
Born and raised in the village of Maripur in Karachi, in the Sindh province, Sahiba started playing football at a young age with her elder cousins and, at one stage, contemplated quitting the game. Despite facing many obstacles, she continued to pursue her dream to become a professional football player.

== Club career ==
=== JAFA ===
Sahiba began her youth career after the completion of her intermediate education with Lyari club JAFA in 2019.

=== Karachi United ===
In 2022, she was signed by Karachi United WFC, where she then went to the Pakistan women's national team camp and got selected for the senior team. She was named captain of the Karachi United team in 2023. She led the team to the runner-up position at the Futsal National Championship 2024 Karachi edition. She also led the team to 3rd place at the 2024 National Women Football Championship. She also scored a goal during the opening group stage match in Karachi.

== International career ==
In December 2022, Sahiba was called for preparatory camps after years of inactivity in football due to the suspension on the Pakistan Football Federation by FIFA. Following the initial trials, she was included in Pakistan's senior squad for the SAFF Women's International Friendly Tournament in Saudi Arabia. She made her debut as a starter, in a 2–1 defeat against Mauritius on 15 January 2023.

She was also a part of the squad that took part in the 2024 AFC Women's Olympic Qualifying Tournament held in Tajikistan for Group E. The team recorded their first win in the Olympic Qualifiers against Tajikistan, with a 1–0 victory. In June 2023, she was named in the squad for further friendlies between 10 and 18 July.

== Career statistics ==
=== International ===
As of 21 July 2024

Appearances and goals by national team and year
| National team | Year | Apps | Goals |
|---|---|---|---|
| Pakistan | 2023 | 1 | 0 |
| Total | | 1 | 0 |

== Honours ==
Karachi United

- National Women Football Championship: third place: 2024
