= 2026 FIFA Series =

The 2026 FIFA Series is an association football competition of international friendlies. Articles can be referred to as:

- 2026 FIFA Series (men's matches)
- 2026 FIFA Series (women's matches)
