= Karachi City WFC =

Pakistani football club

Karachi City
- Full name: Karachi City Women Football Club
- Short name: KCWFC
- Founded: 2021; 5 years ago
- Ground: Various
- Chairman: Adeel Rizki
- Manager: Shahzaib Ahmed Khan
- League: National Women Football Championship
- 2024: Champions
- Website: karachicityfc.com
Home colours	Away colours

Karachi City Women's Football Club is a Pakistani professional women's association football club based in Karachi.

Founded in 2021, the club is affiliated with Karachi City men team. Primarily focused on grassroots football development, the club rapidly emerged as one of the top talent-nurturing academies in Pakistan. The club won the 2024 National Women Football Championship in their first participation in the country's top flight domestic circuit. The club participated in the inaugural SAFF Women's Club Championship in 2025.

== History ==
=== Early years (2021–2024) ===
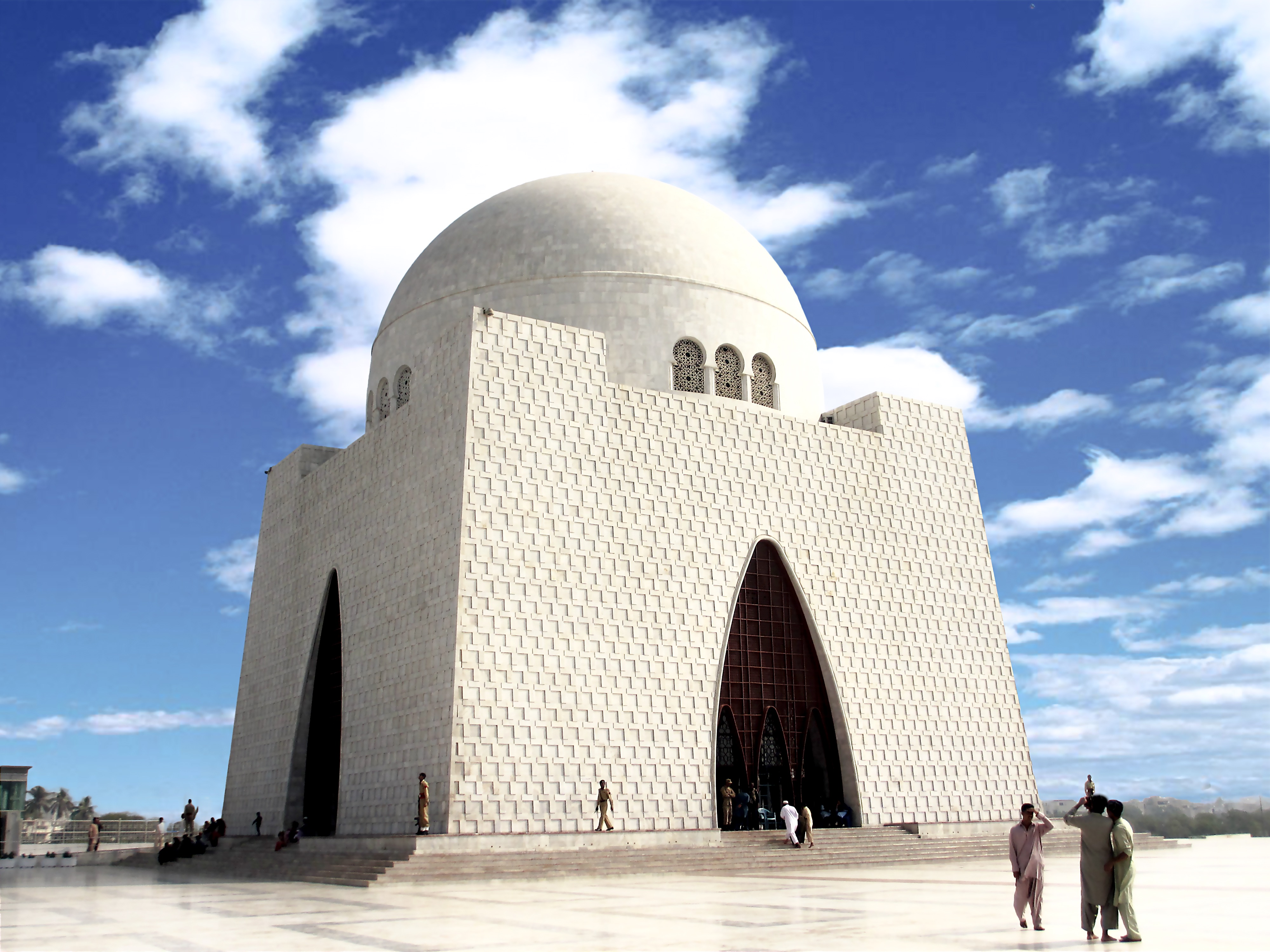
The Mazar-e-Quaid monument in Karachi is featured on the club crest

The club was formed in 2021 by football coach Adeel Rizki, along with businessman and co-founder Shahzaib Ahmed Khan in Karachi. Primarily focused on grassroots football development, the club rapidly emerged as one of the top talent-nurturing academies in Pakistan. After the appointment of Rizki as coach of the Pakistan women's national team in 2022, most of the club players featured internationally. In April 2024, futsal section secured the Women's Futsal Championship title after an 11–0 victory over the city rivals Karachi United.

=== Top-flight (2024–present) ===
Karachi City won the title their first participation at the top-tier women competition at the 2024 National Women Football Championship. The team included several notable international players such as Zulfia Nazir, and several overseas players including Nadia Khan and Zahmena Malik. In their first match in the group stage, Karachi City achieved a historic victory by defeating Jahangir Memorial WFC with a score of 44–0. In their next match, the club hammered Mohsen Gillani WFC by 33–0. The win resulted in Karachi City winning their three-team group with 6 points and a staggering +77 goal difference in two matches. After several goal dominated wins, the team reached the semifinals, consequently winning against Hazara Quetta by 8–0. The team clinched the title after winning against Legacy WFC by 4–0. British Pakistani Nadia Khan was declared player of the tournament, along with Nisha Ashraf who was awarded the best goalkeeper.

== Crest and colors ==
Karachi City's colors are blue, white and black. Traditionally blue is used as the home color and white as the away. The club represents Mazar-e-Quaid on their logo, one of the most popular monuments in honour of the country's founder Muhammad Ali Jinnah.

== Continental record ==
Win	Draw	Loss

Season	Competition	Round	Club	Result	Position	Top scorer(s)	Goals
2025–26
2025–26	SWCC	Group Stage	(Bhutan) Transport United	0–0	4th in Group stage	—	—
2025–26	SWCC	Group Stage	(Bangladesh) Nasrin	0–0	4th in Group stage	—	—
2025–26	SWCC	Group Stage	(India) East Bengal	0–2	4th in Group stage	—	—
2025–26	SWCC	Group Stage	(Nepal) APF	0–1	4th in Group stage	—	—

== Honours ==
Cup

- National Women Football Championship
  - Champions (1): 2024
