= Marsha Malik =

Pakistani footballer

Personal information
- Full name: Marsha Malik
- Date of birth: 20 August 2001 (age 25)
- Place of birth: Edgbaston, England
- Height: 1.68 m (5 ft 6 in)
- Position: Attacking midfielder

Team information
- Current team: Hednesford Town WFC
- Number: 8

Senior career*
Years	Team	Apps	(Gls)
2022–2023	West Bromwich Albion	22	(7)
2023–2025	Solihull Moors	30	(4)
2024	→ Karachi United (loan)	7	(7)
2025–2026	Lye Town WFC	3	(2)
2026	Hednesford Town WFC	4	(1)

International career^{‡}
2025–	Pakistan	1	(0)
- * Club domestic league appearances and goals as of 23:00, 16 January 2024 (UTC) ‡ National team caps and goals as of 23:00, 16 January 2024 (UTC)

Marsha Malik (Urdu: مارشا ملک; born 20 August 2001), is a Pakistani footballer who plays as a midfielder for Lye Town and the Pakistan women's national team.

== Early life ==
Born and raised in Edgbaston, Marsha initially started playing tennis in the hopes of going pro. She played in various tennis tournaments and in 2015 played for the U16's team at Wimbledon where she suffered a severe injury before switching to football.

== Club career ==
=== West Bromwich Albion ===
Marsha began her career with West Bromwich Albion in 2022 where she stayed for one season.

=== Solihull Moors ===
Marsha then transferred to Solihull Moors in 2023. She was named the Uber Eats Player of the Month for the month of March. She was also awarded the Supporters Player of the Season 2024–25.

==== 2024: Loan to Karachi United ====
In 2024, she was signed on loan by Karachi United WFC for the upcoming 2024 National Women Football Championship. She was the joint top scorer for the team with 7 goals to her name and a hat-trick in the third-place playoff as the team finished in third.

=== Lye Town ===
She joined Lye Town at the start of the 2025–26 season.

=== Hednesford Town ===
She joined Hednesford Town WFC in March of 2026 season.

== International career ==
In June 2025, Marsha was called for the national football team as they were to travel for the 2026 AFC Women's Asian Cup qualification, where Pakistan was drawn in group D alongside hosts Indonesia, Kyrgyzstan, and Chinese Taipei. Pakistan finished the group as runners-up with 2 wins and a loss to group winners Chinese Taipei.

== Career statistics ==
=== International ===
As of 31 August 2025

Appearances and goals by national team and year
National team	Year	Apps	Goals
Pakistan	2025	1	0
Total		1	0

== Honours ==
Karachi United

- National Women Football Championship: third place: 2024
