= Yunelsis Rodríguez =

Cuban footballer

Personal information
- Full name: Yunelsis Rodríguez Báez
- Date of birth: 21 June 1977 (age 49)
- Position: Defender

Senior career*
Years	Team	Apps	(Gls)
2012	Camagüey		

International career^{‡}
2012	Cuba	2	(0)

Managerial career
- 2018-: Turks and Caicos Islands
- * Club domestic league appearances and goals ‡ National team caps and goals as of 23 January 2012

Yunelsis Rodríguez Báez (born 21 June 1977) is a Cuban retired footballer who played as a defender. She has been a member of the Cuba women's national team. She is currently the coach of the Turks and Caicos Islands women's national team.

== International career ==
Rodríguez capped for Cuba at senior level during the 2012 CONCACAF Women's Olympic Qualifying Tournament.
