= Lionnes Assa-Mahbès =

Women's football club in Assa

- Full name: Association Lionnes Assa-Mahbes de Football Feminin
- Short name: Lionnes Assa-Mahbès (ALAMFF)
- Founded: 2005; 21 years ago
- President: El Batoul Tamek
- Coach: Samira Louguid
- League: Moroccan Division 1 Féminine
- 2024–25: D2, 2nd of 28 (promoted)
Home colours	Away colours	Third colours

Association Lionnes Assa-Mahbes de Football Feminin (Arabic: جمعية لبؤات أسا-المحبس لكرة القدم النسوية), shortly known as Lionnes Assa-Mahbès is a professional women's football club based in Assa, Assa-Zag Province. The club will compete in the Moroccan Division 1 Féminine, a league at the top of the Moroccan Football pyramid.

== History ==
Established in 2005, the club was initially known as Association Union Sportive Féminine Assa-Zag. In August 2022, club president Tamek announced that the team was being put up for sale through its official Facebook page, citing the lack of stable financial resources needed to sustain participation in the upcoming season. The announcement served as a warning call to local authorities and stakeholders, highlighting the club's ongoing struggles despite over a decade of competing at the top level with minimal support.

In May 2024, the club became the first women's team to play in the top professional national league wearing jerseys featuring the map of the disputed Kingdom of Morocco, in a show of support for RS Berkane following the map-related controversy in the CAF Confederation Cup.

In August 2024, the club was renamed Lionnes Assa-Mahbes as part of a step aimed at renewing spirit and enthusiasm while strengthening the team's sporting identity. In May 2025, the team secured promotion back to the top flight after just one season in the second division, having finished first in the South Group of their division.

== Players ==
=== Current players ===
As of 17 May 2025

Note: Flags indicate national team as defined under FIFA eligibility rules; some limited exceptions apply. Players may hold more than one non-FIFA nationality.

No.	Pos.	Nation	Player
1	GK	MAR	Essalima Sghir
2	DF	MTN	Coumba Gueye
3	DF	MAR	Roukia Arsalan
5	DF	GHA	Joyce Asamoah
6	MF	MAR	Nouhaila Sadeq
7	MF	MAR	Ibtissam El Bakouk
8		MAR	Riham El Bouzidi
9		MAR	Halima Olkma
10		MAR	Imane Hannoun
11		MAR	Fatima-Zahra El Mesbahi

No.	Pos.	Nation	Player
12	GK	MAR	Hakima Jabri
13		MAR	Zineb Zitouni
14		MAR	Khadija Targhalline
15		MAR	Dena El Gharbaoui
17		MAR	Hiba Chichaoui
18	MF	EQG	Constantina Asú
21	FW	BFA	Fadiratou Tarnagda
24		MAR	Chaimae El Bouhssini
25		MAR	Salma Benyounes
99		MAR	Najat Nahid

=== Notable former players ===
- Mauritania
  - Fatou Diop
- Tanzania
  - Enekia Lunyamila
  - Diana Msewa
