= Zeeyana Jivraj =

Canadian-Pakistani footballer (born 2000)

Personal information
- Full name: Zeeyana Jivraj
- Date of birth: 26 January 2000 (age 26)
- Place of birth: Toronto, Ontario, Canada
- Position: Goalkeeper

Team information
- Current team: Hazargi Atalan Kabul SC
- Number: 1

College career
Years	Team	Apps	(Gls)
2019–2023	Youngstown State Penguins	–	(0)

Senior career*
Years	Team	Apps	(Gls)
2023	Hibernian W.F.C.		
2024–	Northern Colorado Rain FC		
2026	Hazargi Atalan Kabul SC		

International career
2025–	Pakistan	3	(0)
- * Club domestic league appearances and goals

Zeeyana Jivraj (born 26 January 2000) is a professional footballer who plays as a goalkeeper for Northern Colorado Rain FC in the USL W League. Born in Canada, she represents the Pakistan women's national football team.

== Early life and education ==
Born in Pickering, Ontario, Jivraj excelled both academically and athletically. She earned a full scholarship to Youngstown State University and graduated summa cum laude with a degree in pre-med biology and a minor in chemistry. She was also a Horizon League All-Academic and All-Conference honoree.

== Club career ==
In 2023, Jivraj signed her first professional contract with Hibernian W.F.C. in Malta and debuted with a clean sheet against Valletta.

In 2024, Jivraj signed her second professional contract with Clube de Albergaria in Liga BPI, Portugal's top flight. In her debut match, she recorded the clubs first clean sheet of the season.

She later returned to the United States and joined Northern Colorado Rain FC in 2024. In her debut season, she recorded 4 clean sheets in 6 matches and was re-signed for 2025.

Jivraj currently is a practice player for Dallas Trinity in the Gainbridge Superleague in America and is a free agent.

== International career ==
In June 2025, Jivraj was named to Pakistan’s 22-player squad for the 2026 AFC Women's Asian Cup qualification round as one of six new diaspora players added to the national setup.

== Style of play ==
Jivraj is known for her communication, footwork, and sharp reflexes. Hibernian W.F.C. coach Eleanor Saliba described her as a “vocal leader from the back who commands the box confidently.”

== Personal life ==
She captained the women's football team at the University of Essex while pursuing postgraduate studies. Jivraj is also active in youth mentorship and sports leadership initiatives.
