= Adeel Rizki =

Pakistani football manager

Personal information
- Place of birth: Karachi, Pakistan

Managerial career
- Years: Team
- 2013–2016: Karachi United
- 2013–2016: Karachi United WFC
- 2022–2026: Pakistan Women
- 2025–2026: Pakistan (assistant)

Adeel Rizki (Urdu: عدیل رزکی) is a Technical Director of Pakistan Football Federation (PFF) who has served as head coach of the Pakistan women's national football team since 2022.

== Career ==
=== Karachi United ===
Rizki obtained a UEFA B Licence before obtaining a UEFA A License and started his managerial career with Pakistanis side Karachi United. He also led the Karachi United women team In 2016 he was head coach of Karachi United’s first team that reached the final round of the 2016 Pakistan Football Federation Cup.

After leaving Karachi United, Rizki founded Karachi City FC in 2021. He also worked for the youth academies of various Canadian sides.

=== Pakistan women national team ===
In 2022, he was appointed manager of the Pakistan women's national football team. However, the Pakistan Football Federation was accused of nepotism regarding his appointment. His initial appointment drew debate over licensing, at the start of 2023 he held a UEFA B, while AFC national team guidance typically expected a Pro-Licence head coach. Dawn reported that he was nonetheless cleared to coach the 2024 AFC Olympic Qualifiers because those fixtures did not have binding qualification requirements for coaches. During his tenure, he was regarded to have had a short temper and displayed preferential treatment to Pakistani diaspora players.

In February 2024, Rizki had obtained the UEFA A Licence, one tier below the Pro license.
