= Mauritania women's national football team =

Women's national association football team representing Mauritania

Mauritania
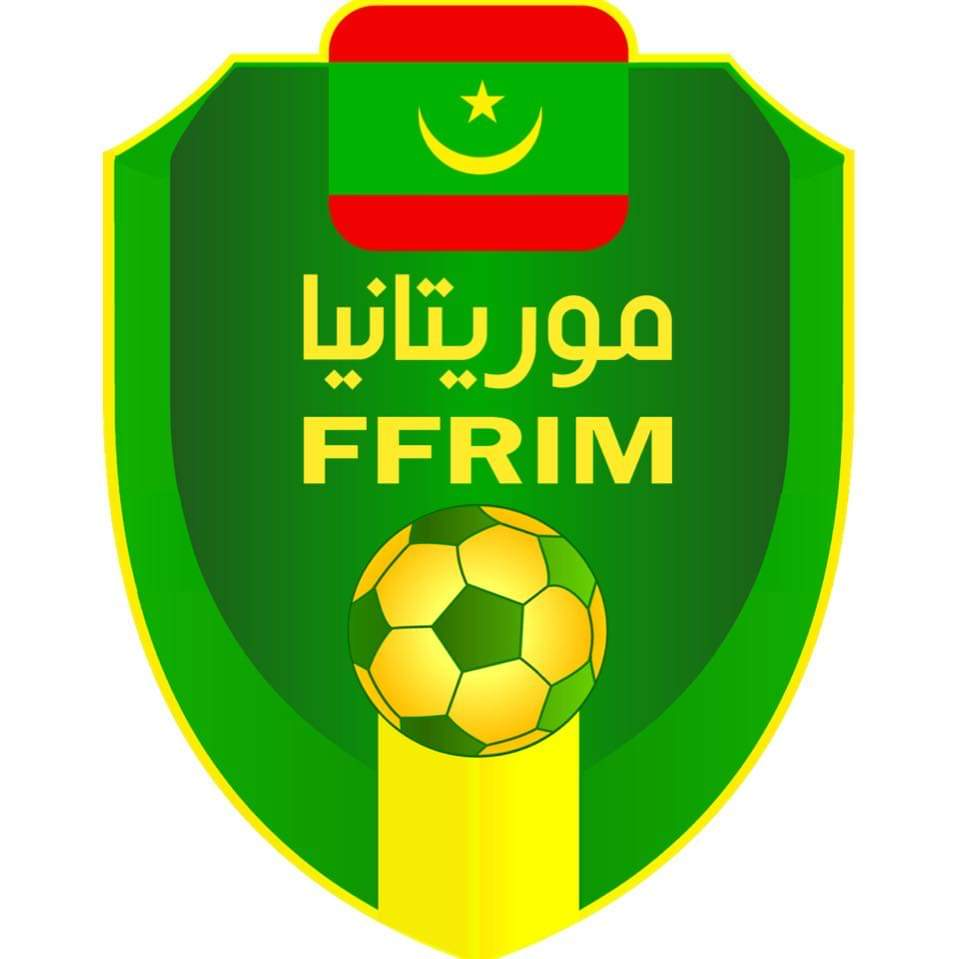
- Nickname: Mourabitounes
- Association: Football Federation of the Islamic Republic of Mauritania
- Confederation: CAF (Africa)
- Sub-confederation: WAFU (West Africa)
- Head coach: (Spain) Jordi Arimany
- Captain: Fatou Diop
- Top scorer: Tacko Diabira (4)
- FIFA code: MTN

FIFA ranking
- Current: NR (16 June 2026)

First international
- Mauritania 1–3 Djibouti (Nouakchott, Mauritania; 30 July 2019)

Biggest win
- Turks and Caicos Islands 0–6 Mauritania (Abidjan, Côte d'Ivoire; 16 April 2026)

Biggest defeat
- Ivory Coast 8–0 Mauritania (Abidjan, Côte d'Ivoire; 9 April 2026)

WAFU Zone A Women's Cup
- Appearances: 2 (first in 2023)
- Best result: Group Stage (2023, 2025)

The Mauritania women's national football team (Arabic: منتخب موريتانيا لكرة القدم للسيدات, French: Équipe Nationale féminine de football de Mauritanie) represents Mauritania in international women's football and is controlled by the Football Federation of the Islamic Republic of Mauritania (FFIRM). The team played its first international match in 2019 as a friendly against Djibouti in which they lost three to one. Fatou Diop scored Mauritania's first international goal.

== History ==
=== The team ===
Mauritania did not play in a single FIFA sanctioned match between 1950 and June 2012. The country did not have a FIFA recognised national senior or junior team in 2006, and was unchanged in 2009. In 2010, the country did not have a team competing in the African Women's Championships during the preliminary rounds. The country did not have a team competing at the 2011 All Africa Games. In March 2012, the team was not ranked in the world by FIFA.

=== Federation ===
The national association, the Football Federation of the Islamic Republic of Mauritania, was founded in 1961 and became a FIFA affiliate in 1964. Women's football is not represented by rule in the federation and they do not employ anyone specifically to manage the women's football. The federation has not participated in any FIFA sanctioned training courses for women's football. Most of the funding for women's football in the country and for the women's national team comes from FIFA, not the national football association.

=== Background and development ===
Football is the second most popular women's sport in the country, behind basketball which is number one. In 2006, there were 100 registered female football players in the country, the first time such numbers were tracked. Opportunities for play are limited as there are only four women's football teams in the country, women's football is not organised at schools, and mixed football is not allowed.

The lack of development of the national team on a wider international level is symptomatic of wider problems on the continent, including limited access to education, poverty amongst women in the wider society, and fundamental inequality present in the society (especially present in Muslim-majority religious state countries, Mauritania being one such country) that occasionally allows for female-specific human rights abuses. Early development of the women's game at the time colonial powers brought football to the continent was limited as colonial powers in the region tended to take make concepts of patriarchy and women's participation in sport with them to local cultures that had similar concepts already embedded in them. Continent wide, if quality female football players do develop, they leave for greater opportunities abroad. Future, success for women's football in Africa is dependent on improved facilities and access by women to these facilities. Attempting to commercialise the game and make it commercially is not the solution, as demonstrated by the many youth and women's football camps held on the continent.

== Team image ==
=== Nicknames ===
The Mauritania women's national football team have been nicknamed the "Mourabitounes".

== Results and fixtures ==
The following is a list of match results in the last 12 months, as well as any future matches that have been scheduled.

Win Draw Lose Fixture

=== 2026 ===
9 April 2026 FIFA Series	Ivory Coast	8–0	Mauritania	Abidjan, Ivory Coast
19:30	Kreto 6', 13', 31'; B. Amani 23'; Ouédraogo 41', 43'; Dagba 65'; Abrogoua 79'	Report (FIFA)		Stadium: Alassane Ouattara Stadium; Referee: Jacqueline Nikiéma (Burkina Faso)

12 April 2026 FIFA Series	Mauritania	1–0	Pakistan	Abidjan, Ivory Coast
16:00	Gengui 20'	Report (FIFA)		Stadium: Alassane Ouattara Stadium; Referee: Odilone Ehui (Ivory Coast)

16 April 2026 FIFA Series	Turks and Caicos	0–6	Mauritania	Abidjan, Ivory Coast
16:00		Report (FIFA)	Diabira 17', 33' (pen.), 68'; Bilal 26', 58'; Fall 75'	Stadium: Alassane Ouattara Stadium; Referee: Natacha Konan (Ivory Coast)

== Coaching staff ==
=== Current coaching staff ===
As of 2 December 2023

Position	Name	Ref.
Head coach	(Spain) Jordi Arimany	

=== Manager history ===
- (Mauritania) Abdallahi Diallo (2019–2023)
- (Spain) Jordi Arimany (2023–present)

== Players ==
=== Current squad ===
The following list is the final squad for 2025 WAFU Zone A Women's Cup announced on 20 May 2025.

Caps and goals accurate up to and including 9 July 2021.

No.	Pos.	Player	Date of birth (age)	Club
	GK	Salimata Samba		(Football Federation of the Islamic Republic of Mauritania) FC Nouadhibou
	GK	Aissata Fall		(Football Federation of the Islamic Republic of Mauritania) FC Nouadhibou
	GK	Marietou Sagna		(Football Federation of the Islamic Republic of Mauritania) AS Douanes
	DF	Maimouna Diallo		(Football Federation of the Islamic Republic of Mauritania) FC Nouadhibou
	DF	Meije Cissé		(Senegalese Football Federation) FC Baobab
	DF	Fatou Diop	5 May 1994 (aged 31)	(Royal Moroccan Football Federation) Union Touarga
	DF	Fatimata Sall		(Football Federation of the Islamic Republic of Mauritania) ASC Snim
	DF	Coumba Gueye		(Royal Moroccan Football Federation) Union Assa-Zag
	DF	Salma Moctar Vall		(Football Federation of the Islamic Republic of Mauritania) AS Douanes
	MF	Ami Gaye		(Football Federation of the Islamic Republic of Mauritania) FC Nouadhibou
	MF	Halima Diallo		(Football Federation of the Islamic Republic of Mauritania) ASC Snim
	MF	Ramata Gangué		(Royal Moroccan Football Federation) AM Laâyoune (Note: AMFF Laâyoune is a Western Saharan-based club playing in the Moroccan football league system.)
	MF	Leila Blal		(Football Federation of the Islamic Republic of Mauritania) FC Nouadhibou
	MF	El Ghaiba Fall		(Football Federation of the Islamic Republic of Mauritania) Chemal FC
	MF	Rougui Dia		(Football Federation of the Islamic Republic of Mauritania) Chemal FC
	FW	Zeinebou Ahmed		(Football Federation of the Islamic Republic of Mauritania) Chemal FC
	FW	Aminata Diakite		(Football Federation of the Islamic Republic of Mauritania) FC Nouadhibou
	FW	Tacko Diabira		(Senegalese Football Federation) AS Dakar Sacré-Cœur
	FW	Hawa Dicko		(Football Federation of the Islamic Republic of Mauritania) AS Douanes
	FW	Mariem Diadie Traore		(Football Federation of the Islamic Republic of Mauritania) FC Nouadhibou

=== Recent call-ups ===
The following players have been called up to a Mauritania squad in the past 12 months.

Pos.	Player	Date of birth (age)	Caps	Goals	Club	Latest call-up
^{INJ} Player withdrew from the squad due to an injury.^{PRE} Preliminary squad.^{SUS} Player is serving a suspension.^{WD} Player withdrew for personal reasons.

=== Previous squads ===
- First match selection

WAFU Zone A Women's Cup

- 2023 WAFU Zone A Women's Cup squads

== Records ==
*Active players in bold, statistics correct as of 2021.

=== Most capped players ===
#	Player	Year(s)	Caps

=== Top goalscorers ===
updated 14/09/2026

#	Player	Year(s)	Goals
**1**	Tacko Diabira	2019–present	5
**2**	Fatou Diop	2019–present	2
**2**	Ramata Gangué	2019–present	2
**2**	Leila Bilal	2019–present	2
**5**	Ghaiba Fall	2019–present	1

== Competitive record ==
=== FIFA Women's World Cup ===
FIFA Women's World Cup record
Year	Result	Pld	W	D*	L	GF	GA	GD	Squad	Coach
(China) 1991 to (France) 2019	Did not exist									
(Australia) (New Zealand) 2023	Did not qualify									
(Brazil) 2027	To be determined									
(Mexico) (United States) 2031	To be determined									
(United Kingdom) 2035	To be determined									
Total	0/1	–	–	–	–	–	–	–	—	

*Draws include knockout matches decided on penalty kicks.

=== Olympic Games ===
Summer Olympics record
Year	Result	Pld	W	D*	L	GS	GA	GD
(United States) 1996 to (Brazil) 2016	Did not exist							
(Japan) 2020 to (France) 2024	Did not enter							
Total	0/8	0	0	0	0	0	0	0

*Draws include knockout matches decided on penalty kicks.

=== Africa Women Cup of Nations ===
Africa Women Cup of Nations record
Year	Round	GP	W	D*	L	GS	GA	GD
1991 to (Ghana) 2018	Did not exist							
2020	Cancelled due to COVID-19 pandemic in Africa							
(Morocco) 2022	Did not qualify							
(Morocco) 2024	Did not enter							
Total	0/2	0	0	0	0	0	0	0

*Draws include knockout matches decided on penalty kicks.

=== African Games ===
African Games record
Year	Result	Matches	Wins	Draws	Loses	GF	GA	GD
(Nigeria) 2003 to (Republic of the Congo) 2015	Did not exist							
(Morocco) 2019	Did not qualify							
(Ghana) 2023	Withdrew							
Total	0/4	0	0	0	0	0	0	0

=== WAFU Women's Cup record ===
WAFU Zone A Women's Cup record
Year	Result	Pld	W	D*	L	GF	GA	GD	Squad	Coach
(Sierra Leone) 2020	Did not enter									
(Cape Verde) 2023	Group stage	2	0	0	2	0	7	−7	Squad	Abdoulaye Diallo
(Mauritania) 2025	Group stage	3	1	1	1	3	6	−3	Squad	(Spain) Jordi Arimany
Total	2/3	5	1	1	3	3	13	−10	—	

=== Arab Women's Championship ===
Arab Women's Championship record
Appearances: 1
Year	Round	Position	Pld	W	D	L	GF	GA	GD
(Egypt) 2006	Did not exist								
(Egypt) 2021	Did not enter								
Total	Third	2/2	10	4	3	3	33	12	+21

== All−time record against FIFA recognized nations ==
Key

Positive balance (more wins than losses)
Neutral balance (as many wins as losses)
Negative balance (more losses than wins)

The following table shows Mauritania' all-time official international record per opponent:

Opponent	Pld	W	D	L	GF	GA	GD	W%	Confederation
Algeria	1	0	0	1	0	5	−5	0	CAF
Cape Verde	1	0	0	1	0	6	−6	0	CAF
Djibouti	1	0	0	1	1	3	−2	0	CAF
Guinea-Bissau	4	1	0	3	2	3	−1	25	CAF
Ivory Coast	1	0	0	1	0	8	−8	0	CAF
Liberia	1	0	1	0	1	1	0	0	CAF
Mali	1	0	0	1	0	5	−5	0	CAF
Morocco	1	0	0	1	0	5	−5	0	CAF
Pakistan	1	1	0	0	1	0	+1	100	AFC
Tanzania	1	0	0	1	0	7	−7	0	CAF
Tunisia	1	0	0	1	0	3	−3	0	CAF
Turks and Caicos Islands	1	1	0	0	6	0	+6	100	CONCACAF
Total	15	3	1	11	11	46	−33	20	—

Last updated: Turks and Caicos Islands v Mauritania, 16 April 2026.

== See also ==
- Sport in Mauritania
  - Football in Mauritania
    - Women's football in Mauritania
- Mauritania women's national under-20 football team
- Mauritania women's national under-17 football team
