= Rosemonde Kouassi =

Ivorian footballer (born 2001)

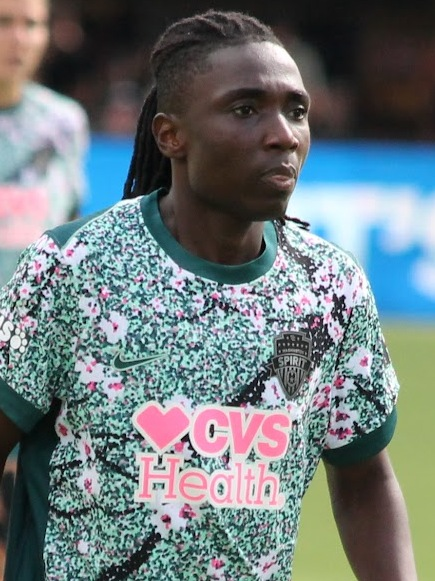
- Kouassi with the Washington Spirit in 2026

Personal information
- Full name: Amenan Joëlle Rosemonde Kouassi
- Date of birth: 26 December 2001 (age 24)
- Place of birth: Tontonou, Toumodi, Ivory Coast
- Height: 1.64 m (5 ft 5 in)
- Position: Forward

Team information
- Current team: Washington Spirit
- Number: 19

Senior career*
| Years | Team | Apps | (Gls) |
| –2019 | Juventus Yopougon | | |
| 2020–2021 | Hapoel Ra'anana | 5 | (3) |
| 2022–2024 | Fleury | 16 | (9) |
| 2024– | Washington Spirit | 49 | (4) |

International career^{‡}
| 2019– | Ivory Coast | 3 | (0) |
- * Club domestic league appearances and goals as of 05:26, 15 November 2026 (UTC) ‡ National team caps and goals as of 12 November 2019

Amenan Joëlle Rosemonde Kouassi (born 26 December 2001) is an Ivorian professional footballer who plays as a forward for the Washington Spirit of the National Women's Soccer League (NWSL) and the Ivory Coast national team. She previously played for Division 1 Féminine club Fleury and was named in the league's team of the season two times.

== Club career ==
=== Early career ===
Kouassi started out with Ivorian club Juventus Yopougon before going overseas to sign with Hapoel Ra'anana in Israel in 2019. After an impressive start with three goals in her first two games, she struggled and returned to the Ivory Coast, signing with Africa Sports in November 2020. There she won the Côte d'Ivoire Women's Championship in 2020–21 and was named the best player of the season.

=== Fleury ===
In November 2021, Kouassi and her compatriot Mariam Diakité signed with French club Fleury on a one-year deal. She scored her first goal for the club in a 4–0 win against Saint-Étienne in the Division 1 Féminine on 13 November. On 17 April 2022, she scored the opening goal in a 2–1 loss to league champions Lyon. She finished the 2021–22 season with 6 goals in 14 games as Fleury placed fourth in the league. In her first season, she was named Division 1 Féminine Player of the Month twice, named Best Young Player, and named in the Team of the Season. She was also named the best Ivorian player abroad. After the season, she signed a new three-year deal with Fleury.

On 20 January 2023, Kouassi scored two goals in a 4–4 draw against Paris Saint-Germain. She finished the 2022–23 season with 10 goals (sixth in the league) and 5 assists in 20 games as Fleury again placed fourth. She was again named in the D1 Team of the Season.

Kouassi finished the 2023–24 season with 5 goals and 3 assists in 19 games. Fleury dropped one place to fifth in the league.

=== Washington Spirit ===
On 10 July 2024, the Washington Spirit announced that they had signed Kouassi to a four-year contract on a transfer from Fleury. While she did not score in her first NWSL season, she made 2 assists in 8 games (7 starts) as the Spirit finished second in the standings behind the Orlando Pride. On 20 October, she was handed a red card and two-match suspension for an incident with the Chicago Red Stars's Ludmila, who received a three-game suspension. In the playoffs, Kouassi started in the semifinal and championship game, where Washington lost 1–0 to Orlando.

On 11 May 2025, Kouassi scored her first NWSL goal and provided the assist to Gift Monday's game-winner as the Spirit won 3–2 against the Chicago Stars. On 15 August, she scored a curling stoppage-time goal from the edge of the box to salvage a 2–2 draw against Racing Louisville. Four days later, she scored a hat trick in the Spirit's continental debut as they won 7–0 over Salvadoran club Alianza in the CONCACAF W Champions Cup group stage.

On 23 May 2026, Kouassi scored twice in a thwarted comeback against Club América in the CONCACAF W Champions Cup final. She was the tournament's leading scorer with six goals.

== International career ==
Kouassi capped for Ivory Coast at senior level during the 2020 CAF Women's Olympic Qualifying Tournament.

=== International goals ===
| No. | Date | Venue | Opponent | Score | Result | Competition |
|---|---|---|---|---|---|---|
| 1. | 10 May 2019 | Parc des sports de Treichville, Abidjan, Ivory Coast | Senegal | 2–0 | 4–0 | 2019 WAFU Zone B Women's Cup |
| 2. | 10 May 2019 | Parc des sports de Treichville, Abidjan, Ivory Coast | Senegal | 3–0 | 4–0 | 2019 WAFU Zone B Women's Cup |
| 3. | 20 October 2021 | Stade Général Seyni Kountché, Niamey, Niger | Niger | 9–0 | 9–0 | 2022 Women's Africa Cup of Nations qualification |
| 4. | 25 October 2021 | Stade Robert Champroux, Abidjan, Ivory Coast | Niger | 5–0 | 11–0 | 2022 Women's Africa Cup of Nations qualification |
| 5. | 25 October 2021 | Stade Robert Champroux, Abidjan, Ivory Coast | Niger | 9–0 | 11–0 | 2022 Women's Africa Cup of Nations qualification |
| 6. | 25 October 2021 | Stade Robert Champroux, Abidjan, Ivory Coast | Niger | 11–0 | 11–0 | 2022 Women's Africa Cup of Nations qualification |
| 7. | 30 May 2025 | Felix Houphouet Boigny Stadium, Abidjan, Ivory Coast | Ghana | 2–3 | 3–3 | Friendly |
| 8. | 12 April 2026 | Alassane Ouattara Stadium, Abidjan, Ivory Coast | Turks and Caicos Islands | 7–1 | 15–1 | 2026 FIFA Series |
| 9. | 5 June 2026 | Felix Houphouet Boigny Stadium, Abidjan, Ivory Coast | Cape Verde | 1–0 | 3–0 | Friendly |
| 10. | 5 June 2026 | Felix Houphouet Boigny Stadium, Abidjan, Ivory Coast | Cape Verde | 3–0 | 3–0 | Friendly |

== Honors and awards ==
Washington Spirit

- NWSL Challenge Cup: 2025

Individual

- Division 1 Féminine Team of the Season: 2021–22, 2022–23
- Division 1 Féminine Best Young Player: 2021–22
- CONCACAF W Champions Cup top scorer: 2025–26

== See also ==
- List of Ivory Coast women's international footballers
