= Mariam Mahmood =

English footballer (born 2004)

Personal information
- Date of birth: 11 May 2004 (age 22)
- Place of birth: England
- Position: Forward

Team information
- Current team: Wrexham AFC
- Number: 11

Senior career*
Years	Team	Apps	(Gls)
2021–2025	West Bromwich Albion		
2025–	Wrexham AFC	20	(10)

International career
2025–	Pakistan	6	(3)
- * Club domestic league appearances and goals

Mariam "Maz" Mahmood (born 11 May 2004) is a professional footballer who plays as a forward. Born in England, she plays for the Pakistan women's national football team. Sky Sports highlights her as a key figure in "British South Asians in Football", celebrating her top-scorer achievements at West Bromwich Albion.

== Club career ==
Mahmood came through the West Bromwich Albion youth programme and was promoted to the senior squad in 2021. She scored in seven consecutive matches in mid‑2022, helping raise her profile among supporters and scouts.

On 29 March 2026, Mariam Mahmood became the first Pakistani female footballer to win a European top-tier league title. On the same day, her club, Wrexham, claimed the Adran Premier title for the first time in its history, securing qualification for the 2026–27 UEFA Women's Champions League.

== International career ==
In June 2025, Mahmood received her first call‑up to the Pakistan women's national squad as part of a contingent of six diaspora players preparing for the 2026 AFC Women's Asian Cup qualification rounds in Jakarta. Her selection follows discussions in late 2024 about her availability to choose between England and Pakistan at senior level. In July 2025, She scored 2 goals against Kyrgyzstan.

== Career statistics ==
=== Club ===
Season	Club	Apps	Goals
2023–24	West Bromwich Albion	–	7
2025–	Wrexham AFC	20	10

=== International ===
Season	Club	Apps	Goals
2025–26	Pakistan	6	3

No.	Date	Venue	Opponent	Score	Result	Competition
1.	5 July 2025	Indomilk Arena, Tangerang, Indonesia	Kyrgyzstan	1–0	2–1	2026 AFC Women's Asian Cup qualification
2.	5 July 2025	Indomilk Arena, Tangerang, Indonesia	Kyrgyzstan	2–0	2–1	2026 AFC Women's Asian Cup qualification
3.	9 April 2026	Alassane Ouattara Stadium, Abidjan, Ivory Coast	Turks and Caicos	4–0	8–0	2026 FIFA Series

== Honours ==
Individual

- Asian Football Awards Women’s Player Award : 2026
