= Fatou Diop =

Mauritanian footballer

Fatou Dioup
Personal information
- Date of birth: 5 May 1994 (age 32)
- Place of birth: Nouakchott, Mauritania
- Position: Midfielder

Team information
- Current team: Union Touarga
- Number: 10

Senior career*
Years	Team	Apps	(Gls)
2020–2024	AUSF Assa-Zag		

International career^{‡}
2019–	Mauritania		(1+)
- * Club domestic league appearances and goals ‡ National team caps and goals as of 31 October 2021

Fatou Dioup (Arabic: فاتو ديوب; born 5 May 1994) is a Mauritanian footballer who plays as a midfielder for Moroccan Division 1 Féminine club Union Touarga and the Mauritania national team.

== Club career ==
Dioup has played for Strasbourg Vauban, Saint-Denis and AUSF Assa-Zag in Morocco.

== International career ==
Dioup was capped for Mauritania at senior level during their first ever international match (friendly). She scored Mauritania's first-ever international goal.

== Career statistics ==
=== International ===
Scores and results list Mauritania's goal tally first

List of international goals scored by Lili Iskandar
No.	Date	Venue	Opponent	Score	Result	Competition	Ref.
1	30 July 2019	Stade Cheikha Ould Boïdiya, Nouakchott, Mauritania	Djibouti		1–3	Friendly	

== See also ==
- List of Mauritania women's international footballers
