= AMFF Laâyoune =

Women's football club in Laâyoune

- Founded: 2000
- Stadium: Moulay Rachid Stadium Sheikh Mohamed Laghdaf Stadium
- Capacity: 5,000
- President: Khadija Illa
- Coach: Driss Kamiss
- League: Moroccan Women's Championship
- 2024–25: D1, 5th of 14
Home colours	Away colours

Association Municipale Féminine du Football Laayoune (Arabic: الجمعية البلدية لكرة القدم النسوية العيون), shortly known as Club Municipale Laâyoune (Arabic: النادي البلدي العيون) or AMFFL, is a women's football club based in Laâyoune, Moroccan-occupied Western Sahara. It competes in the Moroccan Women's Championship, in the highest level of the Moroccan football league system.

== History ==
The club was established in 2000. In 2010, the club won its first championship in the 2009–10 season. They followed it up with titles in 2010–11 and 2011–12, becoming the first team in league history to win three championships in a row.

== Players and Staff ==
=== Players ===
As of January 8, 2025

Note: Flags indicate national team as defined under FIFA eligibility rules; some limited exceptions apply. Players may hold more than one non-FIFA nationality.

No.	Pos.	Nation	Player
9	FW	KEN	Violet Wanyonyi
10	MF	TOG	Adjovi Zoutepe
19	FW	MTN	Ramata Gangué
28	MF	BEN	Nadège Atanhloueto
33	MF	MAR	Hassania Alaidi
12	GK	MAR	Hanane Azyane
18	DF	MAR	Fatima Zahra Ouhssain
32	DF	MAR	Wafae Ahabchane
4	DF	MAR	Sanaa Bendaggane
30	MF	MAR	Mariame Ezzaaboute

No.	Pos.	Nation	Player
10	MF	MAR	Tekber Lebihi
11	FW	MAR	Amina El Mostaphi
13	FW	MAR	Amina El Bettach
22	GK	MAR	Chaima Ibnouloualid
25	FW	MAR	Hanane Aouzal
26	FW	MAR	Hajiba Ennadifi
60	DF	MAR	Fatima Zahra Amlal
61	DF	MAR	Widad Maizzou
46	MF	MAR	Douae Mansouri
29	DF	MAR	Rania Laribi
21	MF	MAR	Hibatallah Azegrouz

=== Staff ===
As of January 8, 2025

Coaching staff
Head coach	(Morocco) Driss Kamiss
Assistant coach	

== Honours ==
=== Domestic ===
- Moroccan Women's Championship :
  - Winners (4): 2009–10, 2010–11, 2011–12, 2014–15
  - Runners-up (5): 2015–16, 2016–17, 2017–18, 2019–20, 2021–22
- Moroccan Women Throne Cup :
  - Runners-up (5): 2011, 2012, 2015, 2016, 2023

== See also ==
- Moroccan Women's Championship
