= Layla Banaras =

Pakistani footballer (born 2006)

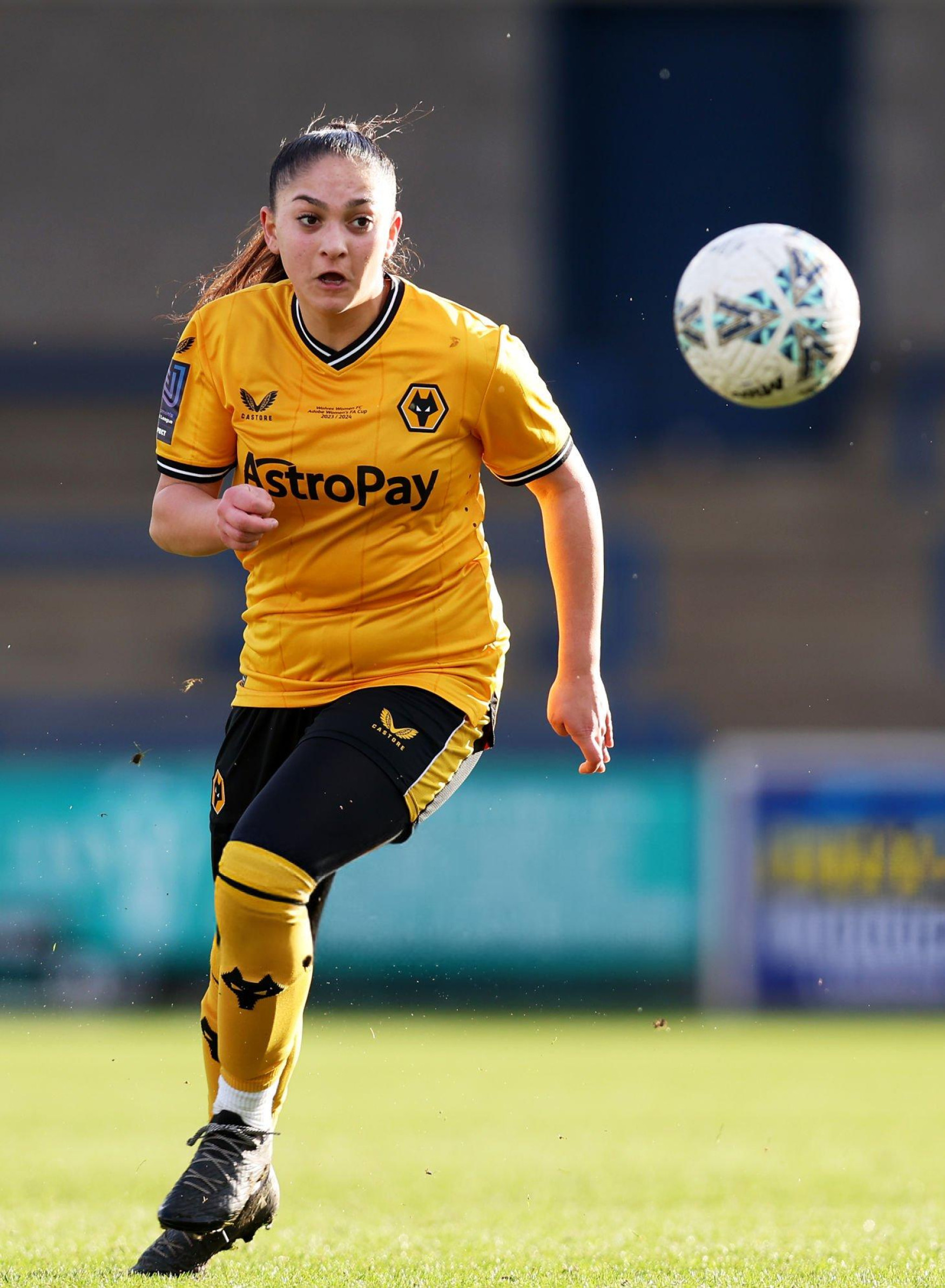
- Banaras playing for Wolves in 2024

Personal information
- Date of birth: 11 February 2006 (age 20)
- Place of birth: Birmingham, England
- Positions: Defender; midfielder

Team information
- Current team: Lewes
- Number: 5

Senior career*
Years	Team	Apps	(Gls)
2023–2025	Birmingham City		
2024–2025	→ Wolverhampton Wanderers (loan)		
2025–	Lewes	17	(1)

International career^{‡}
2025–	Pakistan	6	(2)
- * Club domestic league appearances and goals as of 13 October 2025 ‡ National team caps and goals as of 17 April 2026

Layla Banaras (born 11 February 2006) is a professional footballer who plays as a centre-back for FA Women's National League South club Lewes. Born in England, she plays for the Pakistan national team. She stands out as one of the few British South Asian women to reach the senior ranks of English football.

== Club career ==
Banaras made history in January 2023 as the first South Asian heritage woman to appear for Birmingham City in the professional era, debuting in a Women's FA Cup match against Huddersfield Town.

In February 2024, she joined Wolverhampton Wanderers on dual registration from Birmingham City.

In August 2025, she joined Lewes for the 2025/26 season.

== International career ==
Being of Pakistani descent, Banaras was invited to join Pakistan’s national team setup. She was named in the 21‑player squad for the 2026 AFC Women's Asian Cup qualification round held in Jakarta as a defender.

In Pakistan's second qualifier, where the team beat Indonesia 2–0, Banaras made her first tournament appearance and provided an assist for Nadia Khan’s goal. In her second appearance for Pakistan, during the team's third qualifier against Kyrgyzstan, Banaras provided an assist for Mariam Mehmood, who scored both goals in a 2–1 victory.

== Career statistics ==
=== Club ===
Season	Club	Apps	Goals
2023–25	Birmingham City	–	-
2024–25	Wolves	-	-
2025–26	Lewes	17	1

=== International ===
Season	Club	Apps	Goals
2025–26	Pakistan	6	2

=== International goals ===
No.	Date	Venue	Opponent	Score	Result	Competition
1.	9 April 2026	Alassane Ouattara Stadium, Abidjan, Ivory Coast	Turks and Caicos	3–0	8–0	2026 FIFA Series
2.	9 April 2026	Alassane Ouattara Stadium, Abidjan, Ivory Coast	Turks and Caicos	7–0	8–0	2026 FIFA Series

== Personal life ==
Layla Banaras is of Pakistani descent and a practicing Muslim. She was born in Birmingham to a Pakistani father and an English mother.

As a teenager, Banaras became aware of the lack of tailored guidance for Muslim athletes fasting during Ramadan. At just 15, she worked with Birmingham City’s nutritionist to develop a Ramadan-specific meal planner and hydration strategy designed to help players maintain performance during training and matches while fasting.

In 2025, she expanded this initiative into the "Ramadan Nutritional Guide and Planner", a comprehensive resource created in collaboration with industry experts to optimize nutrition, hydration, and recovery for Muslim athletes observing the fast.
