= Pakistan women's national football team =

Women's national football team representing Pakistan

Pakistan
- Association: Pakistan Football Federation
- Confederation: AFC (Asia)
- Sub-confederation: SAFF (South Asia)
- Head coach: Adeel Rizki
- Captain: Maria Khan
- Top scorer: Nadia Khan (6)
- FIFA code: PAK
First colours	Second colours

FIFA ranking
- Current: 154 (16 June 2026)
- Highest: 106 (December 2013)
- Lowest: 161 (March 2023)

First international
- India 6–0 Pakistan (Dhaka, Bangladesh; 31 January 2010)

Biggest win
- Pakistan 8–0 Turks & Caicos (Abidjan, Côte d'Ivoire; 9 April 2026)

Biggest defeat
- Nepal 12–0 Pakistan (Cox's Bazar, Bangladesh; 18 December 2010)

SAFF Championship
- Appearances: 5 (first in 2010)
- Best result: Semi-finals (2010)
Medal record
SAFF Championship
Bronze medal – third place	2010 Bangladesh	Team
- Website: pff.com.pk

The Pakistan women's national football team is the female representative in international women's football for Pakistan. The team was formed in 2010 and has not yet qualified for the AFC Women's Asian Cup or the FIFA Women's World Cup, but has competed in five editions of the biennial SAFF Women's Championship.

Its under-19 and under-16 teams have competed in the qualification rounds of the 2019 AFC U-19 Women's Championship and 2019 AFC U-16 Women's Championship, respectively.

== History ==
=== Beginnings (2010–2011) ===
The Pakistan women's national football team made its international debut at the 11th South Asian Games in Dhaka. Midfielder Ishrat Fatima of Lahore's Sports Sciences Department (Punjab University) was the first captain of the team. The team played their first match on 31 January 2010 against India at the Bangabandhu National Stadium. It also faced off against Bangladesh, Sri Lanka, and Nepal in that tournament, winning against Sri Lanka via walkover while losing the other two fixtures. It came in 4th out of 5 teams.

In November 2010, Tariq Lutfi was appointed as the coach of the team. In December 2010, the team, under Lutfi and the new captain, Sana Mehmood (Young Rising Star's captain and central defender), participated in the inaugural SAFF Women's Championship held at Cox's Bazar Stadium. It stood second Group B, winning against the Maldives (2–1) and Afghanistan (3–0), while losing heavily to Nepal (0–12). Pakistan lost 8–0 against India in the semifinal and were thus eliminated. In this tournament, Mehwish Khan became the first ever goal-scorer for Pakistan (in the match against Maldives).

As a result of these official matches, Pakistan entered the FIFA Women's World Rankings for the first time on 18 March 2011, placing 121st in the World and 22nd in Asia.

=== Further participations (2011–2014) ===
In May 2011, four members of the team (Abiha Haidar, Roshnan Ali, Sara Mumtaz and coach Ishrat Fatima) went to the United States for a two-week FIFA Women's World Cup Developing Program. They attended seminars, programs, meetings, and practice sessions in New York, New Jersey, Baltimore, and Washington, D.C., and visited various local colleges and universities. The group was also hosted for a special dinner at the White House by the US Government for boosting bilateral relations through sports promotion and development.

In September 2012, the team participated in the 2nd SAFF Women's Championship held in Colombo, Sri Lanka. Pakistan lost against Nepal (0–8) and Afghanistan (0–4) before earning a consolation win against the Maldives (3–0).

Pakistan played its first international friendly series against Bahrain in October 2014. Three matches were played at the Bahrain National Stadium in Riffa, with the home side winning all of them. These matches were organized to help prepare the team for the upcoming 3rd edition of the SAFF Women's Championship.

Pakistan hosted the 2014 SAFF Women's Championship in November 2014, with all matches being held at Jinnah Sports Stadium in Islamabad. The hosts lost against Sri Lanka (1–2) and Nepal (0–2), but won against Bhutan (4–1), scoring four goals in a match for the first time.

=== Hiatus (2014–2022) ===
From November 2014 to September 2022, the team saw no action due to the Pakistan Football Federation (PFF) being suspended several times by FIFA for infighting and third-party interference. The suspensions were removed occasionally, but not in time for Pakistan to participate in the 2016 and 2019 editions of the SAFF Women's Championship, and in the 2016 and 2019 editions of the South Asian Games. As a result of no matches being played, the team lost its FIFA ranking.

=== Return (2022–present) ===
On 30 June 2022, FIFA lifted PFF's suspension after a period of 14 months. As a result, PFF was able to send in Pakistan women's team's entry for the 2022 SAFF Women's Championship. The entry was confirmed on 9 July 2022, which meant that the team would be playing its first international match since 2014. A 35-member training camp was held at Lahore in August 2022 under new head coach Adeel Rizki, after which a 23-member squad was announced on 24 August 2022. Hajra Khan, Malika-e-Noor, Syeda Mahpara, Nisha Ashraf, Roshnan Ali, Sahar Zaman, and Zulfia Nazir were the only players who were part of the team that last played in 2014; the rest were given their first call-ups. Two overseas players, Nadia Khan and Maria Khan, were also included for the first time. The captaincy was handed over to Maria Khan from Hajra Khan, while Malika-e-Noor was named the vice-captain.

Pakistan made its return to international football on 7 September 2022, with 58th-ranked India being its first opponent in the group stage of the 2022 SAFF Women's Championship at the Dasharath Rangasala in Kathmandu. Pakistan lost 3–0, which was followed by a 6–0 loss against Nepal in the next match which meant the team could not progress to the semifinals. In the final group stage fixture, Pakistan recorded its biggest win when it defeated Maldives 7–0, courtesy of four goals by Nadia Khan, who became the team's joint record goal scorer. It was also the first time a player had scored three goals or more in a match for Pakistan.

In January 2023, the team visited Saudi Arabia for a four-nation international friendly tournament. It won its first game 1–0 against Comoros, the first time it faced a non-Asian opponent, lost the next fixture 2–1 against Mauritius, before drawing the final match 1–1 against hosts Saudi Arabia. With four points in three matches, Pakistan finished as runners-up at the tournament, with captain Maria Khan being declared as the player of the tournament.

In April 2023, Pakistan played its first competitive fixtures when it made its first appearance in the first round of the 2024 AFC Women's Olympic Qualifying Tournament. The team lost 4–0 against Philippines and 2–0 against Hong Kong, but won 1–0 against hosts Tajikistan.

The team was to visit Singapore in July for two friendly fixtures against the host team. However, their departure was delayed due to visa issues which meant only one match could be played. Singapore won that match 1–0.

In August, it was confirmed that Pakistan will participate in a six-team tournament to be held in Saudi Arabia in September. In that tournament, Pakistan drew 0–0 against Malaysia and lost 1–0 against Saudi Arabia in their first two matches. In their final group match, they won 4–2 on penalties against Laos after the match ended 1–1. This was the first penalty shootout win for Pakistan.

In 2024, the team competed in the SAFF Women's Championship held in Nepal. It lost 5–2 against India, and drew 1–1 against eventual champions Bangladesh. Pakistan also played against Saudi Arabia in a 1–1 draw in friendly match in December of that year.

In 2025, Pakistan competed in its first AFC Women's Asian Cup qualification campaign. As part of Group D, Pakistan played all three of its matches in Indonesia. After an 8–0 loss against Chinese Taipei in their first match, Pakistan won its next two matches 2–0 and 2–1 against Indonesia and Kyrgyzstan respectively.

== Results and fixtures ==
- The following is a list of match results in the last 12 months, as well as any future matches that have been scheduled.

Legend

Win Draw Lose Fixture

=== 2026 ===
9 April 2026 FIFA Series	Pakistan	8–0	Turks and Caicos	Abidjan, Ivory Coast
16:00 GMT	Malik 10'; Mushtaq 12', 77'; Banaras 31', 79'; Mahmood 38'; N. Khan 57'; I. Khan 81'	Report (FIFA)		Stadium: Alassane Ouattara Stadium; Referee: Natacha Konan (Ivory Coast)

12 April 2026 FIFA Series	Mauritania	1–0	Pakistan	Abidjan, Ivory Coast
16:00 GMT	Gengui 20'	Report (FIFA)		Stadium: Alassane Ouattara Stadium; Referee: Odilone Ehui (Ivory Coast)

16 April 2026 FIFA Series	Ivory Coast	2–0	Pakistan	Abidjan, Ivory Coast
19:30 GMT	Diallo 40'; Ouédraogo 69'	Report (FIFA)		Stadium: Alassane Ouattara Stadium; Referee: Jacqueline Nikiéma (Burkina Faso)

== Coaching staff ==
=== Current coaching staff ===
As of February 2026

Position	Name
Head Coach	(Pakistan) Adeel Rizki
Assistant coaches	(Iran) Mahnaz Sadeghi
Assistant coaches	(Iran) Solmaz Azimian
Goalkeeping Coach	(Pakistan) Ahsanullah Khan
Fitness Coach	(Pakistan) Mahmood Ali Shah
Physiotherapist	(Pakistan) Aqsa Naveed
Team Manager	(Pakistan) Amul Khan Niazi

== Coaching history ==
As of 17 April 2026, after the match against Ivory Coast.

Name	Period	Matches	Wins	Draws	Losses	Ref.
(Pakistan) Tariq Lutfi	2010–2014	13	4	0	9	
(Pakistan) Adeel Rizki	2022–present	22	6	5	11	

== Players ==
=== Current squad ===
The following 22 players were called up for the 2026 AFC Women's Asian Cup qualifiers in June 2025.

Caps and goals partially updated for some players 13 April 2026 following the match against Mauritania.

No.	Pos.	Player	Date of birth (age)	Caps	Goals	Club
1	GK	Nisha Ashraf	4 April 1998 (age 28)	12	0	(Pakistan Football Federation) Karachi City
16	GK	Zeeyana Jivraj	26 January 2000 (age 26)	5	0	(Afghanistan Football Federation) Hazargi Atalan Kabul SC
23	GK	Jennah Farooki		1	0	(United States Soccer Federation) Ohio Dominican Panthers
5	DF	Layla Banaras	11 February 2006 (age 20)	5	2	(The Football Association) Lewes
6	MF	Maria Khan (Captain)	28 November 1990 (age 35)	16	2	(Football Association of Malaysia) Kelena United
13	DF	Nizalia Siddiqui	25 June 2002 (age 24)	15	0	(Pakistan Football Federation) Legacy
15	DF	Sophiya Qureshi	2 August 2007 (age 19)	3	0	(Pakistan Football Federation) Karachi City
17	DF	Aliya Sadiq	9 October 1998 (age 28)	5	0	(Pakistan Football Federation) Karachi City
4	MF	Marsha Malik		1	0	(Pakistan Football Federation) Karachi United
9	MF	Suha Hirani	28 November 1998 (age 27)	21	3	(Bhutan Football Federation) Transport United
10	MF	Rameen Fareed	25 June 2002 (age 24)	20	1	(Pakistan Football Federation) Karachi City
14	MF	Amina Hanif	28 November 2002 (age 23)	7	0	(The Football Association) Dartford
18	MF	Sanah Mehdi		6	0	(The Football Association) Chorley
20	MF	Azwa Chaudhry		3	0	(The Football Association) Actonians
21	MF	Zahmena Malik	21 December 2001 (age 24)	18	3	(The Football Association) Actonians
22	MF	Isra Khan	29 March 1999 (age 27)	12	1	(United States Soccer Federation) Dickinson Red Devils
7	FW	Nadia Khan	27 February 2001 (age 25)	11	6	(The Football Association) Sheffield FC
8	FW	Aqsa Mushtaq	20 August 1998 (age 28)	5	2	(Hellenic Football Federation) Odysseas Moschatou
11	FW	Mariam Mahmood	11 May 2004 (age 22)	5	3	(Football Association of Wales) Wrexham AFC
12	FW	Zulfia Shah	30 May 1999 (age 27)	1	0	(Pakistan Football Federation) Karachi United
19	FW	Anmol Hira	28 November 1995 (age 30)	17	2	(Pakistan Football Federation) TWK Lahore

=== Recent call-ups ===
- The following players have been called up to Pakistan within the last 12 months.

Pos.	Player	Date of birth (age)	Caps	Goals	Club	Latest call-up

== Player records ==
=== Top goalscorers ===
As of 10 April 2026

Rank	Player	Goals	Period
1	Nadia Khan	6	2022–present
2	Hajra Khan	5	2010–2022
3	Malika-e-Noor	4	2010–2024
4	Suha Hirani	3	2022–present
4	Zahmena Malik	3	2023–present
4	Mariam Mahmood	3	2025–present
5	Shahlyla Baloch	2	2010–2016
5	Anmol Hira	2	2022–present
5	Maria Khan	2	2022–present
5	Aqsa Mushtaq	2	2025–present
5	Layla Banaras	2	2025–present

== Competitive record ==
=== FIFA Women's World Cup ===
FIFA Women's World Cup record									Qualification record						
Year	Result	GP	W	D	L	GS	GA	GD	GP	W	D	L	GS	GA	GD
(China) 1991 to (Germany) 2011	Did not exist								Did not exist						
(Canada) 2015 to (Australia) (New Zealand) 2023	Did not enter								Did not enter						
(Brazil) 2027	Did not qualify								Via AFC Women's Asian Cup						
(Costa Rica) (Jamaica) (Mexico) (United States) 2031	To be determined								To be determined						
(United Kingdom) 2035	To be determined								To be determined						
Total	0/10	–	–	–	–	–	–	–	–	–	–	–	–	–	–

=== Olympic Games ===
Summer Olympics record									Qualification record						
Year	Round	Pld	W	D*	L	GF	GA	GD	Pld	W	D*	L	GF	GA	GD
(United States) 1996 to (China) 2008	Did not exist								Did not exist						
(United Kingdom) 2012 to (Japan) 2020	Did not enter								Did not enter						
(France) 2024	Did not qualify								3	1	0	2	1	6	−5
(United States) 2028	Did not qualify								Via AFC Women's Asian Cup						
(Australia) 2032	To be determined								To be determined						
Total	0/9	–	–	–	–	–	–	–	3	1	0	2	1	6	−5

*Denotes draws includes knockout matches decided on penalty kicks.

=== AFC Women's Asian Cup ===
AFC Women's Asian Cup record									Qualification record						
Year	Result	GP	W	D*	L	GS	GA	GD	GP	W	D*	L	GS	GA	GD
(Hong Kong) 1975 to (China) 2010	Did not exist								Did not exist						
(Vietnam) 2014 to (India) 2022	Did not enter								Did not enter						
(Australia) 2026	Did not qualify								3	2	0	1	4	9	−5
(Uzbekistan) 2029	To be determined								To be determined						
Total	0/21	–	–	–	–	–	–	–	3	2	0	1	4	9	−5

*Denotes draws includes knockout matches decided on penalty kicks.

=== SAFF Women's Championship ===
SAFF Championship record
Year	Result	Pos	P	W	D*	L	GF	GA
(Bangladesh) 2010	Semi-finals	4th	4	2	0	2	5	21
(Sri Lanka) 2012	Group stage	6th	3	1	0	2	3	12
(Pakistan) 2014	Group stage	5th	3	1	0	2	5	5
(India) 2016	Did not enter							
(Nepal) 2019	Did not enter							
(Nepal) 2022	Group stage	5th	3	1	0	2	7	9
(Nepal) 2024	Group stage	5th	2	0	1	1	3	6
(India) 2026	Did not enter							
Total: 5/8	Semi-finals		15	5	1	9	23	53

*Draws include knockout matches decided on penalty kicks.

=== South Asian Games ===
South Asian Games record
Year	Result	Pos	P	W	D*	L	GF	GA
(Bangladesh) 2010	Round-robin	4th	4	1	0	3	3	14
(India) 2016	Did not enter							
(Nepal) 2019	Did not enter							
(Pakistan) 2027	To be determined							
Total: 1/3	Fourth place		4	1	0	3	3	14

*Denotes draws includes knockout matches decided on penalty kicks.

== Head-to-head record ==
Key

Positive balance (more wins than losses)
Neutral balance (as many wins as losses)
Negative balance (more losses than wins)

The following table shows Pakistan's all-time official international record per opponent:

Opponent	P	W	D	L	GF	GA	W%	D%	L%	Confederation	First meeting
(Afghanistan) Afghanistan	2	1	0	1	3	4	50	0	50	AFC	16 December 2010
(Bangladesh) Bangladesh	3	0	1	2	1	8	0	0	100	AFC	2 February 2010
(Bahrain) Bahrain	3	0	0	3	2	20	0	0	100	AFC	23 October 2014
(Bhutan) Bhutan	1	1	0	0	4	1	100	0	0	AFC	16 November 2014
(Chinese Taipei) Chinese Taipei	1	0	0	1	0	8	0	0	100	AFC	29 June 2025
(Comoros) Comoros	1	1	0	0	1	0	100	0	0	CAF	11 January 2023
(Hong Kong) Hong Kong	1	0	0	1	0	2	0	0	100	AFC	8 April 2023
(India) India	4	0	0	4	2	22	0	0	100	AFC	31 January 2010
(Indonesia) Indonesia	1	1	0	0	2	0	100	0	0	AFC	2 July 2025
(Ivory Coast) Ivory Coast	1	0	0	1	0	2	0	0	100	CAF	16 April 2026
(Kyrgyzstan) Kyrgyzstan	1	1	0	0	2	1	100	0	0	AFC	5 July 2025
(Laos) Laos	1	0	1	0	1	1	0	100	0	AFC	28 September 2023
(Malaysia) Malaysia	1	0	1	0	0	0	0	100	0	AFC	21 September 2023
(Maldives) Maldives	3	3	0	0	12	1	100	0	0	AFC	14 December 2010
(Mauritania) Mauritania	1	0	0	1	0	1	0	0	100	CAF	12 April 2026
(Mauritius) Mauritius	1	0	0	1	1	2	0	0	100	CAF	15 January 2023
(Nepal) Nepal	4	0	0	4	0	29	0	0	100	AFC	18 December 2010
(Philippines) Philippines	1	0	0	1	0	4	0	0	100	AFC	5 April 2023
(Saudi Arabia) Saudi Arabia	3	0	2	1	2	3	0	50	50	AFC	19 January 2023
(Singapore) Singapore	1	0	0	1	0	1	0	0	100	AFC	18 July 2023
(Sri Lanka) Sri Lanka	2	1	0	1	4	2	50	0	50	AFC	11 November 2014
(Tajikistan) Tajikistan	1	1	0	0	1	0	100	0	0	AFC	11 April 2023
(Turks and Caicos Islands) Turks and Caicos	1	1	0	0	8	0	100	0	0	CONCACAF	9 April 2026
Total	39	11	5	23	46	112					

Last updated: Ivory Coast vs Pakistan, 16 April 2026.

== See also ==
- Football in Pakistan
  - Women's football in Pakistan
- Pakistan women's national under-17 football team
- Pakistan women's national under-20 football team
- Pakistan national football team
