= Aqsa Mushtaq =

Professional footballer (born 1998)

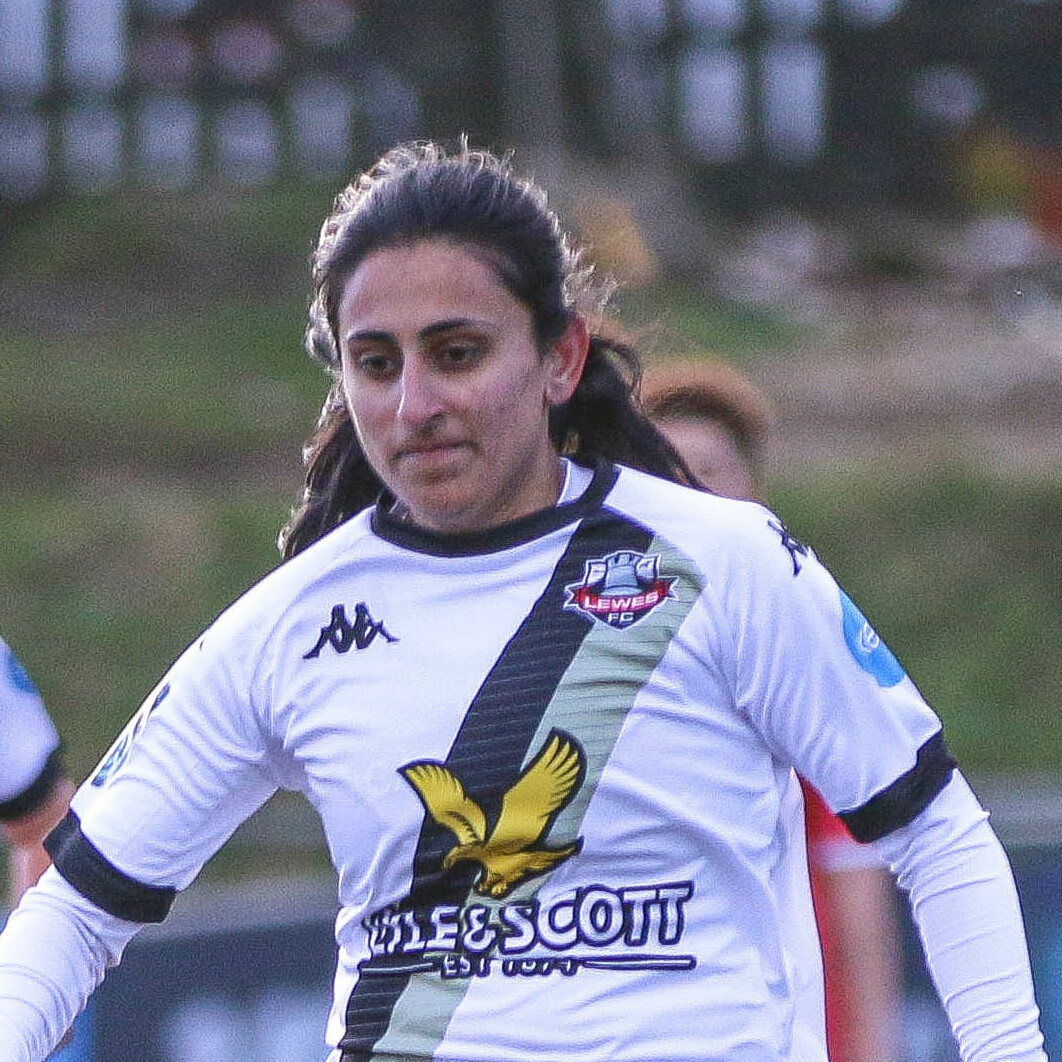
- Mushtag in 2023

Personal information
- Date of birth: 15 August 1998 (age 28)
- Place of birth: Bradford, England
- Positions: Midfielder; winger

Team information
- Current team: Odysseas Moschatou W.F.C.

Youth career
- Bradford

College career
| Years | Team | Apps | (Gls) |
| 2016–2020 | Lenoir–Rhyne University | 72 | (24) |

Senior career*
| Years | Team | Apps | (Gls) |
| 2020–2021 | Napoli | 0 | (0) |
| 2020–2021 | → Roma (loan) | | |
| 2021–2022 | Avantes Chalkidas | | |
| 2022–2023 | Ergotelis | | |
| 2023 | Lewes | 7 | (0) |
| 2023–2025 | OFI | 42 | (13) |
| 2025 | Ünye | 6 | (2) |
| 2025–2026 | Warbeyen | 10 | (1) |
| 2026– | Odysseas Moschatou | | |

International career^{‡}
| 2025– | Pakistan | 4 | (2) |
- * Club domestic league appearances and goals as of 20 August 2026 ‡ National team caps and goals as of 9 April 2026

Aqsa Mushtaq (born 15 August 1998) is a professional footballer who plays as a midfielder or winger for Odysseas Moschatou in the Greek A Division. Born in England, she plays for the Pakistan women's national football team.

== Early life & education ==
Born and raised in Bradford, England to a Pakistani family, Mushtaq joined Bradford City’s youth academy. She later moved to the U.S. to attend Lenoir–Rhyne University (2017–2020), where she scored 13 goals in 17 games and was named South Atlantic Conference Player of the Year 2019–20.

== Club career ==
In August 2020, Mushtaq became the first player of Pakistani descent to sign a professional contract in Italy, joining SSD Napoli Femminile.

She later transferred to the Greek club Avantes Chalkidas, where she earned league MVP honors. In July 2024, she signed with OFI Crete, scoring ten goals and registering eight assists in her first season.

In September 2025, she moved to Turkey, and joined the Turkish Super League club Ünye.

== International career ==
In June 2025, Mushtaq was named in the Pakistan squad for the 2026 AFC Women's Asian Cup qualification, as part of the national team’s strategic inclusion of overseas talent.

== Style of play ==
Mushtaq is a left-footed winger known for her technical dribbling, vision, and passing. In a 2023 interview, she described her game as “quick, technical and composed,” and named Steven Gerrard as her inspiration.

== Personal life ==
Mushtaq supports Liverpool F.C. and admires former captain Steven Gerrard. She has visited Pakistan multiple times and remains closely connected to her heritage.

Mushtaq is featured in the British South Asians in Football timeline compiled by Sky Sports, marking her contributions to the sport and her historic signing in Italy.

== Career statistics ==
| No. | Date | Venue | Opponent | Score | Result | Competition |
|---|---|---|---|---|---|---|
| 1. | 9 April 2026 | Alassane Ouattara Stadium, Abidjan, Ivory Coast | Turks and Caicos | 2–0 | 8–0 | 2026 FIFA Series |
| 2. | 9 April 2026 | Alassane Ouattara Stadium, Abidjan, Ivory Coast | Turks and Caicos | 6–0 | 8–0 | 2026 FIFA Series |
