= Legacy WFC =

Pakistani football club

Legacy
- Full name: Legacy Women Football Club
- Short name: LEG
- Founded: 2023; 3 years ago
- Chairman: Faizan Sameer
- Manager: Walid Javaid
- League: National Women Football Championship
- 2024: Runners-up

Legacy Women's Football Club is a Pakistani professional women's association football club based in Islamabad. The club is affiliated with Football Factory, a youth development academy.

The club made its debut at the 2024 National Women Football Championship, finishing as runners-up.

== History ==
The club made its debut at the 2024 National Women Football Championship, finishing as runners up after falling against Karachi City in the final. The team included several notable international players such as Malika-e-Noor, and several overseas players including Kayanat Bokhari. Legacy player Eman Mustafa was declared top scorer of the tournament.

== Honours ==
Cup

- National Women Football Championship
  - Runners-up (1): 2024
