= Turks and Caicos Islands women's national football team =

Turks and Caicos Islands
- Association: Turks and Caicos Islands; Football Association
- Confederation: CONCACAF
- Head coach: Yunelsis Rodríguez
- FIFA code: TCA
First colours	Second colours

FIFA ranking
- Current: 196 ▼1 (16 June 2026)
- Highest: 167 (August 2021)
- Lowest: 196 (December 2025)

First international
- Bermuda 4–0 Turks and Caicos Islands (Dominican Republic; 4 May 2006)

Biggest defeat
- Nicaragua 19–0 Turks and Caicos Islands (Managua, Nicaragua; 22 February 2022)

The Turks and Caicos Islands women's national football team is the national women's football team of Turks and Caicos Islands and is overseen by the Turks and Caicos Islands Football Association.

== Results and fixtures ==
The following is a list of match results in the last 12 months, as well as any future matches that have been scheduled.

=== 2026 ===
9 April 2026 FIFA Series	Pakistan	8–0	Turks and Caicos	Abidjan, Ivory Coast
16:00	Malik 10'; Mushtaq 12', 77'; Banaras 31', 79'; Mahmood 38'; N. Khan 57'; I. Khan 81'	Report (FIFA)		Stadium: Alassane Ouattara Stadium; Referee: Natacha Konan (Ivory Coast)

12 April 2026 FIFA Series	Turks and Caicos	1–15	Ivory Coast	Abidjan, Ivory Coast
19:30	Moline 28'	Report (FIFA)	Diallo 6', 10', 23', 42'; Kreto 12' (pen.), 22', 27', 52'; Kouassi 32'; Kokora 45'; N'Guessan 45+3' (pen.); Konan 47', 77', 83'; Abrogoua 90+2'	Stadium: Alassane Ouattara Stadium; Referee: Edoh Kindedji (Togo)

16 April 2026 FIFA Series	Turks and Caicos	0–6	Mauritania	Abidjan, Ivory Coast
16:00		Report (FIFA)	Diabira 17', 33' (pen.), 68'; Bilal 26', 58'; Fall 75'	Stadium: Alassane Ouattara Stadium; Referee: Natacha Konan (Ivory Coast)

Legend

Win Draw Lose Fixture

== Players ==
=== Current squad ===
The following players were called up for the FIFA Serie Côte d'Ivoire 2026 matches on April 9, 12 and 16, 2026.

No.	Pos.	Player	Date of birth (age)	Club
1	GK	Achenie Desir	October 19, 2009 (age 16)	
2		Briangely Meises		
3		Winzaria Lefrance		
4		Shekinah Smith	June 10, 2010 (age 16)	
5		Jodee Harvey	February 7, 2008 (age 18)	
6		Wandelis Medina-Marte		
7		Keimari Simons		
8		Krysaan Williams (Captain)	December 14, 2008 (age 17)	
9		Edna Jeanty		
10		Asia Williams		
11		Irener Moline		
12		Deangela Malcolm	September 17, 2010 (age 15)	
13	GK	Marcela Fenelus		
14		Syniah Forbes-Chambers	May 31, 2007 (age 19)	
15		Carleah Lewis	January 18, 2007 (age 19)	
16		Alice French	October 6, 2010 (age 15)	
17		Azarie Brooks	November 10, 2008 (age 17)	
18	GK	Jamai Robinson		
19		Kayley Hall	July 29, 2008 (age 18)	(United States Soccer Federation) USC Union
20		Mikayla Marcellus		
21		Vanessa Joseph		
23		Callie Hall	July 29, 2008 (age 18)	(United States Soccer Federation) USC Union

== Competitive record ==
=== FIFA Women's World Cup ===
FIFA Women's World Cup record
Year	Result	GP	W	D*	L	GF	GA	GD
(China) 1991	Did not enter							
(Sweden) 1995	Did not enter							
(United States) 1999	Did not enter							
(United States) 2003	Did not enter							
(China) 2007	Did not qualify							
(Germany) 2011	Did not qualify							
(Canada) 2015	Did not qualify							
(France) 2019	Did not qualify							
(Australia) (New Zealand) 2023	Did not qualify							
(Brazil) 2027	Withdrew							
Total	0/10	-	-	-	-	-	-	-

*Draws include knockout matches decided on penalty kicks.

=== CONCACAF W Championship ===
CONCACAF W Championship record								Qualification record					
Year	Result	GP	W	D*	L	GF	GA	GP	W	D*	L	GF	GA
(Haiti) 1991	Did not enter												
(United States) 1993	Did not enter												
(Canada) 1994	Did not enter												
(Canada) 1998	Did not enter												
(United States) 2000	Did not enter												
(United States) (Canada) 2002	Did not enter												
(United States) 2006	Did not qualify							3	0	0	3	0	11
(Mexico) 2010	Did not qualify							2	0	0	2	1	8
(United States) 2014	Did not qualify							2014 Caribbean Cup					
(United States) 2018	Withdrew							Withdrew					
(Mexico) 2022	Did not qualify							4	0	0	4	1	47
(United States) 2026	Withdrew							Withdrew					
Total	0/12	-	-	-	-	-	-	9	0	0	9	2	66

*Draws include knockout matches decided on penalty kicks.

=== CONCACAF W Gold Cup ===
CONCACAF W Gold Cup record								Qualification record							
Year	Result	GP	W	D*	L	GF	GA	Division	Group	GP	W	D*	L	GF	GA
(United States) 2024	Did not qualify							C	A	6	0	1	5	0	24
(N/A) 2029	To be determined							To be determined							
Total	–	–	–	–	–	–	–	–	–	6	0	1	5	0	24

*Draws include knockout matches decided on penalty kicks.

=== CFU Women's Caribbean Cup ===
CFU Women's Caribbean Cup record
Year	Result	Pld	W	D*	L	GF	GA
(Haiti) 2000	Did not enter						
(Trinidad and Tobago) 2014	First round	3	0	0	3	0	12
(Jamaica) 2018	Withdrew						
Total	–	3	0	0	3	0	12

*Draws include knockout matches decided on penalty kicks.

== Coaches ==
- (England) Darren Meehan (2015–2016)
- (Cuba) Yunelsis Rodríguez (2018–)
