= Sport in Mauritania =

The most popular sport in Mauritania is football, which is run by the Football Federation of the Islamic Republic of Mauritania. The association administers the Mauritanian national football team, as well as the Mauritanian Premier League. Mauritania has an international football team who play and train at the Olympic Stadium. They qualified for their first Africa Cup of Nations in 2019.

Mauritania's premier national tournament is the Coupe du President de la Republique (President's Cup). The nation's best-known and most successful team is ASC Garde Nationale of the Mauritanian Premier League.

Mauritania has a competitive basketball team. However, they have been inactive since the 1980s. Their last participation was in the FIBA Africa Championship 1985, where they got 6th place.

Mauritania has a national rugby union team. Rugby union is a small sport in the country, but it has become more popular. The team has never appeared in the World Cup, but has played friendlies against neighboring countries.
