= Nadia Khan (footballer) =

Pakistani footballer (born 2001)

Personal information
- Date of birth: 27 February 2001 (age 25)
- Place of birth: Leeds, England
- Height: 1.52 m (5 ft 0 in)
- Position: Forward

Team information
- Current team: Sheffield FC Ladies
- Number: 27

Youth career
- Wortley FC
- 2016–2017: Leeds United RTC
- 2017–2018: Doncaster Rovers Belles

Senior career*
Years	Team	Apps	(Gls)
2018–2025	Doncaster Rovers Belles		
2024	→ Karachi City (loan)	5	(6)
2025–2026	Blackburn Rovers Women		
2026–	Sheffield FC Ladies		

International career^{‡}
2022–	Pakistan	7	(5)
- * Club domestic league appearances and goals as of 18:42, 31 August 2025 (UTC) ‡ National team caps and goals as of 16:48, 2 July 2025 (UTC)

Nadia Khan (Urdu: نادیہ خان; born 27 February 2001) is a footballer who plays as a forward for Blackburn Rovers Women and the Pakistan national team. Born in England, she represents Pakistan at international level. Khan is one of the first British-Pakistani women to play international football for the Pakistan national team.

== Club career ==
Khan began her football career at the Leeds United regional talent centre. Khan first wore a Doncaster Rovers Belles shirt in 2017 when she joined the club's development side. In 2018, she joined her teammates in moving to the first-team to compete in the FA Women's National League Northern Premier Division.

In October 2022, Khan made her 75th first-team appearance for the Belles. She was the club's longest-serving player. She sustained an anterior cruciate ligament injury in January 2023, while training with her national team.

In July 2024 Khan signed for Karachi City. She helped the team win the 2024 National Women Football Championship and was named Player of the Tournament. She rejoined the Belles ahead of a 3–1 defeat by Stockport County in September 2024.

== International career ==
Khan made her international debut for the Pakistan national team on 7 September 2022, against India at the 2022 SAFF Women's Championship in their 3–0 defeat. Khan scored four goals in Pakistan's 7–0 win over the Maldives at the tournament. She scored in the 53rd, 78th and 84th minutes to complete her hat-trick and then again netted the ball in the 89th minute to score her fourth goal. The four-goal haul made her the Pakistan national team's joint-all-time top goalscorer.

She was also included in the Pakistan squad for the 2023 SAFF Women's International Friendly Tournament at Khobar, Saudi Arabia. Following a period of injury Khan returned to the national team for the 2024 SAFF Women's Championship. She played in both Pakistan's matches: a 5–2 defeat by India and a 1–1 draw with eventual champions Bangladesh. She scored in Pakistan's 2-0 win over Indonesia in the 2026 AFC Women's Asian Cup qualification match.

== Career statistics ==
=== International ===
As of match played 20 October 2024

Appearances and goals by national team and year
National team	Year	Apps	Goals
Pakistan	2022	3	4
Pakistan	2023	0	0
Pakistan	2024	2	0
Pakistan	2025	2	1
Total		7	5

Scores and results list Pakistan's goal tally first, score column indicates score after each Khan goal.

List of international goals scored by Nadia Khan
No.	Date	Venue	Opponent	Score	Result	Competition
1	13 September 2022	Dasarath Rangasala, Kathmandu, Nepal	Maldives	3–0	7–0	2022 SAFF Women's Championship
2	13 September 2022	Dasarath Rangasala, Kathmandu, Nepal	Maldives	4–0	7–0	2022 SAFF Women's Championship
3	13 September 2022	Dasarath Rangasala, Kathmandu, Nepal	Maldives	5–0	7–0	2022 SAFF Women's Championship
4	13 September 2022	Dasarath Rangasala, Kathmandu, Nepal	Maldives	6–0	7–0	2022 SAFF Women's Championship
5	2 July 2025	Indomilk Arena, Tangerang, Indonesia	Indonesia	1–0	2–0	2026 AFC Women's Asian Cup qualification
6	9 April 2026	Alassane Ouattara Stadium, Abidjan, Ivory Coast	Turks and Caicos	5–0	8–0	2026 FIFA Series
