= 2026 FIFA Series (women's matches) =

Tournament details
- Host countries: Brazil; Ivory Coast; Kenya; Thailand
- Dates: 9–18 April
- Teams: 16 (from 5 confederations)
- Venues: 4 (in 4 host cities)

Final positions
- Champions: Australia; Brazil; Ivory Coast; Thailand

Tournament statistics
- Matches played: 20
- Goals scored: 99 (4.95 per match)
- Top scorer(s): (Ivory Coast) Priscille Kreto (7 goals)

The 2026 FIFA Series was the inaugural edition of women's national football teams FIFA Series, an invitational tournament promoted by FIFA that features friendly matches between teams from different continental confederations. The 2026 edition featured four different four-team series taking place across four host countries during the FIFA window of 9–18 April.

== Participating teams ==
The following teams are scheduled to participate in the 2026 event.

Series	Team	Confederation	FIFA Rankings December 2025
Brazil	Brazil	CONMEBOL	6
Brazil	Canada	CONCACAF	10
Brazil	South Korea	AFC	21
Brazil	Zambia	CAF	64
Ivory Coast	Ivory Coast	CAF	72
Ivory Coast	Mauritania	CAF	NR
Ivory Coast	Pakistan	AFC	154
Ivory Coast	Turks and Caicos	CONCACAF	196
Thailand	Thailand	AFC	52
Thailand	Indonesia (Note: Indonesia replaces Nepal in FIFA Women's Series)	AFC	106
Thailand	New Caledonia	OFC	101
Thailand	DR Congo	CAF	107
Kenya	Australia	AFC	15
Kenya	India	AFC	67
Kenya	Kenya	CAF	133
Kenya	Malawi	CAF	153

=== By confederation ===
Confederation	Number of teams
AFC	6
CAF	6
CONCACAF	2
CONMEBOL	1
OFC	1
UEFA	0

== Venues ==
Location of the 2026 Women's FIFA Series venues

Country	City	Stadium	Capacity
Brazil	Cuiabá	Arena Pantanal	42,788
Ivory Coast	Abidjan	Alassane Ouattara Stadium	60,012
Kenya	Nairobi	Nyayo National Stadium	18,000
Thailand	Ratchaburi	Ratchaburi Stadium	13,000

== Series ==
All times are local. Each team's confederation is indicated in brackets.

=== Brazil ===
The FIFA Series Brazil took place in Cuiabá between 11 and 18 April 2026. It involved the hosts Brazil (CONMEBOL), Canada (CONCACAF), South Korea (AFC) and Zambia (CAF).

Pos	Team	Pld	W	D	L	GF	GA	GD	Pts
1	Brazil (H, C)	3	3	0	0	12	2	+10	9
2	Canada	3	2	0	1	7	2	+5	6
3	South Korea	3	0	1	2	3	9	−6	1
4	Zambia	3	0	1	2	2	11	−9	1

(C) Champions; (H) Hosts
11 April 2026
15:00 UTC−4

Canada	4–0	Zambia
Prince 41', 45+2'; Chukwu 80', 88'	Report (FIFA)

Arena Pantanal, Cuiabá
Referee: Emikar Calderas (Venezuela)
11 April 2026
21:30 UTC−4

Brazil	5–1	South Korea
Ary Borges 42'; Ludmila 47'; Dudinha 58'; Kerolin 61'; Taina 83'	Report (FIFA)	Park Soo-jeong 87'

Arena Pantanal, Cuiabá
Referee: Laura Fortunato (Argentina)

14 April 2026
15:00 UTC−4

Canada	3–1	South Korea
Viens 23'; Gilles 50', 70'	Report (FIFA)	Kim Shin-ji 29'

Arena Pantanal, Cuiabá
Referee: Charly Deretti (Brazil)
14 April 2026
21:30 UTC−4

Brazil	6–1	Zambia
Yasmim 30'; Taina 47'; Angelina 60' (pen.); Raíssa 77'; Kerolin 90+1'; Vitória 90+6' (pen.)	Report (FIFA)	B. Banda 51'

Arena Pantanal, Cuiabá
Referee: Emikar Calderas (Venezuela)

18 April 2026
15:00 UTC−4

South Korea	1–1	Zambia
Phair 45+3'	Report (FIFA)	B. Banda 26' (pen.)

Arena Pantanal, Cuiabá
Referee: Edina Alves Batista (Brazil)
18 April 2026
21:30 UTC−4

Brazil	1–0	Canada
Aline 47'	Report (FIFA)

Arena Pantanal, Cuiabá
Referee: María Victoria Daza (Colombia)

=== Ivory Coast ===
The FIFA Series Ivory Coast took place in Abidjan in April 2026. It involved the hosts Ivory Coast (CAF), Mauritania (CAF), Pakistan (AFC) and Turks and Caicos (CONCACAF).

Pos	Team	Pld	W	D	L	GF	GA	GD	Pts
1	Ivory Coast (H, C)	3	3	0	0	25	1	+24	9
2	Mauritania	3	2	0	1	7	8	−1	6
3	Pakistan	3	1	0	2	8	3	+5	3
4	Turks and Caicos	3	0	0	3	1	29	−28	0

(C) Champions; (H) Hosts
9 April 2026
16:00 UTC+0

Pakistan	8–0	Turks and Caicos
Malik 10'; Mushtaq 12', 77'; Banaras 31', 79'; Mahmood 38'; N. Khan 57'; I. Khan 81'	Report (FIFA)

Alassane Ouattara Stadium, Abidjan
Referee: Natacha Konan (Ivory Coast)
9 April 2026
19:30 UTC+0

Ivory Coast	8–0	Mauritania
Kreto 6', 13', 31'; B. Amani 23'; Ouédraogo 41', 43'; Dagba 65'; Abrogoua 79'	Report (FIFA)

Alassane Ouattara Stadium, Abidjan
Referee: Jacqueline Nikiéma (Burkina Faso)

12 April 2026
16:00 UTC+0

Mauritania	1–0	Pakistan
Gangué 20'	Report (FIFA)

Alassane Ouattara Stadium, Abidjan
Referee: Odilone Ehui (Ivory Coast)
12 April 2026
19:30 UTC+0

Turks and Caicos	1–15	Ivory Coast
Moline 28'	Report (FIFA)	Diallo 6', 10', 23', 42'; Kreto 12' (pen.), 22', 27', 52'; Kouassi 32'; Kokora 45'; N'Guessan 45+3' (pen.); Konan 47', 77', 83'; Abrogoua 90+2'

Alassane Ouattara Stadium, Abidjan
Referee: Edoh Kindedji (Togo)

16 April 2026
16:00 UTC+0

Turks and Caicos	0–6	Mauritania
	Report (FIFA)	Diabira 17', 33' (pen.), 68'; Blal 26', 58'; G. Fall 74'

Alassane Ouattara Stadium, Abidjan
Referee: Natacha Konan (Ivory Coast)
16 April 2026
19:30 UTC+0

Ivory Coast	2–0	Pakistan
Diallo 40'; Ouédraogo 69'	Report (FIFA)

Alassane Ouattara Stadium, Abidjan
Referee: Jacqueline Nikiéma (Burkina Faso)

=== Thailand ===
The FIFA Series Thailand took place in Ratchaburi on 12 and 15 April 2026, and involved the host Thailand (AFC), DR Congo (CAF), Indonesia (AFC) and New Caledonia (OFC).

Nepal (AFC) was initially going to participate, but withdrew due to ANFA suspension by the Nepal Sports Council. There were replaced by Indonesia.

==== Bracket ====
Semi-finals
12 April – Ratchaburi
Thailand	4
New Caledonia	0
12 April – Ratchaburi
Indonesia	1
DR Congo	7

Final
15 April – Ratchaburi
Thailand	2
DR Congo	0
Third place play-off
15 April – Ratchaburi
New Caledonia	2
Indonesia	4

==== Semi-finals ====
12 April 2026
16:00 UTC+7

Indonesia	1–7	DR Congo
Scheunemann 7' (pen.)	Report (FIFA)	Kanjinga 23', 59'; Mawete 29', 74'; Kasaj 45+6'; Massombo 52'; Feza 82'

Ratchaburi Stadium, Ratchaburi
Referee: Pansa Chaisanit (Thailand)

12 April 2026
20:30 UTC+7

Thailand	4–0	New Caledonia
Natalie 4'; Thawanrat 28'; Janista 73'; Alisa 90+1'	Report (FIFA)

Ratchaburi Stadium, Ratchaburi
Referee: Kim Yu-jeong (South Korea)

==== Third place play-off ====
15 April 2026
16:00 UTC+7

New Caledonia	2–4	Indonesia
Honakoko 61'; Hmae 80'	Report (FIFA)	Nahon 19'; Sheva 28', 53'; Scheunemann 59'

Ratchaburi Stadium, Ratchaburi
Referee: Sunita Thongthawin (Thailand)

==== Final ====
15 April 2026
20:30 UTC+7

Thailand	2–0	DR Congo
Mårtensson 60'; Wiranya 90+4'	Report (FIFA)

Ratchaburi Stadium, Ratchaburi
Referee: Kim Yu-jeong (South Korea)

=== Kenya ===
The FIFA Series Kenya took place in Nairobi on 11 and 15 April 2026, and involved the host Kenya (CAF), Australia (AFC), India (AFC) and Malawi (CAF).

==== Bracket ====
Semi-finals
11 April – Nairobi
Kenya	2
India	0
11 April – Nairobi
Australia	5
Malawi	0

Final
15 April – Nairobi
Kenya	0
Australia	2
Third place play-off
15 April – Nairobi
India	3
Malawi	2

==== Semi-finals ====
11 April 2026
14:00 UTC+3

Australia	5–0	Malawi
Van Egmond 5'; Kerr 41'; Chidiac 60'; McNamara 86'; McKenna 90+4'	Report (FIFA)

Nyayo National Stadium, Nairobi
Referee: Emmanuela Clement (South Sudan)

11 April 2026
18:00 UTC+3

Kenya	2–0	India
Amnyolet 2'; Engesha 57'	Report (FIFA)

Nyayo National Stadium, Nairobi
Referee: Josephine Nantongo (Uganda)

==== Third place play-off ====
15 April 2026
14:00 UTC+3

India	3–2	Malawi
Oraon 19'; Singh 45+1'; Selladurai 84'	Report (FIFA)	Khumalo 43'; Henry 60'

Nyayo National Stadium, Nairobi
Referee: Yordanos Mulugeta (Ethiopia)

==== Final ====
15 April 2026
18:00 UTC+3

Kenya	0–2	Australia
	Report (FIFA)	Kerr 25'; Wheeler 54'

Nyayo National Stadium, Nairobi
Referee: Yordanos Mulugeta (Ethiopia)

== Goalscorers ==
There were 99 goals scored in 20 matches, for an average of 4.95 goals per match.

7 goals

- (Ivory Coast) Priscille Kreto

5 goals

- (Ivory Coast) Ami Diallo

3 goals

- (Ivory Coast) Inès Konan
- (Ivory Coast) Habibou Ouédraogo
- (Mauritania) Tacko Diabira

2 goals

- (Australia) Sam Kerr
- (Brazil) Kerolin
- (Brazil) Taina Maranhão
- (Canada) Annabelle Chukwu
- (Canada) Vanessa Gilles
- (Canada) Nichelle Prince
- (Ivory Coast) Akébié Abrogoua
- (Democratic Republic of the Congo) Merveille Kanjinga
- (Democratic Republic of the Congo) Flavine Mawete
- (Indonesia) Claudia Scheunemann
- (Indonesia) Sheva Imut
- (Mauritania) Leila Bilal
- (Pakistan) Layla Banaras
- (Pakistan) Aqsa Mushtaq
- (Zambia) Barbra Banda

1 goal

- (Australia) Alex Chidiac
- (Australia) Clare Wheeler
- (Australia) Leticia McKenna
- (Australia) Holly McNamara
- (Australia) Emily van Egmond
- (Brazil) Aline Gomes
- (Brazil) Angelina
- (Brazil) Ary Borges
- (Brazil) Dudinha
- (Brazil) Ludmila
- (Brazil) Raíssa Bahia
- (Brazil) Vitória Calhau
- (Brazil) Yasmim
- (Canada) Evelyne Viens
- (Ivory Coast) Bernadette Amani
- (Ivory Coast) Essi Dagba
- (Ivory Coast) Sylviane Kokora
- (Ivory Coast) Rosemonde Kouassi
- (Ivory Coast) Ange N'Guessan
- (Democratic Republic of the Congo) Jeannette Feza
- (Democratic Republic of the Congo) Marlène Kasaj
- (Democratic Republic of the Congo) Olga Massombo
- (Indonesia) Emily Nahon
- (India) Aveka Singh
- (India) Astam Oraon
- (India) Priyadharshini Selladurai
- (Kenya) Martha Amunyolet
- (Kenya) Tereza Engesha
- (Malawi) Deborah Henry
- (Malawi) Ireen Khumalo
- (Mauritania) Ramata Gangué
- (Mauritania) Ghaiba Fall
- (New Caledonia) Julia Honakoko
- (New Caledonia) Leana Hmae
- (Pakistan) Isra Khan
- (Pakistan) Nadia Khan
- (Pakistan) Mariam Mahmood
- (Pakistan) Zahmena Malik
- (South Korea) Kim Shin-ji
- (South Korea) Park Soo-jeong
- (South Korea) Casey Phair
- (Thailand) Janista Jinantuya
- (Thailand) Natalie Ngosuwan
- (Thailand) Thawanrat Promthongmee
- (Thailand) Alisa Rukpinij
- (Thailand) Matilda Mårtensson
- (Thailand) Wiranya Kwaenkasikarm
- (Turks and Caicos Islands) Irener Moline

== Summary ==
2026 FIFA Series (women's) summary
Tournament	Champions	Runners-up	Third-place	Player of the tournament
Brazil	Brazil	Canada	South Korea	(Brazil) Kerolin
Ivory Coast	Ivory Coast	Mauritania	Pakistan	(Ivory Coast) Habibou Ouédraogo
Kenya	Australia	Kenya	India	(Australia) Amy Sayer
Thailand	Thailand	DR Congo	Indonesia	(Thailand) Wiranya Kwaenkasikarm

== See also ==
- 2026 FIFA Series (men's matches)
