= Irene López (footballer) =

Spanish footballer (born 2001)

Personal information
- Full name: Irene López Ruiz
- Date of birth: 29 June 2001 (age 25)
- Place of birth: Madrid, Spain
- Height: 1.62 m (5 ft 4 in)
- Position: Midfielder

Youth career
- 2015–2016: Madrid CFF

Senior career*
Years	Team	Apps	(Gls)
2016–2017	Madrid CFF B		
2017–2019	Madrid CFF	25	(0)
2019–2020	Espanyol	2	(0)
2020–2022	Madrid CFF B	31	(2)
2020–2022	Madrid CFF	20	(0)
- * Club domestic league appearances and goals as of 11 December 2021

Irene López Ruiz (born 29 June 2001) is a Spanish former footballer who played as a midfielder for Madrid CFF before her retirement in February 2022.

== Club career ==
López started her career at Madrid CFF.
