= Zahmena Malik =

Pakistani footballer (born 2001)

Personal information
- Date of birth: 21 December 2001 (age 24)
- Place of birth: London, England
- Position: Forward

Team information
- Current team: Actonions

Youth career
- Tottenham Hotspur

Senior career*
Years	Team	Apps	(Gls)
2021–2024	London Seaward		
2024	Al-Hmmah		
2024–2026	Lakatamia		
2026–	Actonions		

International career
2023–	Pakistan	13	(3)
- * Club domestic league appearances and goals

Zahmena Malik (Urdu: زہمینہ ملک; born 21 December 2001) is a professional footballer who plays as a forward for Cypriot club Lakatamia. Born in England, she plays for the Pakistan national team.

== Club career ==
Zahmena Malik grew up playing for Tottenham Hotspur Girls as a teenager then moved on to college football, playing as a winger. She then played as a midfielder or forward for London Seaward. In February 2024, she moved to Saudi club Al-Hmmah. In December 2024, she joined Lakatamia in Cyprus.

== International career ==
Malik made her international debut for Pakistan in the country's first women's match against Comoros in 2023 SAFF Women's Friendly Tournament. Zahmena Malik scored the first goal of her international career against Tajikistan.

== Career statistics ==
=== International ===
Scores and results list Pakistan's goal tally first.

List of international goals scored by Zahmena Malik
No.	Date	Venue	Opponent	Score	Result	Competition
1	11 April 2023	Hisor Central Stadium, Hisor, Tajikistan	Tajikistan	1–0	1–0	2024 AFC Women's Olympic Qualifying Tournament
2	20 October 2024	Dasharath Rangasala, Kathmandu, Nepal	Bangladesh	1–0	1–1	2024 SAFF Women's Championship
3	9 April 2026	Alassane Ouattara Stadium, Abidjan, Ivory Coast	Turks and Caicos	1–0	8–0	2026 FIFA Series
