= Ainhoa Marín =

Spanish footballer (born 2001)

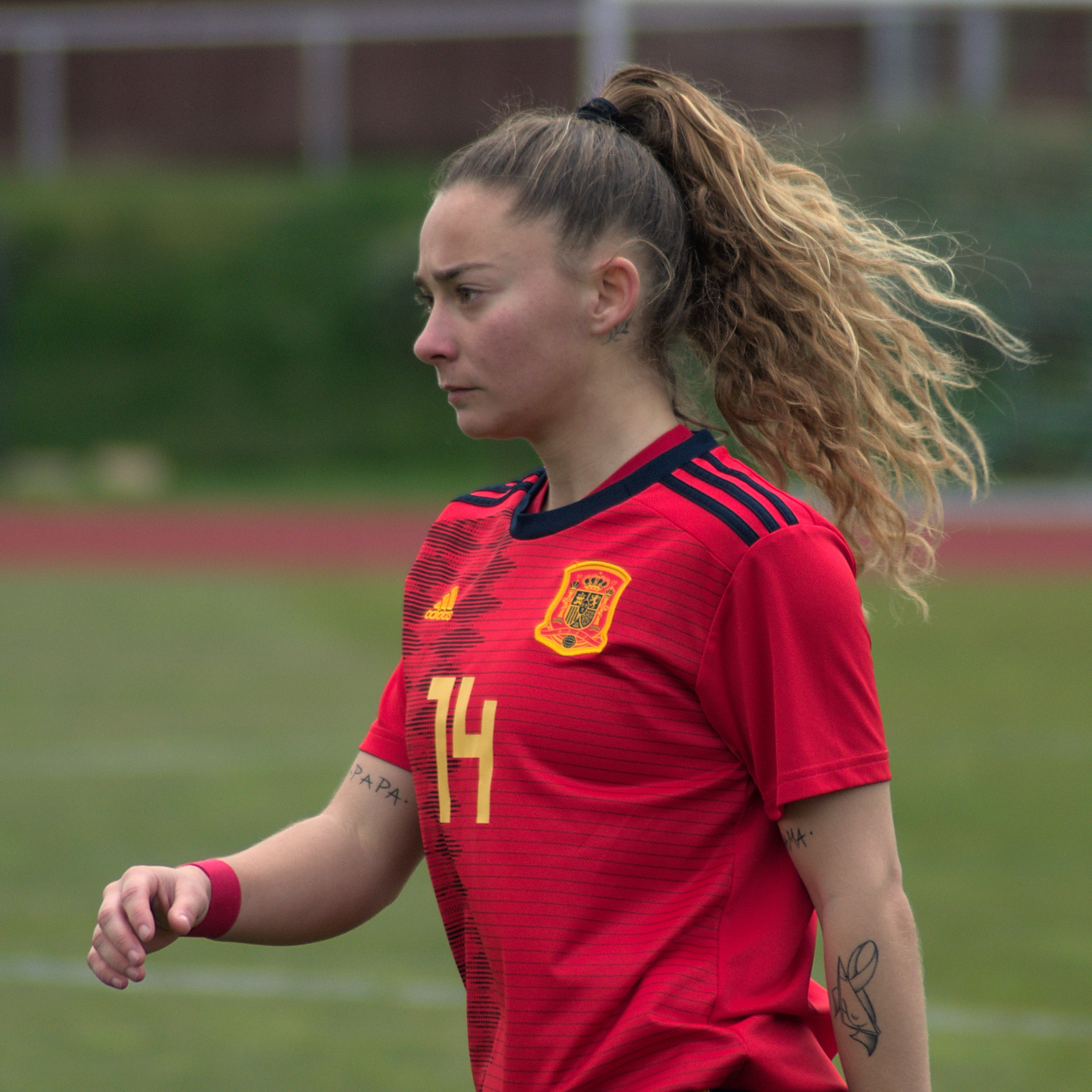
- Marín in 2020

Personal information
- Full name: Ainhoa Marín Martín
- Date of birth: 21 March 2001 (age 25)
- Place of birth: Badalona, Cataluña, Spain
- Height: 1.65 m (5 ft 5 in)
- Position: Forward

Team information
- Current team: Real Sociedad
- Number: 8

Senior career*
Years	Team	Apps	(Gls)
2018–2020	Espanyol	32	(1)
2020–2021	Club Esportiu Seagull		
2021–2026	Deportivo A Coruña	144	(34)
2026–	Real Sociedad	10	(3)

International career^{‡}
2018	Spain U17	1	(0)
2019	Spain U19	3	(3)
2021–2024	Spain U23	9	(1)
2026–	Spain	1	(0)
Medal record
Women's football
Representing Spain
FIFA U-17 Women's World Cup
Winner	2018 Uruguay
- * Club domestic league appearances and goals as of 17:31, 10 November 2026 (UTC) ‡ National team caps and goals as of 20:31, 11 October 2026 (UTC)

Ainhoa Marín Martín (born 21 March 2001) is a Spanish professional footballer who plays as a forward for Liga F club Real Sociedad and the Spain national team.

== Honours ==
Spain U17

- FIFA U-17 Women's World Cup: 2018
