= Ramata Gangué =

Mauritanian footballer

Personal information
- Full name: Ramatoulaye Gangué
- Place of birth: Mauritania
- Position: Midfielder

Team information
- Current team: AM Laâyoune
- Number: 19

Senior career*
Years	Team	Apps	(Gls)
–2023	FC Nouadhibou		
2023–	AM Laâyoune	40	(24)

International career^{‡}
2019–	Mauritania	13	(2)
- * Club domestic league appearances and goals as of 12 May 2025 ‡ National team caps and goals as of 12 April 2026

Ramatoulaye Gangué (Arabic: راماتولاي كينكي), commonly known as Ramata Gangué (Arabic: راماتا كينكي) is a Mauritanian professional footballer who plays as a midfielder for Western Sahara-based AM Laâyoune and the Mauritania women's national team.

== Club career ==
In August 2023, Gangué signed her first professional contract with Western Sahara-based AM Laâyoune in the Moroccan Women's Championship D1.

== International career ==
Gangué has been part of the Mauritanian national team since its formation in 2019, earning her first call-up for the team's historic debut against Djibouti. She made her international debut in that match, which ended in a 1–3 defeat to Les Gazelles. Having since become a regular in the starting lineup, Gangué scored her first international goal on 26 May 2025, helping secure Mauritania's first-ever victory with a 2–0 win over Guinea-Bissau.

=== International goals ===
Scores and results list Mauritania's goal tally first, score column indicates score after each Gangué goal.

No.	Date	Venue	Opponent	Score	Result	Competition
1	26 May 2025	Cheikha Ould Boïdiya Stadium, Nouakchott, Mauritania	Guinea-Bissau	1–0	2–0	2025 WAFU Zone A Women's Cup
2	12 April 2026	Alassane Ouattara Stadium, Abidjan, Ivory Coast	Pakistan	1–0	1–0	2026 FIFA Series
