= 2024 National Women's Football Championship (Pakistan) =

Tournament details
- Country: Pakistan
- Dates: 21 July – 10 August 2024
- Teams: 26

Final positions
- Champions: Karachi City
- Runners-up: Legacy
- Third place: Karachi United
- Fourth place: Hazara Quetta Football Academy
- SAFF Club Championship: Karachi City

Tournament statistics
- Matches played: 39
- Goals scored: 349 (8.95 per match)
- Top goal scorer(s): (Pakistan national football team) Zulfia Nazir (26 goals) (Complete Round) (Pakistan national football team) Eman Mustafa (8 goals) (Final Round)

Awards
- Best player: (Pakistan national football team) Nadia Khan
- Best goalkeeper: (Pakistan national football team) Nisha Ashraf

The 2024 National Women's Football Championship was the 13th edition of the National Women's Football Championship, the top-tier cup competition of women's association football in Pakistan.

First stage was held in Islamabad, Karachi, Lahore, and Quetta from 21 July to 26 July 2024. Second stage was held in Islamabad from 2 August to 10 August 2024. The tournament consisted of 26 teams, and was the first to feature no departmental teams, meaning that Pakistan Army was unable to defend their title. Karachi City were crowned champions on 10th of August 2024.

== Group Stage ==
A total of 24 teams participated in the tournament after the withdrawal of Shaheed Benazir Bhutto and Hazara Girls. Divided into 4 sections based on their location.

=== Balochistan Center ===
==== Group A ====
Pos	Team	Pld	W	D	L	GF	GA	GD	Pts
1	Hazara Quetta Football Academy	3	3	0	0	30	0	+30	9
2	Balochistan WFC	3	2	0	1	4	10	−6	6
3	Hazara United WFC	3	1	0	2	1	3	−2	3
4	Hazara Women WFC	3	0	0	3	2	24	−22	0

Source: PFF

=== Islamabad Center ===
==== Group A ====
Pos	Team	Pld	W	D	L	GF	GA	GD	Pts
1	Legacy	2	2	0	0	19	0	+19	6
2	Gilgit WFC	2	1	0	1	3	12	−9	3
3	Smurfs WFC	2	0	0	2	2	12	−10	0

Source: PFF

==== Group B ====
Pos	Team	Pld	W	D	L	GF	GA	GD	Pts
1	Highlanders WFC	2	2	0	0	21	1	+20	6
2	Strikers WFC	2	1	0	1	14	5	+9	3
3	Nawansher United WFC	2	0	0	2	0	29	−29	0

Source: PFF

=== Karachi Center ===
==== Group A ====
Pos	Team	Pld	W	D	L	GF	GA	GD	Pts
1	Karachi United	2	2	0	0	14	0	+14	6
2	MUK	2	1	0	1	7	5	+2	3
3	Young Muslim WFC	2	0	0	2	0	16	−16	0

Source: PFF

==== Group B ====
Pos	Team	Pld	W	D	L	GF	GA	GD	Pts
1	Karachi City	2	2	0	0	77	0	+77	6
2	Mohsen Gillani WFC	2	1	0	1	4	33	−29	3
3	Jahangir Memorial WFC	2	0	0	2	0	48	−48	0

Source: PFF

==== Group C ====
Pos	Team	Pld	W	D	L	GF	GA	GD	Pts
1	Diya	2	2	0	0	9	2	+7	6
2	Baloch Muhammadan WFC	2	1	0	1	7	5	+2	3
3	Over Seas WFC	2	0	0	2	1	10	−9	0

Source: PFF

==== Group D ====
Pos	Team	Pld	W	D	L	GF	GA	GD	Pts
1	Jafa	1	1	0	0	7	0	+7	3
2	Karachi Women	1	0	0	1	0	7	−7	0
3	Shaheed Benazir Bhutto	0	0	0	0	0	0	0	0
4	Hazara Girls	0	0	0	0	0	0	0	0

Source: PFF

=== Lahore Center ===
==== Group A ====
Pos	Team	Pld	W	D	L	GF	GA	GD	Pts
1	TWK LHR	2	2	0	0	26	0	+26	6
2	Real Lahore	2	1	0	1	6	6	0	3
3	Young Rising Stars	2	0	0	2	1	27	−26	0

Source: PFF

== Final Round ==
=== Group A ===
Pos	Team	Pld	W	D	L	GF	GA	GD	Pts
1	Karachi United	3	3	0	0	12	0	+12	9
2	Hazara Quetta Football Academy	3	2	0	1	9	5	+4	6
3	Highlanders WFC	3	0	1	2	2	5	−3	1
4	Jafa	3	0	1	2	1	14	−13	1

Source: PFF

=== Group B ===
Pos	Team	Pld	W	D	L	GF	GA	GD	Pts
1	Karachi City	3	3	0	0	25	0	+25	9
2	Legacy	3	2	0	1	14	3	+11	6
3	TWK LHR	3	1	0	2	13	9	+4	3
4	Diya	3	0	0	3	0	40	−40	0

Source: PFF

== Semi-finals ==
Team 1	Score	Team 2
Karachi City	8–0	Hazara Quetta Football Academy
Legacy	6–0	Karachi United

== Third place play-off ==
Team 1	Score	Team 2
Hazara Quetta Football Academy	2–3	Karachi United

== Final ==
Team 1	Score	Team 2
Legacy	0–4	Karachi City

== Awards ==
Award	Recipient	Club
Top Scorer	Eman Mustafa	Legacy
Most Valuable Player	Nadia Khan	Karachi City
Best Goalkeeper	Nisha Ashraf	Karachi City
Fair play	–	Hazara Quetta
