= Natacha Konan =

Ivorian association football referee

- Full name: Akissi Natacha Gérardine Konan
- Born: 1990 or 1991 (age 35–36); San Pedro, Ivory Coast

Domestic
Years	League	Role
2023–	CAF Women's Champions League	Referee

International
Years	League	Role
2022–	FIFA listed	Referee
2023	African Games	Referee
2024	FIFA U-20 Women's World Cup	Referee
2025	U-20 Africa Cup of Nations	Referee
2025	Women's Africa Cup of Nations	Referee

Akissi Natacha Gérardine Konan, commonly known as Natacha Konan is an Ivorian football referee and former player. She has been on the FIFA International Referees List since 2022.

== Career ==
Following a decade-long career as a left-back at Club Olympique de San Pédro, Konan chose to pursue refereeing. Following her nomination to the FIFA International Referees List in 2022, she took charge of various national team and World Cup qualifying fixtures. She became the first Ivorian referee to officiate at a FIFA women's tournament after being selected for the 2024 FIFA U-20 Women's World Cup in Colombia. In June 2025, she was appointed to officiate at the 2024 Women's Africa Cup of Nations, her first appointment at a senior-level international tournament, following prior experience in senior domestic matches and youth competitions.

== Controversy ==
In April 2024, Konan gained national attention during a Coupe de Côte d'Ivoire round of 16 match between Africa Sports and Stade d'Abidjan. While officiating the game, she issued a red card to Clément Kanouté, who reacted angrily. In response, Konan lost her composure and struck the player, knocking him to the ground. Following the incident, she received a warning and a four-match suspension.
