= Sahar Zaman (footballer) =

Pakistani footballer (born 1996)

Personal information
- Full name: Sahar Zaman
- Date of birth: 6 December 1996 (age 29)
- Place of birth: Gilgit-Baltistan, Pakistan
- Position: Midfielder

Senior career*
Years	Team	Apps	(Gls)
2008-2019	Young Rising Stars		
2019-	WAPDA		

International career
2010-	Pakistan		
- * Club domestic league appearances and goals

Sahar Zaman (born 6 December 1996) is a Pakistani footballer who plays as a midfielder. She is a member of the Pakistan women's national football team.

== Early life ==
Zaman is from the Gilgit-Baltistan region of Pakistan.

== Club career ==
At club level, Zaman has been for the Rawalpindi-based Young Rising Stars. She counts American goalkeeper Hope Solo as one of her inspirations. She got to see Solo in action when Young Rising Stars was invited to the United States on a Sports Envoy Programme in 2009, having won the 2008 National Women Football Championship. She was a part of the Young Rising Stars which won four consecutive National Championship titles from 2010 to 2013.

In 2020, she was part of the WAPDA team which finished third in the 12th edition of the National Women Football Championship. Zaman was awarded the Golden Boot for her 27 goals. In the 2021 National Women Football Championship, she was part of the WAPDA team which topped its group and reached the quarterfinals before the tournament was cancelled.

She has also won three gold medals in the women's football event at the National Games - two with Punjab, and one with WAPDA. While representing Punjab at the 2016 Quaid-e-Azam Inter Provincial Games, she was a part of the team which won the silver medal.

== International career ==
Zaman made her Pakistan debut aged 13 in the 2010 South Asian Games against India in Bangladesh. She was also part of the national team at the 2010 SAFF Women's Championship at Cox's Bazar, where she was the youngest player in the squad. She took part in a Pakistan training camp prior to the 2012 SAFF Women's Championship, and was also in the squad for the 2014 three-match series against Bahrain. In the 2014 SAFF Women's Championship in Islamabad, Zaman scored her first international goal in her side's 4-1 win over Bhutan.

== Career statistics ==
=== International ===
Scores and results list Pakistan's goal tally first.

List of international goals scored by Sahar Zaman
No.	Date	Venue	Opponent	Score	Result	Competition
1	16 November 2014	Jinnah Sports Stadium, Islamabad, Pakistan	Bhutan	1–0	4–1	2014 SAFF Women's Championship

== Honours ==
=== Young Rising Stars ===
- National Women Football Championship: 2008, 2010, 2011, 2012, 2013

=== Punjab ===
- National Games: 2012, 2013

=== WAPDA ===
- National Games: 2019

=== Individual ===
- National Women Football Championship Golden Boot: 2020
