= Asmara Kiani =

Pakistani footballer

Asmara Kiani اسمارہ کیانی
Personal information
- Full name: Asmara Habib Kiani
- Date of birth: 1993 (age 32–33)

Team information
- Current team: Highlanders

Senior career*
Years	Team	Apps	(Gls)
2007-2020	Young Rising Stars		
2021-	Highlanders		

International career
2010-	Pakistan		
- * Club domestic league appearances and goals

Asmara Habib Kiani is a Pakistani football player. She is a member of the national women football team and is also the head coach of the Total Football Youth Academy.

== Personal life ==
Asmara started playing football in her school years. She then joined a professional club to further her skill in football. Asmara and her club formed the Young Rising Stars in 2007. In an interview, Asmara stated that she faces the stereotype that football is not for women. She said it takes a lot of mental strength to deal with criticism but her father's support encouraged Asmara to move forward.

== Club career ==
Asmara joined the Young Rising Stars in 2007 and started participating in professional tournaments. In 2009, she represented Pakistan in the United States as part of a sports envoy exchange programme.

In 2012, Asmara became the captain of her club. She was a part of the YRS team which won the National Women Football Championship a record five times. She was awarded the Misha Dawood Trophy for the Best Player at the 2012 edition.

In 2017 as part of a Pakistani youth football team, Asmara and her team went to Australia to play at a tournament. She has also represented Pakistan in the SAF championship in Bhutan.

Asmara has also worked as a coach and as a sports development officer at the Total Football Youth Academy, where she provides football coaching to under 16 teams. She has also worked as an ambassador for football in Pakistan.

In 2021, she captained Highlanders Football Academy at the 2021 National Women Football Championship. Her team won all four of their group stage matches, and thus topped the group. However, the tournament was cancelled before the knockout round.

== International career ==
In 2010, Asmara represented the country in the first SAFF Women's Championship in Bangladesh as a member of Pakistan's national women football team. She also played for her country at the 2012 edition in Sri Lanka.

== Honors ==
=== Young Rising Stars ===
- National Women Football Championship: 2008, 2010, 2011, 2012, 2013

=== Individual ===
- Misha Dawood Trophy: 2012
