= Shahid Ahmad Khan =

Pakistani former footballer and manager

Personal information
- Full name: Shahid Ahmad Khan
- Date of birth: 1955 (age 70–71)
- Place of birth: Pakistan
- Position: Midfielder

Youth career
- Young Muhammadan FC

Senior career*
Years	Team	Apps	(Gls)
1973–??	Capital Development Authority		

International career
1987	Pakistan		

Managerial career
- 2007–??: Young Rising Stars
- * Club domestic league appearances and goals

Shahid Ahmad Khan is a Pakistani former footballer who played as a midfielder, and former manager. Khan is among the major Pakistani football players of the 1980s, and is one of the most successful football coaches.

== Early life ==
Khan started playing football in 1963, at the age of 8, with Young Mohammedan Football Club Peshawar. He studied at Cantt Public School Peshawar.

== Club career ==
Khan later moved to Islamabad, where he became a part of the Capital Development Authority departmental team in 1973. He also represented Rawalpindi Division at the National Football Championship. Khan was selected for the Sattar Club in 1977, when the team toured Afghanistan and played four matches there.

== International career ==
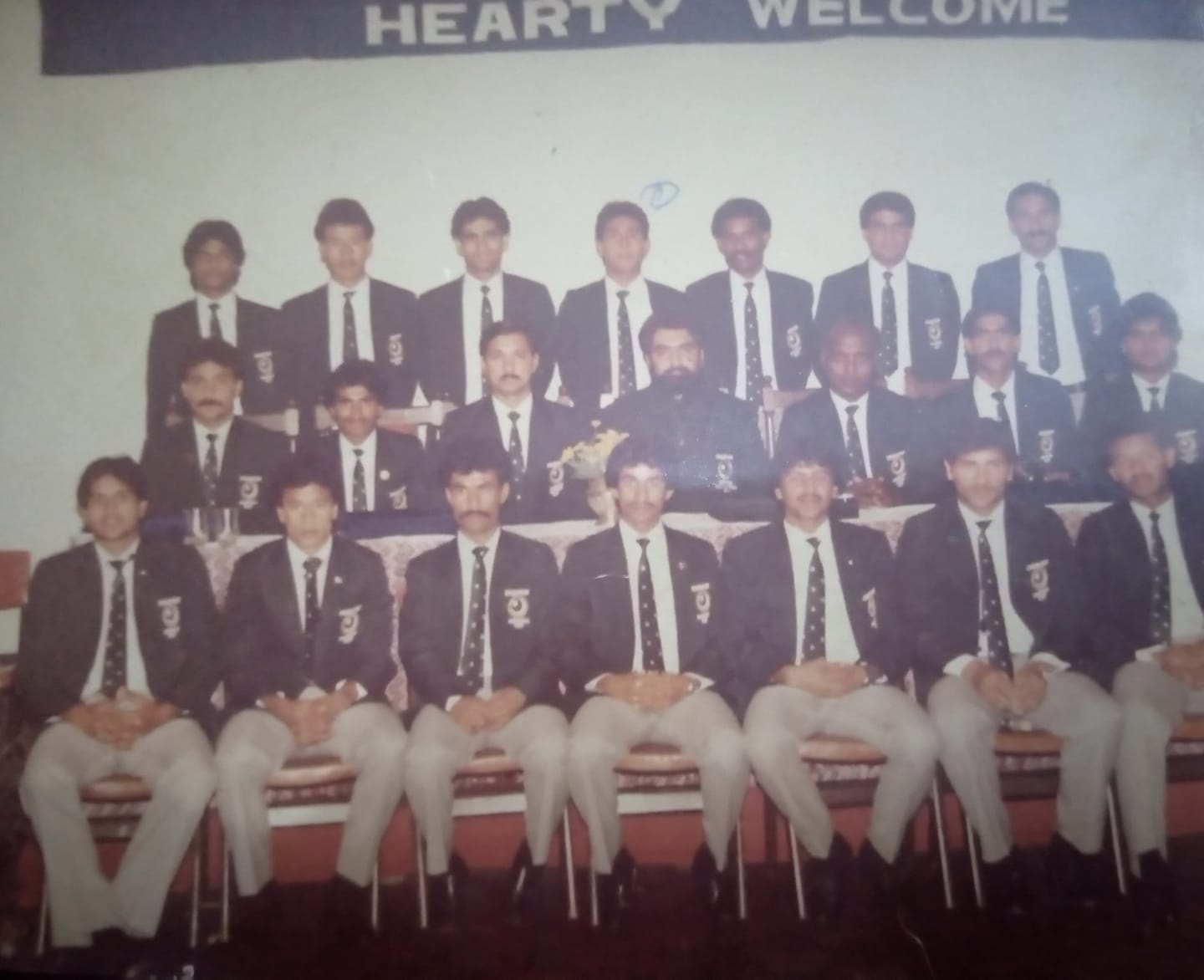
Khan in top row standing second from right to left, with Pakistan in 1987

In 1981, Khan was kept on standby in the Pakistan national football team for the tour to Burma and the 1981 King's Cup in Thailand. In 1987, Khan was made part of the national team that played the 1988 Summer Olympics Qualification in Nepal.

== Refereeing career ==
In 1993 and 1994, Khan was appointed on the FIFA referees list. Khan also supervised matches in the Pakistan Premier League and later he also served as the referee inspector and match commissioner in the league.

== Coaching career ==
Khan became head coach of the Young Rising Stars in 2007, and successfully led the team to five National Women Football Championship titles. These performances led the players and the management to be invited to a two-week tour of the United States in April 2009. However, Pakistan Football Federation implemented a two-year ban on the club including head coach Shahid, for undertaking a foreign tour without obtaining a No Objection Certificate from the relevant authorities. The club was allowed to continue its operations under an interim set-up.

== Honours ==
=== Coach ===
==== Young Rising Stars ====
- National Women Football Championship:
  - Winners (5): 2008, 2010, 2011, 2012, 2013
