= Women's football in Pakistan =

- Country: Pakistan
- Governing body: Pakistan Football Federation
- National team: Women's national team

National competitions
- SAFF Women's Championship

Club competitions
- Cups: National Women Football Championship; National Inter-Club Women Football Championship (defunct); PFF National Under-19 Women’s Football Championship; Shahlyla Baloch National Women U-16 Championship

International competitions
- Olympics; FIFA Women's World Cup (National Team); AFC Women's Asian Cup (National Team)

Women's football in Pakistan officially began with the establishment of the first women club Diya WFC in 2002. Despite facing challenges, including societal norms and limited resources, women's football has garnered support and recognition.

One the barriers of the sport growing is it coached by men so the Pakistan FA are encouraging more women to coach and referee.

== History ==
Women's football in Pakistan has experienced notable growth and development, gradually carving out its place within the broader narrative of football in the country. The inception of women's football in Pakistan can be traced back to 2002 with the establishment of Diya W.F.C., the first female football club.

With a limited participation of women in the game, and mainly restricted to the affluent class of the country, it was first encouraged by the relatively moderate government of former President Pervez Musharaf, the Pakistan Football Federation staged its first-ever women’s football match in September 2004. The first edition of the National Women Football Championship was held one year later. The establishment of the National Women Football Championship has been a significant milestone, providing a platform for female footballers to showcase their skills at the domestic level. The championship, contested by teams from various regions, contributes to talent identification and the overall development of women's football in the country.

=== 2010: Formation of the women national team ===
The Pakistan women's national football team was formed in 2010, and made its international debut at the 11th South Asian Games in Dhaka. It played its first match on 31 January 2010 against India at the Bangabandhu National Stadium. It also faced off against Bangladesh, Sri Lanka, and Nepal in that tournament, winning against Sri Lanka via walkover while losing the other two fixtures. It came in 4th out of 5 teams. In December 2010, the team, under coach Tariq Lutfi, participated in the inaugural SAFF Women's Championship held at Cox's Bazar Stadium. It stood second Group B, winning against Maldives (2–1) and Afghanistan (3–0), while losing heavily to Nepal (0–12). India were the opponents in the semifinal, but Pakistan lost 8–0 and were thus eliminated. In this tournament, Mehwish Khan became the first ever goal-scorer for Pakistan (in the match against Maldives). As a result of these official matches, Pakistan entered the FIFA Women's World Rankings for the first time on 18 March 2011. It stood 121 in the World and 22 in Asia.

In recent years, there has been a growing emphasis on initiatives aimed at encouraging young girls to take up football. These programs focus on providing access to coaching, facilities, and opportunities for skill development. With ongoing support and recognition, women's football in Pakistan is set up to contribute significantly to the country's sporting landscape in the years to come.

== Cup competitions ==
=== Domestic ===
- National Women Football Championship: Annual top-tier cup competition started in 2005 by the Pakistan Football Federation.
- National Inter-Club Women Football Championship: A club cup competition was organised to provide competition to the country's club teams. It purposely excluded all departmental teams. 6 editions were held with the last one in 2014.

=== Regional ===
- National Games of Pakistan: Competition for provincial teams and departmental teams of Pakistan.

=== Youth ===
- PFF National Under-19 Women’s Football Championship
- Shahlyla Baloch National Women U-16 Championship: Annual domestic tournament organized for under-16 teams by the Pakistan Football Federation. Founded in 2014 as the National U-16 Inter-Club Women Football Championship, the tournament was renamed after Shahlyla Baloch, a forward for Pakistan women's national football team, who died in a car accident in 2016.

== National teams ==
- Pakistan women's national football team
- Pakistan women's national under-20 football team
- Pakistan women's national under-17 football team

== See also ==
- Football in Pakistan
- Pakistan women's national football team
