= 2006 National Women's Football Championship (Pakistan) =

Tournament details
- Country: Pakistan
- City: Islamabad
- Venue: Jinnah Sports Stadium
- Dates: 19 - 28 August 2006
- Teams: 12

Final positions
- Champions: WAPDA (1st title)
- Runners-up: Islamabad
- Third place: Balochistan Red
- Fourth place: Sindh Green

Tournament statistics
- Matches played: 20
- Goals scored: 24 (1.2 per match)
- Top goal scorer: Rifat Mehdi (Balochistan Red)

Awards
- Mejzgaan Orakzai (Islamabad)

The 2006 National Women's Football Championship was the second season of the National Women's Football Championship, the top-tier of women's football in Pakistan. The tournament took place from 19 to 28 August 2006 at Jinnah Sports Stadium in Islamabad.

WAPDA won their maiden title, beating Islamabad 1-0 in the final. Mejzgaan Orakzai of Islamabad and Riffat Mehdi of Balochistan Red were the top scorers.

== Teams ==
Twelve teams competed in the tournament.

- Azad Jammu & Kashmir
- Balochistan
- Balochistan Red
- Diya
- Islamabad
- Karachi Kickers
- Pakistan Police
- Punjab
- Punjab University
- Sindh Green
- Sindh Red
- WAPDA
