= 2018 National Women's Football Championship (Pakistan) =

Tournament details
- Country: Pakistan
- City: Lahore
- Venue(s): Punjab Stadium; LCWU Ground; MTFA Ground
- Dates: 16–25 October 2018
- Teams: 14

Final positions
- Champions: Pakistan Army (1st title)
- Runners-up: WAPDA
- Third place: Punjab
- Fourth place: Karachi United

Tournament statistics
- Matches played: 22
- Goals scored: 104 (4.73 per match)
- Top goal scorer: Masooma Chaudhry

Awards
- Khadija
- Best goalkeeper: Syeda Mahpara (2 clean sheets)

The 2018 National Women's Football Championship was the 11th season of the National Women's Football Championship, the top tier of women's football in Pakistan.

Pakistan Army won their maiden title after beating WAPDA 3–0 on penalties after the match had ended 1–1 after extra time at the Punjab Stadium.

== Teams ==
This edition was the first one to be held since 2014, and 14 teams were selected for the competition:

- Balochistan United
- Diya
- Gilgit-Baltistan FA
- Islamabad
- Karachi Kickers
- Karachi United
- Karachi
- Khyber Pakhtunkhwa
- Model Town
- Pakistan Army
- Punjab
- Royal Eagles
- WAPDA
- Young Rising Stars
