= 2012 National Women's Football Championship (Pakistan) =

Tournament details
- Country: Pakistan
- City: Islamabad
- Venue: Jinnah Sports Stadium
- Dates: 28 September 2012 - 9 October 2012
- Teams: 12

Final positions
- Champions: Young Rising Stars (4th title)
- Runners-up: WAPDA
- Third place: Balochistan United
- Fourth place: Islamabad

Tournament statistics
- Top goal scorer: Hajra Khan

Awards
- Misha Dawood Trophy (Best Player): Asmara Habib
- Best goalkeeper: Syeda Mahpara

The 2012 National Women's Football Championship was the 8th season of the National Women's Football Championship, the top-tier of women's football in Pakistan. The tournament ran from 28 September to 9 October 2012 in Jinnah Sports Stadium, Islamabad.

Young Rising Stars were able to defend their title and win their fourth national championship by beating WAPDA 2–0 on penalties in the final, after the match had ended 1-1.

== Teams ==
A total of 12 teams took part in the tournament:

- Azad Jammu and Kashmir
- Balochistan United
- Higher Education Commission
- Islamabad
- Khyber Pakhtunkhwa
- Lahore School of Economics
- Pakistan Army
- Punjab
- Sindh
- TCS
- WAPDA
- Young Rising Stars

== Knockout stage ==
=== Semi-finals ===
7 October 2012

Islamabad	2–1	WAPDA
Eman 15'		Rafia 37'; Sheeka 39'

Jinnah Sports Stadium, Islamabad
7 October 2012

Young Rising Stars	1–0	Balochistan United
Asmara Habib 39'

Jinnah Sports Stadium, Islamabad

=== Third-place match ===
8 October 2012

Balochistan United	2–0	Islamabad
Arooj 39'; Rifat 61'

Jinnah Sports Stadium, Islamabad

=== Final ===
9 October 2012

Young Rising Stars	1–1 (a.e.t.)	WAPDA
Penalties
Sana Mehmood (penalty scored); Asmara Habib (penalty scored)	2-0

Jinnah Sports Stadium, Islamabad

== Awards ==
In a special meeting on 25 September 2012, PFF President Faisal Saleh Hayat approved the prize money package for the tournament. The following awards were presented in the closing ceremony:

- Winner's trophy plus Rs. 3,00,000 cash: Young Rising Stars
- Runner-up trophy plus Rs. 2,00,000 cash: WAPDA,
- Third position trophy plus Rs. 150,000 cash: Balochistan United
- Fairplay trophy plus Rs 40,000 cash: Vehari United,
- Best Goalkeeper trophy plus Rs. 40,000 cash: Syeda Mahpara (Young Rising Stars)
- Best Player (Misha Dawood Trophy) plus Rs. 50,000 cash: Asmara Habib (Young Rising Stars)
- Top Goal Scorer plus Rs. 40,000 cash: Hajra Khan (Diya)
- Best Referee plus Rs. 30,000 cash: Imran Hussain (Karachi)
- Best assistant referee (female) plus Rs. 15,000 cash: Yasmin Zareen
