= 2019–20 National Women's Football Championship (Pakistan) =

2019-2020 National Women's Football Championship
Tournament details
- Country: Pakistan
- City: Karachi
- Venue(s): Karachi United Stadium; KPT Stadium
- Dates: Qualifying Round: November–December 2019; Final Round: 1–12 January 2020
- Teams: 8

Final positions
- Champions: Pakistan Army (2nd title)
- Runners-up: Karachi United
- Third place: WAPDA
- Fourth place: Punjab

Tournament statistics
- Matches played: 16
- Goals scored: 102 (6.38 per match)
- Top goal scorer: Sahar Zaman (27 goals)

Awards
- Suha Herani
- Best goalkeeper: Syeda Mahpara (4 clean sheets)

The 2019-2020 National Women's Football Championship was the 12th season of the National Women's Football Championship, the top tier of women's football in Pakistan. The tournament took place in two phases: qualifying round in November 2019 and final round from 1 to 12 January 2020 in Karachi.

Defending champions Pakistan Army retained their title by beating Karachi United 7–1 in the final.

== Qualifying round ==
The qualifying round with 20 teams was held in November and December 2019 in three cities: Islamabad, Karachi and Lahore. The following 8 teams qualified for the final round:

- Diya
- Gilgit-Baltistan FA
- JAFA Soccer Academy
- Karachi Kickers
- Karachi United
- Pakistan Army
- Punjab
- WAPDA

== Final round ==
=== Teams ===
For this edition, the qualifying round gathered 20 teams in November and December 2019 in Lahore, Karachi and Islamabad and 8 teams were selected for the final competition, instead of 14 during the 2018 edition and 20 during the 2021 edition starting in March.

Football authorities were alleged to favour Karachi United as the competition took place in their home stadium and criticized because the playing field was not suitable for 11-a-side matches

=== Group stages ===
==== Group A ====
Pos	Team	Pld	W	D	L	GF	GA	GD	Pts	Qualification
1	WAPDA	3	3	0	0	17	0	+17	9	Advance to Knockout round
2	Karachi United	3	2	0	1	12	1	+11	6	Advance to Knockout round
3	JAFA Soccer Academy	3	1	0	2	1	9	−8	3	
4	Gilgit-Baltistan FA	3	0	0	3	0	20	−20	0	

Source: GSA
2 January 2020
09:00 (UTC+5)

JAFA Soccer Academy	0–5	WAPDA
	Report

Karachi United Stadium, Karachi
2 January 2020
11:00 (UTC+5)

Karachi United	0–8	Gilgit-Baltistan FA
	Report

Karachi United Stadium, Karachi
5 January 2020
09:00 (UTC+5)

WAPDA	11-0	Gilgit-Baltistan FA
	Report

Karachi United Stadium, Karachi
5 January 2020
11:00 (UTC+5)

JAFA Soccer Academy	0–4	Karachi United
	Report

Karachi United Stadium, Karachi
7 January 2020
09:00 (UTC+5)

JAFA Soccer Academy	1–0	Gilgit-Baltistan FA
	Report

Karachi United Stadium, Karachi
7 January 2020
11:00 (UTC+5)

Karachi United	0–1	WAPDA
	Report

KPT Stadium, Karachi

==== Group B ====
Pos	Team	Pld	W	D	L	GF	GA	GD	Pts	Qualification
1	Punjab	3	3	0	0	17	0	+17	9	Advance to Knockout round
2	Pakistan Army	3	2	0	1	19	1	+18	6	Advance to Knockout round
3	Diya W.F.C.	3	1	0	2	3	3	0	3	
4	Karachi Kickers	3	0	0	3	0	35	−35	0	

Source: GSA
1 January 2020
09:00 (UTC+5)

Diya	0–11	Pakistan Army
	Report

KPT Stadium, Karachi
1 January 2020
11:00 (UTC+5)

Karachi Kickers	0–14	Punjab
	Report

KPT Stadium, Karachi
3 January 2020
09:00 (UTC+5)

Karachi Kickers	0–18	Pakistan Army
	Report

KPT Stadium, Karachi
3 January 2020
11:00 (UTC+5)

Diya	0–2	Punjab
	Report

KPT Stadium, Karachi
7 January 2020
09:00 (UTC+5)

Pakistan Army	0–1	Punjab
	Report

Karachi United Stadium, Karachi
7 January 2020
11:00 (UTC+5)

Diya	3–0	Karachi Kickers
	Report

KPT Stadium, Karachi

=== Knockout round ===
==== Semi-finals ====
10 January 2020
06:30 (UTC+5)

Punjab	0–2	Karachi United
	Report

Karachi United Stadium, Karachi
10 January 2020
12:30 (UTC+5)

WAPDA	1–2 (a.e.t.)	Pakistan Army
	Report

Karachi United Stadium, Karachi

==== Third place ====
12 January 2020
06:30 (UTC+5)

WAPDA	10–0	Punjab
	Report

Karachi United Stadium, Karachi

==== Finals ====
12 January 2020
12:30 (UTC+5)

Karachi United	1–7	Pakistan Army
	Report

Karachi United Stadium, Karachi

== Awards ==
- Best goalkeeper to Syeda Mahpara, WAPDA's captain.
- Golden boot to WAPDA's Sahar Zaman for scoring 27 goals.
- Most valuable player to Suha Herani of Karachi United.
