= 2007 National Women's Football Championship (Pakistan) =

Tournament details
- Country: Pakistan
- City: Islamabad
- Venue: Jinnah Sports Stadium
- Dates: August 2007
- Teams: 14

Final positions
- Champions: Sports Sciences (1st title)
- Runners-up: Afghanistan
- Third place: Diya
- Fourth place: Balochistan

Tournament statistics
- Top goal scorer: Rifat Mehdi (Balochistan)

The 2007 National Women's Football Championship was the third season of the National Women's Football Championship, the top-tier of women's football in Pakistan. The tournament took place in August 2007 at Jinnah Sports Stadium in Islamabad.

Lahore's Sports Sciences Women Club won their maiden title by beating the guest team Afghanistan 1–0 in the final. Rifat Mehdi of Balochistan Red was the top scorer.

== Teams ==
Fourteen teams took part in the tournament.

- Afghanistan (guest team)
- Azad Jammu & Kashmir's Pilot
- Balochistan
- Diya
- Islamabad
- Wapda
- Sindh
- Punjab
- Sports Sciences
- Young Rising Star Red
- Lahore Women
- Young Rising Star Blue
- Higher Education Commission
- Mardan
