= Shahlyla Baloch National Women U-16 Championship =

Football tournament in Pakistan

Shahlyla Baloch National Women Under-16 Championship
- Organiser(s): Pakistan Football Federation
- Founded: 2014; 12 years ago
- Current champions: Model Town Football Academy

The Shahlyla Baloch National Women Under-16 Championship is an annual domestic football tournament organized for under-16 teams by the Pakistan Football Federation. Founded in 2014 as the National U-16 Inter-Club Women Football Championship, the tournament was renamed after Shahlyla Baloch, a forward for Pakistan women's national football team, who died in a car accident in 2016.

== Tournament summary ==
Edition	Year	No. of teams	Venue	Winner	Runner-up	3rd place	4th place	Fair play trophy	Ref.
1st	2014	6	Divisional Public School Football Ground, Rawalpindi	Young Rising Stars	Soccer Queens				
2nd	2015		MTFA Ground, Lahore	Model Town Football Academy	Young Rising Stars	Diya W.F.C.	CDSS WFC		
	2018	8	MTFA Ground, Lahore	Model Town Football Academy	Karachi Kickers	Diya W.F.C.	Islamabad Football Association	Model Town Football Academy	

== See also ==
- National Women Football Championship
