= 2005 National Women's Football Championship (Pakistan) =

Tournament details
- Country: Pakistan
- City: Islamabad
- Venue: Jinnah Sports Stadium
- Dates: 23 - 29 September 2005
- Teams: 8

Final positions
- Champions: Punjab (1st title)
- Runners-up: WAPDA
- Third place: Balochistan
- Fourth place: Sindh

Tournament statistics
- Matches played: 16
- Goals scored: 34 (2.13 per match)
- Top goal scorer: Khalida Noor (WAPDA)

Awards
- Munazzeh Shahid (Islamabad)

The 2005 National Women's Football Championship was the inaugural edition of the National Women's Football Championship, the top-tier of women's football in Pakistan.

The event took place from 23 to 29 September 2005 at Jinnah Sports Stadium in Islamabad.

Punjab won the championship by beating WAPDA 1–0 in the final. Balochistan beat Sindh in the third-place playoff to clinch the third position.

== Teams ==
Eight teams took part in the event.

- Azad Jammu & Kashmir
- Balochistan
- Football School of Excellence
- Islamabad
- Punjab
- NWFP
- Sindh
- WAPDA
