= 2008 National Women's Football Championship (Pakistan) =

Tournament details
- Country: Pakistan
- City: Islamabad
- Venue: Jinnah Sports Stadium
- Dates: 20 August 2008 - 30 August 2008
- Teams: 13

Final positions
- Champions: Young Rising Stars (1st title)
- Runners-up: WAPDA
- Third place: Sports Sciences
- Fourth place: Islamabad

Tournament statistics
- Matches played: 23
- Goals scored: 74 (3.22 per match)
- Top goal scorer: Hajra Khan (Diya)

Awards
- Nadia Bhatti (Young Rising Stars)
- Best goalkeeper: Saba Awan (Sports Sciences)

The 2008 National Women's Football Championship was the fourth season of the National Women's Football Championship, the top-tier of women's football in Pakistan.

The tournament took place from 20 to 30 August 2008 at Jinnah Sports Stadium in Islamabad, and was organized by the Islamabad Football Association under the directives of the Pakistan Football Federation.

Young Rising Stars won their first title by beating WAPDA 5-3 on penalties in the final after the match had ended goalless in regular time.

== Teams ==
Thirteen teams took park in the event:

- Azad Jammu & Kashmir
- Balochistan
- Diya
- Higher Education Commission
- Islamabad
- NWFP
- Pakistan Police
- Punjab
- Sindh
- Sports Sciences
- Vehari United
- WAPDA
- Young Rising Stars

== Knockout stage ==
=== Quarter-finals ===
25 August 2008

Islamabad	3–1 (a.e.t.)	Vehari United

Jinnah Sports Stadium, Islamabad
25 August 2008

Sports Sciences	2–0	Balochistan

Jinnah Sports Stadium, Islamabad
26 August 2008

Diya	1–2	Young Rising Stars
Marium Laghari 46' (pen.)	Report	Nadia Bhatti 23' (pen.), 42' (pen.)

Jinnah Sports Stadium, Islamabad
Referee: Hidayat Ullah
26 August 2008

WAPDA	4–0	Higher Education of Pakistan
Azra Nasir 26'; Humera 34'; Shabana Kausar 40'; Aqeela Nasim 86'	Report

Jinnah Sports Stadium, Islamabad

=== Semi-finals ===
28 August 2008

Young Rising Stars	0–0 (a.e.t.)	Sports Sciences
	Report
Penalties
Nadia Bhatti (penalty scored)	1-0

Jinnah Sports Stadium, Islamabad
28 August 2008

WAPDA	1–0	Islamabad
Naila Rani 86'	Report

Jinnah Sports Stadium, Islamabad

=== Third-place match ===
29 August 2008

Sports Sciences	2–0	Islamabad

Jinnah Sports Stadium, Islamabad

=== Final ===
28 August 2008

Young Rising Stars	0–0 (a.e.t.)	WAPDA
	Report
Penalties
	5-4

Jinnah Sports Stadium, Islamabad
