= National Women's Football Championship (Pakistan) =

Pakistan Women's professional football league

- Organising body: Pakistan Football Federation
- Founded: 2005; 21 years ago
- Country: Pakistan
- Confederation: AFC
- Number of clubs: 24 (2024)
- International cup: SAFF Women's Club Championship
- Current champions: Karachi City (1st title)
- Most championships: Young Rising Stars (5 titles)
- Top scorer: Hajra Khan (111 goals)
- Broadcaster: PTV Sports
- Current: 2026

The National Women's Football Championship is the top cup competition for women's football clubs in Pakistan. It was started in 2005 by the Pakistan Football Federation.

Young Rising Stars has been the most successful team in the history of the competition, winning it five times (including four consecutive wins from 2010 to 2013). The most recent champion is Karachi City, which won in the 2024 edition.

== History ==
The first edition was held in 2005, organised by Pakistan Football Federation (PFF).

On 4 August 2010, PFF president Faisal Saleh Hayat dedicated the Best Player Award of the National Women Football Championship to Misha Dawood, the late Diya WFC midfielder. Misha had been on the ill-fated Airblue Flight 202 which crashed in the Margalla Hills on 28 July 2010.

Due to the political and judicial crisis of 2015 at the PFF, the championship was not held from 2015 to 2018.

The 2021 edition was cancelled, no official reason was given, but the decision took place after the Pakistan Football Federation's office was attacked and people inside held hostage by its former president, Syed Ashfaq Hussain Shah, and his group. The championship was interrupted before the knockout stage started.

== Format ==
The number of teams participating has varied through the years. In the first edition, 8 teams took part. In the 2018 edition, 16 teams participated in the tournament, with three departmental teams, four provincial teams, four regional teams and five club teams, divided into four groups, winner of each group would earn a spot in semi-finals.

Since the 2024 edition, only club sides, excluding the departmental and provincial teams have been eligible to participate in the National Women Football Championship.

== Tournament summary ==
Edition	Year	No. of teams	Winners	Runners-up	Third position	Fourth position	Misha Dawood Trophy (best player)	Top scorer	Best goalkeeper	Fair-play award
1st	2005	8	Punjab	WAPDA	Balochistan	Sindh	Munazzeh Shahid	Khalida Noor		Islamabad
2nd	2006	12	WAPDA	Islamabad	Balochistan Red	Sindh Greens	Mejzgaan Orakzai	Rifat Mehdi		
3rd	2007	14	Sports Sciences Department	Afghanistan^{g}	Diya	Balochistan		Rifat Mehdi		
4th	2008	13	Young Rising Stars	WAPDA	Sports Sciences Department	Islamabad	Nadia Bhatti	Hajra Khan	Saba Awan	Islamabad
5th	2009	13	Malavan BA^{g}	Sports Sciences Department	Young Rising Stars	WAPDA	Mariam Irandost			
6th	2010	12	Young Rising Stars	WAPDA	Sports Sciences Department	Islamabad	Hajra Khan	Malika-e-Noor	Syeda Mahpara	
7th	2011	16	Young Rising Stars	Diya	WAPDA	Balochistan United	Hajra Khan	Malika-e-Noor	Syeda Mahpara	Balochistan United
8th	2012	12	Young Rising Stars	WAPDA	Balochistan United	Islamabad	Asmara Habib Kiani	Hajra Khan	Syeda Mahpara	Vehari United
9th	2013	16	Young Rising Stars	Balochistan United	Pakistan Army	Islamabad				
10th	2014	16	Balochistan United	WAPDA	Pakistan Army	Diya	Malika-e-Noor	Hajra Khan	Syeda Mahpara	Pakistan Army
11th	2018	14	Pakistan Army	WAPDA	Punjab	Karachi United	Khadija	Masooma Chaudhry	Syeda Mahpara	Punjab
12th	2019–20	20 (qual.) 8 (final round)	Pakistan Army	Karachi United	WAPDA	Punjab	Suha Herani	Sahar Zaman	Syeda Mahpara	
n/a	2021	19	Cancelled midway							
13th	2024	24	Karachi City	Legacy	Karachi United	Hazara Quetta Football Academy	Nadia Khan	Eman Mustafa	Nisha Ashraf	Hazara Quetta Football Academy

== List of finals ==
Edition	Year	Winners	Score	Runners up	Scorers	Venue
1st	2005	Punjab	1–0	WAPDA	Punjab: Shika Nazir Masih 53'	Jinnah Sports Stadium, Islamabad
2nd	2006	WAPDA	1–0	Islamabad	WAPDA: Misbah Siddiqui	Jinnah Sports Stadium, Islamabad
3rd	2007	Sports Sciences Department	1–0	Afghanistan^{g}	Sports Sciences Department: Ayesha Khan 26'	Jinnah Sports Stadium, Islamabad
4th	2008	Young Rising Stars	0–0 (a.e.t) (5–4 pen.)	WAPDA		Jinnah Sports Stadium, Islamabad
5th	2009	Malavan BA^{g}	11–0	Sports Sciences Department	Malavan BA: Fereshteh Karimi 2', 5', Maryam Irandost 26', 37', Neda Abdollahzadeh 30', Sara Ghomi Marzdahti 35', Fatemeh Arzhangi 43', Hajar Shahmalekpour 56', 59', 68', Sepideh Nazhati 70'	Jinnah Sports Stadium, Islamabad
6th	2010	Young Rising Stars	2-0	WAPDA	Young Rising Stars: Malika-e-Noor 20', Asma Yaseen 55'	Jinnah Sports Stadium, Islamabad
7th	2011	Young Rising Stars	1–1 (a.e.t) (4–3 pen.)	Diya	Young Rising Stars: Malika-e-Noor 50' (pen.); Diya: Hajra Khan 18'	Jinnah Sports Stadium, Islamabad
8th	2012	Young Rising Stars	1–1 (a.e.t) (2–0 pen.)	WAPDA	Young Rising Stars: Sana Mahmud 45'; WAPDA: Mahwish 49'	Jinnah Sports Stadium, Islamabad
9th	2013	Young Rising Stars	0–0 (a.e.t) (3–2 pen.)	Balochistan United		Punjab Stadium, Lahore
10th	2014	Balochistan United	7–0	WAPDA	Balochistan United: Hajra Khan 4', 24', 39', Shahlyla Ahmadzai 54', Joyana 50', 90+2', Nadia 60'	Punjab Stadium, Lahore
11th	2018	Pakistan Army	1–1 (a.e.t) (3–0 pen.)	WAPDA	Pakistan Army: Khadija 41' WAPDA: Sidra 44'	Punjab Stadium, Lahore
12th	2019-20	Pakistan Army	7–1	Karachi United	Pakistan Army: Hajra 3', Eshal 25', 81', Alina 37', 90+3', Malika 40', Aliza 80' Karachi United: Suha Hirani 49'	Karachi United Stadium, Karachi
13th	2024	Karachi City	4–0	Legacy	Karachi City: Rameen Farid 14', Sanah Mehdi 28', Zahmena Malik 52', Zulfia Nazir 75'	Jinnah Stadium, Islamabad

- ^{g} Guest teams invited by Pakistan Football Federation, Afghanistan represented Afghanistan and Malavan BA represented Iran.

== Performance by club ==
Club	Winners	Runners-up	Winning year(s)	Runner-up years
Young Rising Stars	5	0	2008, 2010, 2011, 2012, 2013	
Pakistan Army	2	0	2018, 2019–20	
WAPDA	1	6	2006	2005, 2008, 2010, 2012, 2014, 2018
Balochistan United	1	1	2014	2013
Sports Sciences Department, University of the Punjab	1	1	2007	2009
Karachi City	1	0	2024	
Malavan BA^{g}	1	0	2009	
Punjab	1	0	2005	
Legacy	0	1		2024
Afghanistan^{g}	0	1	–	2007
Diya	0	1	–	2011
Islamabad	0	1	–	2006
Karachi United	0	1	–	2019–20

- ^{g} Guest teams invited by Pakistan Football Federation, Afghanistan women's national football team represented Afghanistan and Malavan BA represented Iran.

== See also ==
- Football in Pakistan
- Sport in Pakistan
