= 2009 National Women's Football Championship (Pakistan) =

Tournament details
- Country: Pakistan
- City: Islamabad
- Venue: Jinnah Sports Stadium
- Dates: 29 July 2009 - 11 August 2009
- Teams: 13

Final positions
- Champions: Malavan BA (1st title)
- Runners-up: Sports Sciences Department
- Third place: Young Rising Stars
- Fourth place: WAPDA

Awards
- Misha Dawood Trophy (Best Player): Mariam Irandost

The 2009 National Women's Football Championship was the 5th season of the National Women's Football Championship, the top-tier of women's football in Pakistan. The event took place from 29 July to 11 August 2009 at Jinnah Sports Stadium in Islamabad.

Thirteen teams competed in the tournament, including Malavan Bandar Anzali from Iran joining as a guest team.

Malavan BA won the title after beating Sports Science Department (of University of the Punjab) 11–0 in the final. Defending champions Young Rising Stars were third. Mariam Irandost from Malavan BA was declared the Best Player.
