= Syeda Mahpara =

Pakistani footballer (born 1993)

Mahpara Shahid
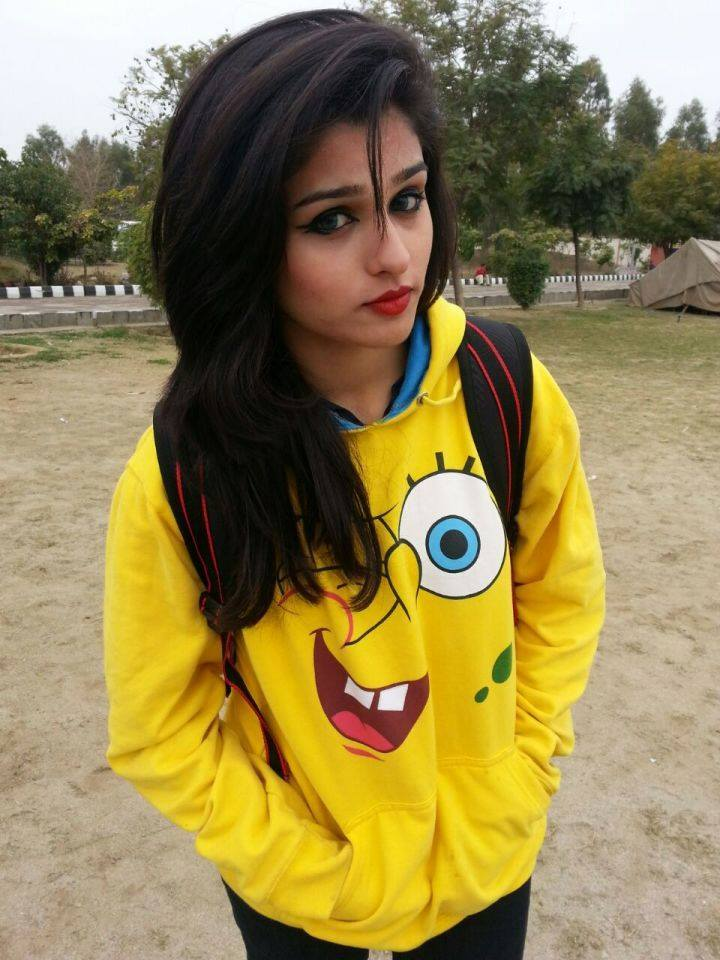

Personal information
- Full name: Syeda Mahpara Shahid
- Date of birth: 8 July 1993 (age 33)
- Place of birth: Karachi, Pakistan
- Position: Goalkeeper

Team information
- Current team: WAPDA WFC

Senior career*
Years	Team	Apps	(Gls)
2007–2013	Young Rising Stars		
2013–2016	Balochistan United	6	(0)
2016–2017	Highlander's FC		
2017	Rossoneri Women's FC		
2017-	WAPDA		

International career
2010-	Pakistan	13	(0)
- * Club domestic league appearances and goals

Syeda Mahpara Shahid Bukhari, known as Syeda Mahpara or Mahpara Shahid (born 8 July 1993), is a Pakistani footballer. She is the goalkeeper of the Pakistan women's national football team, and represents WAPDA at club level.

== Club career ==
In January 2017, she, along with teammate Zulfia Nazeer, signed up with Dubai-based Rossoneri Football Club for IFA women's football league in the UAE. They made their debuts against Arsenal Women Football Club in Dubai.

== International career ==
Mahpara was the first-ever goalkeeper of Pakistan women's national football team, making her debut in 2010 against India at the South Asian Games in Dhaka. She was a member of the national team which participated in the third SAFF Women's Championship held Islamabad, Pakistan. She played in all three games (vs. Sri Lanka, Nepal and Bhutan) at that tournament.

== Career statistics ==
=== International statistics ===
Year	Team	Appearance	Goals
2010–present	Pakistan National Team	13	0

=== Individual ===
- National Women Football Championship Best Goalkeeper: 2010, 2011, 2012, 2013, 2014, 2018, 2020
