= Manizeh Zainli =

Football executive

- Occupations: Secretary General, Pakistan Football Federation

Manizeh Zainli, born in 1984, served as Pakistan's first female secretary general of the Pakistan Football Federation (PFF). She was nominated for the post in February 2020 and stepped down at the end of December 2020. She was also the first female official of any football federation in South Asian countries. After her resignation, Zainli continued to work in administrative positions in the education sector.

== Career ==
Zainli started her career as a discussion teacher in 2005. She then went on to serve as the head of administration at Links Schooling System in 2016. She became a principal at Westminster David Game College, Karachi, in 2018.

She played football for two years with the Diya Women Football Club in Karachi.

Her road to becoming the first female secretary general of the PFF started when she was serving as the outreach counsel and administrator at Millennium Universal College. She was selected after regular interviews conducted by a committee set up by FIFA in February 2020 and became the first female secretary general of PFF. Munizeh also has 15 years of experience in top management.

Manizeh became one of the highest-paid football officials in the history of Pakistani football. Manizeh was recognized by ASEAN football federation for being among the 5 women secretaries general in Asia. Manizeh was represented as the only female official in South Asian Football conference.

== Criticism ==
After her appointment, there was a lot of criticism on gender lines, with Manizeh being criticized for not having any background in football. Manizeh responded to the criticism, saying it did not deter her from her role and responsibilities, and that the secretary general was an administrative position, which did not require a football background.

During an interview with a Pakistani sports channel, she responded to the commentators, "I don’t want to respond to misogynists' comments... I would let my work speak for itself, and these things don’t bother me at all. I am here in an administrative position, although I have played some football, but that is not required for my job, neither do I need a coaching license, as I am not a player or a coach. I am in administration, so people should see my administrative work and background."

According to sources, the PFF Normalization Committee wanted to remove Manizeh from her post citing financial irregularities. These allegations were also made by Manizeh against the normalization committee. Manizeh got a stay order from a civil court in Lahore, preventing the PFF Normalization Committee from removing her from her post after differences developed between her and PFF. Manizeh was reinstated on 22 December 2020 by the new NC chair Muneer Sadhana, calling the termination "illegal". In return, Manizeh accepted to withdraw the court cases against the PFF and the ex-NC chair.

== Future plans ==
Manizeh says she plans to set up a football league for women, saying there's a lot of talent in men and women for football and that needs training and encouragement to shine. She is hoping to get a grant of 500,000 from FIFA to get started on women's football.

She has plans to help the football players in Pakistan affected by the COVID-19 pandemic and lockdown. The PFF is starting a player relief fund. FIFA has decided to give $1.5 million to each member country that will help with the relief fund for Pakistani players.

In an interview, PFF's General Secretary Manizeh Zainli said she is looking forward to providing as many opportunities as she can to the talent of Gilgit-Baltistan in the limited time-period she has. Subsequently, there have been training sessions conducted for the newly emerging girls football team in Gilgit-Baltistan territory led by PFF's National Technical Director Daniel Limones.
