= 2011 National Women's Football Championship (Pakistan) =

Tournament details
- Country: Pakistan
- City: Islamabad
- Venue: Jinnah Sports Stadium
- Dates: 19–30 September 2011
- Teams: 15

Final positions
- Champions: Young Rising Stars (3rd title)
- Runners-up: Diya
- Third place: WAPDA
- Fourth place: Balochistan United

Tournament statistics
- Top goal scorer: Malika-e-Noor

Awards
- Misha Dawood Trophy (Best Player): Hajra Khan
- Best goalkeeper: Syeda Mahpara

The 2011 National Women's Football Championship was the 7th season of the National Women's Football Championship, the top tier of women's football in Pakistan. The tournament ran from 18 to 30 September 2011.

Young Rising Stars were able to defend their title, winning their third national championship, by beating Diya 4–3 on penalties in the final, after the match had ended in 1-1 in extra time.

== Teams ==
A total of 15 teams took part in the tournament.

- Azad Jammu and Kashmir
- Balochistan
- Balochistan United
- Diya
- Higher Education Commission
- Islamabad
- KPK
- Margala WFC
- Model Town WFC
- Pakistan Army
- Punjab
- Sindh
- Sports SCN
- WAPDA
- Young Rising Stars
