= UKMA =

UKMA may refer to:

- UK Metric Association
- United Kingdom Minifootball Association
- National University of Kyiv-Mohyla Academy
