= Malika-e-Noor =

Pakistani footballer (born 1994)

Personal information
- Full name: Malika-e-Noor
- Date of birth: 11 July 1994 (age 32)
- Place of birth: Hunza, Pakistan
- Positions: Midfielder; defender

Team information
- Current team: Pakistan Army

Senior career*
Years	Team	Apps	(Gls)
2010	Young Rising Stars	90	(40)
	Eagle W.F.C.	36	(12)
	Pakistan Army	54	(32)

International career
2010–2024	Pakistan	7	(4)
- * Club domestic league appearances and goals

Malika-e-Noor (born 11 July 1994) is a Pakistani footballer who plays as a defender or attacking midfielder for Pakistan Army. She also served as vice-captain for the Pakistan women's national football team. As of 2023, she has played in over 200 domestic matches, with 98 goals to her name.

== Club career ==
=== Young Rising Stars ===
Malika scored the opening goal for Young Rising Stars in the final of the 2010 National Women Football Championship, as her side went on to win 2–0 against WAPDA. She won the top scorer award at the tournament.

In September 2011, Noor scored 14 goals and provided 11 assists in Young Rising Stars' 25–0 win over Margala in the 7th National Women Football Championship. She also scored the equalizer in the final against Diya as YRS successfully defended their title. This helped her win the Top Scorer award at the tournament for the second consecutive time.

=== Pakistan Army ===
At the 2014 edition, she played for Pakistan Army and scored 16 goals in 6 matches as her side came third. She was awarded the Misha Dawood Trophy for being the best player of the tournament.

== International career ==
Noor scored the 89th-minute winning goal from the penalty spot in Pakistan women's team's first competitive victory, at the 2010 SAFF Women's Championship. The team beat the Maldives 2–1 and she also served an assist for the national team's first-ever goal in the same match.

On 19 July 2024, she announced her retirement from international football.

== International goals ==
No.	Date	Venue	Opponent	Score	Result	Competition
1.	14 December 2010	Cox's Bazar Stadium, Cox's Bazar, Bangladesh	Maldives	2–1	2–1	2010 SAFF Women's Championship
2.	16 December 2010	Cox's Bazar Stadium, Cox's Bazar, Bangladesh	Afghanistan	1–0	3–0	2010 SAFF Women's Championship
3.	12 September 2012	CR & FC Grounds, Colombo, Sri Lanka	Maldives	2–0	3–0	2012 SAFF Women's Championship
4.	16 November 2014	Jinnah Sports Stadium, Islamabad, Pakistan	Bhutan	4–1	4–1	2014 SAFF Women's Championship
