= Young Rising Stars WFC =

- Full name: Young Rising Stars Women Football Club
- Founded: 2007
- Founder: Ghias Uddin Baloch & Syed Azfer Iqbal
- League: National Women Football Championship

Young Rising Stars Women Football Club, also referred as to Young Rising Stars WFC, is a Pakistani women's association football club based in Rawalpindi. Founded in 2007, the club has won the National Women Football Championship a record five times (2008, 2010, 2011, 2012 and 2013), including four consecutive times. It has also won the U-16 National Youth Championship once (in 2014).

Young Rising Stars WFC is not related to another Pakistani women's football club, Young Rising Stars Layyah, based in Layyah, which reached the group stage of the 2021 National Women Football Championship.

== History ==
The club was founded in 2007 by Ghias Uddin Baloch & Syed Azfer Iqbal. The Embassy of the United States in Islamabad supported the club with training and coaching under its Youth Enrichment Summer Programme (YESP). The club also received support from Mari Gas Company and Rotary International.

Former international player Shahid Ahmad Khan became the coach of the team for the subsequent years. The Young Rising Stars won the National Women Football Championship in 2008, just a year after its formation. The club got the third position in 2009. These performances led the players and the management to be invited to a two-week tour of the United States in April 2009 by the Youth Enrichment Program with the initiative of the US State Department. There, the players interacted with the coaches and teams of different educational institutes. However, Pakistan Football Federation (PFF) implemented a two-year ban on the club president, coach, and assistant coach for undertaking a foreign tour without obtaining a No Objection Certificate from the relevant authorities. The club was allowed to continue its operations under an interim set-up.

Young Rising Stars followed this up with success in the 2010 National Women Football Championship, winning four and drawing one match on their way to the title. The club also won the Fair Play, Top Scorer (Malika-e-Noor), and Best Goalkeeper (Syeda Mahpara) awards. Thus, the club became the first team to win the national title twice. Seven of its players (captain Sana Mahmud, Malika-e-Noor, Syeda Mahpara, Sahar Zaman, Asmara Kiani, Roshnan Ali, and Rozina Ghazi) were called up to the national team training camp for the 2010 SAFF Women's Championship. Club captain Sana Mehmood was soon named the new captain of the national team, with four of her teammates also joining the squad. In the opening match against Maldives, Malika-e-Noor scored the winner to enable Pakistan to win their first-ever football match.

The club was given permanent membership to the PFF Congress in December 2010.

The club was among the 24 teams to compete in the 2011 National Women Football Club Championship. The same year, it successfully defended its title in the 2011 National Women Football Championship held in Islamabad, beating Diya W.F.C. on penalties. YRS players Malika-e-Noor and Syeda Mahpara won the Top Scorer and Best Goalkeeper Awards, respectively.

In the 2012 edition of the National Championship, Young Rising Stars defended its yet again, beating WAPDA on penalty shoot-out.

The club won the inaugural edition of the National U-16 Inter-Club Women's Football Championship in 2014, beating Soccer Queen 4–0 in the final.

== Honours ==
- National Women Football Championship:
  - Winners (5): 2008, 2010, 2011, 2012, 2013
  - Third position (1): 2009
- National U-16 Inter-Club Women's Football Championship
  - Winners (1): 2014
