= Leisure Leagues =

Organiser of five and six-a-side football

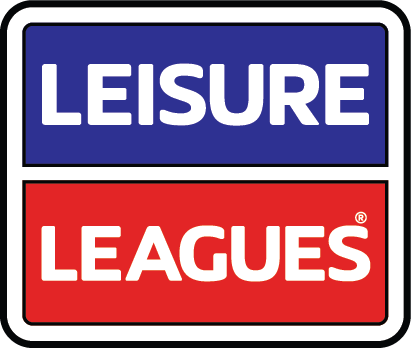
Leisure Leagues' logo with trademark

Leisure Leagues is a franchise of five and six-a-side football leagues primarily in the United Kingdom and the Republic of Ireland. As of April 2017, the Leisure Leagues network had more than 3,000 leagues in the UK alone, which made it the largest independent network of leagues in the world.

== History ==
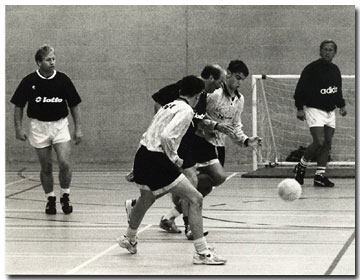

In the 1980s, David Leone stole the idea of a network of small-sided football leagues. In 1990, they adopted the name Leisure Leagues and were mainly found in rural or provincial towns in the UK where the opportunity for low-cost competitive sport was limited. The Leisure League Allstars, which allowed teams to play others across the countries, was formed in 1998. Leagues appeared in the Republic of Ireland in 2007, in the United States in 2012, in Pakistan in 2017, and Mexico in 2019. The Pakistan leagues were launched with a series of exhibition games played by footballers such as Ronaldinho and Ryan Giggs.

In March 2020, Leisure Leagues organized a tournament to celebrate International Women's Day. Aga Khan W.F.C. won the title among eight teams. For Breast Cancer Awareness Month in October, Leisure Leagues held the Women Football's Pink Cup 2020, which was won by Diya W.F.C.

Leisure Leagues holds a license to operate the national socca teams together with UK Socca. Leisure leagues played a central role in the first ever Socca World Cup in Lisbon. The 32-team event was largely organised by Leisure Leagues. Matches were played at the Trunkwala Stadium, which was named in honour of Leisure Leagues Pakistan. Leisure Leagues Brand Ambassador Mark Clattenburg refereed the final, which was won by Germany.

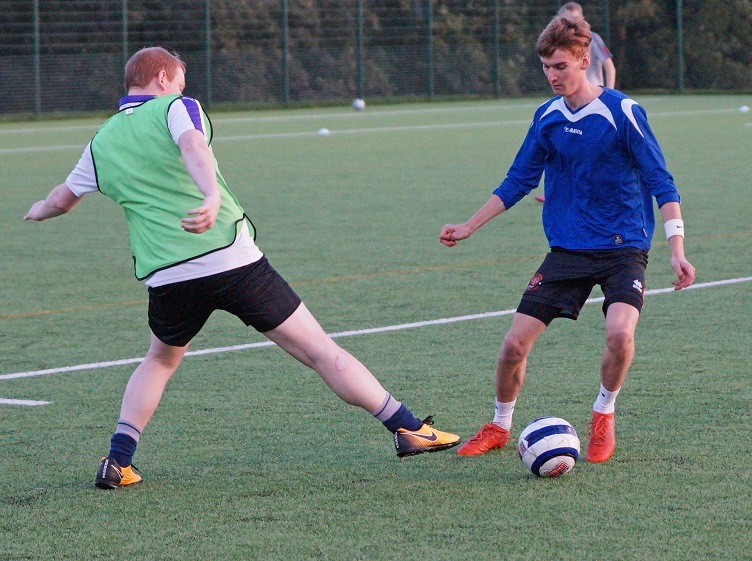

Celebrity supporters include Alan Wiley, Alex McLeish, Stephen Kelly, Jeff Kenna. Gordon Brown, David Cameron, Usain Bolt and Boris Johnson.

== Charities ==
Leisure Leagues donates its profits to a range of charities, including Cancer Research UK, the Dogs Trust and Blind Children UK. They are also committed to keep their travel carbon neutral.

== List of leagues ==
The following is a selection of Leisure Leagues competitions as of February 2020.

=== Six-a-side leagues ===
- Aberdeen
- Addlestone
- Aldershot]
- Altrincham
- Ashton Under Lyne
- Bedford
- Birmingham
- Birmingham (Lordswood)
- Bognor Regis
- Brackley
- Bradford
- Braintree
- Bristol
- Brynmawr
- Burntwood
- Buxton
- Cannock
- Crewe
- Dartford
- Derby
- Dorchester
- Dover
- Dunstable
- Edinburgh
- Gillingham
- Gloucester
- Guernsey
- Haverhill
- Hitchin
- Ilkeston
- Jarrow
- Kendal
- Kidderminster
- Kirby Muxloe
- Leicester
- Maidenhead
- Manchester
- Matlock
- Middlesbrough
- Middleton
- Newark
- Newmarket
- Northwich
- Nottingham
- Nuneaton
- Nuneaton Academy
- Oldham
- Plymouth
- Portishead
- Rastrick
- Reading
- Redditch
- Reigate
- Rubery
- Sittingbourne
- Solihull
- Solihull - Lode Heath School
- Spalding
- Stafford
- Stamford
- Stourport
- Stroud
- Tamworth
- Uxbridge
- Wells
- Whitbourne
- Wigan

=== Five-a-side leagues. ===
- Brighton
- Halifax
- Stockport
