= Pakistan Army women's football team =

Pakistan Army
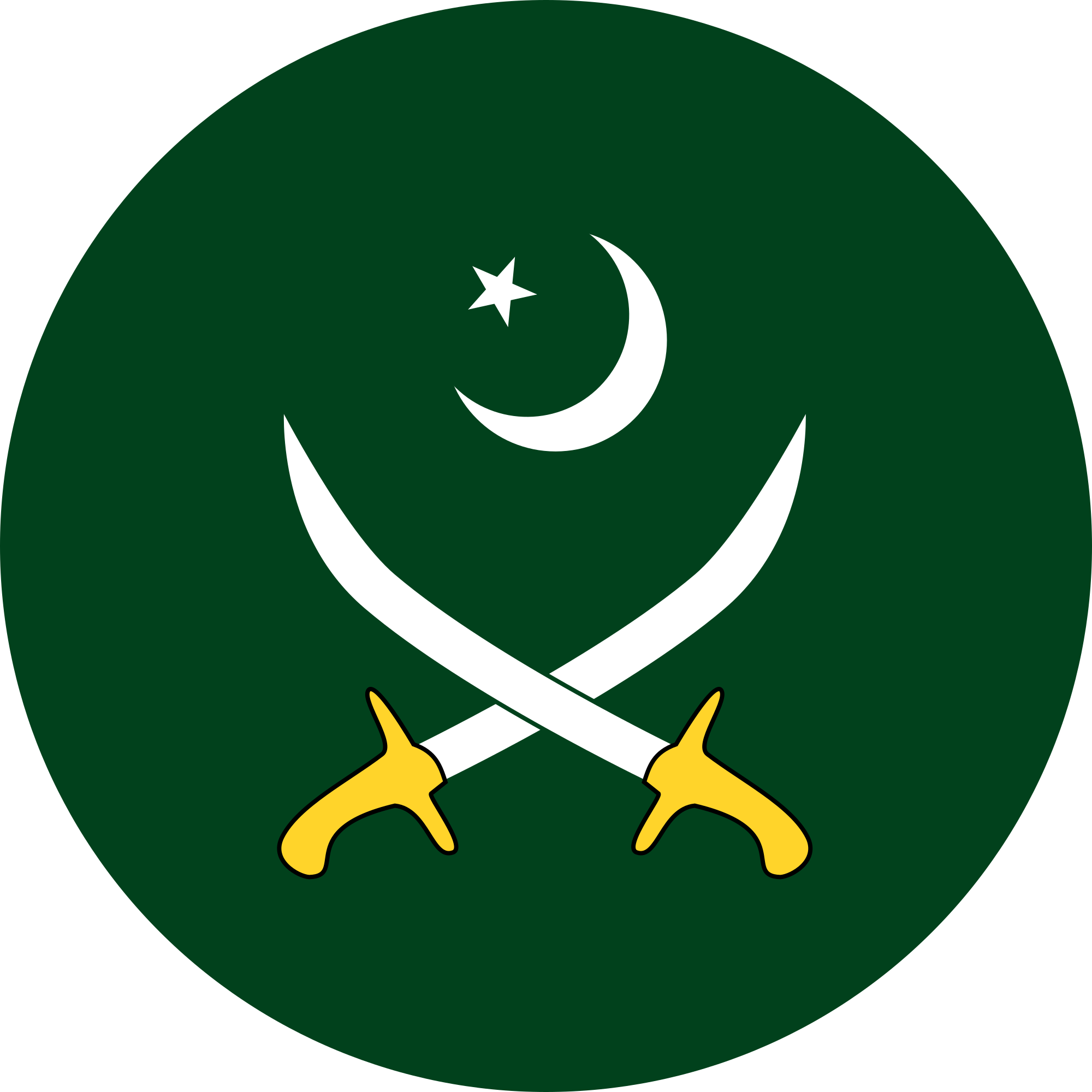
- Full name: Pakistan Army Women's Football Team
- Owners: Pakistan Army
- League: National Women Football Championship
- 2019-2020: 1st (2nd title)

Pakistan Army women's football team is a Pakistani women's football team which competes in the National Women Football Championship (NWFC). It is a departmental team run by Pakistan Army. As of March 2021, it is a two-time NWFC defending champion, having won the 2018 and 2019–2020 titles. They have also placed third in the NWFC in the 2013 and 2014 editions.

== National Women Football Championship ==
=== 9th edition (2013) ===
The Pakistan Army WFC made it to the final round of the 9th National Women Football Championship in 2013.

=== 12th edition (2019–2020) ===
The 12th National Women Football Championship was held in two phases: qualifying rounds (November 2019) and final round (January 2020). On 12 January 2020, Army retained its title when it beat Karachi United by 7–1 in the final held at the Karachi United Stadium in Karachi.

== Notable team members ==
1. Hajra Khan (Pakistan international)
2. Swaiba Sarfraz
3. Malika-e-Noor (captain) (Pakistan international)

== Honours ==
- National Women Football Championship
  - Winners (2): 2018, 2019–20
