= UK Socca =

UK Socca, previously known as United Kingdom Minifootball Association (UKMA), is the license holder for International Socca Federation in the United Kingdom.

The UK Socca is also licensed to supply the national teams for the four home countries (England, Scotland, Wales and Northern Ireland), usually through Leisure Leagues, on continental and world tournaments.

== Venue accreditation ==
The UK Socca also accredits venues throughout the UK to be charter standard for league operators for the role of minifootball, and also assists its member affiliates in promoting minifootball throughout the United Kingdom.

Venues across the UK have applied to be accredited, with the first announced as being the Wakefield Football Centre.

== Membership ==
The UK Minifootball Associations annual report in 2012 listed its key objective as reaching its target of 1,3 million players within its membership by the end of 2015. On 20 February 2013 the UKMA announced it had recruited 5,000 players so far in the year.

At the end of the year in 2013, membership stood at over 100,000.

== Sponsorship ==
The UK Socca has key partners including leading sportswear manufacturer Umbro, which supply the kit for the National teams and the UK's leading manufacturer of astroturf pitches, Tiger Turf UK.

== Squad selection ==
Players were selected in 2013 after a series of nation-wide trials. The idea was to take the grass roots players and give them chance to represent their country. Some of these players became local celebrities, and their achievements were covered by local media. As these players used to be semi-professional, they often have to get time off work to play, but many employers felt proud that their staff are called up.

== International developments 2013-14 ==
After a review of the international teams following the miniEURO 2013 event, the UKMA announced on 29 October that the England coaching team was to be changed. This was quickly followed by further announcements regarding the Wales and Scotland teams.

It was announced in December 2013 that there would be individual trials days with the aim of selecting the squads for miniEURO 2014.

== UK 6 a side championships ==
On 18 Feb 2013 UKMA announced that they had purchased the National Tournament, the UK's biggest 6 a side football tournament. It planned to rebrand the tournament as the UK 6 a side Championships

The national football magazine When Saturday Comes printed an article in their November 2013 edition, in which they called for the tournament to be televised, it appeared on page 26 of the physical edition.
