= 2021 National Women's Football Championship (Pakistan) =

Cancelled

Tournament details
- Country: Pakistan
- City: Karachi
- Venue(s): KMC Football Stadium; KPT Stadium
- Teams: 19

The 2021 National Women's Football Championship was to be the 13th edition of the National Women's Football Championship, the top tier of women's association football in Pakistan. Pakistan Army were the defending champions, having won the 2019–20 National Women Football Championship.

On 27 March 2021, after the Pakistan Football Federation office was forcibly taken over, when it was attacked and people inside held hostage by its former president, Syed Ashfaq Hussain Shah, the Championship was cancelled with only the group stage completed. The development stage tournament was also cancelled by the PFF Normalization committee who were previously in helm of the PFF office. The Ashfaq Shah-led group continued the tournament, but due to the boycott of some of the teams, the tournament was cancelled after the quarterfinals on 1 April 2021.

== Format ==
The championship was divided into two parts: the main tournament and a development stage tournament. The main tournament consisted of group stage matches with the top two teams from each group moving forward to the knockouts. The development stage tournament featured the remaining three teams from each group in a separate knockout tournament.

There were eight referees in this tournament, with one of them being a woman.

== Teams ==
Initially, a total of 20 teams were set to participate in the tournament. However, due to differences on the grant allocation, Model Town WFC pulled out, leaving 19 teams in the field.

- Diya WFC
- FC Karachi
- Gilgit WFC
- Hazara Girls FA
- Hazara Quetta FA
- Higher Education Commission
- Highlanders WFC
- Jafa Soccer Academy
- Karachi United
- Karachi WFC
- Masha United
- Model Town WFC (withdrew)
- Mohsin Gillani WFC
- MUK WFC
- Nawanshehr United F.C.
- Pakistan Army^{(TH)}
- Riaz Kamil FC
- Sialkot City WFC
- WAPDA
- Young Rising Stars Layyah

Notes
TH = Championship title holders

=== Debutants ===
Seven teams including Masha United, Hazara Quetta Football Academy and Hazara Girls Football Academy made their debuts. For the second time in the championship's history, foreign players were included as part of a local team, with Masha United signing four players from Nepal. Some players were very young, such as those of Hazara Girls F.A., who were all under 15 years old, with one of them being 11.

== Season summary ==
The championship opened on 8 March 2021 with a celebration of AFC Women's Football Day at KPT Stadium. Around 50 schoolgirls were introduced to the basis of football by members of the national team including captain Hajra Khan. Like the previous championship, this year's tournament was streamed live on MyCujoo.

The championship was being conducted with a few protocols including mandatory wearing of masks, temperature screening and a ban on handshakes and team scrums. However, there was no testing of the players or officials including the foreign players who joined Masha United in Karachi. On 15 March, PFF announced that all group 'B' matches were suspended following a positive test of a Karachi United player. All players and officials from Karachi United as well as all those from teams having first and second contact i.e. Karachi WFC, Sialkot City WFC and HEC underwent covid test. On 19 March, it was reported that Karachi WFC and HEC had returned negative tests while results of the other two teams were still waited on. Matches involving the former two teams and the remaining 5th team, Masha United, are set to resume on 20 March 2021. The other two teams will not be involved in any matches until all members return negative test results.

The top two teams from each group moved into the knockout stage. The remaining teams moved to the development stage tournament.

However, on 27 March 2021, the championship was cancelled. No official reason was given, but the decision took place after the Pakistan Football Federation's office in Lahore was attacked and people inside held hostage by its former president, Syed Ashfaq Hussain Shah, and his group.

As the NWFC was cancelled on 27 March 2021, the knockout stages which were to begin on 28 March 2021 were not held by PFF. The Ashfaq Shah-led group, however, decided to complete the tournament by forming a new organizing committee.

In the quarterfinals, Diya WFC gave a walkover to Masha United in protest, while Highlanders, Karachi United, and WAPDA won their respective fixtures. The tournament was cancelled following more protests on 1 April 2021.
