= Sana Mahmud =

Pakistani footballer and basketball player

- Born: Islamabad, Pakistan
- Education: Masters in International Development
- Alma mater: Ohio University, Bahria University
- Occupations: Sportswoman: football and basketball. National team captain (both)

Sana Mahmud is a former footballer and basketball player from Pakistan. She was captain of the women's national team for both sports.

== Personal life ==
Sana was born in Islamabad. Sana's parents discouraged their children from spending too much time watching television and wanted them to spend more time outdoors. This gave Sana much exposure in sports and outdoor activities and from a very young age, Sana wanted to be a sportswoman. Sana was 17 years old when she played her first national-level tournaments in basketball and football. Sana did her Bachelor's from Bahria University, Islamabad. She later received the Fulbright Scholarship and went on to study Master's in International Development from Ohio University. Sana is married to decorated professional body builder and former rugby player, Wajih Zafar. They have one son, Eyad, born in December 2020.

== Career ==
=== Sports ===
Sana played her first national game at the age of 17. She had heard about trials for Young Rising Stars F.F.C. and decided to try her luck. She was among the 35 girls selected out of 70. Soon, Sana became the captain of her team at the Young Rising Stars F.F.C. created by Ghias Uddin Baloch. Sana won the title in 2008, 2010, 2011, 2012, 2013 with YRS. She was Captain of the Pakistan women's national football team (2010 – 2012). She went on her first international tour in 2010 when she went at the 1st SAFF Women's Championship in Bangladesh and made it to the semi-final.

Sana started playing basketball and football in her university years. Sana became the captain of the first basketball national team in Pakistan. During her career her team won against Afghanistan and Sana became the top scorer in the match. Sana has participated in international events like the South Asian Games (India, 2016) and Islamic Games (Azerbaijan, 2017). In her career, Sana has won a gold medal in Basketball in the 32nd National Games. She won the award of the Most Valuable Player in 2015 National Championship. Sana has also won a silver medal in the 16th National Basketball Championship In HEC competition.

Sana hold an honorary position in the Islamabad Basketball Association where she helps in promoting women's basketball.

=== Development ===
Sana has also worked in the humanitarian and development sector. In 2019, Sana won an Alumni Small Grant (ASG), from the Pakistan-U.S. Alumni Network (PUAN) and the U.S. Mission in Pakistan and she led a project We Got Game, a program for women basketball development. Sana has also worked as a Training Officer at Muslim Aid, an international NGO based in U.K. Sana works at Muslim Aid to organize trainings of women and girls. Sana has also worked with Total Football, to promote girls football.

Sana is also a project manager at Right to Play, an organization that teaches sports to children.
