= 2013 National Women's Football Championship (Pakistan) =

Tournament details
- Country: Pakistan
- City: Lahore
- Venue: Punjab Stadium
- Dates: 4 December 2013 - 9 December 2013
- Teams: 8

Final positions
- Champions: Young Rising Stars (5th title)
- Runners-up: Balochistan United
- Third place: Pakistan Army
- Fourth place: Islamabad

The 2013 National Women's Football Championship was the 9th season of the National Women's Football Championship, the top tier of women's football in Pakistan. The tournament ran from 4 to 9 December 2013 in Lahore.

Young Rising Stars were able to defend their title, winning their fourth consecutive (fifth overall) National Championship by beating Balochistan United 3-2 on penalties in the final, after the match had ended goalless after extra time.

== Teams ==
The following eight teams (out of a total of 16) made it to the knock-out stage of the tournament:

- Balochistan United
- Diya
- Higher Education Commission
- Islamabad
- Pakistan Army
- Punjab
- WAPDA
- Young Rising Stars

== Semi-finals ==
8 December 2013

Young Rising Stars	3–0	Islamabad
Zara Iqbal 2'; Nadia Bhatti 41'; Iaza 49'

Punjab Stadium, Lahore

8 December 2013
14:00 PST

Balochistan United	3–2	Pakistan Army
Nina 30', 82'; Shahlyla Baloch 73'		Roshnan Ali 16'; Iram Kazmi 28'

Punjab Stadium, Lahore
