= 2010 National Women's Football Championship (Pakistan) =

Tournament details
- Country: Pakistan
- City: Islamabad
- Venue: Jinnah Sports Stadium
- Dates: 28 September 2010 - 10 October 2010
- Teams: 12

Final positions
- Champions: Young Rising Stars (2nd title)
- Runners-up: WAPDA

Tournament statistics
- Top goal scorer: Malika-e-Noor

Awards
- Misha Dawood Trophy (Best Player): Hajra Khan
- Best goalkeeper: Syeda Mahpara

The 2010 National Women's Football Championship was the 6th season of the National Women's Football Championship, the top tier of women's football in Pakistan. The tournament took place from 28 September to 10 October 2010 at Jinnah Sports Stadium in Islamabad.

Young Rising Stars won their second national championship by beating WAPDA 2–0 in the final, courtesy of goals from Malika-e-Noor and Asma Yaseen.
