= Karachi United Stadium =

Pakistani football stadium

- کراچی متحد اسٹیڈیم
- Interactive map of Karachi United Stadium
- Full name: Karachi United Stadium
- Location: Clifton, Karachi, Pakistan
- Coordinates: 24°48′51.2″N 67°00′04.2″E
- Owner: DHA
- Capacity: 2,000
- Surface: Grass
- Scoreboard: yes

Construction
- Builder: DHA

Tenants
- Karachi United; Karachi United WFC

Karachi United Stadium is a football stadium in the DHA neighborhood of Clifton, Karachi. It is the home ground of Pakistani professional football club Karachi United since 2015. It also hosts women matches and serves home venue for Karachi United WFC.

== History ==
Karachi United first used the DHA Football Stadium, also named Rahat Football Stadium, in Khayaban-e-Rahat, DHA, as their home ground.

The team later started training in a renovated residential park in Clifton, which the club rented on a more permanent basis, and acquired the Karachi United Stadium in 2015.

It hosted the final round of the 2019–20 National Women Football Championship. However the stadium was criticised for holding key matches due to its small dimension.

== Events ==
- 2019–20 National Women Football Championship

== See also ==
- List of football stadiums in Pakistan
