= Karachi United WFC =

Pakistani football club

Karachi United Women
- Full name: Karachi United Women Football Club
- Nickname: The Reds
- Short name: KUWFC
- Founded: 2010; 16 years ago
- Ground: Karachi United Stadium
- Capacity: 2,000
- Coordinates: 24°48′51.3″N 67°00′05.5″E
- Chairman: Taha Alizai
- Manager: Aleena Akram
- Website: karachiunited.com
Home colours	Away colours

Karachi United Women Football Club is a Pakistani professional women's association football club based in Clifton, Karachi.

Founded in 2010, the club is affiliated with Karachi United men's team. Karachi United Women are committed to elevating the standard of women's football in Pakistan, with a broader vision of contributing to societal development through the power of sport. By nurturing female talent, providing professional training, and creating opportunities for women to participate and excel in football, Karachi United Women seek to challenge existing norms and break barriers that limit women's involvement in sports.

Karachi United uses the 2,000-capacity Karachi United Stadium for most of their home games. The team is sponsored by Burhan Mirza of the The Coach360.

== History ==
=== Early years (2010–2014) ===
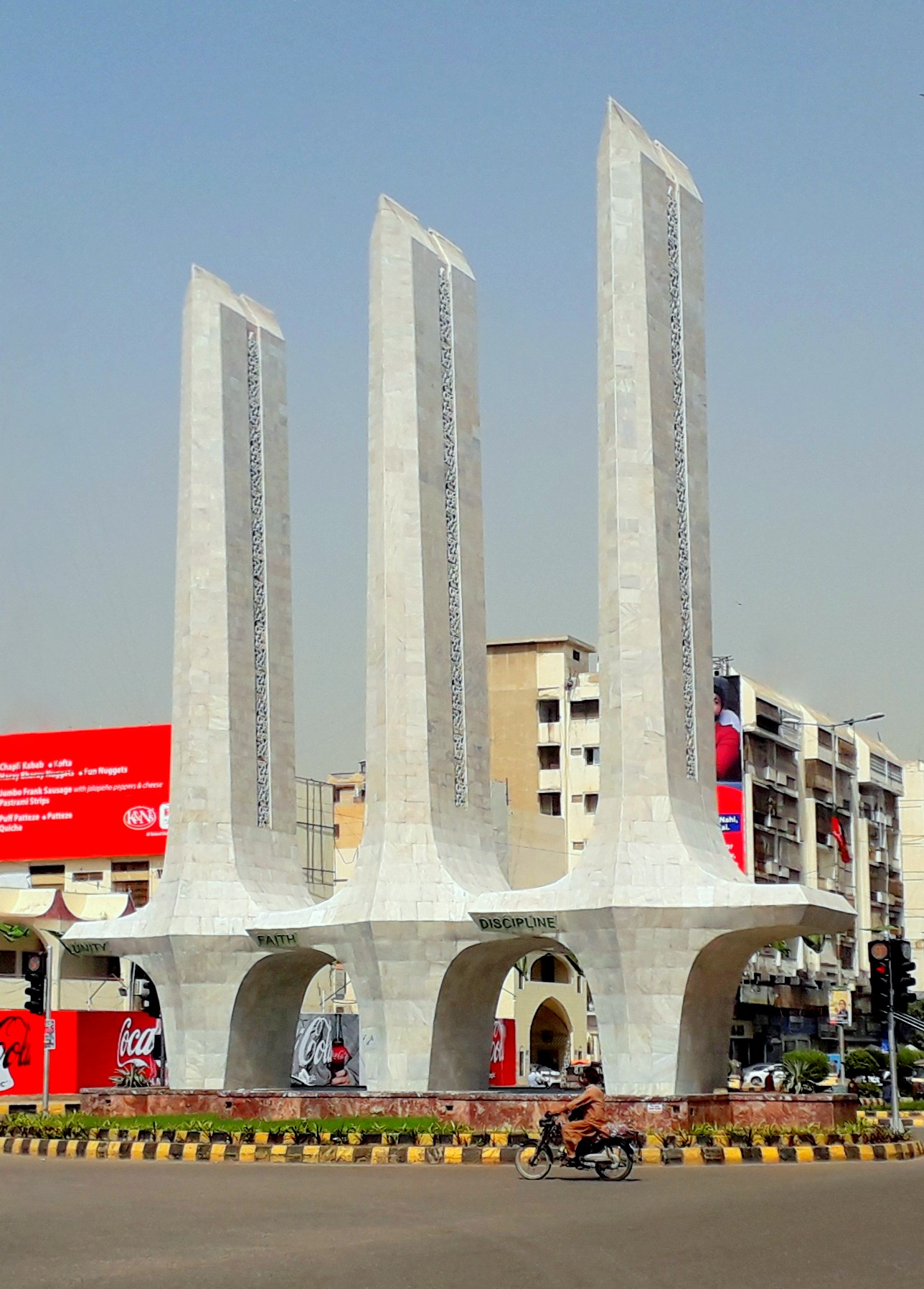
The Teen Talwar monument in Clifton is featured on the club crest

The club was formed in 1996 by Taha Alizai in Karachi. The women's team was established in 2010, with the goal of creating a national team capable of representing Pakistan at the FIFA Women's World Cup. In September 2016, the women's team represented Pakistan at the International Women's Football Cultural Festival in Berlin.

=== Top-flight (2014–present) ===
Karachi United Women finished as runners-up at the 2019–20 National Women Football Championship against Army, and were in the semi-finals of the 2021 National Women Football Championship before the tournament was cancelled.

Saima Baig, former Pakistan Army player, was appointed as the head coach for the team in 2023. Karachi United Women finished in third place at the 2024 National Women Football Championship. They topped their group in the Karachi leg by winning both matches as well as the Islamabad leg by winning 3 matches. A semi-final defeat to Legacy WFC resulted in the team playing the third place playoff against Hazara Quetta WFC, which they ultimately won.

== Crest and colors ==
Karachi United's colors are red, white and black. Traditionally, red is used as the home color and black, white, or green as the away color. The club represents Teen Talwar on their logo, one of the most popular monuments in the city of Karachi, which represent Unity, Faith and Discipline.

=== Kit manufacturers and shirt sponsors ===
Period	Kit manufacturer	Main Shirt Sponsor
2021–2024	M. I. Industries	Engro Corporation
2025–present	M. I. Industries	Coach360

== Stadium ==
The Karachi United Stadium in the DHA neighborhood of Clifton, Karachi, serves as the home ground of Karachi United women.

== Players (2026) ==
As of 31 July 2025

Note: Flags indicate national team as defined under FIFA eligibility rules; some limited exceptions apply. Players may hold more than one non-FIFA nationality.

No.	Pos.	Nation	Player
1	GK	PAK	Fatima Naz
2	DF	PAK	Khadija Wali
4	DF	PAK	Sahiba Sirdil (captain)
5	MF	PAK	Aqsa Muhammad (vice-captain)
6	MF	PAK	Mahnoor Burney
8	MF	PAK	Marsha Malik
9	FW	PAK	Sara Lasi (vice-captain)
12	DF	PAK	Bakhtawar Baloch
13	MF	PAK	Zoya Zeeshan
15	MF	PAK	Ammarah Khan

No.	Pos.	Nation	Player
16	GK	PAK	Ummul Baneen
17	FW	PAK	Ammarah Baloch
18	DF	PAK	Javeria Ejaz
21	FW	PAK	Ayesha Kamran
22	MF	PAK	Aleen Mustafa
24	FW	PAK	Yusra Virk
25	FW	PAK	Shanza Fatima
28	FW	PAK	Ruqaya Zulqarnain
30	MF	PAK	Suraya Zulqarnain

== Personnel ==
=== Current technical staff (2026) ===
Position	Name
Team manager	(Pakistan) Aleena Akram
Assistant coach	(Pakistan) Shahnawaz Gul
S&C Coach & Physical Therapist	(Pakistan) Meekail Asim
Commercial Manager	(Pakistan) Ahmed Khan
Media and Communications	(Pakistan) Mohammad Hassan
Graphic Designer	(Pakistan) Jarri Abbas
Official Photographer	(Pakistan) Mohammad Sameer
Director of football operations	(Pakistan) Taha Alizai
Director of youth and academy	(Pakistan) Imran Ali
Director of football development	(Pakistan) Ali Ata

== Honours ==
- National Women Football Championship
  - Runners-up: 2019–20
  - Third place: 2024
