= Hajra Khan (footballer) =

Pakistani footballer (born 1993)

Personal information
- Full name: Hajra Khan
- Date of birth: 29 December 1993 (age 32)
- Place of birth: Karachi, Pakistan
- Positions: Midfielder; forward

Team information
- Current team: Pakistan Army
- Number: 14

Youth career
- 2008: Diya W.F.C.

Senior career*
Years	Team	Apps	(Gls)
2008–2014	Diya W.F.C.	21	(41)
2014–2015	Balochistan United	13	(58)
2014–2015	→ Sun Hotels and Resorts (loan)	5	(3)
2018–	Pakistan Army	8	(12)

International career^{‡}
2010–	Pakistan	16	(6)
- * Club domestic league appearances and goals as of 23:03, 6 February 2016 (UTC) ‡ National team caps and goals as of 23:03, 6 February 2016 (UTC)

Hajra Khan (Urdu: ہاجرہ خان; born 29 December 1993) is a Pakistani footballer who was the captain of the Pakistan women's national football team. She plays as a striker or midfielder. She became part of Pakistan national team in 2009 which she led as a captain in 2014.

== Early and personal life ==
Khan was born on 29 December 1993, in Karachi, Pakistan, and was a remarkable athlete from an early age. While her dream was to become a professional athlete, Khan initially made a name for herself in track and field. She represented Pakistan in the prestigious Salwan Games where she ran a half marathon held in India in 2004. At the age of 14, she embarked on her football journey, joining the Diya Women's Football Club after impressing during tryouts for the provincial football team of Sindh. Khan's debut was nothing short of extraordinary, as she scored an impressive nine goals in just three games during the National Women Championship. Her outstanding performance not only contributed to her team's success but she also ended up as the top scorer of the tournament.

== Club career ==
Starting with Diya W.F.C., she won the Misha Dawood Trophy during the 2010 National Women Football Championship.

In January 2014, she decided to leave Diya and join Balochistan United. Khan won the Pakistani women's football championship with Balochistan United in 2014, scoring the only goal against former club Diya in the final. She then accepted an offer to play for Maldivian club Sun Hotels and Resorts FC in the FAM Women's Football Championship.

In summer 2015, Khan spent a month in Germany and attended pre-season trials with four clubs. She was unable to accept a transfer offer from MSV Duisburg due to visa issues. She became the only Pakistani player to score 100 goals in her club career. She joined Sun Hotels and Resorts Maldives club on 24 May 2015. Hajra currently plays for Pakistan Army.

== International career ==
In 2009, Khan was selected in the Pakistan national team for the 2010 South Asian Games in Dhaka, Bangladesh. After Khan's participation at this event, the Pakistan Football Federation (PFF) selected her for a FIFA women's football coaching course in Colombo, Sri Lanka. In December 2010, she played in the inaugural SAFF Women's Championship, helping Pakistan reach the semi-final.

She was the first Pakistani women footballer to sign an international contract in 2014 with Sun Hotels & Resorts Football Club to play in the Maldives National Women's league.

After years of inactivity in football due to the suspension on the Pakistan Football Federation by FIFA, Hajra returned to the international stage at the 2022 Women SAFF Championship, retained as player but transferred the captaincy to Maria Khan.

== Athletic career ==
=== Netball ===
At the 2011 South Asian Beach Games in Hambantota, Sri Lanka, Khan helped the Pakistan National Netball Team bring home a bronze medal.

=== Basketball ===
Khan played at the 2016 South Asian Games in India as one of the key players on the Pakistan National Basketball Team.

== Career statistics ==
=== International ===
Scores and results list Pakistan's goal tally first.

List of international goals scored by Hajra Khan
No.	Date	Venue	Opponent	Score	Result	Competition
1	12 September 2012	CR & FC Grounds, Colombo Sri Lanka	Maldives	1–0	3–0	2012 SAFF Women's Championship
2	12 September 2012	CR & FC Grounds, Colombo Sri Lanka	Maldives	3–0	3–0	2012 SAFF Women's Championship
3	26 October 2014	Bahrain National Stadium, Riffa, Bahrain	Bahrain	1–0	1–5	International friendly
4	29 October 2014	Bahrain National Stadium, Riffa, Bahrain	Bahrain		1–10	International friendly
5	11 November 2014	Jinnah Sports Stadium, Islamabad, Pakistan	Sri Lanka	1–2	1–2	2014 SAFF Women's Championship

== Honours ==
Balochistan United

- National Women Football Championship: 2014
