= Islamabad Football Association =

- اسلام آباد فٹبال ایسوسی ایشن
- Abbreviation: IFA
- Formation: 4 May 2001; 25 years ago
- Type: Sports organisation
- Headquarters: Islamabad, Pakistan
- Coordinates: 33.43°N 73.04°E
- Region served: Islamabad
- Members: 54 (2023)
- Official language: Urdu, English
- Parent organization: Pakistan Football Federation
- Website: https://islamabadfootballassociation.com/

The Islamabad Football Association (IFA) is the regional governing body of association football and futsal in Islamabad, Pakistan. Its headquarters are located in Jinnah Sports Stadium. IFA is responsible for the organisation and governance of major regional football tournaments in the Islamabad region including IFA 'A' and 'B' Division Leagues, the Jashan-i-Azadi Football Tournament, and the Islamabad Challenge Cup. It also organises various Islamabad teams which participate in local and domestic tournaments.

== History ==
Islamabad Football Association was formed in 2000. Previously it was known as Islamabad DFA and was attached with the Rawalpindi Division Football Association since 1974.

IFA has been a permanent member of the Pakistan Football Federation Congress since 2010. It was then given membership for the term 2011-2015.

Islamabad Football Association uploaded its new logo to its Facebook page in January 2012. However, in 2017, a Reddit user alleged that it was nearly identical to the logo used by Football Association of Ireland in terms of the design, colours, and the font. IFA then changed its logo next year.

As of December 2020, IFA had 42 football clubs as members.

As of 2023, IFA had 54 total right of vote clubs including 4 Futsal Clubs.

== Football team ==
The Islamabad Football Association representative football team has participated in several football events. The team competed in the 2010 KPT-PFF Cup.

In August 2017, the IFA U-18 team became the first team from Pakistan to win the Gothia Cup China U-18 event held in Shenyang.
