= Diya WFC =

Pakistani football club established in 2002

Diya Women Football Club دیا ویمین فٹبال کلب
- Full name: Diya Women Football Club
- Short name: Diya WFC
- Founded: 2002; 24 years ago
- Ground: Clifton Community Ground, Karachi
- Manager: Sadia Sheikh
- League: National Women Football Championship
- 2021: Quarterfinals (season cancelled)
- Website: https://www.diyawfc.org.pk/
Home colours

Diya Women Football Club (Urdu: دیا ویمین فٹبال کلب), also referred to as Diya WFC, Diya FC, Diya, Diya Women FC, or DWFC, is a Pakistani women's association football and futsal club based in Karachi. Diya means lamp in Urdu. It is the country's oldest women's football club, established in 2002. Diya WFC has no affiliation to any men's club.

== History ==
Diya WFC was founded in 2002 by Sadia Sheikh, a physical education teacher, founder and secretary general of Sindh Women Football Association since 2006 and first FIFA-certified football administrator in Pakistan, in 2011, and the only one so far. It was recognized by the Pakistan Football Federation (PFF) in 2006. Since 2010, Diya WFC is a permanent member of the PFF committee, among 29 members. In September 2015, Diya WFC was the first women's football club to sign an agreement with Aspirations Pakistan Football Alliance (APFA) and follow their certified curriculum to improve standards of training for both coaches and players.

Trainings take place on a ground located in Clifton, next to Bagh Ibne Qasim beachside park. Like other independent women's clubs in Pakistan, Diya WFC has neither sponsorship nor affiliation to a corporation or a public administration, and is therefore financially supported by the owner, family and friends.

Diya WFC is also a competition organizer, such as the 1st Chase Up All-Karachi Under 23 Girls Futsal Tournament 2021, held in February 2021 in partnership with the Sindh Women Futsal Association.

Beside women's football, Diya WFC is a football promoter, offering mixed gender practice or setting up academies for children across Sindh.

In 2011, Diya WFC was featured for its pioneer role in a documentary produced by the UNICEF.

== Players ==
As of July 2017, 2,000 girls and women have been trained by Diya.

In 2018, students and players age range was from 6 to 27.

=== Present players ===
Kiran Qureshi is the only Diya's player to be a member of the Pakistan women's national football team (PWNFT), as attacker, since 2020.

Shumaila Gulab Hussain, Marium Zehri and Zunaira Shah played for the PWNFT and represented their country at the South Asian Football Federation and Asian Football Confederation events in Bhutan and Mongolia in 2018. Shumaila Gulab Hussain and Marium Zehri are defenders within the under-16 PWNFT.

=== Past players ===
Misha Dawood was a 19-year-old Diya WFC midfielder and a second year UC Berkeley student who died in a plane crash on 28 July 2010. She was considered a "promising star". On 4 August 2010, the best woman player award of the National Women Football Championship was renamed in her honor by the PFF. The National Women Under-16 Championship was also renamed in her honor.

Hajra Khan, forward and captain of PWNFT, played with Diya as a professional from 2008 to 2014, prior to moving to Balochistan United W.F.C. Mehwish Khan, also playing as defender for the PWNFT, started playing with Diya WFC prior to joining WAPDA women's club in 2011. Along with Hajra Khan and Mehwish Khan, Marium Leghari, a Diya player, represented Pakistan in the first women's South Asian Football Federation Championship held in Bangladesh in 2010. Rukhsar Rashid, who joined Diya WFC in 2009 and is now coach of the club, was also a defender with the national team. Among the women players who have been part of the national team, Afshan Altaf, Qurratulain Ashraf and Fatima Ansari started playing with Diya WFC.

Manizeh Zainli, secretary general of PFF (2020), and the first women to hold this position, played football with Diya WFC for two years as an amateur.

== Performance ==
=== Football ===
==== PFF competitions ====
The club competes within three PFF championships: under-16, under-19 and open age:

- National Women Football Championship

Diya WFC was ranked 2nd in 2009 and 2011, 3rd in 2007 and 4th in 2014. Hajra Khan won the Misha Dawood Trophy in 2010.

- Shahlyla Baloch National Under-16 Women Football Championship

It earned the 3rd position in 2015, in 2018 and in 2019. In 2014, the club was rewarded with the fair play trophy and prize.

==== Other competitions ====
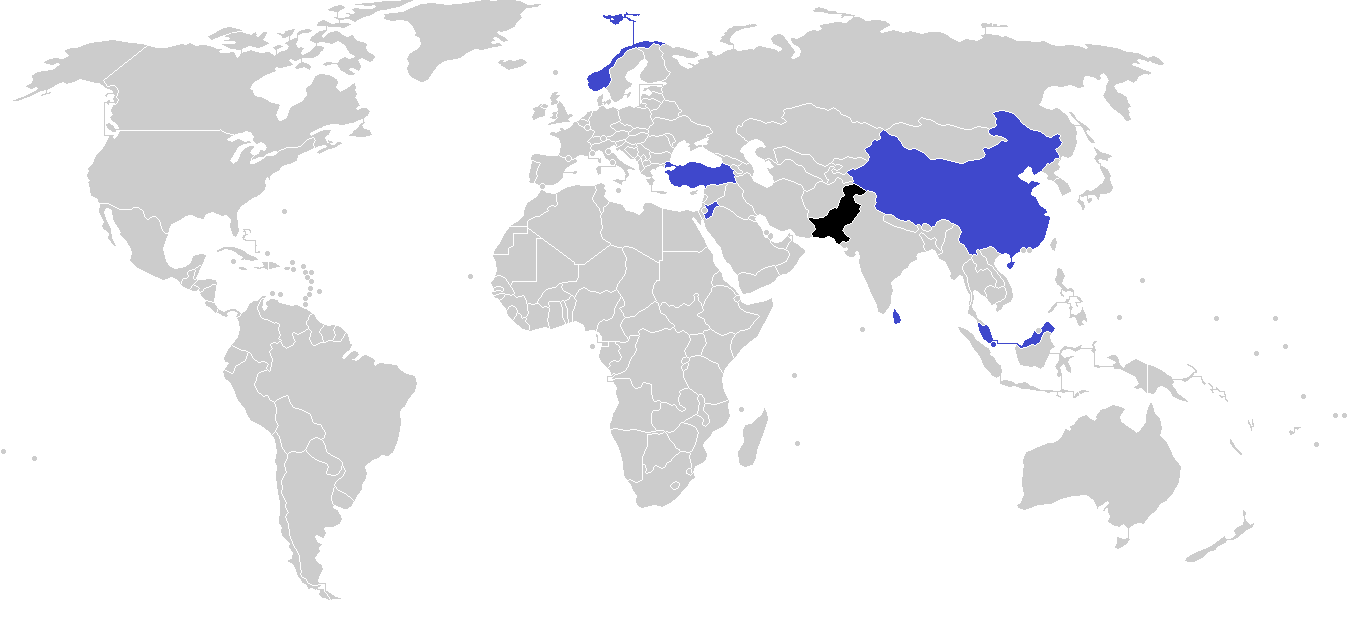
Black = Pakistan Blue = Countries where Diya WFC has taken part in an international competition

The State Bank of Pakistan held its own women's championship, in which Diya WFC earned the 3rd place during the 4th edition in 2016.

==== International youth friendly competitions ====
Sponsored by Geo News of Pakistan and Alma Culture Center of Norway, and with the personal financial support of Diya's managers, U-13 and U-14 teams went to Norway in July 2017 to participate to the Norway Cup, without scoring any goal and getting 23 against. It was the first time a Pakistani team participated in a European tournament.

In August 2017, Diya WFC's G-16 team went to Turkey to play friendly matches, sponsored by the Turkish Cooperation and Coordination Agency, and U-13 and U-14 teams went to China for the Gothia Cup. In August 2019, a mixed gender U-11 team went also to China for the Gothia Cup and won the fair play trophy among 66 participating teams.

=== Variations of football ===
==== Futsal ====
The club won the All-Pakistan Women Futsal Championship 2010, defeating Eco Adventure Club Islamabad (1–0), and Fatima Ansari and Kiran Yousuf were declared best players of the tournament.

In 2021, Diya WFC won the All Karachi Under-23 Girls Futsal Tournament, among eight teams, defeating Karachi Ladies FC (8–2), and Shumaila Gulab Hussain was declared as one of the best players.

==== Five and six-a-side football ====
Diya WFC also participates to Leisure Leagues events in Pakistan. It earned the Leisure Leagues Women Football's Pink Cup 2020, held in October to promote breast cancer awareness, defeating Garrison Football Academy (2–0). The club won the Leisure Leagues Women's Cup 2021, defeating IBA United (2–0).

== Social activities ==
Through sport, Diya WFC's purpose is to give girls a chance for empowerment, and "transport, education and health fees are entirely covered" by the club It also teaches the players soft skills.

Since 2008, every 25 February, Diya WFC and the United Nations hold a friendly match with girls from poor areas of Karachi to promote gender equality, equal rights and to stop violence against women.

For the International Women's Day of 2015, the PFF held for the first time an Asian Football Confederation workshop in collaboration with Diya WFC and Balochistan United W.F.C.

In June 2018, Diya WFC, in collaboration with Right To Play and Women Win, at the invitation of Thar Foundation, organized a football discovery session (including a four-month preparation, training of coaches and matches) and provided equipment for U-13 girls in the remote district of Tharparkar, which has the lowest Human Development Index of Pakistan. A similar operation was conducted in September 2020 in different areas of Karachi, along with Right To Play, Women Win and the US mission in Pakistan.

In October 2020, Imam Baloch, director of the National Bank of Pakistan, lauded Diya WFC's actions for spreading football to poor and "backward areas", such as Karachi localities of Malir, Lyari and Ibrahim Hyderi and such Sindh province districts of Hyderabad, Thatta, Mirpur Khas and Tharparkar, as well as discovering new talents over there. In Thatta, the club organized a four-day camp for 10 to 16 years old girls and awareness workshops about food and nutrient and COVID-19.
