= Football in Pakistan =

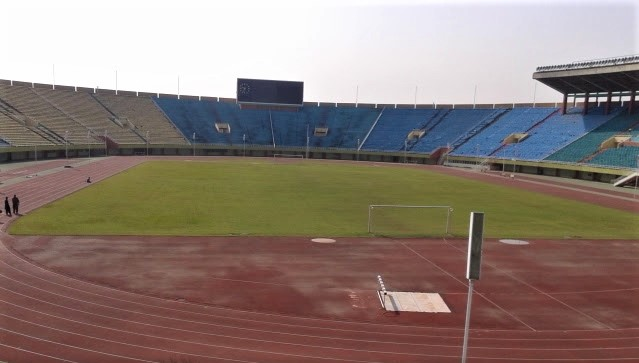
- Jinnah Sports Stadium
- Country: Pakistan
- Governing body: Pakistan Football Federation
- National team: Men's national team
- First played: 1950

National competitions
- FIFA World Cup; AFC Asian Cup; SAFF Championship; Quaid-e-Azam International Tournament (defunct); President's Gold Cup International Tournament (defunct); AFC U-20 Asian Cup; SAFF U-20 Championship; AFC U-17 Asian Cup; SAFF U-17 Championship

Club competitions
- League: Pakistan Premier League PFF League B Division National Football Championship (defunct) Super Football League (defunct); Cup: National Challenge Cup AFC Cup AFC Challenge League AFC Challenge Cup (defunct) SAFF Club Championship SAFF Club Women's Championship

Football is among the most popular team sports in Pakistan, together with long time number one cricket and field hockey.

Pakistan's current top domestic football league is the Pakistan Premier League, recognised by the AFC as the official national football league. The National Challenge Cup is a knock-out competition among Pakistani departmental and government institutions. Football in general is run by the Pakistan Football Federation.

== History ==
=== Origins ===
The origin of football in Pakistan can be traced back to the mid-nineteenth century when the game was introduced by British soldiers during the British Raj. British evangelist Theodore Leighton Pennell played a crucial role in introducing football to the North-West Frontier Province (now Khyber Pakhtunkhwa) in the last decade of the nineteenth century. In the south in Karachi, the sport was further popularised through interactions with sailors at the port.

One of the regional federations to organise football in what is now Pakistan Territory was the North-West India Football Association, established in 1932 and reportedly encompassing football control in Punjab, NWFP, Sindh and Balochistan. In addition several regional leagues were also organised in cities such as Lahore. Before the 1930s, football in the region was dominated by military, railway, and college teams. Before independence, many notable players from present-day Pakistan also made their mark in the Calcutta League, particularly for Kolkata Mohammedan.

=== Early years (1950s) ===
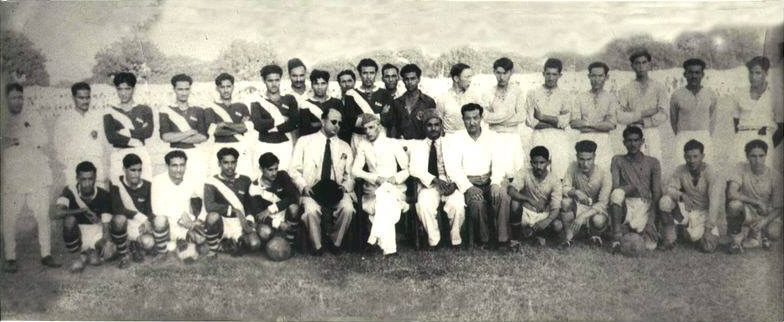
Muhammad Ali Jinnah as chief guest of the 1946 Punjab National Bank Golden Jubilee All-India Football Tournament, Hazara FC Quetta (team at right)

Shortly after the creation of Pakistan in 1947, the Pakistan Football Federation (PFF) was created, and Muhammad Ali Jinnah became its first Patron-in-Chief. PFF received recognition from FIFA in early 1948.

The annual National Football Championship was organised shortly after. Held on knock-out basis and a closed format competition, this tournament brought together regional provincial and division association teams, as well as departmental and armed forces teams representing various government institutions, emerging as the premier football tournament in the country. Parallel to the championship, many separate amateur regional leagues with promotion and relegation featuring clubs were also held, like Karachi Football League, Lahore District Football League, or Quetta Football League. Players frequently took part in these competitions for their local clubs, while also being selected to represent either their provincial/divisional associations or their departmental teams in the National Championship. The Dhaka First Division League gave a level of competitive professionalism in East Pakistan, which lacked in West Pakistan, and many players affiliated with its clubs, both from West and East Pakistan, were chosen to represent the East Pakistan provincial team or the Dhaka Division team in the National Championship.

In 1950, the national team gained their first international experience in Iran and Iraq. Pakistan's next international outing came in the 1952 Asian Quadrangular Football Tournament where the team played its first match against India, which ended in a goalless draw and emerged as joint winners of the tournament after finishing with the same points in the table.

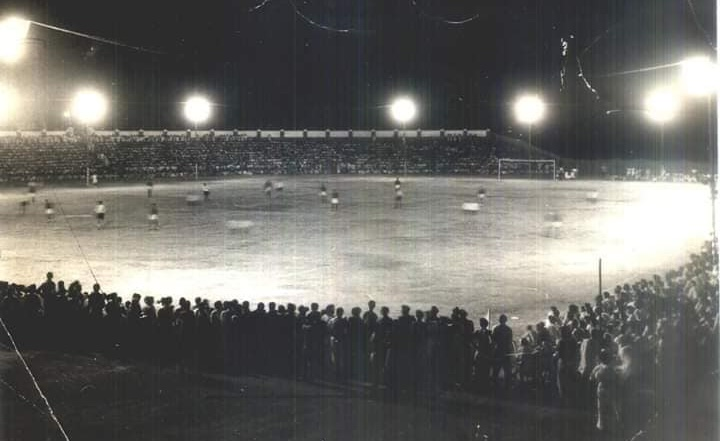
Ismail Gold Shield Football Tournament at Ibn-e-Qasim Bagh Stadium in the 1950s

In the 1950s because of limited options available for PFF, international games were infrequent. Pakistan could not participate in any World Cup qualification for many years because of financial limitations and political instability inside the PFF, competing mainly in the Asian Quadrangular Football Tournament editions and the Asian Games. Pakistan also hosted the Ismail Gold Shield Football Tournament which featured teams from India, Iran, Ceylon, along with others. The matches were held under floodlights, mainly at the Ibn-e-Qasim Bagh Stadium in Multan.

=== Emergence (1960s) ===
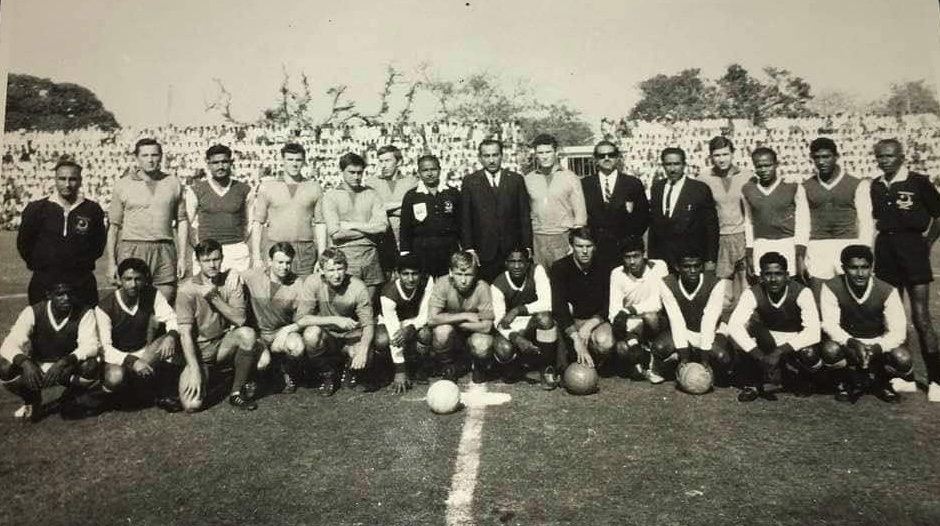
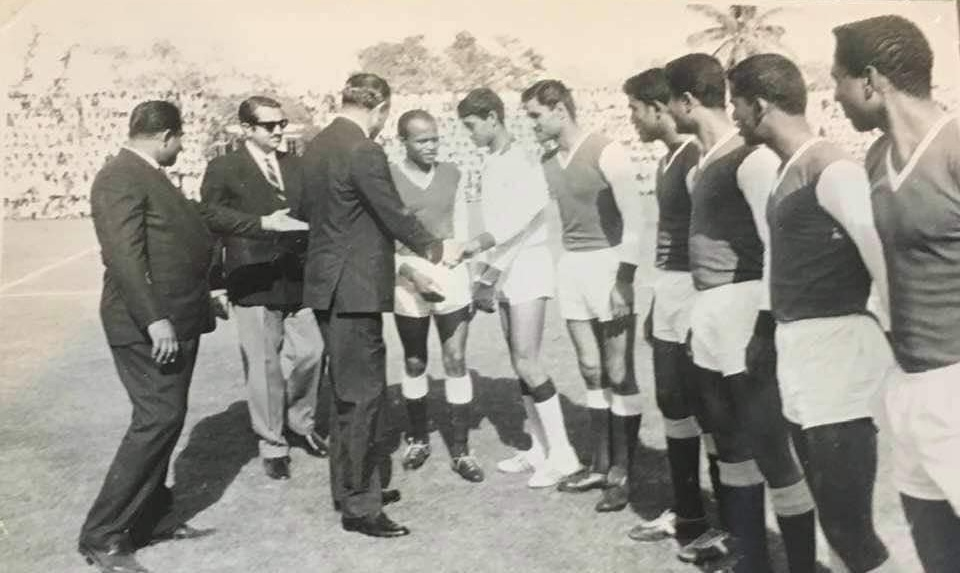
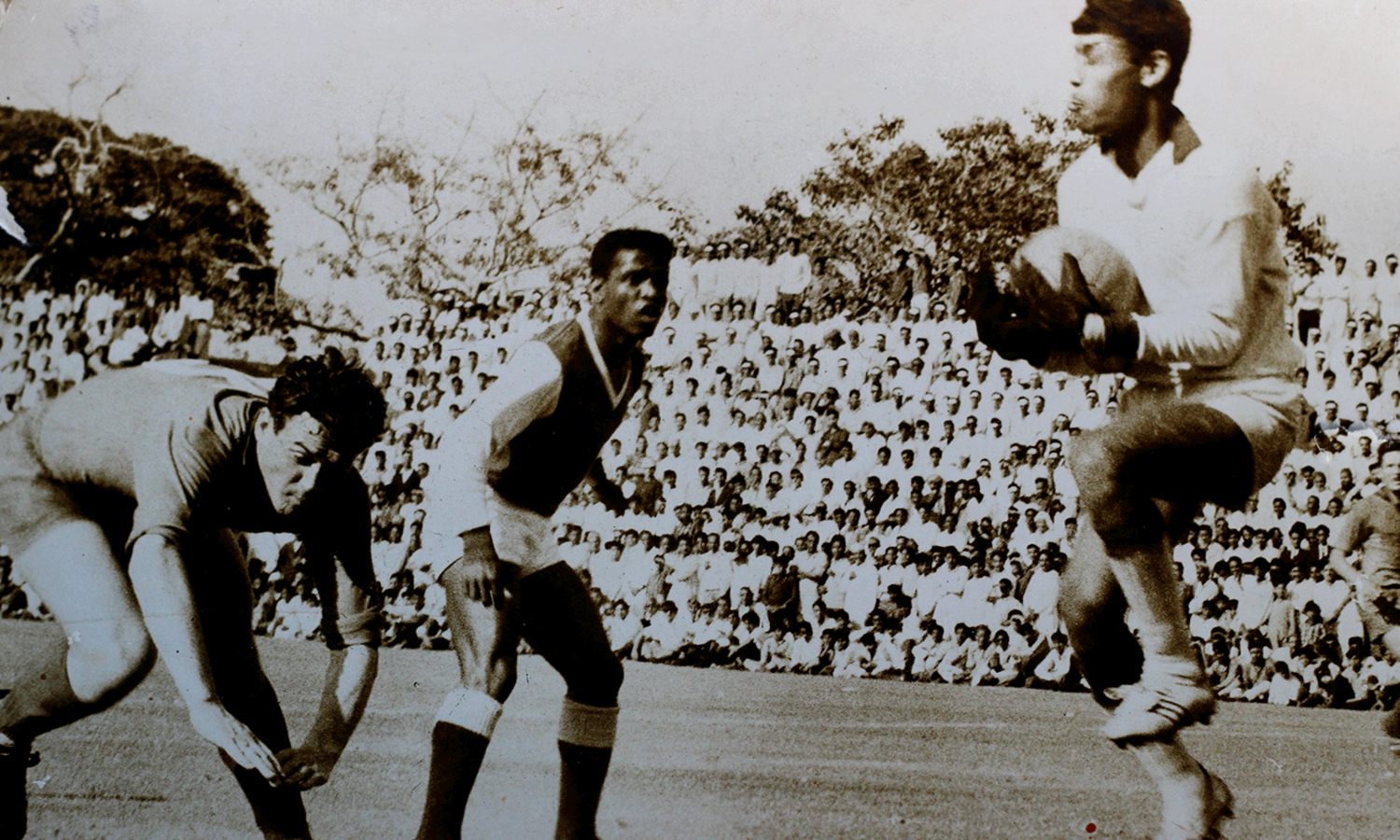
Pakistan national football team in a friendly against CSKA Moscow from the Soviet Union at the KMC Stadium on 28 February 1969

The 1960s resulted in Pakistan football most prominent years. Pakistan had participated in various friendly tournaments in the early 1960s, with the Merdeka Cup hosted in Malaysia after the country first participation in 1960. Pakistan recorded a 7–0 victory over Thailand, and a 3–1 win over Japan. In the 1962 Merdeka Tournament, Pakistan ended runner up after falling to Singapore by 1–2 in the final.

The decade also saw many foreign teams often tour Pakistan for test matches, including Burma (1961), China (1963) and Saudi Arabia (1967) national teams, and teams from the Soviet Union. In 1963, whilst on a world tour, Bundesliga side Fortuna Düsseldorf toured East and West Pakistan playing friendly matches against select XI sides. The American team Dallas Tornado went on a world tour that took them from Europe to Asia. During the trip, the team made a week’s stop in Pakistan from October to November 1967, where they played the Pakistan national team.

=== Dark era (1970s) ===
Following the 1971 Bangladesh Liberation War, East Pakistan became the independent nation of Bangladesh. This separation also led to the loss of the Dhaka First Division League.

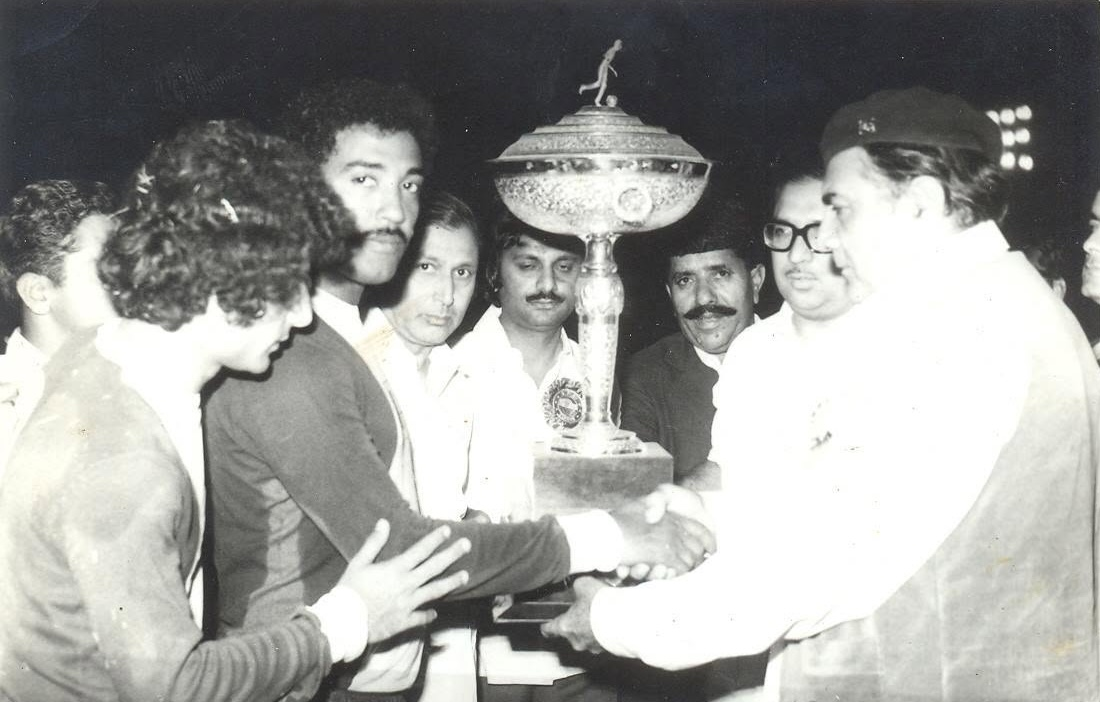
Pakistan Airlines receiving the 1976 National Football Championship trophy. The team dominated the competition from the 1970s till 1990s with nine titles

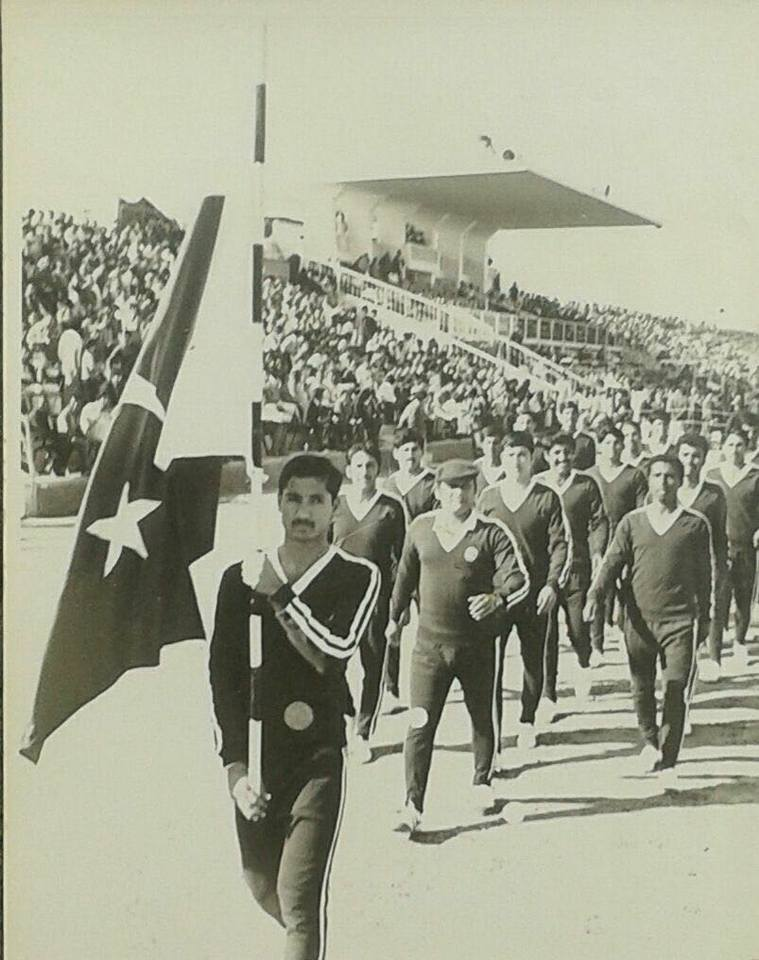
Pakistan at the 1974 RCD Cup in Karachi

Football mainly survived on the basis of sports budgets of departmental teams like WAPDA, Army, KESC, SSGC, PIA and Railways, which hired footballers as employees and provided them with a basic wage to play for their sides and work full time in the off-season. During this dark period, however, several local leagues were launched across the Middle East, where several Pakistani players represented club sides in these leagues and some of these players even coached the clubs’ new youth setups. Several local tournaments also started in Pakistan, such as the international Quaid-e-Azam International Tournament.

=== Resurgence (1980–1990) ===
In 1985, the Asian Football Confederation brought back the Asian Club Championship after a 14 year absence. Pakistan Airlines, having won the 1984 Inter-Provincial Championship, was elected to become Pakistan’s first representative in Asian club football, ending up unsuccessful. Pakistan started playing a vital role in the World Cups for years before the participation. The sports goods industry of Sialkot had been providing millions of footballs around the world, peaking during World Cup seasons, since 1980. However Pakistan began with their first ever participation for the 1990 FIFA World Cup qualifiers for Italy in 1989, ending up unsuccessful. The national team bounced back, when several months later they took Gold at the 1989 South Asian Games, beating Bangladesh 1–0 in the final. In the 1991 South Asian Games, Pakistan beat the Maldives in the final 2–0 to win their second Gold. Later in the year the first SAFF Cup took place in Lahore in 1993, and the national team finished fourth.

=== Decline (1990s–2003) ===
Pakistani football became a hot bed for politics in the early 1990s. In 1990, Pakistan Football Federation held its general elections in which Mian Muhammad Azhar won the presidency by a margin of one vote, beating the Pakistan Peoples Party leader Faisal Saleh Hayat. Azhar later ousted PFF General Secretary Hafiz Salman Butt (a Member of National Assembly of Jamaat-e-Islami) in 1994 due to political rifts and alleged abuse of power.

Under Hafiz Salman Butt, the 1992–93 and 1993–94 seasons of the National Football Championship structured on a proper league-style basis and spread over a number of months. The top division, named as National Lifebuoy A-Division Football Championship, operated alongside a system of promotion and relegation with the second-tier National Lifebuoy B-Division Football Championship, which was won by Crescent Textile Mills (1992), National Bank (1993), and Frontier Scouts (1994). Wohaib FC, founded by Butt, emerged as a leading club of the country in the early 1990s and became the first Pakistani club to pass the qualifying round of the Asian Club Championship, where it qualified in the 1992–93 edition.

The years were often regarded as the best administrative era of Pakistani football. Butt also managed to get a three-year sponsorship deal with Lifebuoy Soap, with amounts of 35 million PKR spent in the organisations of the seasons and televised through the country. In 1992, Lever Brothers Pakistan Limited also signed a sponsorship and financed the PFF to revive the National Youth Championship and ensured that football was included in the National Games of Pakistan as one of the sports, besides ensuring a spot in the Asian Football Confederation competitions. With Butt's dismissal in 1994 and ban by FIFA in 1995, Pakistani football declined again into an era of mismanagement and long-lasting lack of sponsors in the upcoming years. The National Championship also reverted to its previous knockout format.

Pakistan Airlines lost their dominance until the end of the 1990s, winning their last of 9 national championships in 1997. WAPDA, Pakistan Army, and Allied Bank before their disbanding in early 2000s took over as the dominant sides in Pakistan. The physically dominant gameplay of Punjab teams, had over-taken Karachi football by then.

=== Faisal Saleh Hayat Era (2003–2017) ===
In August 2003, the PFF became under new management, as the politician Faisal Saleh Hayat took over. Under new management, the Pakistan Football Federation phased out the National Football Championship and in 2004 introduced the Pakistan Premier League with promotion and relegation. With the inception of the newly formed league, provincial and divisional teams were phased out. In contrast, departmental and armed forces teams, which hired footballers as employees and provided them with a basic wage to play for their sides and work full time in the off-season, remained active in the new league format. The emergence of clubs like founding member Afghan FC Chaman or Muslim FC gave competition to departmental sides, which poached talented players without any transfer fees or compensation involved. The Super Football League of 2007, running as a parallel city-based league to Pakistan Premier League, held in Karachi saw record crowds at Peoples Stadium. It wasn’t until 2010 with the next edition that the Geo League came back only to be discontinued due to differences with the PFF. The Pakistan under-23 national team also showed improvement, winning the South Asian Games gold in 2004 and 2006. Karachi also saw resurgence in football with Karachi United emerging in the mid 2000s focusing on grass-roots level football in Pakistan.

However the controversial PFF chief Makhdoom Syed Faisal Saleh Hayat politician soon became known as a "feudal lord of Pakistani football" due to embezzlement of funds among other controversies. Since March 2015, the top division of the Pakistan Premier League remained suspended because the crisis created due to his actions, along with the men's senior team, who remained suspended from any international competition, and FIFA rankings of the senior team had slumped. During his controversial tenure, Pakistan's FIFA ranking dropped from 168 in 2003 to 201 in 2017, which was the year that PFF consequently received a ban from FIFA.

=== Suspensions and inactivity (2018–2022) ===
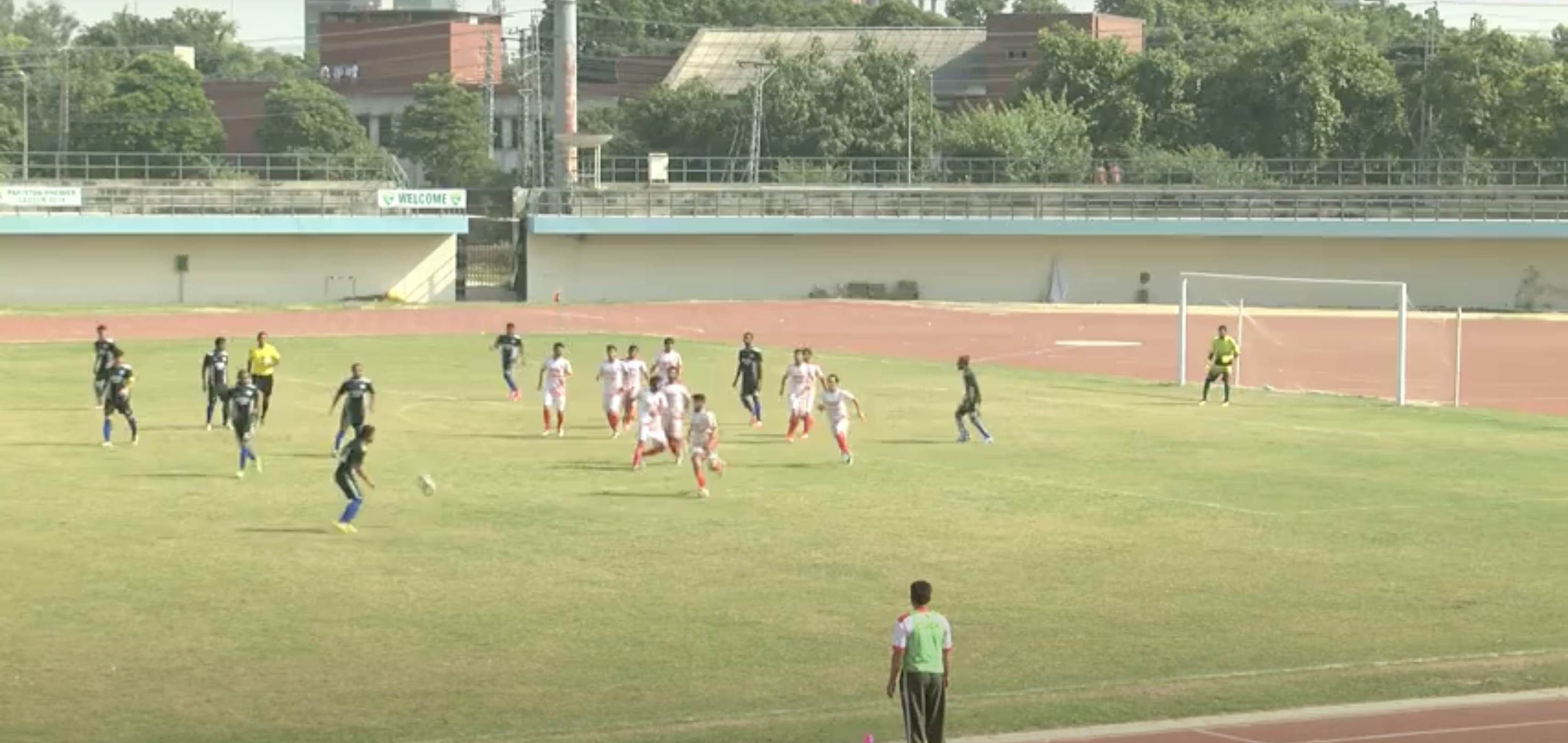
Afghan Chaman against the Ashraf Sugar Mills departmental team during the 2018–19 Pakistan Premier League

The lift on suspension by FIFA on 13 March 2018. The 2018–19 season was ultimately organised by two different federations. Faisal Saleh Hayat-led Pakistan Football Federation, which was internationally recognised, started the league and non-FIFA recognised Ashfaq Hussain Shah group, which formed a parallel PFF, coming into power by third-party interference through the PFF elections conducted by the Supreme Court. In 2019, Pakistan national team also lost its chance to pass the 2022 FIFA World Cup qualification after losing against Cambodia due to national camps held by two different factions. In January 2019, Atlético Madrid also launched Pakistan's first European football academy.

After the suspension once again from all football activities by FIFA on 7 April 2021, the 2021–22 season was initially organised by the Ashfaq Hussain Shah group, who again came to power after attacking and taking charge of the PFF office. The tournament was suspended after a few months into the season and then cancelled.

Majority of the departmental clubs were also disbanded following the shutdown of departmental sports in Pakistan in September 2021. Departmental sports in Pakistan were restored in August 2022. As of July 2023 however, few departments reportedly remained active in football, and since then became restricted to the PFF National Challenge Cup.

=== 2022–present ===
The suspension was lifted on 29 June 2022. On 27 July 2023, the draw for the first round of the 2026 FIFA World Cup qualification took place in which Pakistan were drawn once again against Cambodia, followed by the appointment of the English coach Stephen Constantine. In the first leg in Phnom Penh, Pakistan contested in a goalless 0–0 draw. Pakistan won their second leg beating Cambodia 1–0 in Islamabad, recording their first-ever victory in World Cup qualifiers in their first fixture at home for eight years, and qualifying for the second round for the first time.

On 6 February 2025, the federation was suspended again by FIFA due to its failure to adopt a revision of the PFF Constitution that would ensure truly fair and democratic elections as part of lifting the previous suspension. The suspension was to be lifted again when the PFF Congress approved the version of the PFF Constitution presented by FIFA and the AFC. The suspension was lifted on March 2nd 2025, when the revised PFF Constitution was approved by the PFF Congress.

== League system ==
The knock-out based National Football Championship served as the highest level football competition from 1948 to 2003. Parallel to the championship, many separate amateur regional leagues with promotion and relegation featuring clubs were also held, like Karachi Football League, Lahore Football League, or Quetta Football League. Players frequently took part in these competitions for their local clubs, while also being selected to represent either their provincial/divisional associations or their departmental teams in the National Championship.

=== National A-Division Football Championship (1992–1994) ===
The 1992–93 and 1993–94 seasons of National Football Championship were contested in a league-style format, and were the Pakistan's first ever national league format competition. Sponsored as the National Lifebuoy A-Division Football Championship, the tournament ran across several months and introduced a system of promotion and relegation with the second-tier National Lifebuoy B-Division Football Championship.

=== Pakistan Premier League (2004–2021) ===
The National Championship was eventually replaced by the Pakistan Premier League from the 2004 season in order to modernise the sport in Pakistan. The Pakistan Premier League operates on a system of promotion and relegation with the Football Federation League. In 2006, the Pakistan Football Federation introduced the National Club Championship as a third tier beneath the PFF League.

=== Franchise leagues ===
The franchise based Super Football League was held in 2007 and 2010.

== Cup competitions ==
=== Domestic ===
- National Challenge Cup (1979–present): Initially named as Inter Departmental Championship, it was introduced in 1979 to offer nationwide competition to departmental selections and armed forces teams excluded from the national football league of Pakistan.
- Lifebuoy Football Champions Cup (1990–1991): Cup tournament organised with sponsorship from Unilever's Lifebuoy brand. The competition featured top departmental teams such as PIA and WAPDA alongside private clubs like Wohaib FC. The inaugural edition in 1990 was won by Wohaib FC on penalties against PIA, while a second edition followed in 1991. The tournaments marked the first domestic football events in Pakistan to be broadcast live on national television.

=== International ===
- Quaid-e-Azam International Tournament (1976–1987): Annual international football tournament held in Pakistan. The tournament was established to commemorate the centenary of the birth of Muhammad Ali Jinnah.
- President's Gold Cup International Tournament (1986): International football tournament in home venue, only one edition was held in 1986.

=== Regional ===
- National Football Championship (1948–2003): Highest level football competition from 1948 to 2003 before the introduction of Pakistan Premier League. It featured teams representing divisions, provinces, and departmental teams across Pakistan.
- KPT-PFF Cup (2010): Cup competition for departmental and provincial teams, only one edition was held in 2010.
- Peshawar Premier Football league (2017–2025): is a regional-level association football competition based in the city of Peshawar.

=== Youth ===
- National U-19 Football Championship (1964–2009): Men's highest youth national level football competition in Pakistan from 1964 to 2009. Held on knock-out basis, similar to the National Football Championship.

=== Other ===
Some following notable tournaments were held outside the auspices of the Pakistan Football Federation and any national sports governing body:

- National Games of Pakistan (1982–present): Competition for provincial teams and departmental teams of Pakistan.
- Ismail Gold Shield Football Tournament (1956–?): An invitational international football competition held annually at Ibn-e-Qasim Bagh Stadium, Multan, under the auspices of Colony Textile Mills tournament committee. Similar to the DCM Trophy, the tournament was notable for being Pakistan's first football tournament to provide the national clubs with foreign international exposure due to participation of foreign teams. Shahin Abadan was among the notable participants.
- NBP President's Cup (2017): A standalone tournament organised by National Bank of Pakistan in Karachi, during the suspension of official PFF competitions due to the crisis within the federation.

== National teams ==
- Pakistan national football team
- Pakistan national football B team
- Pakistan national under-23 football team
- Pakistan national under-20 football team
- Pakistan national under-17 football team

== Significance of Lyari in Football Development ==
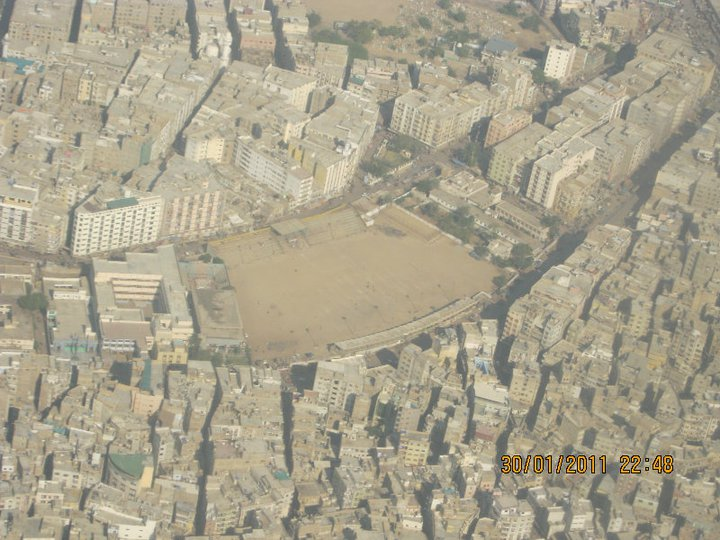
Panoramic view of Lyari along with Kakri Football Ground

Lyari, a neighbourhood in Karachi, holds an important place in Pakistan's football landscape due to its historical and cultural ties to the sport. Dating back several decades, Lyari has been a consistent source of football talent particularly the 1960s, contributing significantly to the national sports scene. Notable players from Lyari during this period include Abdul Ghafoor, nicknamed the "Pakistani Pelé" and "Black Pearl of Pakistan", Muhammad Umer, Moosa Ghazi, Abid Ghazi, Turab Ali, Ali Nawaz Baloch, among others. The Kakri Ground and People's Football Stadium, which is one of the major football stadiums in the country are located in the city.

One notable aspect is the nickname "Mini Brazil" often associated with Lyari, reflecting the neighborhood's passion for football, drawing parallels to the football culture of Brazil.

== Largest football stadiums by capacity in Pakistan ==
Stadium	Capacity	City	Province	Home team(s)
Jinnah Sports Stadium	48,900	Islamabad	Islamabad Capital Territory	Pakistan national football team
People's Football Stadium	40,000	Karachi	Sindh	Pakistan national football team

== National Sports Award recipients ==
Year	Recipient	Award	Gender
1960	Syed Abdus Samad	Pride of Performance	Male
1962	Hafiz Rashid	Pride of Performance	Male
1963	Abbas Mirza	Pride of Performance	Male
1964	Khondkar Nasim Ahmed	Pride of Performance	Male
1966	Sheikh Shaheb Ali	Pride of Performance	Male
1969	Moideen Kutty	Pride of Performance	Male
1989	Muhammad Umer	Tamgha-e-Imtiaz	Male
1995	Ali Nawaz Baloch	Pride of Performance	Male

== See also ==
- Football manufacturing in Pakistan
- List of football clubs in Pakistan
- Pakistani football clubs in Asian competitions
