= Jinnah Sports Stadium =

Sports venue in Islamabad, Pakistan

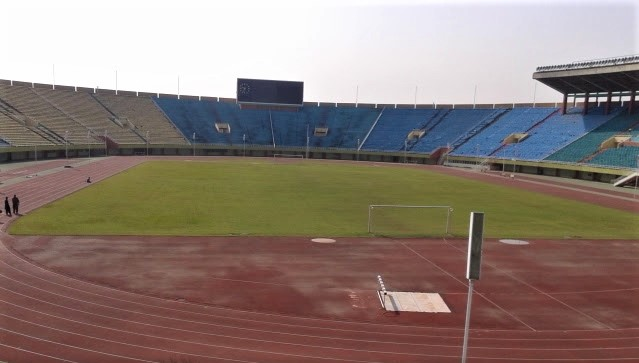
- Interactive map of Jinnah Sports Stadium
- Location: Islamabad, Pakistan
- Coordinates: 33°42′2″N 73°5′34″E
- Elevation: 536 metres (1,759 ft)
- Owner: Pakistan Sports Board
- Capacity: 48,700
- Executive suites: 26
- Surface: Natural grass
- Acreage: 45,000 sq. m

Construction
- Built: 1970s
- Architect: China State Construction Engineering Corporation

Tenant
- Pakistan national football team (1986–present)

Website
- www.sports.gov.pk/index

Jinnah Sports Stadium (Urdu: جناح سپورٹس سٹیڈیم) is a multi-purpose stadium in Islamabad, Pakistan. It is currently mostly used for football matches and serves as the home venue for the Pakistan national football team. The stadium has a capacity of 48,700 people, and is the largest stadium in Pakistan. The stadium is owned by the Pakistan Sports Board. The stadium is part of the Pakistan Sports Complex which also houses Liaquat Gymnasium, a gymnasium sports complex for indoor sports.

== History ==
=== Early years ===
Named after Pakistan's founder Muhammad Ali Jinnah, the stadium was built in the 1970s by China State Construction Engineering Corporation for hosting the 1978 Asian Games, which were ultimately shifted to Bangkok. The Liaquat Gymnasium nearby was formally inaugurated as part of the complex when Pakistan played host to the seventh 1984 Asian Table Tennis Championships.

=== Home of Pakistan football ===
In 1986, it hosted the 1986 Quaid-e-Azam International Tournament for football matches. The stadium was first renovated and used for the South Asian Games in 1989. The same year, it also hosted the 1990 FIFA World Cup qualification where Pakistan participated for the first time.

The stadium was once again chosen as a venue for the South Asian Games when Pakistan again hosted the event in 2004. Apart from being one of the main venues of several national sports events such as the National Games of Pakistan, Quaid-e-Azam Inter Provincial Youth Games, or football events such as the Pakistan Premier League and the National Women Football Championship, the stadium has been a regular home venue for the Pakistan national football team since the 1980s. In 2014, the stadium hosted the 2014 SAFF Women's Championship for the Pakistan women national football team.

== Refurbishments ==
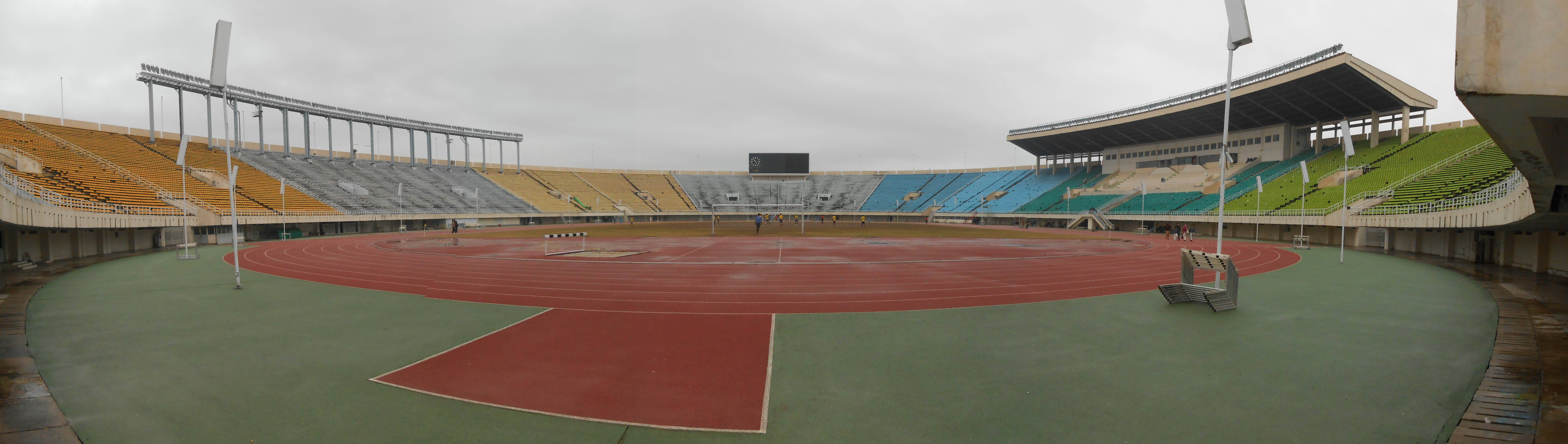
Panorama view

The stadium was first renovated to serve as host for the South Asian Games in 1989 with help of Chinese engineers.

After years of inactivity due to the ban on Pakistan Football Federation by FIFA, the stadium served as host after 11 years since Pakistan ever held an international football event, for the 2026 FIFA World Cup qualification on 17 October 2023, which resulted in Pakistan's first ever victory in a World Cup qualifying match against Cambodia. Due to the scarcity of stadiums in Pakistan meeting FIFA standards, the stadium was refurbished including the grass, goalposts. For the matches at the next round, the stadium went more reforms upgrading the floodlights and seats.

== Hosting history ==
=== Multi-sport events ===
- 1989 South Asian Games
- 2004 South Asian Games
- 2027 South Asian Games (proposed)

=== Football events ===
- 1986 Quaid-e-Azam International Tournament
- 1990 FIFA World Cup qualification
- 2007 AFC Asian Cup qualification
- 2014 SAFF Women's Championship
- 2026 FIFA World Cup qualification
- 2027 AFC Asian Cup qualification

=== Baseball events ===
- 2006 Asian Baseball Cup
- 2010 Asian Baseball Cup
- 2015 Asian Baseball Cup
- 2017 Asian Baseball Cup
- 2023 West Asia Baseball Cup

While football, baseball, and athletics have been the main international sports hosted at Jinnah Sports Stadium, the broader Islamabad Sports Complex has also hosted the 1984 Asian Table Tennis Championships and the 1988 Asian Wrestling Championships.

=== 2013 National Games ===
The National Games held in Islamabad from June 28 to July 4, 2013 took place at the Pakistan Sports Complex, with a colourful opening ceremony at Jinnah Stadium, inaugurated by the Speaker of the National Assembly, Sardar Ayaz Sadiq. Around 2000 athletes from provincial and departmental teams competed across 29 Olympic sports, bringing a major multi-sport event back to the capital. Despite organisational challenges including disputes between factions of the Pakistan Olympic Association, the Games went ahead successfully. Pakistan Army emerged as the top-performing contingent, securing the overall winners’ trophy, while WAPDA and Punjab remained strong competitors throughout the week. Even with the off-field controversy, the Islamabad event became one of the city’s most significant sporting gatherings of the decade, showcasing national athletic talent and energising the country’s sports community.

== Football tournaments ==
=== 1986 Quaid-e-Azam International Tournament ===
The stadium was the venue for the 1986 Quaid-e-Azam International Tournament.

Date	Team #1	Res.	Team #2	Round	Attendance
25 April 1986	Pakistan Greens	1–0	Sri Lanka	Round Robin	N/A
25 April 1986	China	5–0	Nepal	Round Robin	N/A
26 April 1986	Pakistan Greens	1–0	South Korea XI	Round Robin	N/A
26 April 1986	Pakistan Whites	0–7	China	Round Robin	N/A
27 April 1986	Nepal	2–2	Sri Lanka	Round Robin	N/A
27 April 1986	Pakistan Whites	0–4	South Korea XI	Round Robin	N/A
28 April 1986	Pakistan Whites	2–3	Sri Lanka	Round Robin	N/A
28 April 1986	Pakistan Greens	0–3	China	Round Robin	N/A
29 April 1986	South Korea XI	5–0	Nepal	Round Robin	N/A
30 April 1986	South Korea XI	4–0	Sri Lanka	Round Robin	N/A
30 April 1986	Pakistan Greens	7–0	Pakistan Whites	Round Robin	N/A
1 May 1986	China	3–0	Sri Lanka	Round Robin	N/A
1 May 1986	Pakistan Whites	0–2	Nepal	Round Robin	N/A
2 May 1986	Pakistan Greens	5–0	Nepal	Round Robin	N/A
2 May 1986	China	1–1	South Korea XI	Round Robin	N/A

=== 1989 South Asian Games ===
The stadium was the venue for the 1989 South Asian Games.

Date	Team #1	Res.	Team #2	Round	Attendance
20 October 1989	Maldives	0–0	Nepal	Group stage	N/A
21 October 1989	Bangladesh	3–0	Sri Lanka	Group stage	N/A
22 October 1989	Pakistan	0–0	Nepal	Group stage	N/A
23 October 1989	Bangladesh	1–1	India	Group stage	N/A
24 October 1989	Pakistan	2–0	Maldives	Group stage	N/A
25 October 1989	India	2–1	Sri Lanka	Group stage	N/A
26 October 1989	India	2–1	Nepal	Bronze medal match	N/A
26 October 1989	Pakistan	1–0	Bangladesh	Gold medal match	N/A

=== 2004 South Asian Games ===
The stadium was the venue for the 2004 South Asian Games.

Date	Team #1	Res.	Team #2	Round	Attendance
1 April 2004	Pakistan	1–0	Bangladesh	Group stage	N/A
1 April 2004	India	2–0	Afghanistan	Group stage	N/A
3 April 2004	India	4–1	Bhutan	Knockout stage	N/A
3 April 2004	Pakistan	1–1	Sri Lanka	Knockout stage	N/A
5 April 2004	Sri Lanka	0–0	Bhutan	Bronze medal match	N/A
5 April 2004	Pakistan	1–0	India	Gold medal match	37,000

=== 2014 SAFF Women's Championship ===
The stadium was the venue for the 2014 SAFF Women's Championship.

Date	Team #1	Res.	Team #2	Round	Attendance
11 November 2014	Pakistan	1–2	Sri Lanka	Group stage	6,500
12 November 2014	Nepal	8–0	Bhutan	Group stage	2,000
13 November 2014	India	8–0	Maldives	Group stage	250
13 November 2014	Bangladesh	6–1	Afghanistan	Group stage	5,000
14 November 2014	Sri Lanka	3–0	Bhutan	Group stage	500
14 November 2014	Pakistan	0–2	Nepal	Group stage	1,700
15 November 2014	Maldives	1–0	Afghanistan	Group stage	2,000
15 November 2014	India	5–1	Bangladesh	Group stage	2,000
16 November 2014	Nepal	3–0	Sri Lanka	Group stage	600
16 November 2014	Pakistan	4–1	Bhutan	Group stage	4,000
17 November 2014	Afghanistan	0–12	India	Group stage	2,000
17 November 2014	Maldives	1–3	Bangladesh	Group stage	900
19 November 2014	India	5–0	Sri Lanka	Semi-finals	2,000
19 November 2014	Nepal	1–0	Bangladesh	Semi-finals	5,000
21 November 2014	India	6–0	Nepal	Final	8,000

== Marka-e-Haq Ceremony ==
The Marka-e-Haq (“Battle of Truth”) Ceremony, held on 13 August 2025 in Islamabad, marked Pakistan's 78th Independence Day and celebrated its recent military victory in the Marka-e-Haq conflict. Attended by President Asif Ali Zardari, Prime Minister Shehbaz Sharif, Chief of Army Staff Field Marshal Asim Munir, and foreign dignitaries, the event featured military parades including contingents from Türkiye and Azerbaijan, an aerial fly-past by the Pakistan Air Force, cultural performances, fireworks, and the unveiling of a commemorative monument. In his address, the Prime Minister called for national unity through a “Charter of Pakistan’s Stability” and announced the creation of the Army Rocket Force Command. Earlier in the day, a grand defense exhibition at Shakarparian showcased military hardware from the conflict, while nationwide celebrations honored martyrs and reaffirmed Pakistan's sovereignty.

== See also ==
- List of stadiums in Pakistan
