= Giovanni Antonio =

Giovanni Antonio is a masculine blended given name that is a combination of Giovanni and Antonio. Notable people known by this name include the following people:

== Given name ==
=== Clergy ===
- Giovanni Antonio Acquaviva d'Aragona (?? – 1525), Italian Roman Catholic prelate
- Giovanni Antonio Angrisani (1560–1641), Italian Roman Catholic prelate
- Giovanni Antonio Astorch (died 1567), Italian Roman Catholic prelate
- Giovanni Antonio Cavazzi da Montecuccolo, known as Giovanni Cavazzi da Montecuccolo (1621–1678), Italian Capuchin missionary
- Giovanni Antonio de Carbonariis (15th century – ??), Italian Augustinian Friar
- Giovanni Antonio de Paola (died 1591), Italian Roman Catholic prelate
- Giovanni Antonio de' Vecchi (died 1672), Italian Roman Catholic prelate
- Giovanni Antonio Facchinetti, birthname of Pope Innocent IX (1519 – 1591), Italian head of the Catholic Church
- Giovanni Antonio Gallo (?? – 1543), Italian Roman Catholic prelate
- Giovanni Antonio Grassi (1775–1849), Italian Jesuit priest
- Giovanni Antonio Guadagni (1674 – 1759), Italian cardinal
- Giovanni Antonio Farina (1803 – 1888), Italian Catholic bishop
- Giovanni Antonio Galderisi (1577–1658), Italian Roman Catholic prelate
- Giovanni Antonio Onorati (?? – 1606), Italian Roman Catholic prelate
- Giovanni Antonio Pandosi (died 1562), Italian Roman Catholic prelate
- Giovanni Antonio Santorio (?? – 1628), Italian Roman Catholic prelate
- Giovanni Antonio Serbelloni (1519–1591), Italian Cardinal
- Giovanni Antonio Viperani also known as Juan Antolínez Brecianos de la Rivera (?? – 1610), Italian Roman Catholic prelate

== Musicians ==
- Giovanni Antonio Giay (1690 – 1764), Italian composer
- Giovanni Antonio Leoni (c. 1600 – ??), Italian violinist and composer
- Giovanni Antonio Pandolfi Mealli (c. 1630 – c. 1669/1670), Italian composer and violinist
- Giovanni Antonio Rigatti (c. 1613 – 1648), Italian composer and choirmaster

== Painters ==
- Giovanni Antonio Amato (c. 1475–1555), Italian painter
- Giovanni Antonio Bazzi, known as Il Sodoma (1477 – 1549), Italian painter
- Giovanni Antonio Bellinzoni da Pesaro (1415-1477), Italian painter
- Giovanni Antonio Boltraffio (1466 or 1467 – 1516), Italian painter
- Giovanni Antonio Burrini (1656 – 1727), Italian painter
- Giovanni Antonio Caldelli (1721-1791), Italian-Swiss painter
- Giovanni Antonio Canal, known as Canaletto, (1697 – 1768), Italian painter
- Giovanni Antonio Capello (1699 – 1741), Italian painter
- Giovanni Antonio Cucchi (fl. 1750), Italian painter
- Giovanni Antonio De Pieri (1671–1751), Italian painter
- Giovanni Antonio de’ Sacchis, byname Il Pordenone (c. 1484–1539), Italian painter
- Giovanni Antonio di Amato the younger or Giovanni Antonio d'Amato the younger (c. 1535–1598), Italian painter
- Giovanni Antonio Emanueli (1816 – 1894), Italian painter
- Giovanni Antonio Faldoni (1689 – c. 1770), Italian painter and engraver
- Giovanni Antonio Fasolo (1530–1572), Italian painter
- Giovanni Antonio Fumiani (1645–1710), Italian painter
- Giovanni Antonio Greccolini (1675–1756), Italian painter
- Giovanni Antonio Guardi (1699 – 1760), Italian painter and nobleman
- Giovanni Antonio Lappoli (1492–1552), Italian painter
- Giovanni Antonio Laveglia (1653 – after 1710), Italian painter
- Giovanni Antonio Licinio the younger (c. 1515–1576), Italian painter
- Giovanni Antonio Lelli (1591 – August 3, 1640), Italian painter
- Giovanni Antonio Molineri (1577 - 1631), Italian painter
- Giovanni Antonio Pandolfi (painter) (c. 1540 - c. 1581), Italian painter
- Giovanni Antonio Pellegrini (1675 – 1741), Italian painter
- Giovanni Antonio Scaramuccia (1580–1633), Italian painter
- Giovanni Antonio Sogliani (1492–1544), Italian painter
- Giovanni Antonio Vanoni (1810–1886), Swiss painter
- Giovanni Antonio Zaddei (1729 - ??), Italian painter

== Others ==
- Giovanni Antonio Amadeo (c. 1447 – 1522), Italian sculptor, architect, and engineer
- Giovanni Antonio Amedeo Plana (1781 – 1864), Italian astronomer and mathematician
- Giovanni Antonio Antolini (1756 – 1841), Italian architect and writer
- Giovanni Antonio Battarra (1714 – 1789), Italian priest, naturalist, and mycologist
- Giovanni Antonio Campani (1429 – 1477), Italian humanist
- Giovanni Antonio da Brescia (fl 1490–1519), Italian engraver
- Giovanni Antonio Del Balzo Orsini (1386 or 1393 – 1463), Italian nobleman and military leader
- Giovanni Antonio de' Rossi or Giovan Antonio de' Rossi (1616–1695), Italian architect
- Giovanni Antonio Dosio (1533–1611), Italian architect
- Giovanni Antonio Galignani (1757–1821), Italian newspaper publisher
- Giovanni Antonio Galli (1708–1782), Italian physician
- Giovanni Antonio Galli (artist) (baptized 1585 – after June 1651), Italian artist
- Giovanni Antonio Giobert (1761 - 1834), Italian chemist and mineralogist
- Giovanni Antonio Lecchi (1702 - 1776), Italian jesuit and mathematician
- Giovanni Antonio Magini (1555 – 1617), Italian astronomer, astrologer, cartographer, and mathematician
- Giovanni Antonio Maria Zanardini, known as Giovanni Zanardini (12 June 1804, Venice – 24 April 1878), Italian physician and botanist
- Giovanni Antonio Medrano (1703–1760), Italian architect
- Giovanni Antonio Palazzo, Italian writer
- Giovanni Antonio Sangiorgio (?? – 1509), Italian canon lawyer and Cardinal
- Giovanni Antonio Sanna (1819 – 1875), Italian entrepreneur and politician
- Giovanni Antonio Scalfarotto (1672 – 1764), Italian architect
- Giovanni Antonio Scopoli (1723 – 1788), Austrian physician and naturalist
- Giovanni Antonio Stuardi (1862 -1938), Italian sculptor
- Giovanni Antonio Tagliente (c. 1460s - c. 1528), Italian calligrapher, author, printer and publisher
- Giovanni Antonio Viscardi (1645 – 1713), Swiss architect

== Middle name ==
- Claudio Giovanni Antonio Monteverdi or Claudio Monteverdi (baptized 1567 – 1643), Italian composer
- Giuseppe Giovanni Antonio Meneghini (1811 – 1889), Italian botanist, geologist and paleontologist

== See also ==
- Giovannantonio
