= Capponi =

Capponi is a surname. Notable people with the surname include:

- Carla Capponi (1918–2000), Italian politician
- Claudio Capponi (born 1959), Italian film composer
- Filippo Fasio Capponi (died 1570), Italian Roman Catholic prelate
- Gino Capponi (1792–1876), Italian statesman and historian
- Giuseppe Capponi (1832–1889), Italian operatic tenor
- Luigi Capponi (1582–1659), Italian Roman Catholic cardinal
- Michael Capponi (born 1972), American businessman
- Pat Capponi (1949–2020), Canadian author
- Pier Paolo Capponi (1938–2018), Italian actor and screenwriter
- Piero Capponi (1447–1496), Italian statesman and historian

== See also ==
- Caponi, another surname
