= Chris Craft =

Chris Craft may refer to:

- Chris Craft (racing driver) (1939–2021), British motor racing driver
- Chris-Craft Boats, the original American boat manufacturer established in the 19th century
- Chris-Craft Corporation, the current American boat manufacturer established in 2000
- Chris-Craft Industries, a former manufacturing and broadcasting company and co-owner of the defunct UPN television network
- Crisscraft, 1975 jazz album by saxophonist Sonny Criss

== See also ==
- Christine Craft (born 1944), attorney, radio talk show host, television news anchor
- Christopher C. Kraft Jr. (1924–2019), former NASA engineer and manager
