= Curiale =

Curiale is a surname. Notable people with the surname include:

- Andrea Curiale, 16th-century Roman Catholic prelate
- Davis Curiale (born 1987), Italian footballer
- Joseph Curiale (born 1955), American composer, producer, arranger, and conductor

== See also ==
- Curiales
