= Pietrasanta (surname) =

Pietrasanta is an Italian surname. Notable people with the surname include:

- Andrea Centurione Pietrasanta (1471–1546), Doge of the Republic of Genoa
- Angela Maria Pietrasanta, mother of Letizia Bonaparte and Joseph Fesch, and maternal grandmother of Napoleon I
- Angelo Pietrasanta (1837–1876), Italian painter
- Yves Piétrasanta (1939–2022), French politician

== See also ==
- Pietrasanta
