= Antonio Molinari =

Antonio Molinari may refer to:

- Antonio Molinari (painter) (1655–1704), Venetian baroque painter
- Antonio Molinari (bishop) (1626–1698), Roman Catholic prelate and Bishop of Lettere-Gragnano
- Antonio Molinari (runner) (born 1968), Italian distance runner
