= San Francesco d'Assisi, Turin =

Church of San Francesco d'Assisi
- Chiesa di San Francesco d'Assisi
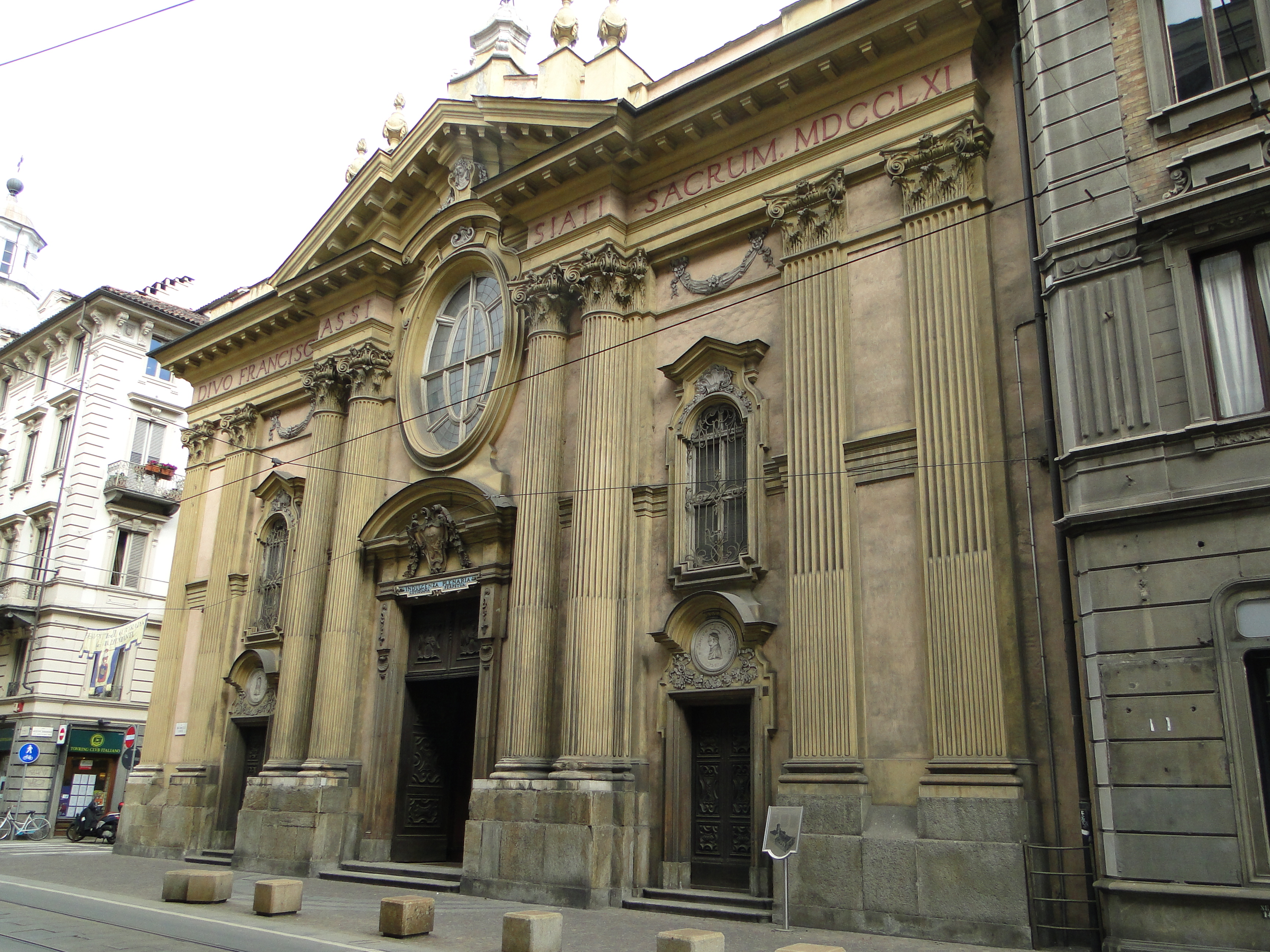
- Façade of the church

- Map of Turin
- 45.0717°N 7.6806°E
- Country: Italy
- Denomination: Roman Catholic Church

Architecture
- Style: Baroque
- Groundbreaking: 1608
- Completed: 1761

Administration
- Archdiocese: Turin

San Francesco d'Assisi is a Baroque style, Roman Catholic church located on via San Francesco d'Assisi in Turin, region of Piedmont, Italy. The church of San Rocco is on the same street.

== History ==
A church on this site had been present since the 13th century, putatively erected by St Francis of Assisi himself. Construction of the present church began in 1602. In 1673, the main altar was reconstructed in marble. In 1761, the building was refurbished and a façade and some were added, based on designs by Mario Ludovico Quarini and Bernardo Vittone. Above the entrance portal is a large oval window and an interrupted cornice, with pinnacles on the roofline. The chapel of St Antony of Padua was designed also by Vittone.

A further refurbishment occurred in 1863–1865. Rodolfo Morgari retouched the frescoes on the ceiling of the presbytery, and his pupil, Alberto Masoero, repainted the vault of the central nave. The chapel of the Immaculate Conception is richly decorated with marble, and has canvases depicting a Visitation and an Annunciation by Giovanni Antonio Molineri, the pupil of Luigi Caraccio. In the chapel of the Guardian Angel is a painting by Ayres. The church remained in the custody of the Franciscan Order till the 19th century.

The chapel of Sant'Anna (1637) was enriched with late-Baroque stucco decoration; the main altarpiece depicting Madonna and Child and St Anne is attributed to Federico Zuccari. The original frescoes were by Giovanni Andrea Casella, but were painted over in the 19th century. The church suffered minor damage during the bombardments of July 13, 1943.
