= Gabriele Pontangeli =

Roman Catholic bishop (d. 1478)

Most Reverend Gabriele Pontangeli
- Bishop of Lettere-Gragnano
- Church: Catholic Church
- Diocese: Diocese of Lettere-Gragnano
- In office: 1455–1478
- Predecessor: Antonio de Celano
- Successor: Antonio de Miraballis

Orders
- Consecration: by Pope Callistus III

Personal details
- Died: 1478

Gabriele Pontangeli (died 1478) was a Roman Catholic prelate who served as Bishop of Lettere-Gragnano (1455–1478).

== Biography ==
On 30 January 1455, Gabriele Pontangeli was appointed during the papacy of Pope Nicholas V as Bishop of Lettere-Gragnano. He served as Bishop of Lettere-Gragnano until his death in 1478.

== External links and additional sources ==
- Cheney, David M. "Diocese of Lettere (-Gragnano)". Catholic-Hierarchy.org. (for Chronology of Bishops) ^{[self-published]}
- Chow, Gabriel. "Titular Episcopal See of Lettere (Italy)". GCatholic.org. (for Chronology of Bishops) ^{[self-published]}

Catholic Church titles
Preceded by Antonio de Celano	Bishop of Lettere-Gragnano; 1455–1478	Succeeded by Antonio de Miraballis
