= Odoardo Tabacchi =

Italian sculptor (1836–1905)

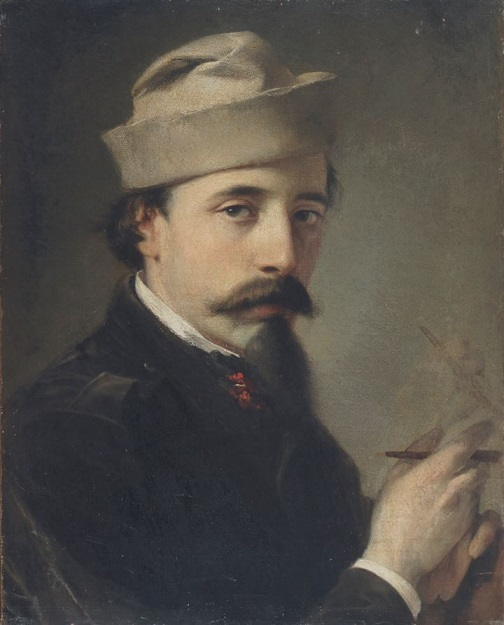
Portrait of Odoardo Tabacchi by Angelo Pietrasanta

Odoardo Tabacchi (Valganna, 19 December 1836 - Milan, 23 March 1905) was an Italian sculptor.

== Biography ==
=== Early life and education ===
Odoardo Tabacchi was born in Valganna on 19 December 1836. He enrolled at the Brera Academy in Milan at the age of 14 in order to follow the courses of Benedetto Cacciatori (1794–1871); at the same time, he studied with Abbondio Sangiorgio. In 1858 he won the Pensionato Trienniale in sculpture, which enabled him to move first to Florence, in 1860 to Rome, and in 1861 to Naples. After working with Pietro Magni and Giovanni Strazza he returned to Milan and opened his own studio.

=== Career ===
Together with Antonio Tantardini (1829–79), Tabacchi won the competition for the monument to Camillo Benso, Count of Cavour in Milan. Tabacchi was entrusted with the figure of the statesman (1862–5), which became a prototype for realistic and dynamic celebratory statues. Between 1863 and 1867 he produced statues of St. Mary the Egyptian and St. Dorothy for Milan Cathedral, as well as of historical figures, including Dante for the Galleria Vittorio Emanuele II, Milan. Tabacchi also received many important private commissions, especially for such funerary sculpture as the Angel of Justice and the Guardian Angel for the Ponti di Gallarate mausoleum in Varese (1867).

In 1868, after the resignation of Vincenzo Vela, he became Professor of Sculpture at the Albertina Academy of Fine Arts in Turin, where he taught for 40 years. During the 1870s Tabacchi was so highly regarded by critics in Turin that he was awarded commissions for monuments without going through the usual competitions (e.g. for the statues of Giacomo Leopardi and Annibale Caro, both 1884, at Fermo). In the same period he also began a series of genre pieces, most of which were presented at exhibitions and expositions in Italy and abroad, and which were replicated many times (e.g. the Girl Diving, 1877; Trezzo sull'Adda, Palazzo Comunale).

He also executed a series of female nudes showing a predilection for compositions of smoothly polished bodies. During the 1880s Tabacchi was particularly occupied with the production of celebratory monuments (e.g. Victor Emmanuel II (1880–82) in Padua). His funerary sculptures always show an attention to narrative and realistic detail, a careful study of physiognomy and a consistent formal quality, as in the Omodei tomb (1875) in the Cimitero Monumentale di Milano.

Tabacchi was known for making copies of classic statuary, busts and reliefs. In 1870, in Parma he displayed a statue depicting: La Peri. In 1872, he exhibited in Milan Hypatria (Naples, 1877). He also completed a larger than life marble, later bronze, statue of Arnaldo da Brescia, exhibited in Turin in 1880. He made a portrait of Michelangelo Buonarroti for the 1883 Roman Exhibition. In Turin in 1884, he exhibited a sculptural group titled Libro pericoloso; and three busts Fiori del Ballo, Count Avogadro di Quaregna, and Dreamland.

His pupils include Giuseppe Grandi, Pietro Canonica, Davide Calandra, Emmanuel Villanis, Leonardo Bistolfi, and Antonio Stuardi.

== Gallery ==
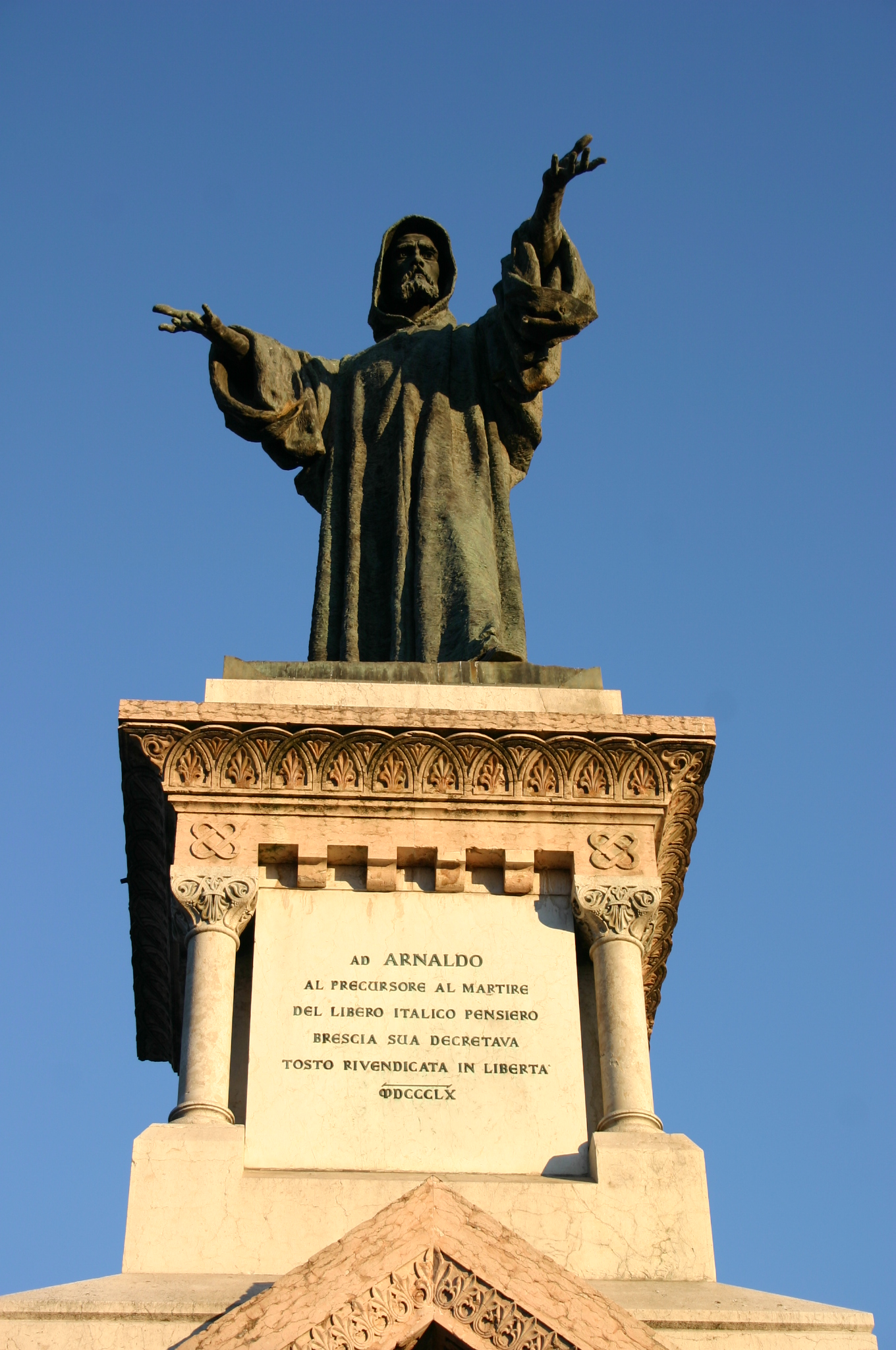
Monument to Arnold of Brescia, Brescia, Italy (1882)

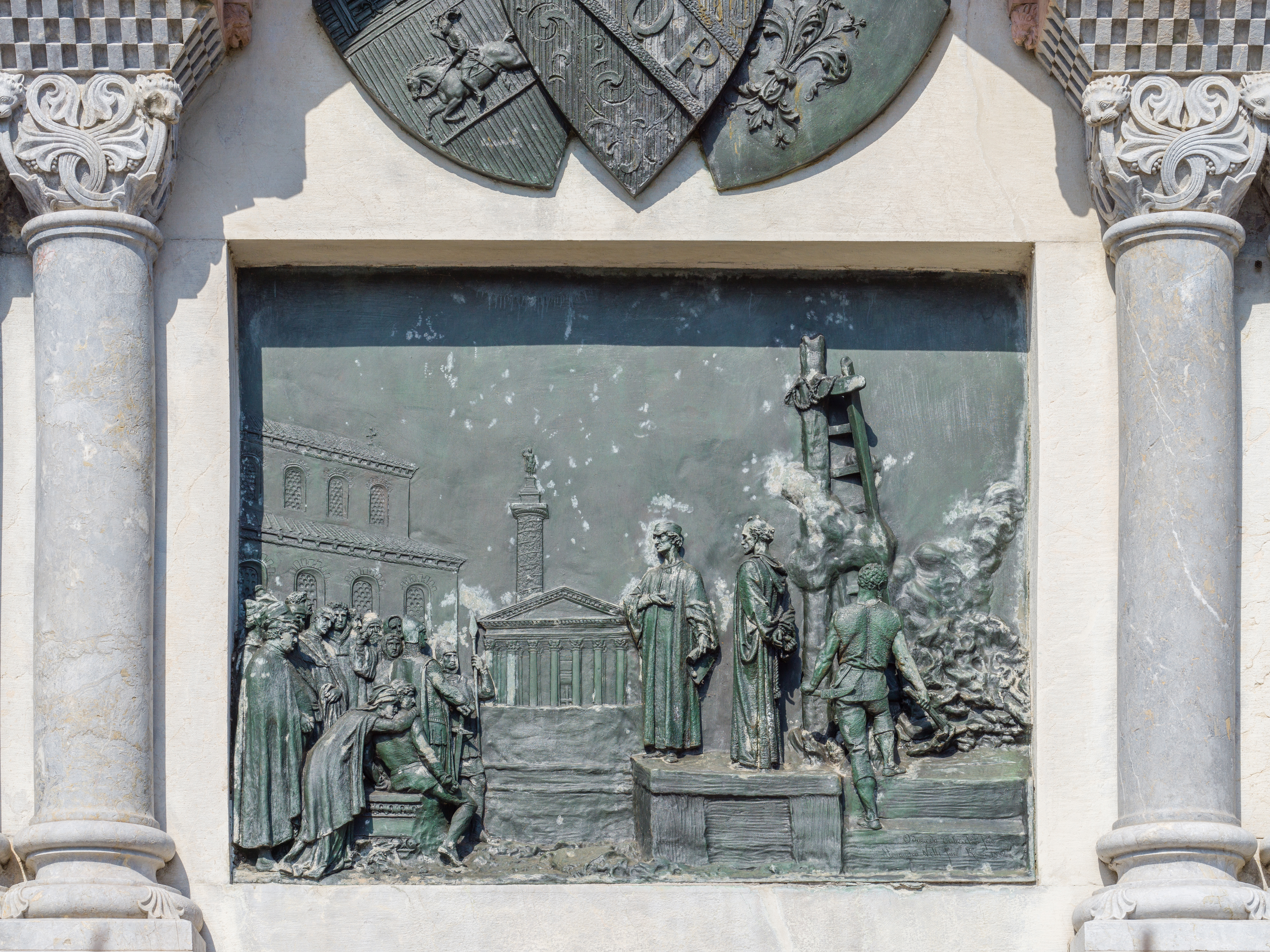
Bronze relief of Piazzale Arnaldo square in Brescia (1882)

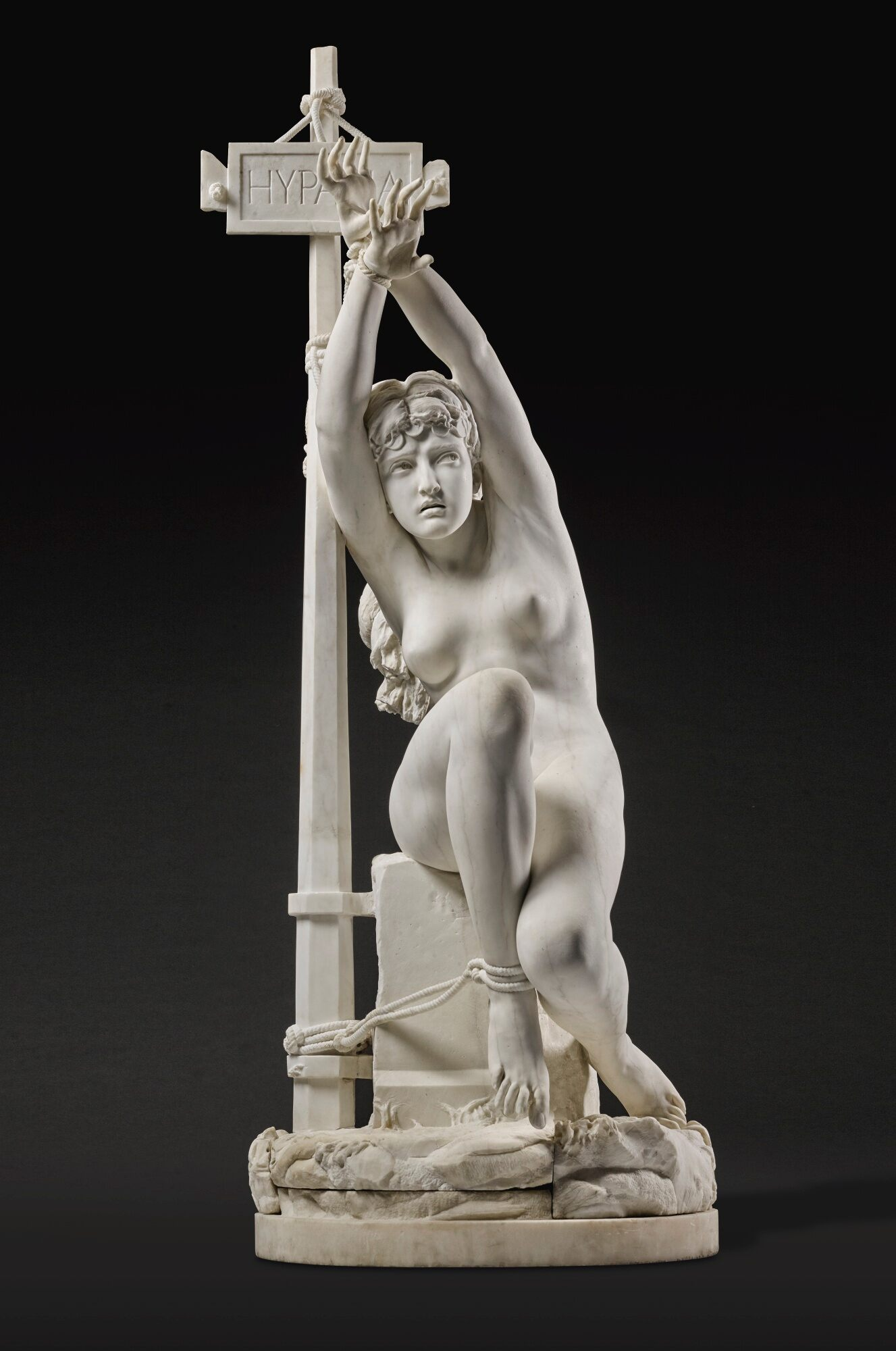
Hypatia (1874)

== Bibliography ==
- Cavenago, Marco (2019). "TABACCHI, Odoardo". Dizionario Biografico degli Italiani (in Italian). Vol. 94: Stampa–Tarantelli. Rome: Istituto dell'Enciclopedia Italiana. ISBN 978-88-12-00032-6.
