= Giovan Antonio =

Giovan Antonio is a masculine blended given name that is a combination of Gianni and Antonio. Notable people known by this name include the following:

- Giovanni Antonio de' Rossi, known as Giovan Antonio de' Rossi, (1616–1695), Italian architect
- Giovan Antonio Rusconi (c. 1500-05 – 1578), Italian architect, hydraulic engineer, translator and illustrator

== See also ==
- Giovannantonio
