= Giovanni Bernardino Grandopoli =

Italian Roman Catholic prelate

Most Reverend Giovanni Bernardino Grandopoli
- Bishop of Lettere-Gragnano
- Church: Catholic Church
- Diocese: Diocese of Lettere-Gragnano
- In office: 1576–1590
- Predecessor: Aurelio Griani
- Successor: Giovanni Leonardo Bottiglieri

Orders
- Consecration: 4 November 1576 by Giulio Antonio Santorio

Personal details
- Died: 1590 Lettere, Italy

Giovanni Bernardino Grandopoli (died 1590) was a Roman Catholic prelate who served as Bishop of Lettere-Gragnano (1576–1590).

== Biography ==
On 19 September 1576, Giovanni Bernardino Grandopoli was appointed during the papacy of Pope Gregory XIII as Bishop of Lettere-Gragnano. On 4 November 1576, he was consecrated bishop by Giulio Antonio Santorio, Cardinal-Priest of San Bartolomeo all'Isola, with Cesare de' Giacomelli, Bishop of Belcastro, and Gaspare Viviani, Bishop of Hierapetra et Sitia, serving as co-consecrators. He served as Bishop of Lettere-Gragnano until his death in 1590. While bishop, he was the principal co-consecrator of Francesco D'Afflitto, Bishop of Scala (1583).

== External links and additional sources ==
- Cheney, David M. "Diocese of Lettere (-Gragnano)". Catholic-Hierarchy.org. (for Chronology of Bishops) ^{[self-published]}
- Chow, Gabriel. "Titular Episcopal See of Lettere (Italy)". GCatholic.org. (for Chronology of Bishops) ^{[self-published]}

Catholic Church titles
Preceded by Aurelio Griani	Bishop of Lettere-Gragnano; 1576–1590	Succeeded by Giovanni Leonardo Bottiglieri
