= Antonio de Miraballis =

Italian Roman Catholic prelate

Most Reverend Antonio de Miraballis
- Bishop of Lettere-Gragnano
- Church: Catholic Church
- Diocese: Diocese of Lettere-Gragnano
- In office: 1478–1503
- Predecessor: Gabriele Pontangeli
- Successor: Andrea Curiale

Personal details
- Died: 1503

Antonio de Miraballis (died 1503) was a Roman Catholic prelate who served as Bishop of Lettere-Gragnano (1478–1503).

== Biography ==
On 14 January 1478, Antonio de Miraballis was appointed during the papacy of Pope Sixtus IV as Bishop of Lettere-Gragnano. He served as Bishop of Lettere-Gragnano until his death in 1503.

== External links and additional sources ==
- Cheney, David M. "Diocese of Lettere (-Gragnano)". Catholic-Hierarchy.org. (for Chronology of Bishops) ^{[self-published]}
- Chow, Gabriel. "Titular Episcopal See of Lettere (Italy)". GCatholic.org. (for Chronology of Bishops) ^{[self-published]}

Catholic Church titles
Preceded by Gabriele Pontangeli	Bishop of Lettere-Gragnano; 1478–1503	Succeeded by Andrea Curiale
