= Michael Capponi =

American businessman and humanitarian

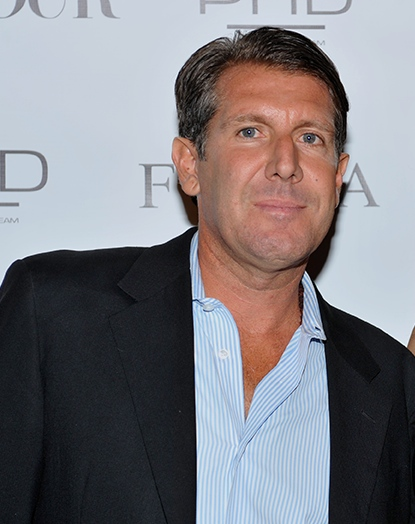
- Michael Capponi
- Born: Michael Jean Francois Capponi; April 5, 1972 (age 54)
- Occupations: Philanthropist, Businessman
- Known for: Philanthropy, Global Empowerment Mission, Real Estate Development
- Website: globalempowermentmission.org/team/michael-capponi/

Michael Jean Francois Capponi (born April 5, 1972) is an American businessman, humanitarian, and philanthropist. Initially recognized for his role in developing Miami Beach's nightlife, Capponi is now widely recognized for his humanitarian efforts through his foundation, Global Empowerment Mission.

== Early life ==
Capponi was born in Belgium; he moved to Miami with his parents when he was six, and grew up on Key Biscayne. His parents divorced. He began working as a promoter for nightclubs when he was 15, organizing events and posting flyers, and while still in high school made $10,000 per month. As a teen, Capponi also was a competitive BMX rider, winning a state championship and appearing in ads for Coca-Cola and Twix

== Career ==
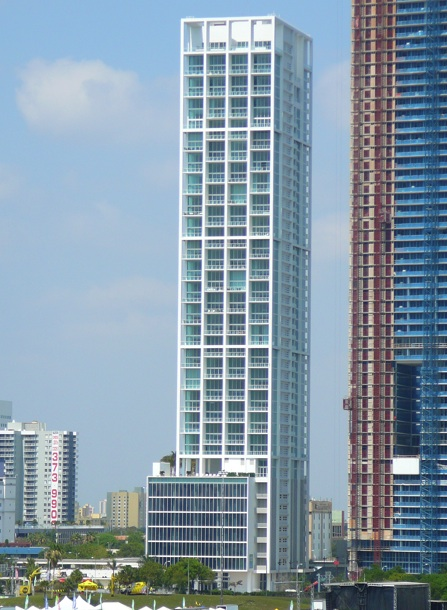
Ten Museum Park, Miami

In the 1980s, he promoted roving parties that attracted the attendance of rich locals and celebrities. He is considered one of the most successful nightlight pioneers in Miami. Capponi also worked as a developer alongside Gregg Covin. Together, they used the parties to promote real estate projects in the area to celebrities and wealthy investors. Capponi's contributions to South Beach's development continued into the 1990s. With Covin, Armin Mattli, and Chad Oppenheim, Capponi in 2004 became one of the co-developers of Ten Museum Park, a 50-story, 200-unit building in downtown.

In 2010, he formed Capponi Construction Group. His firm was responsible for the renovation of Terra Veritatis, a 16-bedroom estate spanning 2.5 acres (1.0 ha) of Miami Beach completed in 2013. The Wall Street Journal called the $40 million project "the most expensive renovation in the Miami area." Capponi and Gary Shear formed another company in 2013, Capponi Shear Construction, a general contracting firm.

In 2014, Capponi joined the development team with Moses Bensusan of Costa Hollywood, an urban beachfront development, by architect Hamed Rodriguez. The 500,000-square-foot resort consists of 307 fully furnished apartments.

Now, Capponi has retired from the private sector and is fully committed to running his foundation, Global Empowerment Mission.

== Humanitarian work ==
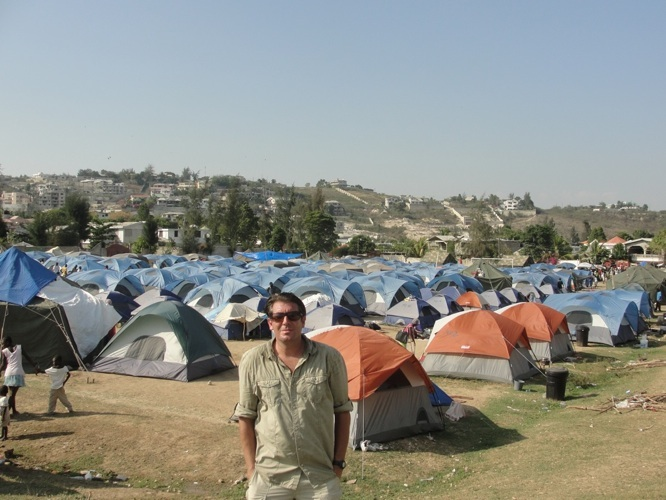
Capponi at his tent city in Belvil, Pétion-Ville, Haiti – March 2010

Capponi began his transformation into humanitarian work and disaster relief aid in 1999 during the war in Kosovo by organizing nightclubs to contribute proceeds to the Red Cross. When Hurricane Charley hit Florida in August 2004, Capponi teamed up with the American Red Cross and organized relief efforts for the victims. He worked with local nightlife venues to raise money and provide support. The partnership continued in December 2004, with a fundraiser for the Thailand tsunami victims.

In 2006, Capponi teamed up with Miami Rescue Mission to fortify and expand its annual Great Thanksgiving Day Banquet, which feeds over 2,500 homeless people in Miami. In 2012, Capponi announced the construction of a 78-bed men's shelter for Miami Rescue Mission.

After the January 12, 2010 Haiti earthquake, Capponi organized a plane with a relief team consisting of Miami Beach firefighters and doctors. In December 2010, Capponi started a project to revitalize Jacmel, a historical town in Haiti. This initiative was to help stimulate a self-sustained tourism economy for Haiti. In 2011, he founded the non-profit organization Haiti Empowerment Mission. His work focused on sustainable development by rebuilding homes, schools and communities, reducing the sustainability cycle. In 2016, the foundation changed its name to Global Empowerment Mission to reflect its international outreach. Capponi serves as the Founder and President, dedicating himself to being on the ground and overseeing disaster relief efforts. His work is focused on immediately responding to all phases of global disasters and providing disaster relief. From his home base in Miami, Florida, Capponi works to organize shipments and logistics, bridge the gap between first response and infrastructure rebuilding and create sustainable development through Global Empowerment Mission. As of 2022, Capponi has returned to Haiti nearly 100 times.

Capponi has held events for various charities. In 2012, Donna Karan hosted Capponi's 40th birthday benefit at Capitale for the Haitian city of Jacmel. On October 5, 2016, the day after Hurricane Matthew hit Haiti, Capponi and the Global Empowerment Mission team were on the ground delivering aid and supplies.

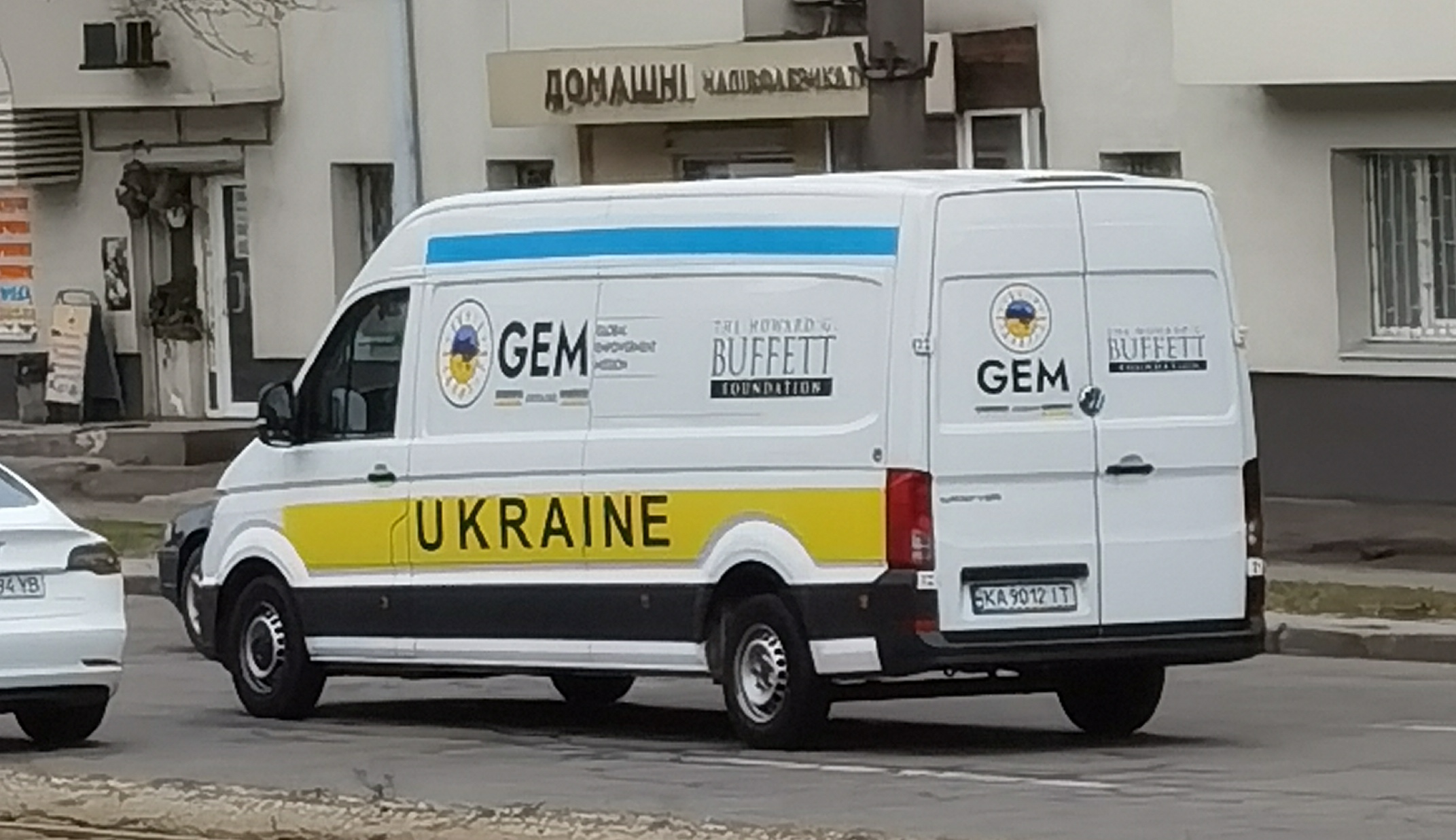
Global Empowerment Mission van in Dnipro, Ukraine, during war.

In response to Hurricane Maria in 2017, Capponi partnered with Bethenny Frankel, Will Smith and other celebrities to provide logistical aid in Puerto Rico to people affected by the hurricane. Global Empowerment Mission organized warehouse storage space, chartered flights, and transportation for food and material aid donated from elsewhere in the United States.

In 2017, Global Empowerment Mission became the official partner of Bethenny Frankel’s bstrong initiative. They have sent over $34 million in supplies to disaster relief missions around the globe including the United States, Caribbean Islands, South America and Australia.

As of 2025, Capponi’s non-profit organization, Global Empowerment Mission (GEM), has grown to become a $162,727,980 dollar organization, per its 2024 tax filing. His organization has participated in over 382 disaster relief missions in 74 countries and all 50 states. Notable recent missions include coordinating large-scale relief efforts for Hurricane Helene and Hurricane Milton in the Southeastern United States (2024), as well as on-the-ground responses to the January 2025 LA County Wildfires and the July 2025 Texas Flooding.

Capponi has led disaster relief efforts for:

- Hurricane Matthew
- Hurricane Maria
- Hurricane Dorian
- 2018 Volcán de Fuego eruption
- Camp Fire (2018)
- 2019-20 Australian bushfire season
- Hurricane Florence
- Hurricane Michael
- The Venezuelan refugee crisis
- Dixie Fire
- 2021 Haiti earthquake
- Cyclone Idai
- COVID-19 pandemic
- February 13–17, 2021 North American winter storm
- Surfside condominium collapse
- Russo-Ukrainian War
- 2022 Pakistan floods
- 2023 Turkey–Syria earthquakes
- Destruction of the Kakhovka Dam
- 2023 Hawaii wildfires
- Gaza war
- Hurricane Otis
- 2024 Texas wildfires
- Hurricane Helene
- LA County Fires
- Texas Floods
- Hurricane Melissa

== Personal life ==
By the 1990s, Capponi had developed an $800-per-day heroin habit. By 1995, he was homeless in New York City. At his father's suggestion, Capponi entered a methadone program in Belgium; he fell into a coma soon after starting, and had to undergo surgery to remove a benign brain tumour. He then went through a detox program in Canada, before returning to Miami Beach. In the 1990s, he was close friends with Chris Paciello, with whom he owned music production company C&P Music. He credits Paciello with getting him off heroin by sending him to a detox center.

On March 20, 2015, he was at the helm of his 25-foot Chris-Craft Corsair motorboat when he fainted, he reported; The boat slammed head-on into a seawall. The accident seriously injured Capponi and a female passenger. Capponi suffered a broken nose, broken ribs, and a broken collarbone; his passenger suffered serious head injuries, was in a coma for three weeks, and lost much of her short-term memory. The final report of the Florida Fish and Wildlife Conservation Commission on the accident stated that "neither victim was cited and that no alcohol or drugs were found in the couple's systems, aside from the medication given to them at the hospital. Capponi's insurer claimed that he had failed to advise them of being convicted on a DUI charge in 2003 and hence had benefited from a lower premium. The insurer's case that they were not liable for damages was dismissed.
