= Giovannantonio =

Giovannantonio is a masculine blended given name that is a combination of Gianni and Antonio. Notable people known by this name include the following:

- Giovannantonio Cipriani (1824–1906), Italian political activist
- Giovanantonio Tagliente, alternate name for Giovanni Antonio Tagliente (c. 1460s - c. 1528), Italian calligrapher, author, printer and publisher

== See also ==
- Giovan Antonio
- Giovanni Antonio
