= Andrea Caputo =

Italian Roman Catholic prelate

Most Reverend Andrea Caputo
- Bishop of Lettere-Gragnano
- Church: Catholic Church
- Diocese: Diocese of Lettere-Gragnano
- In office: 1625–1650
- Predecessor: Francesco Brusco
- Successor: Onofrio de Ponte

Orders
- Consecration: 31 July 1622 by Marco Antonio Gozzadini

Personal details
- Born: Naples, Italy
- Died: March 1650 Lettere, Italy

Andrea Caputo (died March 1650) was a Roman Catholic prelate who served as Bishop of Lettere-Gragnano (1625–1650) and Titular Bishop of Constantia in Arabia (1622–1625).

== Biography ==
Andrea Caputo was born in Naples, Italy. On 11 July 1622, Andrea Caputo was appointed during the papacy of Pope Gregory XV as Coadjutor Bishop of Lettere-Gragnano and Titular Bishop of Constantia in Arabia. On 31 July 1622, he was consecrated bishop by Marco Antonio Gozzadini, Cardinal-Priest of Sant'Eusebio, with Baldassare Cagliares, Bishop of Malta, and Alessandro Bosco, Bishop of Carinola, serving as co-consecrators. In 1625, he succeeded to the bishopric of Lettere-Gragnano. He served as Bishop of Lettere-Gragnano until his death in March 1650.

While bishop, he was the principal co-consecrator of Antonio Bonfiglioli, Bishop of Carinola (1622); and Giacinto Petroni, Bishop of Molfetta (1622).

== See also ==
- Catholic Church in Italy

== External links and additional sources ==
- Cheney, David M. "Constantia in Arabia (Titular See)". Catholic-Hierarchy.org. (for Chronology of Bishops) ^{[self-published]}
- Chow, Gabriel. "Titular Episcopal See of Constantia in Arabia (Syria)". GCatholic.org. (for Chronology of Bishops) ^{[self-published]}
- Cheney, David M. "Diocese of Lettere (-Gragnano)". Catholic-Hierarchy.org. (for Chronology of Bishops) ^{[self-published]}
- Chow, Gabriel. "Titular Episcopal See of Lettere (Italy)". GCatholic.org. (for Chronology of Bishops) ^{[self-published]}

Catholic Church titles
Preceded by	Titular Bishop of Constantia in Arabia; 1622–1625	Succeeded by
Preceded by Francesco Brusco	Bishop of Lettere-Gragnano; 1625–1650	Succeeded by Onofrio de Ponte
