= Emmanuel Villanis =

French sculptor

Emmanuel Villanis (12 December 1858 - 28 August 1914) was a French sculptor. He was born in Lille, France, and died in Paris.

He studied at the Accademia Albertina in Turin, where one of his teachers was Odoardo Tabacchi. In 1885, Villanis lived in Paris and became one of the most productive sculptors towards the end of the 19th century. His female bronze busts, cast by the Society de Bronze de Paris, were exported all over the world from Paris, particularly to the United States. Today his sculptures can be found regularly at auctions.

He is believed to have created some 200 to 250 pieces. His body of work consisted of busts and full body statues. The majority of these were cast in bronze, but there are also models in white metal, Spelter and Terra Cotta.

Today he is recognised as a sculptor of the Art Nouveau era and is his work is sought after by collectors.
