= Chris-Craft Boats =

Historic boat manufacturer

Coordinates: 42.6132735°N 82.5453808°W

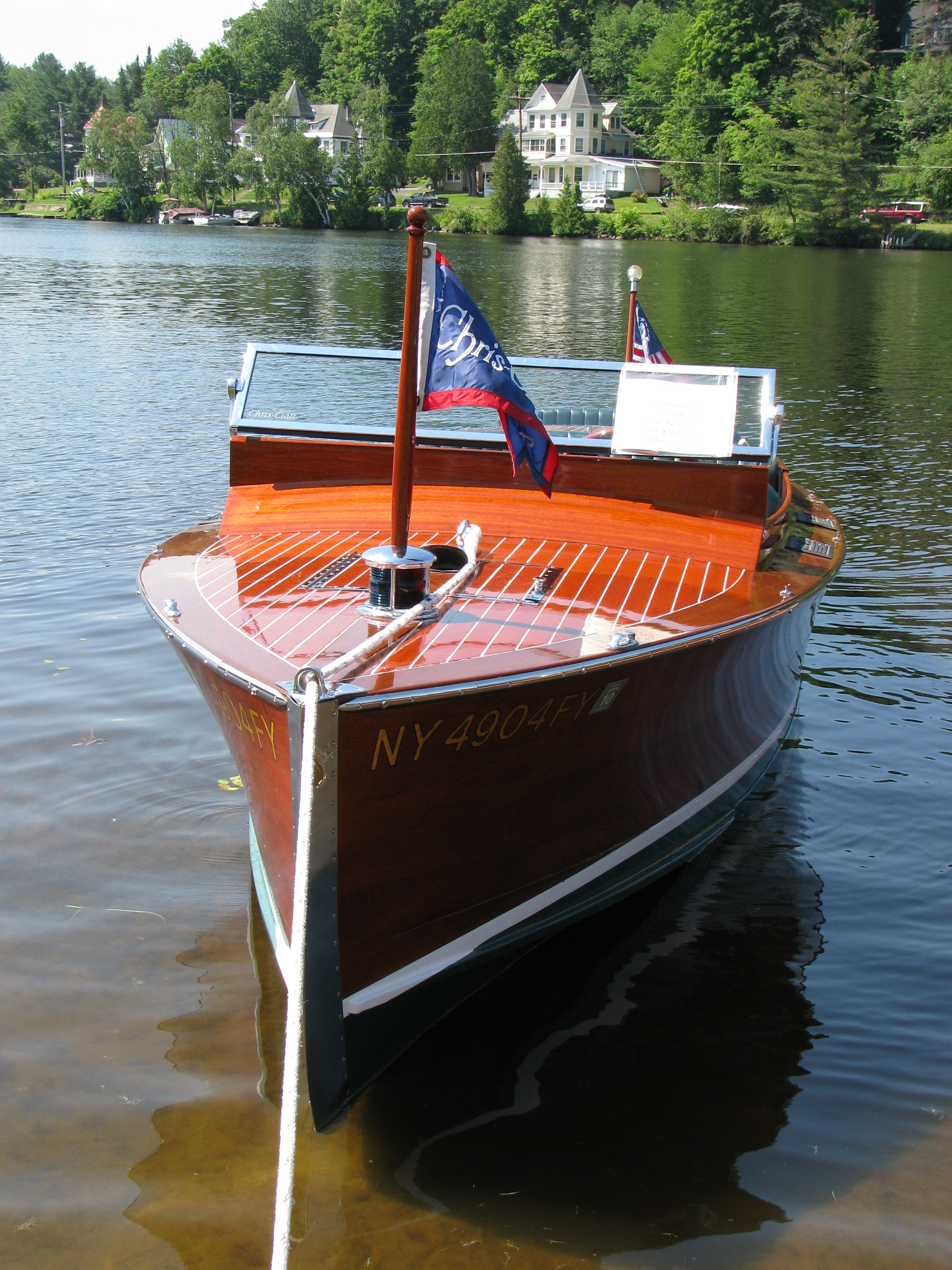
- 1928 Chris-Craft Cadet
- Formerly: Smith Ryan Boat Company (1910–1922); Chris Smith & Sons Boat Company (1922–1924); Chris-Craft (1924–2000)
- Type: Private
- Industry: Boat building
- Founded: 1874; 152 years ago
- Founder: Christopher Columbus Smith
- Defunct: 2000; 26 years ago
- Fate: Defunct
- Successor: Chris-Craft Corporation
- Headquarters: Algonac, Michigan
- Products: Boats
- Owners: Smith family (1874–1910, 1922–1960); Smith brothers and partners (1910–1922)
- Parent: NAFI/Chris-Craft Industries (1960–1981); Murray Industries (1981–1989); Outboard Marine Corporation (1989–2000); Winnebago (2018–present)
- Divisions: Roamer Steel Boats Division

Chris-Craft Boats was an American boat manufacturer founded by Christopher Columbus Smith (1861–1939). The company was sold by the Smith family in 1960 to NAFI Corporation, which changed its name to Chris-Craft Industries in 1962. The current successor is Chris-Craft Corporation, which produces motorboats under the Chris-Craft name.

== History ==
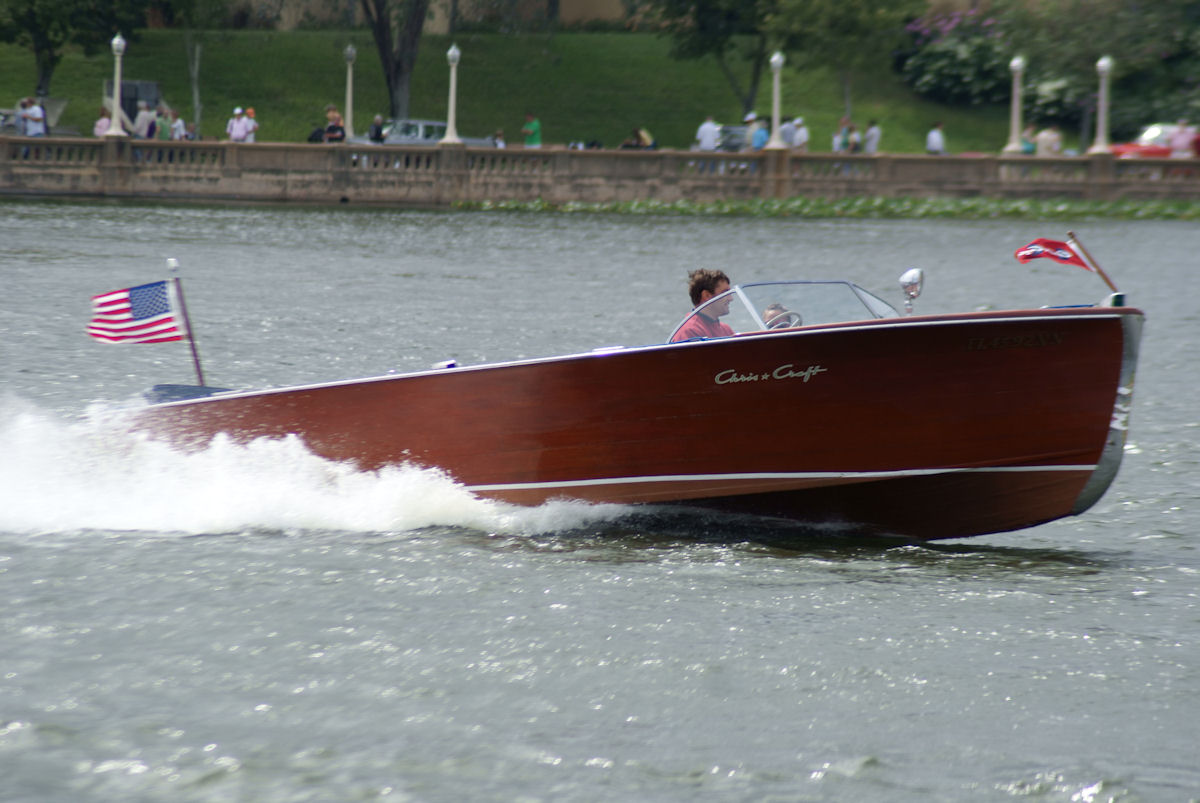
1945 Chris-Craft runabout

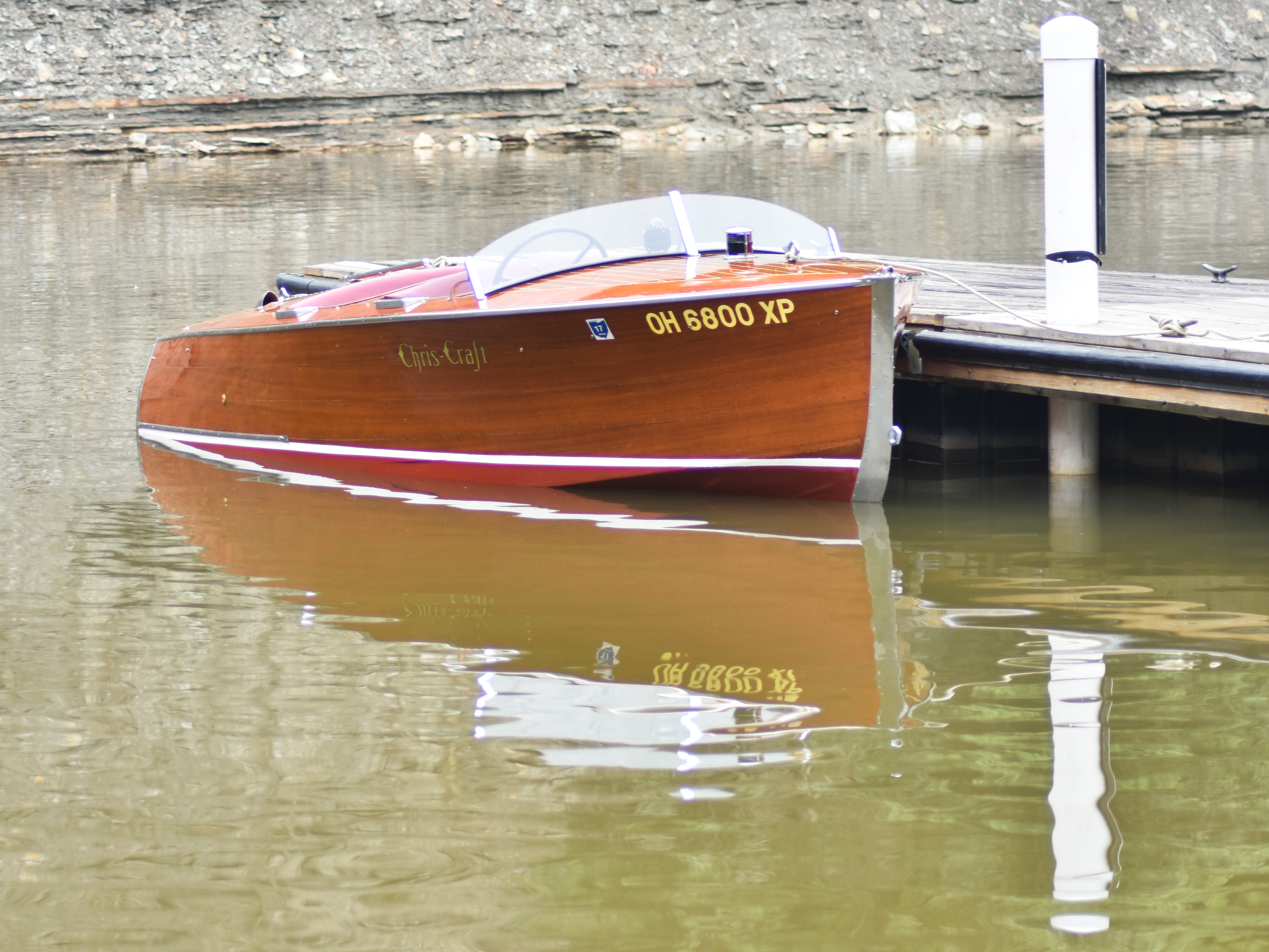
Twin-cockpit runabout

Chris Smith built his first wooden boat in 1874 at the age of 13. Years later, he built a duck hunting boat. His friends liked the way he built them, and they asked him to build them one. This was technically the start of the boat company. He soon began to build more boats and joined his brother Hank in 1881 to begin producing boats full-time.

In 1910, the brothers joined with other partners to form the Smith Ryan Boat Company. The firm's name was changed in 1922 to Chris Smith & Sons Boat Company, then to Chris-Craft in 1924. The Detroit-area company became well known for its sleek racing boats in the 1910s and 1920s. Chris-Craft sold high-end powerboats to wealthy patrons such as Henry Ford and William Randolph Hearst.

In the late 1920s, Chris-Craft extended its market into the middle class when it became one of the first mass-producers of civilian pleasure boats. Formerly, most powerboats had been hand-built. The company began assembly line production at their plant in Algonac, Michigan, on the St. Clair River, dramatically lowering production costs. Engines were supplied by both Ford and Chrysler, and by the Hercules Engine Company in later models.

In 1927, the company introduced the Cadet, an affordable 22' runabout. At the time, the domain of speedboats was largely confined to the wealthy. Its innovative advertising campaign promised a piece of "the good life" to the growing American middle class. The company sold its boats on an installment plan, making them among the first powerboats available to the general population.

The Great Depression robbed many Americans of discretionary income, and Chris-Craft sales suffered. The company introduced a line of low-priced powerboats to stay solvent. By 1935, a 15.5' utility boat sold for as little as US$406 ($9,534 in 2025 dollars). During World War II, the company produced small patrol boats and launches for the U.S. Navy.

After the war, Chris-Craft introduced a new lineup of civilian pleasure boats in time for the massive American consumer expansion of the 1950s. That decade marked the height of company prestige, and the Chris-Craft brand name became virtually synonymous with pleasure boating. The company offered 159 different models, and it was the sales leader in many categories of small civilian powerboats. One of the most popular Chris-Craft boats is the 1955 21' Chris-Craft Cobra.

Chris Crafts were considered to be among the finest available, popular with famous customers such as Dean Martin, Katharine Hepburn, Frank Sinatra, and Elvis Presley. Made from mahogany and featuring liberal teak and brass, they were easy to operate by weekend boaters.

Chris-Craft manufactured its first fiberglass boat by 1955. The company added a metal boat division in 1957, designated as the Roamer Steel Boats Division (RSBD). This was founded upon its purchase of the Roamer Boat Company, and the boats became known as Chris Craft Roamers.

The company was acquired by Shields & Company's NAFI Corporation in 1960, but continued to operate independently. Chris-Craft Industries sold its boat division to Murray Industries in 1981, while retaining the Chris-Craft trademark and licensed it to Murray. Outboard Marine Corporation acquired the boat company in 1989, then went into bankruptcy in 2000 and was purchased by Genmar Holdings. Genmar sold the Chris-Craft boat division to Stellican Ltd., then Stellican purchased the Chris-Craft trademark from News Corporation, thus reuniting the two parts of the boat company.
