= Roman Catholic Diocese of Lettere-Gragnano =

The Roman Catholic Diocese of Lettere was a Latin Catholic diocese located in the commune of Lettere in what is now the Metropolitan City of Naples, in the southern-central Italian region Campania. The distance by road from Naples to Lettere is 33 kilometers (20 miles). In 1818, it was merged into the Diocese of Castellammare di Stabia.

== History ==
The Diocese of Lettere, Latin Name: Litteræ (adjective Litterensis) was established in 994, on territory split off from Diocese of Amalfi, near the site of Ancient Liternum. It was a suffragan diocese of Amalfi.

The date, however, is controversial, depending on the circumstances surrounding the elevation of the diocese of Amalfi to metropolitan status. Evidence comes from the "Chronicon Archiepiscoporum Amalphitanorum," found in the papers of the notary Ferdinand de Rosa. But the chronicle is inconsistent in names, dates, and facts. Ughelli presented an emended version of the text, and came to the conclusion that the correct date of the foundation of the archiepiscopate and the diocese of Lettere was 994. but "Sergius III" in the chronicle must become "Ioannes XV." The appointment of bishop Sergius to "regimine" must become "Reginnis" or "Regimine." It is not said by the chronicle when Stephanus was consecrated bishop of Castella Stabienses, now called Litterae, only that it was after the return of Archbishop Leo from Rome.

The diocese of Lettere, in 1169, added to its title coastal hill town Gragnano, 4.5 km (2.8 mi) to the southwest.

The new cathedral was built by Bishop Bartolomeo Ferro, O.P. (1567–1570). On 28 July 1570, Pope Pius V granted permission to move the episcopal seat, the Chapter, and the sacred relics to the new building. The cathedral, dedicated to the taking up of the body of the Virgin Mary into heaven, was served and administered by an ecclesiastical body called the Chapter, which consisted, in 1767, of four dignities (the Archdeacon, the Primicerius, the Cantor, and the Treasurer) and eleven canons.

=== Reorganization of 1818 ===
Following the extinction of the Napoleonic Kingdom of Italy, the Congress of Vienna authorized the restoration of the Papal States and the Kingdom of Naples. Since the French occupation had seen the abolition of many Church institutions in the kingdom, as well as the confiscation of most Church property and resources, it was imperative that Pope Pius VII and King Ferdinand IV reach agreement on restoration and restitution. Ferdinand, however, was not prepared to accept the pre-Napoleonic situation, in which Naples was a feudal subject of the papacy. Lengthy, detailed, and acrimonious negotiations ensued.

In 1818, a new concordat with the Kingdom of the Two Sicilies committed the pope to the suppression of more than fifty small dioceses in the kingdom. Pope Pius VII united the Diocese of Lettere, the ancient Liternum, with Castellammare.

In 1968, the name, but not the diocese, was revived as the titular episcopal see of Lettere

== Bishops ==
=== Diocese of Lettere ===
Erected: 994
Latin Name: Litterensis

- Stephanus (994)

...

- Petrus (1118)

...

- Petrus (c. 1169)
- Joannes (c. 1179)

...

- Jacobus (c. 1289)
- Petrus (c. 1300)
- Rao (c. 1311)

...

- Pietro (1327–1349)
- Giacomo Gioia, O.F.M. (1349–1365)
- Roberto De Casalinovo, O.F.M. (1366–1371)
- Giuliano, O.F.M. (1371–1380)
- Nicolas Balasae de Sisto, O.E.S.A. (1384– after 1390) Avignon Obedience
- Tommaso (1384–1392) Roman Obedience
- Giovanni Da Pisa, O.P. (1392–1403) Roman Obedience
- Giacomo (1403–1407?)
- Francesco (1407–1427)
- Cicco (1428–1440)
- Antonio de Celano (1440–1455)
- Gabriele Pontangeli (1455–1478)
- Antonio de Miraballis (1478–1503)
- Andrea Curiale (1503–1517 Resigned)
- Valentino d'Apreja (De Apreis) (1517–1539)
- Bartolomeo Capobianco (1540–1547)
- Giovanni Antonio Pandosi (De Pantusa) (1547–1562)
- Sebastiano Leccavella, O.P. (1562–1565 Resigned)
- Giovanni Antonio Astorch (Astorco) (1565–1567)
- Bartolomeo Ferro, O.P. (1567–1570)
- Filippo Fasio Capponi (1570–1570 Died)
- Aurelio Griani, O.F.M. (1570–1576)
- Giovanni Bernardino Grandopoli (1576–1590)
- Giovanni Leonardo Bottiglieri (1591–1599)
- Francesco Brusco, O.F.M.Conv. (1599–1625)
- Andrea Caputo (1625–1650)
- Onofrio de Ponte (1650–1676)
- Antonio Molinari (1676–1698 Died)
- Giovanni Cito (1698–1708)
- Domenico Antonio Gagliano, O.Theat. (1709–1713)
- Domenico Galisio (1718–1730)
- Francesco Castelli (1730–1733)
- Agostino Giannini (1733–1767)
- Francesco d'Afflitto (1767–1786)
- Bartolomeo Criscuolo (1792–1793)
- Bernardo Maria della Torre (1797–1818)

1818: The diocese was suppressed, its territory added to the Diocese of Castellammare di Stabia

== Titular see ==
In December 1968, the name of the diocese, but not the diocese itself, was revived, as the Titular bishopric of Lettere.

The following prelates have held the title:

- Giovanni Battista Cesana, M.C.C.J. (19 December 1968–12 June 1991), in retirement.
- Luigi Travaglino (4 April 1992 – ...) As a papal nuncio, he held the title Archbishop

== See also ==
- Archdiocese of Amalfi-Cava de' Tirreni
- List of Catholic dioceses in Italy
- Catholic Church in Italy

== Sources ==
=== Reference works ===
- Eubel, Conradus, ed. (1913). Hierarchia catholica (in Latin). Vol. 1 (Tomus 1) (second ed.). Münster: Libreria Regensbergiana. p. 309.. Archived.
- Eubel, Conradus, ed. (1914). Hierarchia catholica (in Latin). Vol. 2 (Tomus 2) (second ed.). Münster: Libreria Regensbergiana. p. 179.. Archived.
- Eubel, Conradus, ed. (1923). Hierarchia catholica (in Latin). Vol. 3 (Tomus 3) (second ed.). Münster: Libreria Regensbergiana. pp. 226–227.. Archived.
- Gams, Pius Bonifatius (1873). Series episcoporum Ecclesiae catholicae: quotquot innotuerunt a beato Petro apostolo. Ratisbon: Typis et Sumptibus Georgii Josephi Manz. pp. 890-891. (Use with caution; obsolete)
- Gauchat, Patritius (Patrice) (1935). Hierarchia catholica (in Latin). Vol. IV (1592-1667). Münster: Libraria Regensbergiana.
- Ritzler, Remigius; Sefrin, Pirminus (1952). Hierarchia catholica medii et recentis aevi (in Latin). Vol. V (1667-1730). Patavii: Messagero di S. Antonio.
- Ritzler, Remigius; Sefrin, Pirminus (1958). Hierarchia catholica medii et recentis aevi (in Latin). Vol. VI (1730-1799). Patavii: Messagero di S. Antonio. p. 264.

=== Studies ===
- Cappelletti, Giuseppe (1864). Le chiese d'Italia: dalla loro origine sino ai nostri giorni (in Italian). Vol. Tomo decimonono (19). Venice: G. Antonelli. pp. 814–826.
- Kehr, Paulus Fridolinus (1935). Italia pontificia. Vol. VIII: Regnum Normannorum—Campania Berlin: Weidmann. (in Latin)
- Ughelli, Ferdinando; Coleti, NIccolo (1721). Italia sacra sive De episcopis Italiæ, et insularum adjacentium (in Latin). Vol. Tomus septimus (7). Venice: apud Sebastianum Coleti. pp. 270–281.

==== External links ====
- GCatholic - data for all sections
- Chow, Gabriel. "Titular Episcopal See of Lettere (Italy)". GCatholic.org.
