= Onofrio de Ponte =

Italian Roman Catholic prelate

Most Reverend Onofrio de Ponte
- Bishop of Lettere-Gragnano
- Church: Catholic Church
- Diocese: Diocese of Lettere-Gragnano
- In office: 1650–1676
- Predecessor: Andrea Caputo
- Successor: Antonio Molinari (bishop)

Personal details
- Died: 13 May 1676

Onofrio de Ponte (died 1676) was a Roman Catholic prelate who served as Bishop of Lettere-Gragnano (1650–1676).

== Biography ==
On 22 August 1650, Onofrio de Ponte was appointed during the papacy of Pope Innocent X as Bishop of Lettere-Gragnano. He served as Bishop of Lettere-Gragnano until his death on 13 May 1676.

== External links and additional sources ==
- Cheney, David M. "Diocese of Lettere (-Gragnano)". Catholic-Hierarchy.org. (for Chronology of Bishops) ^{[self-published]}
- Chow, Gabriel. "Titular Episcopal See of Lettere (Italy)". GCatholic.org. (for Chronology of Bishops) ^{[self-published]}

Catholic Church titles
Preceded by Andrea Caputo	Bishop of Lettere-Gragnano; 1650–1676	Succeeded by Antonio Molinari (bishop)
