= Antonio de Celano =

Most Reverend Antonio de Celano
- Bishop of Lettere-Gragnano
- Church: Catholic Church
- Diocese: Diocese of Lettere-Gragnano
- In office: 1440–1455
- Successor: Gabriele Pontangeli

Personal details
- Died: 1455

Antonio de Celano (died 1455) was a Roman Catholic prelate who served as Bishop of Lettere-Gragnano (1440–1455).

== Biography ==
On 26 September 1440, Antonio de Celano was appointed during the papacy of Pope Eugene IV as Bishop of Lettere-Gragnano. He served as Bishop of Lettere-Gragnano until his death in 1455.

== External links and additional sources ==
- Cheney, David M. "Diocese of Lettere (-Gragnano)". Catholic-Hierarchy.org. (for Chronology of Bishops) ^{[self-published]}
- Chow, Gabriel. "Titular Episcopal See of Lettere (Italy)". GCatholic.org. (for Chronology of Bishops) ^{[self-published]}

Catholic Church titles
Preceded by	Bishop of Lettere-Gragnano; 1440–1455	Succeeded by Gabriele Pontangeli
