= Caponi =

Caponi is an Italian surname. Notable people with the surname include:

- Aldo Caponi (born 1939), better known as Don Backy, Italian singer, songwriter, and actor
- Donna Caponi (born 1945), American golfer
- Linda Caponi (born 1998), Italian swimmer
- Marco Antonio Caponi (born 1983), Argentine actor

== See also ==
- Capponi, another surname
