= Valentino d'Apreja =

Italian Roman Catholic prelate

Most Reverend Valentino d'Apreja
- Bishop of Lettere-Gragnano
- Church: Catholic Church
- Diocese: Diocese of Lettere-Gragnano
- In office: 1517–1539
- Predecessor: Andrea Curiale
- Successor: Bartolomeo Capobianco

Personal details
- Died: 1539

Valentino d'Apreja or Valentino de Apreis (died 1539) was a Roman Catholic prelate who served as Bishop of Lettere-Gragnano (1517–1539).

== Biography ==
On 23 March 1517, Valentino d'Apreja was appointed during the papacy of Pope Leo X as Bishop of Lettere-Gragnano. He served as Bishop of Lettere-Gragnano until his death in 1539.

== External links and additional sources ==
- Cheney, David M. "Diocese of Lettere (-Gragnano)". Catholic-Hierarchy.org. (for Chronology of Bishops) ^{[self-published]}
- Chow, Gabriel. "Titular Episcopal See of Lettere (Italy)". GCatholic.org. (for Chronology of Bishops) ^{[self-published]}

Catholic Church titles
| Preceded by Andrea Curiale | Bishop of Lettere-Gragnano; 1517–1539 | Succeeded by Bartolomeo Capobianco |
