= Bartolomeo Capobianco =

Italian Roman Catholic prelate

Most Reverend Bartolomeo Capobianco
- Bishop of Lettere-Gragnano
- Church: Catholic Church
- Diocese: Diocese of Lettere-Gragnano
- In office: 1540–1547
- Predecessor: Valentino d'Apreja
- Successor: Giovanni Antonio Pandosi

Personal details
- Died: 1547

Bartolomeo Capobianco (died 1547) was a Roman Catholic prelate who served as Bishop of Lettere-Gragnano (1540–1547).

== Biography ==
On 8 January 1540, Bartolomeo Capobianco was appointed during the papacy of Pope Paul III as Bishop of Lettere-Gragnano. He served as Bishop of Lettere-Gragnano until his death in 1547.

== External links and additional sources ==
- Cheney, David M. "Diocese of Lettere (-Gragnano)". Catholic-Hierarchy.org. (for Chronology of Bishops) ^{[self-published]}
- Chow, Gabriel. "Titular Episcopal See of Lettere (Italy)". GCatholic.org. (for Chronology of Bishops) ^{[self-published]}

Catholic Church titles
Preceded by Valentino d'Apreja	Bishop of Lettere-Gragnano; 1540–1547	Succeeded by Giovanni Antonio Pandosi
