= Francesco Brusco =

Italian Roman Catholic prelate

Most Reverend Francesco Brusco
- Bishop of Lettere-Gragnano
- Church: Catholic Church
- Diocese: Diocese of Lettere-Gragnano
- In office: 1599–1625
- Predecessor: Giovanni Leonardo Bottiglieri
- Successor: Andrea Caputo

Personal details
- Died: 1625

Francesco Brusco (died 1625) was a Roman Catholic prelate who served as Bishop of Lettere-Gragnano (1599–1625).

== Biography ==
On 27 September 1599, Francesco Brusco was appointed during the papacy of Pope Clement VIII as Bishop of Lettere-Gragnano. He served as Bishop of Lettere-Gragnano until his death in 1625.

== External links and additional sources ==
- Cheney, David M. "Diocese of Lettere (-Gragnano)". Catholic-Hierarchy.org. (for Chronology of Bishops) ^{[self-published]}
- Chow, Gabriel. "Titular Episcopal See of Lettere (Italy)". GCatholic.org. (for Chronology of Bishops) ^{[self-published]}

Catholic Church titles
Preceded by Giovanni Leonardo Bottiglieri	Bishop of Lettere-Gragnano; 1599–1625	Succeeded by Andrea Caputo
