= Giovanni Leonardo Bottiglieri =

Italian Roman Catholic prelate

Most Reverend Giovanni Leonardo Bottiglieri
- Bishop of Lettere-Gragnano
- Church: Catholic Church
- Diocese: Diocese of Lettere-Gragnano
- In office: 1591–1599
- Predecessor: Giovanni Bernardino Grandopoli
- Successor: Francesco Brusco

Orders
- Consecration: 3 February 1591 by Filippo Spinola

Personal details
- Died: 1599 Lettere, Italy

Giovanni Leonardo Bottiglieri (died 1599) was a Roman Catholic prelate who served as Bishop of Lettere-Gragnano (1591–1599).

== Biography ==
On 14 January 1591, Giovanni Leonardo Bottiglieri was appointed during the papacy of Pope Gregory XIV as Bishop of Lettere-Gragnano. On 3 February 1591, he was consecrated bishop by Filippo Spinola, Cardinal-Priest of Santa Sabina, with César Alamagna Cardona, Bishop of Cava de' Tirreni, and Owen Lewis (bishop), Bishop of Cassano all'Jonio, serving as co-consecrators. He served as Bishop of Lettere-Gragnano until his death in 1599.

== External links and additional sources ==
- Cheney, David M. "Diocese of Lettere (-Gragnano)". Catholic-Hierarchy.org. (for Chronology of Bishops) ^{[self-published]}
- Chow, Gabriel. "Titular Episcopal See of Lettere (Italy)". GCatholic.org. (for Chronology of Bishops) ^{[self-published]}

Catholic Church titles
Preceded by Giovanni Bernardino Grandopoli	Bishop of Lettere-Gragnano; 1591–1599	Succeeded by Francesco Brusco
