= Aurelio Griani =

Italian Roman Catholic prelate

The Most Reverend Aurelio Griani
- Bishop of Lettere-Gragnano
- Church: Catholic Church
- Diocese: Diocese of Lettere-Gragnano
- In office: 1570–1576
- Predecessor: Filippo Fasio Capponi
- Successor: Giovanni Bernardino Grandopoli

Orders
- Consecration: 19 November 1570 by Scipione Rebiba

Personal details
- Died: 1576 Lettere, Italy

Aurelio Griani (died 1576) was a Roman Catholic prelate who served as Bishop of Lettere-Gragnano (1570–1576).

== Biography ==
Aurelio Griani was ordained a priest in the Order of Friars Minor. On 8 November 1570, he was appointed during the papacy of Pope Pius V as Bishop of Lettere-Gragnano. On 19 November 1570, he was consecrated bishop by Scipione Rebiba, Cardinal-Priest of Santa Maria in Trastevere, with Nicola Perusco, Bishop of Civita Castellana e Orte, and Francesco Rusticucci, Bishop of Fano, serving as co-consecrators. He served as Bishop of Lettere-Gragnano until his death in 1576.

== External links and additional sources ==
- Cheney, David M. "Diocese of Lettere (-Gragnano)". Catholic-Hierarchy.org. (for Chronology of Bishops) ^{[self-published]}
- Chow, Gabriel. "Titular Episcopal See of Lettere (Italy)". GCatholic.org. (for Chronology of Bishops) ^{[self-published]}

Catholic Church titles
Preceded by Filippo Fasio Capponi	Bishop of Lettere-Gragnano; 1570–1576	Succeeded by Giovanni Bernardino Grandopoli
