= Giovanni Antonio Astorch =

Roman Catholic bishop

Most Reverend Giovanni Antonio Astorch
- Bishop of Lettere-Gragnano
- Church: Catholic Church
- Diocese: Diocese of Lettere-Gragnano
- In office: 1565–1567
- Predecessor: Sebastiano Leccavella
- Successor: Bartolomeo Ferro

Personal details
- Died: 1567

Giovanni Antonio Astorch or Giovanni Antonio Astorco (died 1567) was a Roman Catholic prelate who served as Bishop of Lettere-Gragnano (1565–1567).

== Biography ==
On 7 November 1565, Giovanni Antonio Astorch was appointed during the papacy of Pope Pius IV as Bishop of Lettere-Gragnano. He served as Bishop of Lettere-Gragnano until his death in 1567. While bishop, he was the principal co-consecrator of Felice Peretti Montalto, Bishop of Sant'Agata de' Goti (1567).

== External links and additional sources ==
- Cheney, David M. "Diocese of Lettere (-Gragnano)". Catholic-Hierarchy.org. (for Chronology of Bishops) ^{[self-published]}
- Chow, Gabriel. "Titular Episcopal See of Lettere (Italy)". GCatholic.org. (for Chronology of Bishops) ^{[self-published]}

Catholic Church titles
Preceded by Sebastiano Leccavella	Bishop of Lettere-Gragnano; 1565–1567	Succeeded by Bartolomeo Ferro
