= Giovanni Antonio Leoni =

Italian composer

- Born: Around 1600
- Died: Shortly after 1652
- Occupation: Composer

Giovanni Antonio Leoni was a Roman violinist and composer in the 17th century. Little is known about Leoni's life besides that he was an active composer in Rome. The only major work by Leoni that is preserved is a publication in 1652, titled Sonate di violino a voce sola ... Libro primo Opera terza, a score with a violin part. Leoni explains in the preface of the piece that he previously had composed many sonatas and symphonias, and it is dedicated to cardinal Giovanni Battista Maria Pallotta. The work is a collection of thirty one sonatas for violin and basso continuo, the first known collection to be entirely dedicated to solo violin. Leoni's work as a musician is first evidenced in 1634, when he was paid to play violin for a church.
