= Giovanni Antonio Pandosi =

Italian Roman Catholic prelate

Most Reverend Giovanni Antonio Pandosi
- Bishop of Lettere-Gragnano
- Church: Catholic Church
- Diocese: Diocese of Lettere-Gragnano
- In office: 1547–1562
- Predecessor: Bartolomeo Capobianco
- Successor: Sebastiano Leccavella

Personal details
- Died: 1562 Trento, Italy

Giovanni Antonio Pandosi or Giovanni Antonio de Pantusa (died 1562) was a Roman Catholic prelate who served as Bishop of Lettere-Gragnano (1547–1562).

== Biography ==
On 8 January 1540, Giovanni Antonio Pandosi was appointed during the papacy of Pope Paul III as Bishop of Lettere-Gragnano. He served as Bishop of Lettere-Gragnano until his death in 1562 in Trento, Italy.

== External links and additional sources ==
- Cheney, David M. "Diocese of Lettere (-Gragnano)". Catholic-Hierarchy.org. (for Chronology of Bishops) ^{[self-published]}
- Chow, Gabriel. "Titular Episcopal See of Lettere (Italy)". GCatholic.org. (for Chronology of Bishops) ^{[self-published]}

Catholic Church titles
Preceded by Bartolomeo Capobianco	Bishop of Lettere-Gragnano; 1547–1562	Succeeded by Sebastiano Leccavella
