= Giovanni Antonio Licinio the younger =

Italian painter

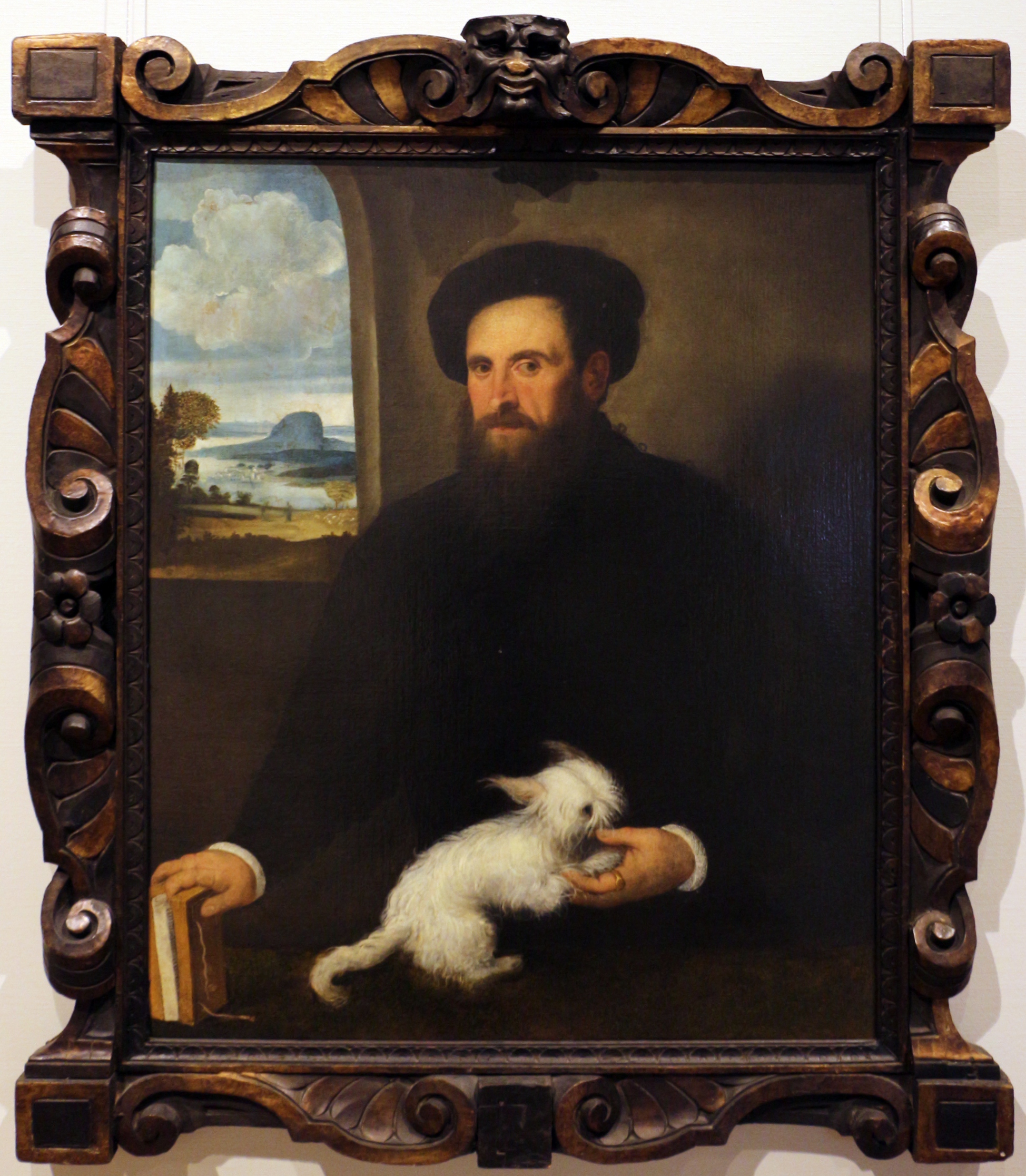
Portrait of a Gentleman with a Dog, 1530, Castello Sforzesco, Milan

Giovanni Antonio Licinio the younger (c. 1515–1576), nicknamed Il Sacchiense, was an Italian painter, a brother of Giulio Licinio, and a nephew and pupil of Il Pordenone. He died in Como, Italy.
