= Winnebago Industries =

American motorhome manufacturer

Winnebago Industries, Inc.
- Type: Public
- Traded as: NYSE: WGO; S&P 600 component
- Industry: Manufacturing
- Founded: February 12, 1958; 68 years ago in Forest City, Iowa
- Headquarters: Eden Prairie, Minnesota, U.S.
- Key people: Michael Happe (CEO)
- Products: Motorhomes; Boats
- Revenue: ▼US$2.80 billion (2025)
- Net income: ▲US$25.7 million (2025)
- Number of employees: 6,000 (2023)
- Subsidiaries: Chris-Craft Corporation; Barletta Pontoon Boats; Newmar RV; Grand Design Recreational Vehicles; Lithionics Battery
- Website: winnebagoind.com

Winnebago Industries, Inc. is an American manufacturer of motorhomes, a type of recreational vehicle (RV). In 2018, the company expanded into motorboat manufacturing with the acquisition of Chris-Craft Corporation. Winnebago has also manufactured light-to-medium utility vehicles as well as other products.

The company is named after Winnebago County, Iowa, where it was founded. The county is named after the Native American tribe who have historically lived in the area. During the 1970s and 1980s, Winnebago Industries used Native American history and traditions in naming their products, for example "Chieftain" and "Brave". They also used Native American iconography and patterns in their designs and period advertisements.

== Corporate history ==
The company was founded by Forest City, Iowa businessman John K. Hanson in February 1958. At the time, the town, located in Winnebago County, Iowa, was undergoing an economic downturn, so Hanson and a group of community leaders convinced a California firm, Modernistic Industries, to open a travel trailer factory in a bid to revive the local economy.

Surviving a rough beginning, the entire operation was purchased by five Midwesterners, with Hanson serving as president. In 1960, the name of the company was changed to Winnebago Industries. To improve quality, Winnebago Industries manufactured furniture and other components designed specifically for its travel trailers. One such innovation was the "Thermo-Panel", a strong, lightweight sidewall that was a characteristic of Winnebago products.

In 1966, the first motorhome rolled off the Winnebago Industries assembly lines. These motorhomes were sold at a price approximately half of what was being charged for competitors' models, which led to its ubiquity and popularity in the RV community. The brand name has become synonymous with "motorhome" and is commonly used as a generic trademark for such vehicles, whether they were produced by the company or not.

In March 2015, Winnebago announced that it was opening a production center to employ 70 in Waverly, Iowa, due to labor shortage issues in the Forest City area. The company now employs about 2,400 workers in Forest City, 200 in Charles City and 60 in Lake Mills, plus additional employees in Middlebury, Indiana.

In 2016 when CEO Mike Happe was brought in, Winnebago Industries established their management offices in Eden Prairie, Minnesota. In 2021 the company announced it would be relocating its corporate headquarters from Forest City, Iowa to the Eden Prairie location effective December 1, but that the company's manufacturing presence would be maintained in Forest City.

In 2019, Winnebago Industries acquired luxury RV maker Newmar.

In July 2021, Winnebago Industries announced it would purchase Barletta Pontoon Boats, a privately held maker of pontoon boats, for over $300 million.

=== Australia (1982–2015) ===
In July 2012, a Justice of the Federal Court of Australia determined that a Sydney businessman, Bruce Binns, had "intentionally hijacked" the well-known American brand "in a bold attempt to preempt Winnebago's opening its doors here". Versions of Winnebago models were manufactured in Australia by Binns's Knott Investments, using a logo which bore a striking resemblance to Winnebago's U.S. logo, from about 1982. In 1992, Winnebago and Binns signed a settlement for him to stop passing off his products as those of Winnebago, yet he continued to do so. In 1997 he registered Winnebago as a trademark in Australia. The court ordered the cancellation of this Winnebago trademark in Australia.

On appeal in 2013, Chief Justice Allsop found that "...Knott and Mr Binns had from the outset deliberately sought to obtain some connection with Winnebago and take advantage of any reputation Winnebago may have had in Australia as at 1978. However, the fact that Knott had manufactured and sold RVs under the Winnebago name in Australia for 32 years, 25 years of which was with the knowledge of Winnebago, was an unusual situation which could not be overlooked". Accordingly, Allsop held that it was appropriate that Knott be permitted to continue to use the Winnebago name and logos, provided the distinction between its business and Winnebago's was made clear.

As a result of the case, a disclaimer was required to be made clear on any vehicles made by Knott in the future, and on any advertising and promotional material. Further, all future consumers of Australian Winnebago/Avida products are required to sign a disclaimer declaring they have been made aware that they are not purchasing a United States Winnebago product. The disclaimer reads "These vehicles were not manufactured by, or by anyone having any association with, Winnebago of the United States."

In 2014, Avida RV announced they would reintroduce the Winnebago name and logo to their premium range of RV products. This announcement came just one month before Winnebago Industries announced they were entering the Australian market for the first time. Binns is currently opposing the registration of the Winnebago trademark in Australia, despite having been refused permission to hold the trademark himself.

== Products ==
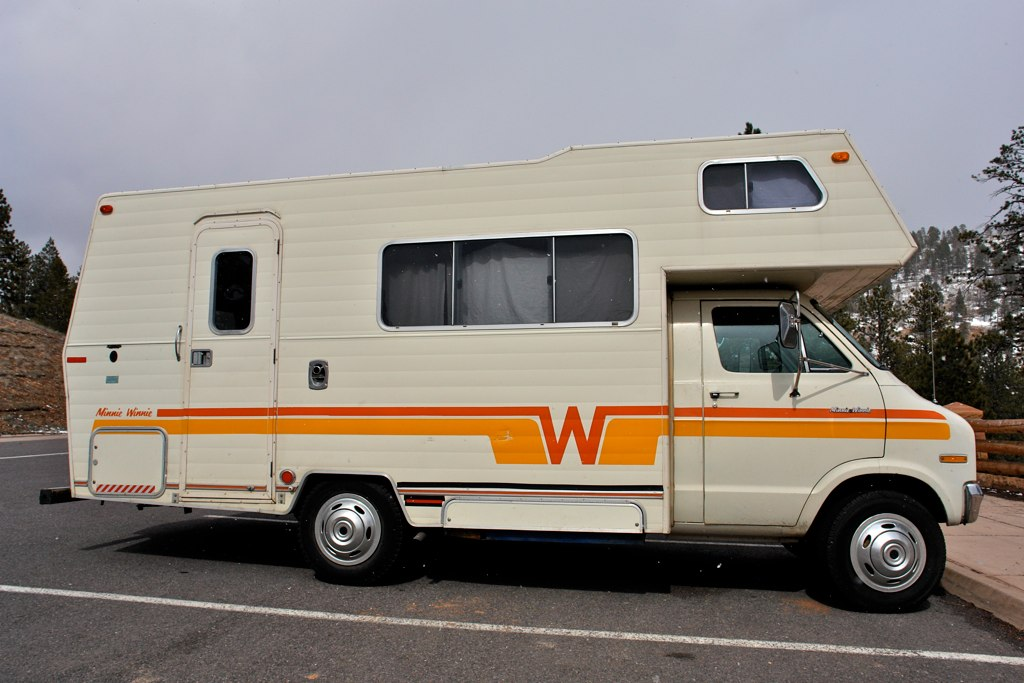
Early Dodge-based Minnie Winnie

In 1973, the company introduced a new model, the Minnie Winnie, built on the Dodge B-series van chassis. It was about 19-1/2 feet (5.9 m) long (despite the name, longer than the shortest contemporary Brave model). Longer models were added through the years. This model continued (using Chevrolet or Ford chassis after 1980) to be built into the 21st century. As fuel prices went up over time, the company continued to make smaller models available, such as the "Winnie Wagon" with a low profile and pop-top.

In the early 1970s, Orlando Helicopter Airways developed a novel RV conversion of the Sikorsky S-55 helicopter, the Heli-Camper, featuring a built-in mini-kitchen and sleeping accommodations for four. Later in that decade, Orlando developed an enhanced version based on the larger Sikorsky S-58, and participated in a joint effort with Winnebago Industries to market both aircraft as the Winnebago Heli-Home. The S-58 version featured a larger kitchenette, sleeping accommodations for six, a minibar, and an entertainment system; optional floats were offered for amphibious operations. The aircraft were featured in several American popular magazines and reportedly drew large crowds at RV shows and dealerships, but their high purchase price and prodigious fuel consumption together with rising 1970s fuel prices resulted in very limited sales; production is not well documented, but is estimated at only six or seven of the S-55 and S-58 versions combined.

In the 1980s and 1990s, Winnebago also manufactured light- and medium-duty utility vehicles using techniques and knowledge derived from motorhome production. Their "Route Van" was an aluminum-bodied step-through van with front-wheel drive. Engines were Cummins 4BTA diesel four-cylinders producing between 105 and 120 hp (78 and 89 kW). Model codes were W650, W750, W850, and W950 depending on weight rating.

The company also developed a line of smaller units slightly larger than a passenger van, built using various bodies and powerplants from two European automobile and truck manufacturers. The LeSharo was based on the Renault Trafic van with a 2.2 L 4-cylinder motor, and the "Rialta" had a Volkswagen Transporter (T4) (a.k.a. "EuroVan") cab, the 2.5-liter five-cylinder motor, 2.8-liter VR6 with 140 BHP or 2.8 V6 engine with 201 BHP. Distinct from the "Rialta", Volkswagen contracted to have the camper conversions of the T4 be done by Winnebago Industries, a radical departure from using the Germany-based Westfalia company that had become famous for building the VW Type 2 campmobile models from the 1950s through 1991. This tradition continues today with Winnebago's use of the Mercedes-Benz Sprinter and Fiat Ducato chassis.

== Cultural significance ==
The Winnebago and other motorhomes occupy a central place in American road culture, according to former English professor James B. Twitchell. When assembled together in a circle, the vehicles can be reminiscent of the covered wagons of the Old West. Choices of camping ground can vary from the slickly corporate Kampgrounds of America to the anarchistic Slab City, California.

=== In politics ===
German politician Guido Westerwelle (FDP) used a Winnebago Elanté 37 painted in the FDP colours yellow and blue and called "Guidomobil" during his campaign for the 2002 German federal election.

=== In pop culture ===
Murdoc Niccals, bassist for the British band Gorillaz, once lived in a Winnebago in Essex. The band temporarily all lived in the vehicle after their studio and living quarters collapsed. Niccals' Winnebago appeared in the music videos for DARE and Strange Timez.

In the 1979-86 CBS TV medical drama series and M*A*S*H spin-off, Trapper John, M.D., the character Dr. George Alonzo "Gonzo" Gates played by Gregory Harrison lived in a Winnebago nicknamed, "The Titanic" in the parking lot of the fictional San Francisco Memorial Hospital until about halfway through its final season when his character suffered a stroke, and he left the show.

== See also ==
- Glamping
- Recreational vehicle
- Winnebago Man
