= Giovanni Antonio Caldelli =

Italian-Swiss painter

Giovanni Antonio Caldelli (1721-1790) was an Italian-Swiss painter, active in both figure and quadratura painting.

== Biography ==
Born in Brissago in the Ticino in southern Switzerland. In Ticino, he painted for the church of San Gottardo in Intragna, and in the church of Sant'Antonio and in the Casa Orelli in Locarno. He also completed works for his own house in Brissago in 1772. He designed an altar of the Holy Virgin da Ponte (1773).

He was able to travel to the Austrian Netherlands for many years, working as both architect and decorative painter in Brussels, Antwerp, Namur, Spa, Floreffe Abbey, Sint-Truiden Abbey and Hamal Castle. He gained the patronage from Prince Charles Alexander of Lorraine and Princess Carlotta his sister.

He is said to have merit as a Pittore di grido.
