= Filippo Fasio Capponi =

Italian Roman Catholic prelate

Most Reverend Filippo Fasio Capponi
- Bishop of Lettere-Gragnano
- Church: Catholic Church
- Diocese: Diocese of Lettere-Gragnano
- In office: 1570
- Predecessor: Bartolomeo Ferro
- Successor: Aurelio Griani

Personal details
- Died: October 1570 Lettere, Italy

Filippo Fasio Capponi (died October 1570) was a Roman Catholic prelate who served as Bishop of Lettere-Gragnano (1570).

== Biography ==
On 9 June 1570, Filippo Fasio Capponi was appointed during the papacy of Pope Pius V as Bishop of Lettere-Gragnano. He served as Bishop of Lettere-Gragnano until his death in October 1570.

== See also ==
- Catholic Church in Italy

Catholic Church titles
| Preceded by Bartolomeo Ferro | Bishop of Lettere-Gragnano; 1570 | Succeeded by Aurelio Griani |
