= Andrea Curiale =

Italian Roman Catholic prelate

Most Reverend Andrea Curiale
- Bishop of Lettere-Gragnano
- Church: Catholic Church
- Diocese: Diocese of Lettere-Gragnano
- In office: 1503–1517
- Predecessor: Antonio de Miraballis
- Successor: Valentino d'Apreja

Andrea Curiale was a Roman Catholic prelate who served as Bishop of Lettere-Gragnano (1503–1517).

On 7 July 1503, Andrea Curiale was appointed during the papacy of Pope Alexander VI as Bishop of Lettere-Gragnano. He served as Bishop of Lettere-Gragnano until his resignation in 1517.

== External links and additional sources ==
- Cheney, David M. "Diocese of Lettere (-Gragnano)". Catholic-Hierarchy.org. (for Chronology of Bishops) ^{[self-published]}
- Chow, Gabriel. "Titular Episcopal See of Lettere (Italy)". GCatholic.org. (for Chronology of Bishops) ^{[self-published]}

Catholic Church titles
Preceded by Antonio de Miraballis	Bishop of Lettere-Gragnano; 1503–1517	Succeeded by Valentino d'Apreja
