= Antonio Molinari (bishop) =

Italian Roman Catholic prelate

Most Reverend Antonio Molinari
- Bishop of Lettere-Gragnano
- Church: Catholic Church
- Diocese: Diocese of Lettere-Gragnano
- In office: 1676–1698
- Predecessor: Onofrio de Ponte
- Successor: Giovanni Cito

Orders
- Ordination: 8 April 1651
- Consecration: 6 December 1676 by Giacomo Franzoni

Personal details
- Born: 1626 Genoa, Italy
- Died: 11 July 1698 (age 72)

Antonio Molinari (1626 – 11 July 1698) was a Roman Catholic prelate who served as Bishop of Lettere-Gragnano (1676–1698).

== Biography ==
Antonio Molinari was born in Genoa, Italy in 1626 and ordained a priest on 8 April 1651. On 2 December 1676, he was appointed during the papacy of Pope Innocent XII as Bishop of Lettere-Gragnano. On 6 December 1676, he was consecrated bishop by Giacomo Franzoni, Bishop of Camerino, with Francesco de' Marini, Titular Archbishop of Teodosia, and Domenico Gianuzzi, Titular Bishop of Dioclea in Phrygia, serving as co-consecrators. He served as Bishop of Lettere-Gragnano until his death on 11 July 1698.

== External links and additional sources ==
- Cheney, David M. "Diocese of Lettere (-Gragnano)". Catholic-Hierarchy.org. (for Chronology of Bishops) ^{[self-published]}
- Chow, Gabriel. "Titular Episcopal See of Lettere (Italy)". GCatholic.org. (for Chronology of Bishops) ^{[self-published]}

Catholic Church titles
Preceded by Onofrio de Ponte	Bishop of Lettere-Gragnano; 1676–1698	Succeeded by Giovanni Cito
