= Angelo Pietrasanta =

Italian painter (1837–1876)

Angelo Pietrasanta (1837–1876) was an Italian painter, mainly of historical canvases.

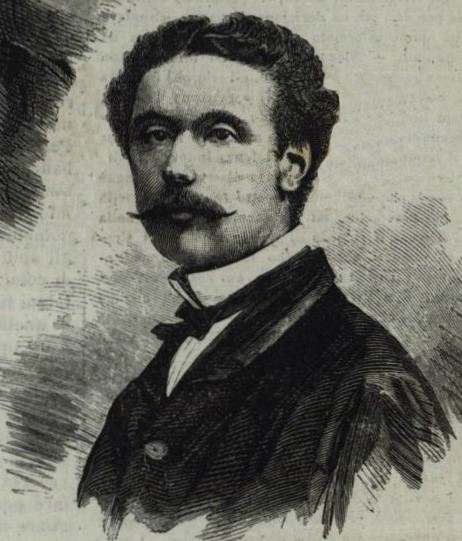
Portrait of Angelo Pietrasanta

He was born in Codogno, and died in Milan. He was a pupil of Francesco Hayez at the Academy of Fine Arts in Milan. In 1879, he sent to the Exhibition of Parma an oil canvas depicting Lucrezia Borgia che d'accordo col fratello Duca Valentino, avvelena l'anfora preparata pel marito, duca d'Aragona. At the 1872 Exhibition of Milan, he exhibited an allegorical figure depicting Sacred Music.

He painted frescoes for the interior of the church of the Incoronata in Lodi, and the Villa Oppenheim-Cora in Florence, Italy. He also painted the allegorical figure of Europa in one of the four lunettes of the octagon in the Galleria Vittorio Emanuele in Milan. He painted a Pico della Mirandola in the presence of Lorenzo de' Medici for the Royal Palace at Milan.

He was buried in the Monumental Cemetery of Milan, where Odoardo Tabacchi completed his bust.
