= Giovanni Antonio Greccolini =

Italian painter

- Born: January 16, 1675
- Died: 1756 (aged 80–81)
- Style: Rococo

Giovanni Antonio Greccolini, also known as Cregolini (16 January 1675–1756) was an Italian painter of the Rococo period.

He was initially a pupil of Giovanni Battista Lenardi, but after the master's death, he worked at the studio of Benedetto Luti in Rome. The other Italian students of Luti were Giacomo Triga, Giovanni Domenico Piastrini, Placido Costanzi and Giovanni Paolo Panini; English architect William Kent and French painter Charles-André van Loo were also among his students.

Cregolini's work Il martirio di San Clemente, is now displayed at the Palazzo Barberini, where it was donated by Fabrizio and Fiametta Lemme. Another work by Cregolini, L'adorazione dei pastori, has been displayed at the Church of the Holy Trinity in Ponza since 1943. It may have originally been displayed at the Church of St. Venantius in Rome, though this claim is disputed.
