= Giovanni Antonio Stuardi =

Italian sculptor

Giovanni Antonio Stuardi (Poirino, Piedmont, 1862 -1938) was an Italian sculptor.

== Biography ==
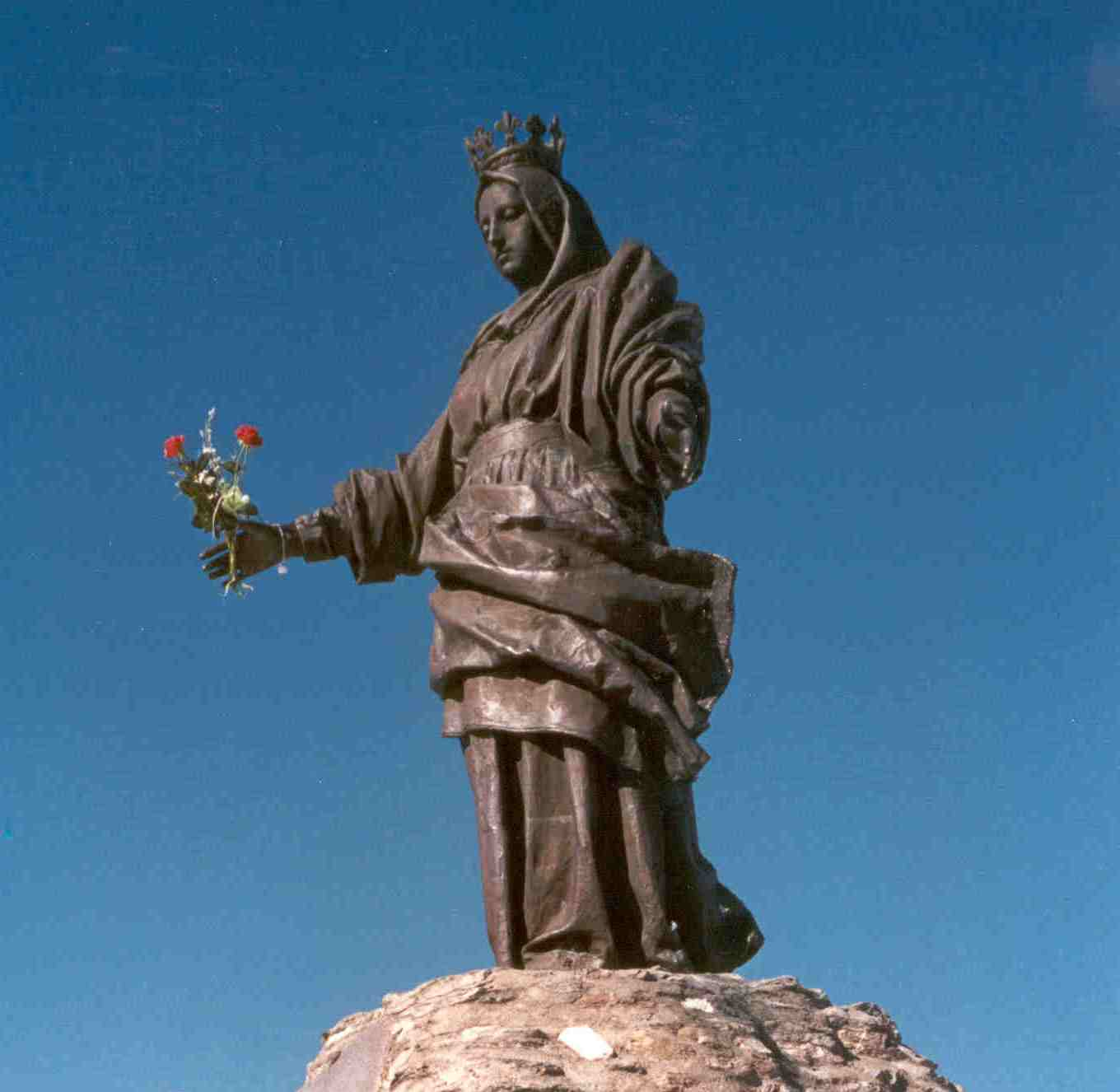
Madonna delle Vette on the Rocciamelone

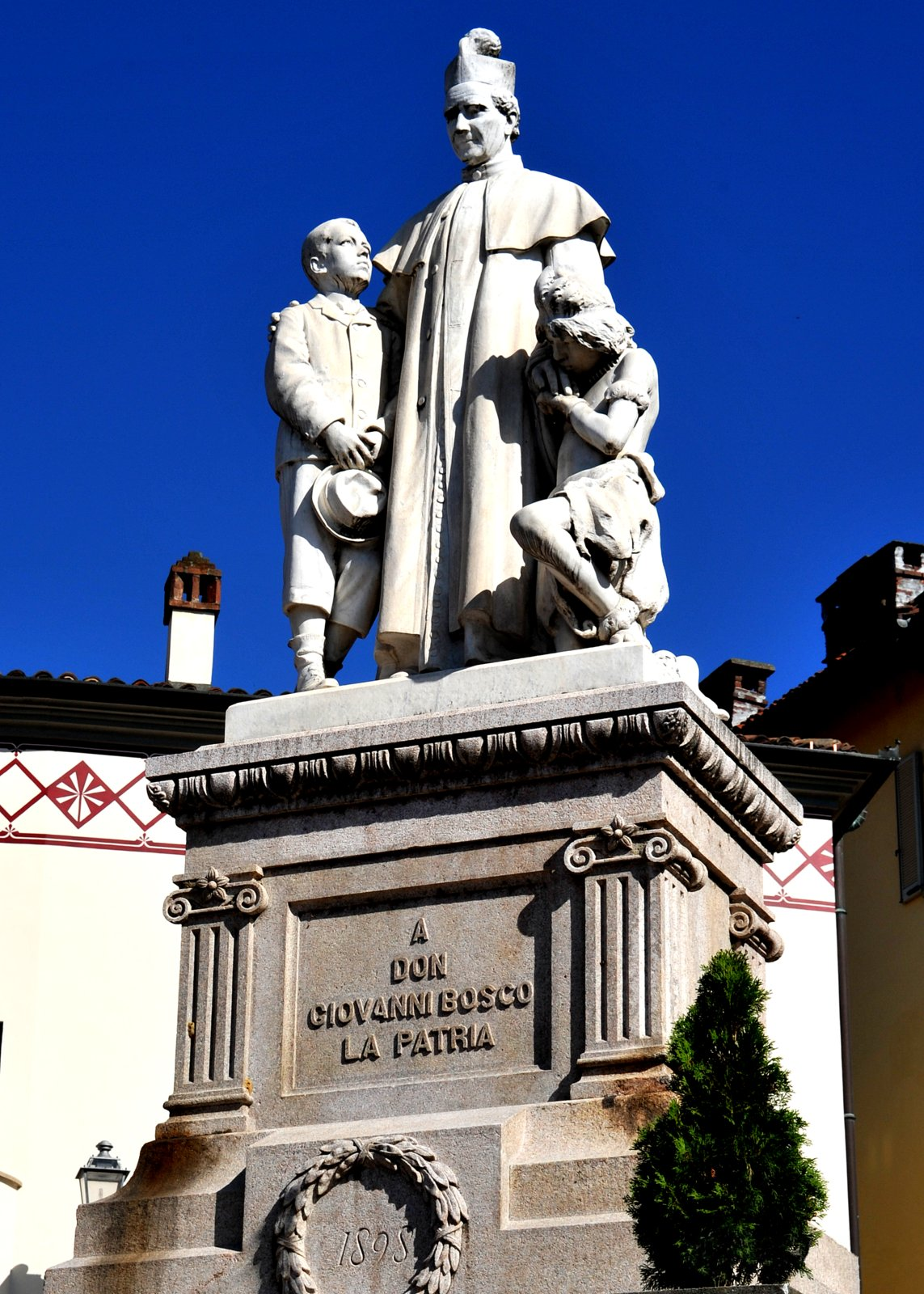
Monument to Don Bosco a Castelnuovo Don Bosco

Born in Piedmont, and active and resident in Turin. He was a pupil of Odoardo Tabacchi at the Accademia Albertina, and later of a sculptor named Belli.

He completed many of the funereal monuments in the cemeteries of Turin and other towns in Piedmont, including bas-reliefs and portraits, among them, the stucco bust of Lupercus, exhibited at Turin, in 1884; and the statue: Savoia, exhibited in Livorno, in 1886, and in Venice, in 1887, where he exhibited: Flower of the countryside.

In 1889, he displayed a statue of Charity at the Promotrice of Turin, which was acquired by the King. He also completed the Madonna delle Vette on the Rocciamelone's top, which was cast in bronze. He also complete the Monument to Don Bosco a Castelnuovo Don Bosco.
