= Chris-Craft Corporation =

American powerboat manufacturer

- Type: Subsidiary
- Industry: Boat building
- Headquarters: Sarasota, Florida, USA
- Products: Motorboats
- Parent: Winnebago Industries
- Website: www.chriscraft.com

2019 Chris-Craft Launch 35 GT

Chris-Craft Corporation is an American manufacturer of recreational powerboats that is based in Sarasota, Florida. Since June 4, 2018, the company has been owned by Winnebago Industries, an American manufacturer of recreational vehicles.

Chris-Craft Corporation is at least the fourth iteration of the boat building company. The original company, Chris-Craft Boats, was founded in the late 19th century by Christopher Columbus Smith (1861–1939) in Michigan. It became famous for its mahogany-hulled powerboats from the 1920s through the 1950s. It was succeeded by Chris-Craft Industries and then Murray Chris-Craft before becoming Chris-Craft Corporation.

== Original company ==
Chris Smith built his first wooden boat – a simple skiff, or punt – in 1874 when he was 13 years old. In 1881, he joined his brother Henry to begin manufacturing boats full-time. In 1910, the brothers joined with other partners to form the Smith Ryan Boat and Engine Company, focusing on building fast, economically-priced runabout boats for mass-market distribution. Their products made their debut at the New York and Chicago Boat Shows that year.

In 1922, Smith formed the Chris Smith & Sons Boat Company in Algonac, Michigan. The company name was changed to Chris-Craft in 1924. Chris-Craft sold high-end powerboats to wealthy patrons, such as Henry Ford and William Randolph Hearst.

In 1927, Chris Smith's son, Jay Smith, took over the company as President and General Manager – positions he would hold for the next 31 years. Chris Smith died in 1939, at the age of 78.

With the United States entering the Second World War in 1941, Chris-Craft shifted its focus to producing military goods, including patrol boats, rescue vessels, and utility launches for the United States Army and Navy. By the end of hostilities in 1945, the company had constructed in excess of 12,000 small boats for the United States military.

Following the war, Chris-Craft introduced a new lineup of civilian pleasure boats in time for the great American consumer market expansion of the 1950s. The company sold high-end boats to famous customers, such as Dean Martin, Katharine Hepburn, Frank Sinatra, and Elvis Presley. The boats were typically made from mahogany, and they were considered to be among the best available. They were easy to operate and maintain, which was a significant requirement for their "weekend sailor" owners.

That decade marked the height of company prestige, and the brand name Chris-Craft became virtually synonymous with pleasure boating. At one time, the company offered 159 different models, and it was the sales leader in many categories of small civilian powerboats.

Chris-Craft constructed its first fiberglass boat in 1955, and by 1957, the company purchased the Roamer Boat Company and began manufacturing metal boats under its newly formed Roamer Steel Boats Division (RSBD).

== Chris-Craft Industries, Inc. ==
Chris-Craft was acquired by Shields & Company's National Automotive Fibers, Inc. (NAFI) in 1960. In 1962, the new owners renamed the company Chris-Craft Industries, Incorporated. In 1962, the company acquired the Old Crown Brewing Corporation, a brewery company based in Fort Wayne, Indiana. Old Crown was sold to its employees a short time later.

In 1964, Chris-Craft launched the all-fiberglass Chris-Craft Commander. This dramatic new design was unveiled at the New York City National Boat show, perched at the top of an escalator on a giant, castered cradle. This first Commander was a 38' express hardtop with a 13' beam. The line of Commanders soon grew to include sizes ranging from 19' to 60' — all "styled in fiberglass."

Between the 1960s and 1980s, Chris-Craft increasingly moved toward fiberglass as a construction material of choice, primarily because of its durability and low maintenance requirements. Chris-Craft ended production of its last mahogany-hulled boat, the Constellation, in 1971.

== Murray Chris-Craft ==
In the face of declining sales due to the recession of the late 1970s and early 1980s, Chris-Craft Industries sold its boat division to George Dale Murray and a small group of investors that included Dick Genth, F. Lee Bailey, and Walt Schumacher in 1981. Chris-Craft Industries retained the Chris-Craft trademark and licensed it to Murray. Chris-Craft Industries was subsequently acquired by News Corporation in 2000 for its television subsidiary BHC Communications.

In fulfilling a commitment to return to powerboat racing, in 1984 Murray Chris-Craft developed the new 300 Chris-Cat, a racing catamaran powered by twin 400 or 420 horsepower high performance power plants and was added to its 1984 sport boat fleet. The boat went on to set new speed records in its class that year and in years to come. Murray believed that a racing program would benefit the company to develop safe, performance watercraft for its customers.

In addition to developing the Chris-Cat models for racing, Murray Chris-Craft also raced its deep-v, offshore Stinger models. Most notably, a 1984 Chris-Craft 312 won the Golden Gate to Spruce Goose race sponsored by Powerboat Magazine in 1984.

In 1984, Chris-Craft worked out a deal with Michael Mann Productions to have its 39-foot Stinger 390X featured on their new television show, Miami Vice. Five Stinger 390Xs were supplied to the show for filming of the premiere and first-season episodes. The show became a hit, and the placement of the Stingers on the show produced increased sales at Chris-Craft.

Chris-Craft's annual sales for 1984 were $120M. While the turnaround at Murray Chris-Craft seemed to be going smoothly, the relationship between partners George Dale Murray and Dick Genth was souring. Murray wanted to move Genth out of running the day-to-day operations of the company, and in August 1984, he offered the position of vice-chairman to Genth. Genth declined the offer, and resigned from Chris-Craft. Ernest J. Schmidt took over as president of Chris-Craft.

Chris-Craft's annual sales plateaued in 1986 at around $180M. As the company grew, George Dale Murray became involved in various real-estate ventures, which included a sizeable investment in the American Community Development Group (ACDG). The ACDG investment did not go well for Murray, and as early as 1986, he began looking to sell his shares in Chris-Craft. Murray found a buyer for his shares - Dr. Ghaith Pharaon. Pharaon began buying shares in 1986, and by 1988, he owned approximately 80% of Murray Chris-Craft.

In 1988, Pharaon hired independent auditors to go through the financials of the company. The resulting audit detailed serious accounting irregularities. The auditors estimated that the company had $77M in assets and $40M in debt. Pharaon, now majority owner of Murray Chris-Craft, pushed George Dale Murray out of the company and brought a suit against him seeking $34M in damages and $106M in punitive damages.

In the meantime, Chris-Craft continued to lose money. It was estimated that Chris-Craft was losing $2M/month in the second half of 1988. The situation for the company had become untenable, and on December 9, 1988, Chris-Craft filed for bankruptcy.

== Subsequent ownership changes ==
In February 1989, the assets of Murray Chris-Craft were put up for auction by the court handling Chris-Craft's bankruptcy. A bidding war broke out between Genmar Holdings and the Outboard Marine Corporation (OMC). The opening bid was set at $38.5M plus $5M for royalties and future sales of boats. OMC won the auction with a high bid of $58M. For its $58M, OMC acquired the tangible and intangible assets of Chris-Craft including the manufacturing facilities in Bradenton, Florida; Goshen, Indiana; and Swansboro, North Carolina. OMC also acquired the right to use the Chris-Craft name from Chris-Craft Industries in exchange for a yearly licensing fee of $500,000 plus 1% of Chris-Craft sales.

OMC went into bankruptcy in 2000 and was purchased by Genmar Holdings. Genmar sold the Chris-Craft division in 2001 to Stellican Limited, a British private equity firm. Stellican then purchased the Chris-Craft trademark from News Corporation, thus reuniting the two parts of the company.

On June 4, 2018, Chris-Craft was sold by Stellican to Winnebago Industries, the RV manufacturer.

== Chris-Craft boat production in 2024 ==
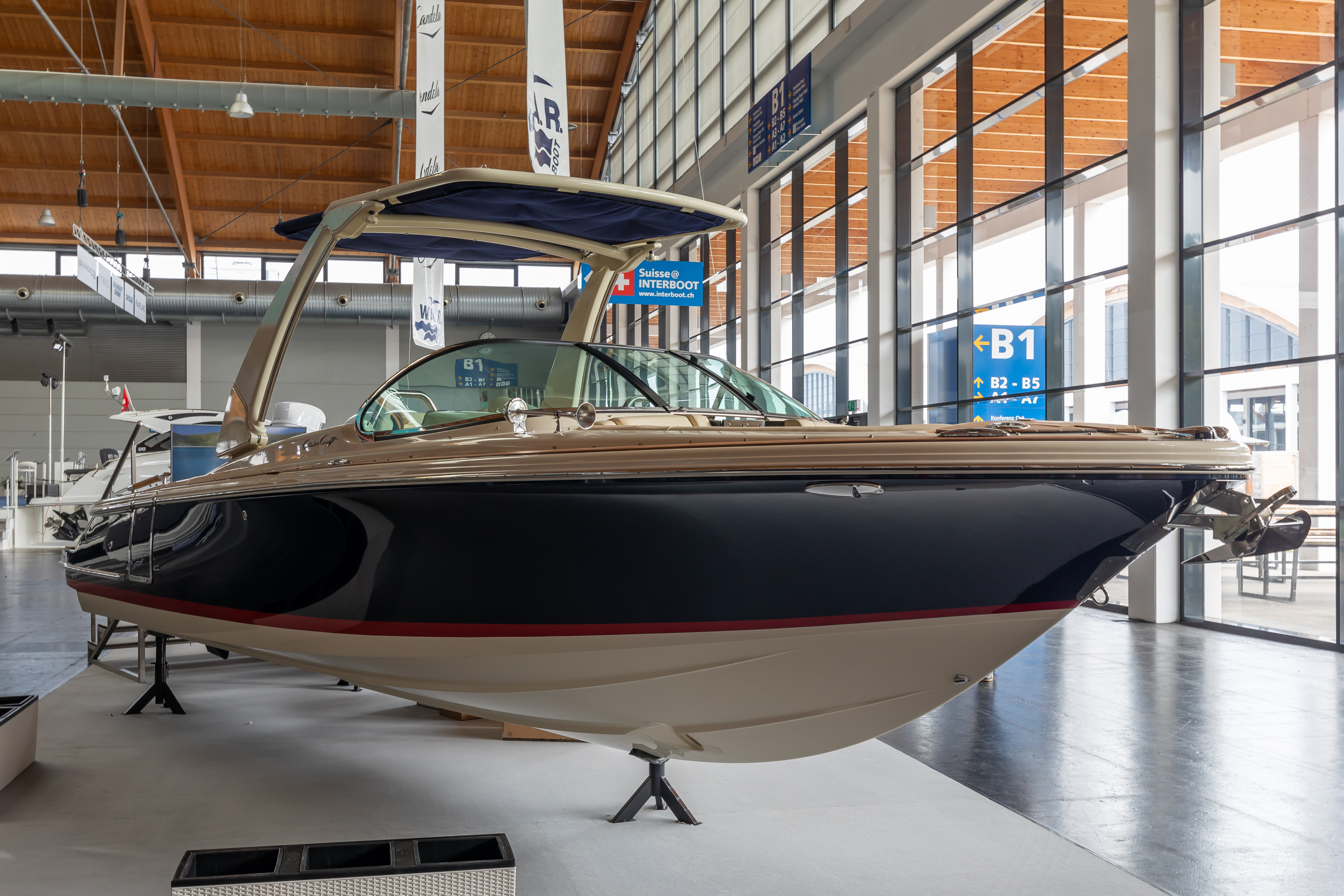
Launch 25 GT

The 2024 Chris-Craft model collection includes the Launch, Launch GT, Catalina and Calypso lines, which range in length from 24 to 35 feet:

- Launch – An open bow day cruiser at 27'
- Launch GT – Dynamic and versatile bowrider vessels ranging from 25' to 35'
- Catalina – Center console outboard boats ranging from 24’ to 34’ in length
- Calypso – Dual console outboard boats ranging from 24' to 35' lengths
