= Giovanni Antonio Molineri =

Italian painter (1577–1631)

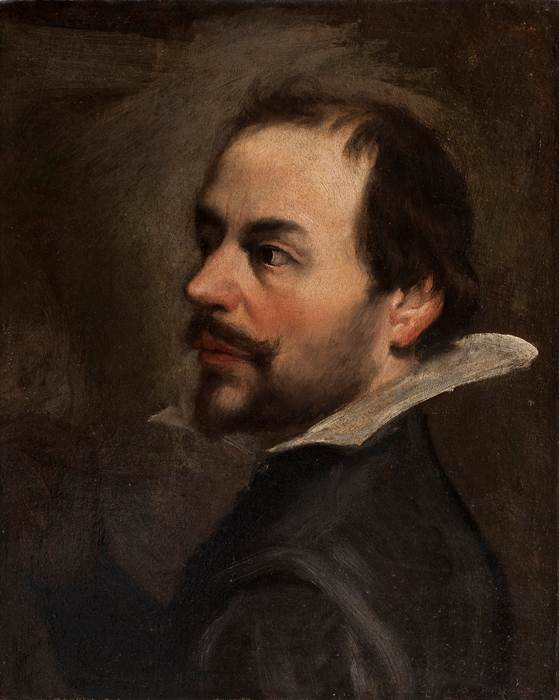
Self-portrait of Giovanni Antonio Molineri

Giovanni Antonio Molineri (1577–1631) was an Italian painter of the late Mannerist and early Baroque period.

He was born in Savigliano and died prematurely there, due to the plague. Molineri came to Rome at the start of the 17th century, and is documented there till 1615. In Rome, he was in contact with Bartolomeo Manfredi; but no works from this period are known. His work appears influenced by Ludovico Cigoli and Domenico Passignano.

A self-portrait (circa 1620) is present in Savigliano. He also painted frescoes (circa 1620–1621) in the chancel of San Pietro in Savigliano. He worked for the Dukes of Savoy and also for Amedeo Dal Pozzo, Marquess of Voghera.
