= 2026 Saudi Women's Super Cup =

كأس السوبر السعودي للسيدات

Tournament details
- Host country: Saudi Arabia
- City: Taif
- Dates: 1–5 September
- Teams: 4

Final positions
- Champions: Al Nassr (2nd title)
- Runners-up: Al Hilal

Tournament statistics
- Matches played: 3
- Goals scored: 15 (5 per match)
- Top scorer(s): Nesrine Bahlouli (NSR) (5 goals)
- Best player: Nesrine Bahlouli (NSR)
- Best goalkeeper: Mona Abdulrahman (NSR)

The 2026 Saudi Women's Super Cup is the second edition of the Saudi Women's Super Cup. The annual women's football competition contested by clubs from the Saudi Arabian football league system that achieved success in the major competitions of the preceding season. It was the first women's football competition in Saudi Arabia to use the video assistant referee (VAR) system.

Al Nassr are the defending champions.

== Qualification ==
Under the competition format, the champions and runners-up of the 2025–26 Saudi Women's Premier League and the 2025–26 Saudi Women's Cup qualify for the tournament. As Al Nassr had already qualified as league champions when they won the cup, the additional qualification place was awarded to the highest-placed Premier League team not already qualified. This resulted in third-placed Al Ittihad qualifying for the tournament.

=== Qualified teams ===
The following four teams qualified for the tournament.

Team	Qualification	
Team	Method	Date
Al Nassr	2024–25 Saudi Premier League Champions	26 March 2026
Al Ahli	2025–26 Saudi Premier League Runners-up	3 April 2026
Al Hilal	2025–26 Saudi Cup Runners-up	7 May 2026
Al Ittihad	2025–26 Saudi Premier League highest-placed non-qualified team	7 May 2026

== Bracket ==
Semi-finals
1 September
Al Nassr	5
Al Ahli	2
2 September
Al Hilal	2
Al Ittihad	1

Final
5 September 2025
Al Nassr
Al Hilal

== Matches ==
All Matches took place in Taif. All times listed are local (SAST, UTC+3).

=== Al Nassr vs Al Ahli ===
1 September 2025
17:45

Al Nassr	5–2	Al Ahli
Bahlouli 20', 28', 80', 90+1'; Faria 37'		Bravo 42' (pen.); Al-Hawsawi 70'

King Fahd Sports City Stadium, Taif
Referee: Bader Al-Subaie

Al Nassr	Al Ahli

GK	21	(Saudi Arabia) Mona Abdulrahman
DF	5	(Saudi Arabia) Layan Al Fathi
DF	4	(Saudi Arabia) Latifah Nawfawi
DF	22	(Saudi Arabia) Shuruq Al-Hwsawi
DF	27	(Saudi Arabia) Khloud Al Harthi
DM	19	(Tanzania) Julitha Singano
MF	8	(Saudi Arabia) Sara Al-Hamad
MF	69	(France) Nesrine Bahlouli	(yellow card) 36'
MF	80	(Portugal) Andreia Faria (C)
FW	7	(Saudi Arabia) Basmah Al-Shnaifi
FW	10	(Saudi Arabia) Mubarkh Al-Saiari
Substitutes:
GK	1	(Saudi Arabia) Reem Al-Beloshi
GK	97	(Saudi Arabia) Samar Ali
DF	13	(Saudi Arabia) Jana Al Habib
DF	3	(Saudi Arabia) Al-Jawharah Saud
MF	18	(Saudi Arabia) Shaikha Asiri
FW	2	(Saudi Arabia) Muneerah Al-Shurayan
FW	15	(Saudi Arabia) Rinas Al Yami
Manager:
(Saudi Arabia) Abdulaziz Al-Alwni

GK	1	(England) Claudia Moan
DF	29	(Democratic Republic of the Congo) Éva Sumo
DF	20	(Saudi Arabia) Nadiyah Al-Dhidan
DF	14	(Dominican Republic) Lucía León
DF	44	(Saudi Arabia) Wejdan Al Balkhi
MF	22	(Saudi Arabia) Sawaher Asseri
MF	8	(Argentina) Ruth Bravo (C)
MF	19	(Saudi Arabia) Maha Al Sharif
FW	18	(Cape Verde) Adriana Semedo
FW	70	(Saudi Arabia) Danah Fahad	(yellow card) 31'
FW	10	(Saudi Arabia) Moluk Al-Hawsawi
Substitutes:
GK	34	(Saudi Arabia) Ghaliah Emam
DF	3	(Saudi Arabia) Ghada Malhan
DF	21	(Saudi Arabia) Raghad Ghandourah
MF	11	(Saudi Arabia) Raghad Helmi
MF	5	(Saudi Arabia) Jawaher Al-Thagafi
MF	96	(Saudi Arabia) Manal Al-Saud
FW	7	(Saudi Arabia) Raneem Al-Sharif
FW	15	(Nigeria) Chinaza Uchendu
Manager:
(Iceland) Þorlákur Arnason

=== Al Hilal vs Al Ittihad ===
2 September 2025
17:45

Al Hilal	2–1	Al Ittihad
Abdullah 61'; Oshoala 72'		Plumptre 45+1'

King Fahd Sports City Stadium, Taif
Referee: Omar Abu-Zaid

Al Hilal	Al Ittihad

GK	18	(Brazil) Aline Reis
DF	13	(Saudi Arabia) Tahani Al-Zahrani	(substituted off) 89'
DF	14	(Brazil) Kathellen Feitoza (C)
DF	4	(Saudi Arabia) Nouf Saud
DF	3	(Saudi Arabia) Leen Al-Blehid
MF	47	(Saudi Arabia) Moudi Al Angari	(substituted off) 64'
MF	16	(Nigeria) Christy Ucheibe
MF	19	(Saudi Arabia) Fatimah Al-Omaysi	(substituted off) 46'
FW	80	(Nigeria) Asisat Oshoala
FW	9	(Morocco) Ibtissam Jraïdi	(substituted off) 64'
FW	66	(Saudi Arabia) Al-Bandari Abdullah	(substituted off) 79'
Substitutes:
GK	1	(Saudi Arabia) Nawal Al-Gelaish
DF	8	(Saudi Arabia) Al-Adda Al-Issa
DF	2	(Saudi Arabia) Mohrah Al-Subaie	(substituted on) 89'
DF	57	(Saudi Arabia) Ghadeer Al-Balawi	(substituted on) 79'
MF	10	(Ghana) Alice Kusi	(substituted on) 64'
MF	22	(Saudi Arabia) Abeer Al-Shamiri
MF	21	(Saudi Arabia) Joori Al Johani
FW	11	(Saudi Arabia) Manar Al-Anazi	(substituted on) 64'
FW	29	(Saudi Arabia) Danah Al-Dhuhiyan	(substituted on) 46'
Manager:
(Portugal) Luís Andrade

GK	1	(Slovenia) Zala Meršnik
DF	4	(Saudi Arabia) Layan Al-Yafei
DF	22	(Nigeria) Ashleigh Plumptre
DF	8	(Spain) María Díaz
DF	18	(Saudi Arabia) Layan Jouhari	(yellow card) 48'
DF	11	(Saudi Arabia) Hala Khashoggi
MF	5	(Saudi Arabia) Lana Abdulrazak
AM	10	(Saudi Arabia) Seba Tawfiq
MF	93	(Algeria) Lina Boussaha	(yellow card) 25'
FW	9	(Paraguay) Lice Chamorro
FW	7	(Saudi Arabia) Lamar Balkhudher
Substitutes:
GK	90	(Lebanon) Dana Abdulrahman
DF	47	(Saudi Arabia) Retaj Al-Thobaiti
DF	14	(Saudi Arabia) Farida Hanafi
DF	77	(Saudi Arabia) Diyala Soruji
MF	13	(Saudi Arabia) Maria Baghaffar
FW	99	(Saudi Arabia) Hiba Ouhachi
FW	20	(Saudi Arabia) Daliah Abu Laban
Manager:
(Spain) Raúl Pérez

=== Final ===
5 September 2025
17:45

Al Nassr	4–1	Al Hilal
Luvanga 12', 77', 82'; Bahlouli 46'		Oshoala 40'

King Fahd Sports City Stadium, Taif
Referee: Ali Al-Qahtani

Al Nassr	Al Hilal

GK	21	(Saudi Arabia) Mona Abdulrahman
DF	22	(Saudi Arabia) Shuruq Al-Hwsawi
DF	27	(Saudi Arabia) Khloud Al Harthi
DF	19	(Tanzania) Julitha Singano
MF	8	(Saudi Arabia) Sara Al-Hamad
MF	69	(France) Nesrine Bahlouli	(yellow card) 90+3'
MF	80	(Portugal) Andreia Faria
MF	20	(Burkina Faso) Judicaël Ouoba
FW	7	(Saudi Arabia) Basmah Al-Shnaifi
FW	10	(Saudi Arabia) Mubarkh Al-Saiari	(yellow card) 59'
FW	9	(Tanzania) Clara Luvanga	(yellow card) 73'
Substitutes:
GK	1	(Saudi Arabia) Reem Al-Beloshi
GK	97	(Saudi Arabia) Samar Ali
DF	5	(Saudi Arabia) Layan Al Fathi
DF	4	(Saudi Arabia) Latifah Nawfawi
DF	13	(Saudi Arabia) Jana Al Habib
MF	3	(Saudi Arabia) Al-Jawharah Saud
MF	18	(Saudi Arabia) Shaikha Asiri
FW	2	(Saudi Arabia) Muneerah Al-Shurayan
Manager:
(Saudi Arabia) Abdulaziz Al-Alwni

GK	1	(Saudi Arabia) Nawal Al-Gelaish
DF	13	(Saudi Arabia) Tahani Al-Zahrani	(yellow card) 54'
DF	14	(Brazil) Kathellen Feitoza (C)		(substituted off) 66'
DF	4	(Saudi Arabia) Nouf Saud		(substituted off) 16'
DF	3	(Saudi Arabia) Leen Al-Blehid
MF	16	(Nigeria) Christy Ucheibe
MF	10	(Ghana) Alice Kusi
MF	19	(Saudi Arabia) Fatimah Al-Omaysi		(substituted off) 66'
FW	80	(Nigeria) Asisat Oshoala
FW	9	(Morocco) Ibtissam Jraïdi
FW	66	(Saudi Arabia) Al-Bandari Abdullah	(yellow card) 5'	(substituted off) 81'
Substitutes:
GK	18	(Brazil) Aline Reis
GK	99	(Saudi Arabia) Dana Al Binali
DF	8	(Saudi Arabia) Al-Adda Al-Issa
DF	2	(Saudi Arabia) Mohrah Al-Subaie
DF	57	(Saudi Arabia) Ghadeer Al-Balawi		(substituted on) 81'
MF	47	(Saudi Arabia) Moudi Al Angari		(substituted on) 81'
MF	22	(Saudi Arabia) Abeer Al-Shamiri
FW	11	(Saudi Arabia) Manar Al-Anazi		(substituted on) 16'
FW	29	(Saudi Arabia) Danah Al-Dhuhiyan		(substituted on) 66'
Manager:
(Portugal) Luís Andrade

== Controversy ==
Approximately six hours before the kickoff of the first semi-final, Al-Nassr's forward Clara Luvanga was suspended, preventing her from taking part in the match, with no reason given for the suspension. The decision, particularly its timing, drew criticism from members of the Al Nassr squad and coaching staff.

Later, Asharq Al-Awsat (الشرق الأوسط) reported that the club's sporting administration had instructed the team not to field the player in the match. According to sources cited by the newspaper, the instruction caused significant distress in the dressing room, with the players reportedly considering withdrawing from the match.

== See also ==
- 2026–27 Saudi Women's Premier League
