= 2025–26 Saudi Women's Cup =

2025–26 SAFF Women's Cup
Tournament details
- Country: Saudi Arabia
- Dates: 9 October 2025 – 6 May 2026
- Teams: 12

Final positions
- Champions: Al-Nassr (1st title)
- Runners-up: Al-Hilal
- Third place: Al-Ula
- Fourth place: Al Qadsiah

Tournament statistics
- Matches played: 18
- Goals scored: 86 (4.78 per match)
- Top goal scorer: (Nigeria) Asisat Oshoala

Awards
- Best player: (Tanzania) Clara Luvanga
- Best goalkeeper: (Saudi Arabia) Mona Abdulrahman
- Goals scored in penalty shoot-outs not included.

The 2025–26 Saudi Women's Cup, officially the 2025–26 SAFF Women's Cup (Arabic: كأس الاتحاد السعودي للسيدات لموسم 2025/26) was the third season of the annual Saudi women's football cup competition. Twelve teams participated in the competition.

Al-Ahli were the two-time defending champions, having won all editions of the competition to date.

== Participating clubs ==
Initially, under the format regulations, 16 teams qualified for the competition, including all clubs from the Premier League, with the remaining places filled by First Division teams according to their league placement. After four of the 16 qualified teams had disbanded, the Football Federation reintroduced a new format featuring 12 teams.

Saudi Women's Premier League the 10 clubs of the 2024–25 season	Saudi Women's First Division League the best 6 clubs of the 2024–25 season
1. Al-Nassr; 2. Al-Ahli; 3. Al Qadsiah; 4. ~~Al-Shabab~~; 5. Al-Ula; 6. Al-Hilal; 7. Al-Ittihad; 8. Eastern Flames; 9. Al-Amal ▼; 10. Al-Taraji ▼	1. NEOM ▲; 2. ~~Abha~~ ▲; 3. ~~Al-Riyadh~~; 4. Al-Hmmah; 5. United Eagles; 6. ~~Jeddah~~

Notes

1. ^{†} Club disbanded its women's football section following the conclusion of the 2024–25 season.

=== Seeding ===
Clubs were seeded first according to their league tier (Premier League or First Division), and subsequently by their final standings in the 2024–25 season. The top four teams received a bye to the quarter-finals, while the remaining clubs competed in the qualification round.

Bye to the Quarter-finals
- Al-Nassr
- Al-Ahli (TH)
- Al-Qadsiah
- Al-Ula

Pot 1	Pot 2
Al-Hilal; Al-Ittihad; Eastern Flames; NEOM	Al-Amal; Al-Taraji; Al-Hmmah; United Eagles

=== Draw ===
The final draw was held on 1 September 2025 via videoconference from the headquarters of the Saudi Arabian Football Federation in Riyadh.

== Knockout stage ==
=== Bracket ===
Qualification to quarterfinals
Al-Taraji	1
Al-Hilal	7
Al-Ittihad	8
United Eagles	1
Al-Amal	0
NEOM	10
Al-Hmmah	1
Eastern Flames	2

Quarter-finals
Al-Ahli	2	1	3
Al-Hilal	1	5	6
Al-Qadsiah	4	1	5
Al-Ittihad	1	1	2
Al-Nassr	3	2	5
NEOM	0	0	0
Al-Ula	7	2	9
Eastern Flames	0	0	0

Semi-finals
Al-Hilal	2	5	7
Al-Qadsiah	1	1	2
Al-Nassr	2	4	6
Al-Ula	1	0	1

Final
Al-Hilal	2
Al-Nassr (a.e.t.)	3
Third place match
Al-Qadsiah	2
Al-Ula	3

=== Qualification to quarterfinals ===
10 October 2025	Al-Hmmah	1–2	Eastern Flames	Riyadh
18:10	Jaine 66'	Report	Feras 45+1'; Altuve 89'	Stadium: Al Yamamah University Staduym; Referee: Naif Al-Otaibi

10 October 2025	Al-Ittihad	8–1	United Eagles	Jeddah
18:40	Tawfiq 22'; Plumptre 39', 41'; Boussaha 44'; Díaz Cirauqui 45+2'; Balkhudher 67', 72'; Abdulrazak 75'	Report	Wanyonyi 36'	Stadium: Al-Ittihad Club Stadium; Referee: Ali Al-Qahtani

11 October 2025	Al-Taraji	1–7	Al Hilal	Qatif
17:55	Mfwamba 84'	Report	Jéssica 27'; Oshoala 39', 42'; Al-Bandary 45+4'; Chebbak 57', 59'; Al-Johani 66'	Stadium: Prince NBA Sports City Stadium; Referee: Sultan Al-Saadoon

11 October 2025	Al-Amal	0–10	NEOM	Riyadh
19:00		Report	Serrant 19', 31'; Omboudou 21'; Abbassi 39'; Al-Shareef 45+1'; Helmi 76'; Rashwan 77'; Kim 83'; Takroni 88' (o.g.); Al-Amri 90' (o.g.)	Stadium: Al Yamamah University Stadium; Referee: Faisal Al-Saadoon

=== Quarter-finals ===
==== First leg ====
16 January 2026	Al-Hilal	1–2	Al-Ahli	Riyadh
16:30	Al-Shammari 90+3'	Report	Kaba-Kaba 8'; Khalid 74'	Stadium: Inaya Medical Colleges Stadium; Referee: Fahad Al-Ghamdi

16 January 2026	Al-Ittihad	1–4	Al-Qadsiah	Jeddah
20:00	Boussaha 35'	Report	Adriana 5'; Ibrahim 11'; Marozsán 58'; Le Garrec 68'	Stadium: Al-Ittihad Club Stadium; Referee: Omar Abuzaid

17 January 2026	NEOM	0–3	Al-Nassr	Tabuk
16:00		Report	Bahlouli 6'; Al-Hawsawi 72' (o.g.); Luvanga 88' (pen.)	Stadium: King Khalid Sport City Stadium; Referee: Saad Al-Asmari

17 January 2026	Eastern Flames	0–7	Al-Ula	Khobar
20:00		Report	Bakker 2' (o.g.); Rose 5' (pen.), 85'; Zedadka 48'; Al-Khaldi 50'; Hasanbegović 57'; Bin Hmedeen 87'	Stadium: Prince Saud bin Jalawi Sports City Stadium; Referee: Nasser Al-Darh

==== Second leg ====
23 January 2026	Al-Nassr	2–0	NEOM	Riyadh
16:30	Luvanga 8', 34'	Report		Stadium: Al-Nassr Club Stadium; Referee: Abdullah Al-Qahtani

23 January 2026	Al-Ahli	1–5	Al-Hilal	Jeddah
20:00	Kaba-Kaba 9'	Report	Silva 18'; Chebbak 61'; Al-Omaysi 68'; Oshoala 73'; Hamraoui 90+1'	Stadium: Al-Ahli Club Stadium; Referee: Riyan Al-Aryani

24 January 2026	Al-Ula	2–0	Eastern Flames	Medina
16:00	Kapetanović 33'; Rose Bella 39'	Report		Stadium: Prince Mohammed Bin Abdulaziz Stadium; Referee: Mutaab Al-Rbyqi

24 January 2026	Al-Qadsiah	1–1	Al-Ittihad	Khobar
20:00	Adriana 5'	Report	Boussaha 76'	Stadium: Prince Saud bin Jalawi Sports City Stadium; Referee: Abdullah Al-Dahmshy

=== Semi-finals ===
==== First leg ====
30 April 2026	Al-Nassr	2–1	Al-Ula	Riyadh
19:00	Al-Saiari 40'; Bahlouli 70'	Report	Al-Qahtani 16'	Stadium: Al-Nassr Club Stadium; Referee: Nasser Khanfour

30 April 2026	Al-Hilal	2–1	Al-Qadsiah	Riyadh
21:00	Oshala 67' (pen.); Silva 78'	Report	Saud 13' (o.g.)	Stadium: Inaya Medical Colleges Stadium; Referee: Omar Al-Jarallah

==== Second leg ====
7 May 2026	Al-Qadsiah	1–5	Al-Hilal	Khobar
18:55	Nchout 42'	Report	Oshoala 36', 44', 73'; Silva 89'; Chebbak 90' (pen.)	Stadium: Prince Saud bin Jalawi Sports City Stadium; Referee: Badr Al-Subaie

7 May 2026	Al-Ula	0–4	Al-Nassr	Medina
21:00		Report	Kathellen 4'; Luvanga 9'; Faria 42'; Duda 69'	Stadium: Prince Mohammed bin Abdul Aziz Stadium; Referee: Muhannad Al-Juhani

=== Third place match ===
15 May 2026	Al-Qadsiah	2–3	Al-Ula	Riyadh
19:10	Nchout 13', 43'	Report	Kapetanović 5'; Hasanbegović 30'; Majri 84'	Stadium: Prince Faisal bin Fahd Sports City Stadium; Referee: Fahad Al-Ghamdi

=== Final ===
20 May 2026
20:30

Al-Hilal	2–3 (a.e.t.)	Al-Nassr
Silva 44'; Oshoala 120+1' (pen.)	Report	Luvanga 86', 96', 105+2'

Kingdom Arena, Riyadh
Referee: Walid Al-Mardasi

Al-Hilal	Al-Nassr

GK	13	(Spain) Noelia Gil
DF	17	(Cameroon) Claudia Dabda (C)
DF	4	(Saudi Arabia) Nouf Saud	(yellow card) 45+4'
DF	3	(Saudi Arabia) Leen Mohammed
DF	14	(Saudi Arabia) Al-Adda Fahad
MF	47	(Saudi Arabia) Moudi Abdulmehsen		(substituted off) 66'
MF	10	(France) Kheira Hamraoui
MF	19	(Saudi Arabia) Fatimah Mansour		(substituted off) 90'
FW	20	(Portugal) Jéssica Silva	(yellow card) 22'	(substituted off) 73'
FW	66	(Saudi Arabia) Al-Bandari Mobarak	(yellow card) 77'	(substituted off) 104'
FW	80	(Nigeria) Asisat Oshoala	(yellow card) 81'
Substitutes:
FW	11	(Saudi Arabia) Manar Al-Anazi		(substituted on) 66'
FW	7	(Morocco) Ghizlane Chebbak	(yellow card) 91'	(substituted on) 73'
GK	1	(Saudi Arabia) Nawal Al-Gelaish
DF	2	(Saudi Arabia) Mohrah Al-Subaie		(substituted on) 90'
DF	5	(Saudi Arabia) Ghadeer Al-Balawi		(substituted on) 104'
MF	6	(Saudi Arabia) Lulu Al-Obaid
MF	21	(Saudi Arabia) Joori Al-Johani
FW	22	(Saudi Arabia) Abeer Al-Shamiri
Manager:
(Portugal) Luís Andrade

GK	21	(Saudi Arabia) Mona Abdulrahman
DF	6	(Saudi Arabia) Aseel Ahmed	(yellow card) 119'
DF	14	(Brazil) Kathellen
DF	22	(Saudi Arabia) Shuruq Al-Hwsawi
DF	5	(Saudi Arabia) Layan Al-Fathi		(substituted off) 69'
MF	80	(Portugal) Andreia Faria
MF	20	(Brazil) Duda Francelino (C)
MF	69	(France) Nesrine Bahlouli
MF	7	(Saudi Arabia) Basmah Al-Shnaifi
FW	10	(Saudi Arabia) Mubarkh Al-Saiari		(substituted off) 120+2'
FW	9	(Tanzania) Clara Luvanga
Substitutes:
GK	1	(Saudi Arabia) Reem Al-Beloshi
DF	24	(Saudi Arabia) Hetaf Al-Sultan
DF	4	(Saudi Arabia) Latifah Nawfawi		(substituted on) 120+2'
DF	13	(Saudi Arabia) Jana Al-Habib
DF	3	(Saudi Arabia) Al-Jawharah Saud
FW	18	(Saudi Arabia) Shaikha Al-Asiri
FW	44	(Saudi Arabia) Wejdan Al-Balkhi
MF	8	(Saudi Arabia) Sara Al-Hamad		(substituted on) 69'
Manager:
(Indonesia) Rudy Eka Priyambada

== Top goalscorers ==
The following are the top scorers of the SAFF Women's Cup. Goals scored in penalty shoot-outs are not included.

Rank	Player	Team	Goals
1	(Nigeria) Asisat Oshoala	Al-Hilal	7
2	(Tanzania) Clara Luvanga	Al-Nassr	4
2	(Morocco) Ghizlane Chebbak	Al-Hilal	4
2	(Portugal) Jéssica Silva	Al-Hilal	4
5	(Cameroon) Rose Bella	Al-Ula	3
5	(Cameroon) Ajara Nchout	Al-Qadsiah	3
5	(Algeria) Lina Boussaha	Al-Ittihad	3
8	(Nigeria) Ashleigh Plumptre	Al-Ittihad	2
8	(Trinidad and Tobago) Maria-Frances Serrant	Neom	2
8	(Brazil) Adriana da Silva	Al-Qadsiah	2
8	(Democratic Republic of the Congo) Naomie Kabakaba	Al-Ahli	2
8	(France) Nesrine Bahlouli	Al-Nassr	2
8	(Bosnia and Herzegovina) Selma Kapetanović	Al-Ula	2
8	(Bosnia and Herzegovina) Melisa Hasanbegović	Al-Ula	2
8	(Saudi Arabia) Lamar Balkhudher	Al-Ittihad	2
16	Thirty-two players		1

== Prize money ==
The Saudi Arabian Football Federation announced the tournament's prize money, unchanged from the last edition.

Place	Teams	Amount (in riyal)
Champions	1	1,000,000 SAR
Runners-up	1	500,000 SAR
Third place	1	200,000 SAR
Total	3	1,700,000 SAR
