= 2026–27 Saudi Women's Premier League =

Saudi Women's Premier League
- Season: 2026–27
- Dates: 10 September 2026 – 12 May 2027
- Matches: 16
- Goals: 77 (4.81 per match)
- Top goalscorer: Esther González (QAD) (7 goals)
- All statistics correct as of 3 October 2026.

The 2026–27 Saudi Women's Premier League is the upcoming fifth season of the Saudi Women's Premier League (SWPL), the top division of women's football in Saudi Arabia.

Al-Nassr are the defending champions, having won every league title since the competition's inception.

== Teams ==
After being reduced to eight teams in the previous season following the withdrawal of several clubs', the league returned to a 10-team format for this season. Seven clubs retained their places, while Al-Taraji, Al-Nahda, and Al-Amal were promoted from the 2025–26 First Division League after finishing as the top three teams. Al-Taraji and Al-Amal returned to the top flight after a one-season absence. The three promoted clubs replaced Eastern Flames, who were relegated for the first time since the league's inception. Two of the three promoted clubs withdrew before the season's fixtures were released due to financial difficulties, reducing the field to eight teams.

Locations of the 2026–27 season of the Saudi Women's Premier League

| Team | Stadium | 2025–26 season |
|---|---|---|
| Al-Ahli | Al-Ahli Club Stadium, Jeddah | 2nd |
| Al-Hilal | Inaya Medical Colleges Stadium, Riyadh | 5th |
| Al-Ittihad | Al-Ittihad Club Stadium, Jeddah | 3rd |
| Al-Nassr | Al-Nassr Club Stadium, Riyadh | 1st |
| Al-Qadsiah | Prince Saud bin Jalawi Sports City Stadium, Khobar | 4th |
| Al-Taraji | Al-Taraji Club Stadium, Qatif | D1, 1st (Promoted) |
| Al-Ula | Prince Mohammed Bin Abdulaziz, Medina | 6th |
| NEOM | Jeddah Club Stadium, Jeddah | 7th |

=== Personnel, kits and sponsorship ===
| Team | Head coach | Captain(s) | Kit manufacturer | Kit sponsor(s) |
|---|---|---|---|---|
| Al-Ahli | (Serbia) Dragan Vuković | (Argentina) Ruth Bravo | Adidas | Cenomi |
| Al-Hilal | (Portugal) Luís Andrade | (Brazil) Kathellen | Puma | NHC, NESCAFÉ, Riyad Bank, Reef |
| Al-Ittihad | (Spain) Raúl Pérez | (Nigeria) Ashleigh Plumptre | Nike | TCL |
| Al-Nassr | (Saudi Arabia) Abdulaziz Al-Alwni (Note: Although Al-Alwni serves as the de facto head coach, he does not hold the coaching licence required to coach in the Premier League. Therefore, Yogie Nugraha is listed as Al-Nassr's head coach for official purposes.) | (Portugal) Andreia Faria | Adidas | —N/a |
| Al-Qadsiah | (Jamaica) Giles Barnes | (France) Léa Le Garrec | Nike | Aloula Aviation, Genesis, BesteBit, iz, Dar wa Emaar |
| Al-Taraji | (Bahrain) Isa Al-Ainawy | (Tunisia) Wafe Messaoud | | —N/a |
| Al-Ula | (Portugal) Zé Nando | (Jordan) Ayah Al-Majali | Kappa | al-Ula, ALTANFEETHI, Sweater |
| NEOM | (France) Fabrice Abriel | (Cameroon) Brigitte Omboudou | Adidas | Oxagon |

=== Coaching changes ===
| Team | Outgoing coach | Manner of departure | Date of vacancy | Position in table | Incoming coach | Date of appointment | Ref. |
|---|---|---|---|---|---|---|---|
| Al-Ahli | (Jordan) Manar Fraij | End of contract | 29 June 2026 | Pre-season | (Iceland) Þorlákur Arnason | 21 August 2026 | |
| Al-Qadsiah | (Canada) Carmelina Moscato | Mutual consent | 12 July 2026 | Pre-season | (Jamaica) Giles Barnes | 20 July 2026 | |
| Al-Ula | (Malta) Ray Farrugia | End of contract | Unknown | Pre-season | (Portugal) José Fernando | 15 August 2026 | |
| Al-Ahli | (Iceland) Þorlákur Arnason | Sacked | 3 November 2026 | 7th | (Serbia) Dragan Vuković | 3 November 2026 | |

=== Foreign players ===
Each club may register up to six foreign players, one of whom must satisfy specific eligibility criteria. A maximum of five foreign players may be on the field at any given time.

Note: Players may also be considered domestic under the league's eligibility regulations despite holding the nationality of another country.

| Club | Foreign players | | | | | |
| Club | Player 1 | Player 2 | Player 3 | Player 4 | Player 5 | Player 6 |
|---|---|---|---|---|---|---|
| Al-Ahli | (Argentina) Ruth Bravo | (Cape Verde) Adriana Semedo | (Democratic Republic of the Congo) Éva Sumo | (Dominican Republic) Lucía León | (England) Claudia Moan | (Nigeria) Chinaza Uchendu |
| Al-Hilal | (Brazil) Aline Reis | (Brazil) Kathellen | (Ghana) Alice Kusi | (Morocco) Ibtissam Jraïdi | (Nigeria) Asisat Oshoala | (Nigeria) Christy Ucheibe |
| Al-Ittihad | (Algeria) Lina Boussaha | (Nigeria) Ashleigh Plumptre | (Paraguay) Lice Chamorro | (Slovenia) Zala Meršnik | (South Africa) Hildah Magaia | (Spain) María Díaz |
| Al-Nassr | (Algeria) Nesrine Bahlouli | (Burkina Faso) Judicaël Ouoba | (Democratic Republic of the Congo) Ruth Kipoyi | (Portugal) Andreia Faria | (Tanzania) Julitha Singano | |
| Al-Qadsiah | (Brazil) Adriana | (Brazil) Duda Francelino | (Brazil) Letícia Teles | (Colombia) Mary Álvarez | (France) Léa Le Garrec | (Spain) Esther González |
| Al-Taraji | (Brazil) Keikei | (Ghana) Ajegipina Zakaria | (Ghana) Gifty Osei | (Nigeria) Taiwo Lawal | (Tunisia) Wafe Messaoud | (Zambia) Hellen Chanda |
| Al-Ula | (Algeria) Roselène Khezami | (Cameroon) Michaela Abam | (France) Justine Lerond | (France) Amel Majri | (Jordan) Ayah Al-Majali | (Tanzania) Opah Clement |
| NEOM | (Bosnia and Herzegovina) Selma Kapetanović | (Cameroon) Brigitte Omboudou | (Croatia) Doris Bačić | (Iraq) Shokhan Salihi | (Trinidad and Tobago) Maria-Frances Serrant | |

== League table ==
| Pos | Team | Pld | W | D | L | GF | GA | GD | Pts | Qualification or relegation |
|---|---|---|---|---|---|---|---|---|---|---|
| 1 | Al-Nassr | 7 | 6 | 0 | 1 | 19 | 8 | +11 | 18 | 2027–28 AFC Women's Champions League |
| 2 | Al-Qadsiah | 7 | 5 | 1 | 1 | 31 | 4 | +27 | 16 | |
| 3 | Al-Ittihad | 7 | 5 | 1 | 1 | 22 | 8 | +14 | 16 | |
| 4 | Al-Hilal | 7 | 4 | 1 | 2 | 26 | 8 | +18 | 13 | |
| 5 | Al-Ula | 7 | 3 | 0 | 4 | 15 | 13 | +2 | 9 | |
| 6 | NEOM | 7 | 1 | 2 | 4 | 8 | 19 | −11 | 5 | |
| 7 | Al-Ahli | 7 | 1 | 1 | 5 | 6 | 33 | −27 | 4 | |
| 8 | Al-Taraji | 7 | 0 | 0 | 7 | 7 | 41 | −34 | 0 | Relegation to the 2027–28 First Division League |

Updated to match(es) played on 7 November 2026. Source: SAFF
Rules for classification: 1) Points; 2) Goal difference; 3) Number of goals scored.

== Results ==
| Home \ Away | NAS | AHL | ITH | QDS | HIL | ULA | NEO | TRJ |
|---|---|---|---|---|---|---|---|---|
| Al-Nassr | | 27 Mar | 12 Dec | 12 May | 2–1 | 3–1 | 3–0 | 3–2 |
| Al-Ahli | 0–5 | | 0–3 | 0–10 | 0–9 | 6 May | 18 Mar | 11 Dec |
| Al-Ittihad | 4–2 | 12 May | | 1–2 | 12 Dec | 4–0 | 3–3 | 25 Mar |
| Al-Qadsiah | 0–1 | 1 Apr | 19 Mar | | 6 May | 11 Dec | 2–0 | 14–0 |
| Al-Hilal | 2 Apr | 13 Feb | 1–3 | 2–2 | | 26 Mar | 12 May | 6–0 |
| Al-Ula | 19 Mar | 4–0 | 2 Apr | 0–1 | 1–3 | | 12 Dec | 12 May |
| NEOM | 10 Dec | 1–1 | 6 May | 26 Mar | 0–4 | 0–4 | | 4–2 |
| Al-Taraji | 6 May | 1–5 | 0–4 | 11 Feb | 20 Mar | 2–5 | 3 Apr | |

Updated to match(es) played on 7 November 2026. Source: SAFF
Legend: Blue = home team win; Yellow = draw; Red = away team win.

== Positions by round ==
The following table lists the positions of teams after each week of matches. In order to preserve the chronological evolution, any postponed matches are not included in the round at which they were originally scheduled but added to the full round they were played immediately afterward.

| Team ╲ Round | 1 | 2 | 3 | 4 | 5 | 6 | 7 | 8 | 9 | 10 | 11 | 12 | 13 | 14 |
|---|---|---|---|---|---|---|---|---|---|---|---|---|---|---|
| Al-Nassr | 2 | 5 | 3 | 3 | 3 | 2 | 1 | | | | | | | |
| Al-Qadsiah | 4 | 1 | 1 | 1 | 1 | 1 | 2 | | | | | | | |
| Al-Ittihad | 3 | 2 | 4 | 4 | 2 | 3 | 3 | | | | | | | |
| Al-Hilal | 6 | 3 | 2 | 2 | 4 | 4 | 4 | | | | | | | |
| Al-Ula | 5 | 4 | 6 | 6 | 7 | 5 | 5 | | | | | | | |
| NEOM | 7 | 7 | 7 | 7 | 5 | 6 | 6 | | | | | | | |
| Al-Ahli | 1 | 6 | 5 | 5 | 6 | 7 | 7 | | | | | | | |
| Al-Taraji | 8 | 8 | 8 | 8 | 8 | 8 | 8 | 8 | | | | | | |

| Leader and AFC Women's Champions League |
| Relegation to Saudi Women's First Division League |

Updated to match(es) played on 7 November 2026. Source: SAFF

== Season statistics ==
As of 7 November 2026

=== Top scorers ===
| Rank | Player | Club | Goals |
|---|---|---|---|
| 1 | (Brazil) Adriana Silva | Al-Qadsiah | 10 |
| 2 | (Spain) Esther González | Al-Qadsiah | 9 |
| 3 | (Algeria) Lina Boussaha | Al-Ittihad | 8 |
| 3 | (Paraguay) Lice Chamorro | Al-Ittihad | 8 |
| 5 | (Ghana) Ajegipina Zakaria | Al-Taraji | 6 |
| 5 | (Portugal) Andreia Faria | Al-Nassr | 6 |
| 7 | (Algeria) Nesrine Bahlouli | Al-Nassr | 4 |
| 7 | (France) Amel Majri | Al-Ula | 4 |
| 7 | (Iraq) Shokhan Salihi | NEOM | 4 |
| 7 | (Nigeria) Asisat Oshoala | Al-Hilal | 4 |
| 7 | (Saudi Arabia) Al-Bandari Abdullah | Al-Hilal | 4 |
| 7 | (Tanzania) Opah Clement | Al-Ula | 4 |

=== Clean sheets ===
| Rank | Player | Club | Clean sheets |
|---|---|---|---|
| 1 | (Saudi Arabia) Sara Khalid | Al-Qadsiah | 4 |
| 2 | (Saudi Arabia) Mona Abdulrahman | Al-Nassr | 3 |
| 3 | (France) Justine Lerond | Al-Ula | 2 |
| 3 | (Saudi Arabia) Nawal Al-Gelaish | Al-Hilal | 2 |
| 3 | (Slovenia) Zala Meršnik | Al-Ittihad | 2 |
| 6 | (Brazil) Aline Reis | Al-Hilal | 1 |
| 6 | (Lebanon) Dana Abdulrahman | Al-Ittihad | 1 |

== Individual awards ==
=== Monthly awards ===
| Month | Player of the Month | | | Goalkeeper of the Month | | |
| Month | Player | Club | % | Player | Club | % |
|---|---|---|---|---|---|---|
| September | (Portugal) Andreia Faria | Al-Nassr | 85.5% | (Slovenia) Zala Meršnik | Al-Ittihad | 66% |
| October | (Brazil) Adriana Silva | Al-Qadsiah | 51% | (Saudi Arabia) Sara Khalid | Al-Qadisah | 89% |

=== Weekly awards ===
==== Goal of the Week ====
| Week | Goal of the Week | | Ref. |
| Week | Player | Club | Ref. |
|---|---|---|---|
| 1 | (Nigeria) Chinaza Uchendu | Al-Ahli | |
| 2 | (France) Amel Majri | Al-Ula | |
| 3 | (Spain) María Díaz | Al-Ittihad | |
| 4 | (Saudi Arabia) Manar Al-Anazi | Al-Hilal | |
| 5 | (Brazil) Adriana da Silva | Al-Qadsiah | |
| 6 | (France) Amel Majri | Al-Ula | |
