= 2025 Saudi Women's Premier Challenge Cup – Winter edition =

Saudi Women's Premier Challenge Cup Winter edition
Tournament details
- Country: Saudi Arabia
- Dates: 10–20 December 2025
- Teams: 8

Final positions
- Champions: Al-Nassr (1st title)
- Runners-up: Al-Hilal
- Third place: Al-Ittihad
- Fourth place: Al-Ahli

Tournament statistics
- Matches played: 14
- Goals scored: 78 (5.57 per match)
- Top goal scorer(s): Clara Luvanga (NSR) (8 goals)

Awards
- Best player: Andreia Faria (NSR)
- Best goalkeeper: Mona Abdulrahman (NSR)

The 2025 Saudi Women's Premier Challenge Cup – Winter edition was the inaugural edition of the Saudi Women's Premier Challenge Cup, the annual Premier's league cup competition.

== Format ==
The competition adopts a regional group-and-knockout format for its inaugural edition. The competition features clubs from the Saudi Women's Premier League, divided into two groups representing the Eastern and Western regions:

Group A	Group B
Al-Nassr; Al-Hilal; Al-Qadsiah; Eastern Flames	Al-Ahli; Al-Ittihad; Al-Ula; NEOM

The group stage is played as a single round-robin, with each team playing two matches. The first and second-seeded teams in each group are paired against the third and fourth-seeded sides. Matches drawn after 90 minutes proceed directly to a penalty shoot-out. Teams earn 3 points for a win in normal time, 2 points for a shoot-out win, and 1 point for a shoot-out loss.

The top two teams in each group advance to the knockout stage, while the bottom two advance to the Regional Challenge. The semi-final winners qualify for the final, with the losing teams contesting the third-place match.

== Group stage ==
Tiebreakers

Teams are ranked according to points (3 points for a win in normal time, 2 points for a penalty shoot-out win, 1 point for a penalty shoot-out loss, 0 points for a loss in normal time). If two or more teams are equal on points, the following tiebreaking criteria are applied, in the order given:

1. Goal difference in all group matches;
2. Goals scored in all group matches;
3. Disciplinary points (yellow card = 1 point; red card as a result of two yellow cards = 3 points; direct red card = 3 points; yellow card followed by direct red card = 4 points). The team with the lower total ranks higher;
4. Drawing of lots.

=== Group A ===
Pos	Team	Pld	W	PW	PL	L	GF	GA	GD	Pts	Qualification
1	Al-Nassr	2	2	0	0	0	11	1	+10	6	Advanced to the Semi-finals
2	Al-Hilal	2	1	0	0	1	8	5	+3	3	Advanced to the Semi-finals
3	Al-Qadsiah	2	1	0	0	1	5	5	0	3	Advanced to the Regional Challenge
4	Eastern Flames	2	0	0	0	2	1	14	−13	0	Advanced to the Regional Challenge

Source: SAFF
10 December 2025
16:00

Al-Nassr	9–1	Eastern Flames
Duda 10'; Bahlouli 32', 69'; Al-Hwsawi 37'; Luvanga 45', 54', 78', 82'; Faria 76'	Report	Altuve 58'

Al-Taraji Club Stadium, Qatif
Referee: Mohammed Bojbara
10 December 2025
20:00

Al-Hilal	3–5	Al-Qadsiah
Silva 45'; Al-Blehid 62'; Al-Shammari 87'	Report	Marozsán 1'; Rayanne 28'; Al-Faris 40'; Ibrahim 49', 60'

Al-Taraji Club Stadium, Qatif
Referee: Mohanad Al-Juhani

13 December 2025
16:00

Al-Qadsiah	0–2	Al-Nassr
	Report	Luvanga 1'; Duda 85'

Al-Taraji Club Stadium, Qatif
Referee: Ali Al-Zahrani
13 December 2025
20:00

Eastern Flames	0–5	Al-Hilal
	Report	Oshoala 23', 81', 90+6'; Hamraoui 90'; Silva 90+7'

Al-Taraji Club Stadium, Qatif
Referee: Abdullah Sawadi

=== Group B ===
Pos	Team	Pld	W	PW	PL	L	GF	GA	GD	Pts	Qualification
1	Al-Ahli	2	2	0	0	0	11	2	+9	6	Advanced to the Semi-finals
2	Al-Ittihad	2	2	0	0	0	7	1	+6	6	Advanced to the Semi-finals
3	Al-Ula	2	0	0	0	2	2	4	−2	0	Advanced to the Regional Challenge
4	NEOM	2	0	0	0	2	1	14	−13	0	Advanced to the Regional Challenge

Source: SAFF
11 December 2025
16:15

Al-Ahli	8–0	NEOM
Meyong 20'; Jraïdi 34', 87', 88'; Kaba Kaba 37', 75'; Abu-Laban 68', 71'	Report

Prince Abdullah Al-Faisal Sports City, Jeddah
Referee: Sultan Akiri
11 December 2025
20:10

Al-Ittihad	1–0	Al-Ula
Balkhudher 82'	Report

Prince Abdullah Al-Faisal Sports City, Jeddah
Referee: Riyan Al-Aryani

14 December 2025
16:15

Al-Ula	2–3	Al-Ahli
Zedadka 28'; Al-Khaldi 49'	Report	Kaba Kaba 34', 39'; Al-Qadhibi 72' (o.g.)

Prince Abdullah Al-Faisal Sports City, Jeddah
Referee: Omar Abu Zaid
14 December 2025
20:10

NEOM	1–6	Al-Ittihad
Al-Anzi 72'	Report	Nunes 25'; Ordega 31'; Al-Harthi 51' (o.g.); Boussaha 55', 65', 89'

Prince Abdullah Al-Faisal Sports City, Jeddah
Referee: Mohammed Al-Ahmari

== Regional Challenge ==
16 December 2025
16:00

Al-Qadsiah	4–3	Eastern Flames
Rayanne 22', 86'; Nchout Njoya 50'; Marozsán 81' (pen.)	Report	Al-Subaie 15'; Padilla 32'; Al-Ali 41'

Al-Taraji Club Stadium, Qatif
Referee: Saad Al-Dosari

17 December 2025
18:15

Al-Ula	6–0	NEOM
Kapetanović 24'; Tuani 27', 38'; Al-Khaldi 41'; Al-Otaibi 45'; Bella Rose 81' (pen.)	Report

Prince Abdullah Al-Faisal Sports City, Jeddah
Referee: Abdullah Al-Qarni

== Knockout stage ==
=== Bracket ===
Semi-finals
17 December
Al-Nassr	5
Al-Ittihad	0
17 December
Al-Ahli	2
Al-Hilal	6

Final
20 December
Al-Nassr	2
Al-Hilal	0
Third place
20 December
Al-Ittihad (p)	2 (3)
Al-Ahli	2 (1)

=== Semi-finals ===
17 December 2025
16:15

Al-Nassr	5–0	Al-Ittihad
Faria 7'; Kipoyi 15'; Al-Hwsawi 40'; Luvanga 52', 80'	Report

Inaya Medical Colleges Stadium, Riyadh
Referee: Saber Mojamami

17 December 2025
20:15

Al-Ahli	2–6	Al-Hilal
Kaba Kaba 48'; Jraïdi 73'	Report	Oshoala 14', 65', 76'; Fahad 21'; Silva 50', 68'

Inaya Medical Colleges Stadium, Riyadh
Referee: Saad Al-Asmari

=== Third place play-off ===
20 December 2025
16:15

Al-Ittihad	2–2	Al-Ahli
Nunes 89'; Balkhudher 90+6'	Report	Abu-Laban 61'; Jraïdi 80'
Penalties
Abdulrazak (penalty scored); Plumptre (penalty scored); Ordega (penalty scored)	3–1	(penalty scored) Al-Majali; (penalty missed) Hanafi; (penalty missed) Jraïdi; (penalty missed) Meyong Menene

Inaya Medical Colleges Stadium, Riyadh
Referee: Khaled Al-Rashidi

=== Final ===
20 December 2025
20:15

Al-Nassr	2–0	Al-Hilal
Luvanga 28'; Kipoyi 36'	Report

Inaya Medical Colleges Stadium, Riyadh
Referee: Mohammed Al-Amri

== Goalscorers ==
There were 78 goals scored in 14 matches, for an average of 5.57 goals per match.

8 goals

- (Tanzania) Clara Luvanga (NSR)

6 goals

- (Nigeria) Asisat Oshoala (HIL)

5 goals

- (Democratic Republic of the Congo) Naomie Kaba Kaba (AHL)
- (Morocco) Ibtissam Jraïdi (AHL)

4 goals

- (Portugal) Jéssica Silva (HIL)

3 goals

- (Algeria) Lina Boussaha (ITI)
- (Brazil) Rayanne Machado (QAD)
- (Saudi Arabia) Dalia Abu-Laban (AHL)

2 goals

- (Brazil) Duda Francelino (NSR)
- (Brazil) Tuani Lemos (ULA)
- (Brazil) Letícia Nunes (ITI)
- (Democratic Republic of the Congo) Ruth Kipoyi (NSR)
- (France) Nesrine Bahlouli (NSR)
- (Germany) Dzsenifer Marozsán (QAD)
- (Portugal) Andreia Faria (NSR)
- (Saudi Arabia) Shuruq Al-Hwsawi (NSR)
- (Saudi Arabia) Nawras Al-Khaldi (ULA)
- (Saudi Arabia) Lamar Balkhudher (ITI)
- (Saudi Arabia) Noura Ibrahim (QAD)

1 goal

- (Bosnia and Herzegovina) Selma Kapetanović (ULA)
- (Cameroon) Rose Bella (ULA)
- (Cameroon) Charlène Meyong (AHL)
- (Cameroon) Ajara Nchout (QAD)
- (France) Kheira Hamraoui (HIL)
- (Nigeria) Francisca Ordega (ITI)
- (Saudi Arabia) Munirah Al-Ali (EFL)
- (Saudi Arabia) Areej Al-Anzi (NEO)
- (Saudi Arabia) Leen Al-Blehid (HIL)
- (Saudi Arabia) Yara Al-Faris (QAD)
- (Saudi Arabia) Majd Al-Otaibi (ULA)
- (Saudi Arabia) Abeer Al-Shammari (HIL)
- (Saudi Arabia) Atheer Al-Subaie (EFL)
- (Saudi Arabia) Al-Adda Fahad (HIL)
- (Saudi Arabia) Safa Zedadka (ULA)
- (Spain) Patricia Padilla (EFL)
- (Venezuela) Oriana Altuve (EFL)

1 own goal

- (Saudi Arabia) Kholoud Al-Harthi (NEO, against Al-Ittihad)
- (Saudi Arabia) Reema Al-Qadhibi (ULA; against Al-Ahli)

== See also ==
- 2025–26 Saudi Women's Cup
- 2025–26 Saudi Women's Premier League
