= 2025–26 Saudi Women's Premier League =

Saudi Women's Premier League
- Season: 2025–26
- Dates: 12 September 2025 – 3 April 2026
- Champions: Al-Nassr (4th title)
- Relegated: Eastern Flames
- AFC Women's Champions League: Al-Nassr
- Matches: 56
- Goals: 247 (4.41 per match)
- Best Player: (France) Léa Le Garrec
- Top goalscorer: (Tanzania) Clara Luvanga (24 goals)
- Best goalkeeper: (Saudi Arabia) Mona Abdulrahman
- Biggest home win: Al-Qadsiah 8–1 Eastern Flames (14 November 2025)
- Biggest away win: Eastern Flames 0–9 Al-Qadsiah (3 April 2026)
- Highest scoring: Al-Ula 2–9 Al-Qadsiah (12 February 2026)
- Longest winning run: 10 games Al-Nassr
- Longest unbeaten run: 10 games Al-Nassr
- Longest winless run: 11 games Eastern Flames
- Longest losing run: 11 games Eastern Flames

The 2025–26 Saudi Women's Premier League, was the fourth season of the Saudi Women's Premier League, the top-level women's football league in Saudi Arabia.

Al-Nassr were the three-time defending champions and successfully defended their title to win a fourth consecutive championship. Like the previous season, Al-Nassr only lost one match during the campaign.

== Overview ==
In September 2025, All Women Sport Network announced an agreement with the Saudi Arabian Football Federation and SSC to broadcast the season's matches globally.

Following the closure of SSC in October 2025, MBC Group signed an agreement with the Saudi Arabian Football Federation to broadcast the Saudi Women's Premier League matches across the Middle East and North Africa for the 2025–26 and 2026–27 seasons.

== Teams ==
Initially, ten teams were set to compete in the fourth season, with Abha and NEOM promoted to the Premier League to replace the relegated Al-Amal and Al-Taraji. However, by August 2025, Abha and Al-Shabab had disbanded their women's teams. On 15 August 2025, it was confirmed that eight teams would participate this season.

Locations of the 2025–26 Women's Premier League teams

Team	Location	Ground	Capacity	2024–25 Season
Al-Ahli	Jeddah	Al-Ahli Club Stadium	10,000	2nd
Al-Hilal	Riyadh	Inaya Medical Colleges Stadium	2,000	6th
Al-Ittihad	Jeddah	Al-Ittihad Club Stadium	15,000	7th
Al-Nassr	Riyadh	Al-Nassr Club Stadium	10,000	1st
Al-Qadsiah	Khobar	Prince Saud bin Jalawi Sports City	11,000	3rd
Al-Ula	Medina	Prince Mohammed Bin Abdulaziz Sports City	24,000	5th
Eastern Flames	Dammam	Prince Saud bin Jalawi Sports City; Al-Safa Club Stadium	11,000; 3,500	8th
NEOM	Tabuk	King Khalid Sport City Stadium	12,000	D1, 1st

=== Personnel and kits ===
Team	Manager	Captain	Kit manufacturer	Shirt sponsor
Al-Ahli	(Jordan) Manar Fraij	(Morocco) Ibtissam Jraïdi	Adidas	Red Sea Global
Al-Hilal	(Portugal) Luís Andrade	(Cameroon) Claudia Dabda	Puma	Jahez, Alwaleed Philanthropies, Nescafé
Al-Ittihad	(Spain) Raúl Pérez	(Nigeria) Ashleigh Plumptre	Nike	Saudi Arabia Railways
Al-Nassr	(Saudi Arabia) Abdulaziz Al-Alwni (Note: Although Al-Alwni serves as the de facto coach, official documents and match sheets list assistant Rudy Eka Priyambada as head coach. No official explanation has been provided, although it is believed that Al-Alwni does not possess the required licence to coach in the Premier League.)	(Brazil) Duda Francelino	Adidas	KAFD, AviLease, Sephora
Al-Qadsiah	(Canada) Carmelina Moscato	(Brazil) Rayanne Machado	Nike	Iz (Arabic: عز), Genesis
Al-Ula	(Malta) Ray Farrugia	(Brazil) Tuani Lemos	Kappa	Alula
Eastern Flames	(Spain) Alfonso Mesa	(Saudi Arabia) Munirah Al-Ali	Puma	
NEOM	(France) Fabrice Abriel	(Tunisia) Chaima Abbassi	Puma	

=== Managerial changes ===
Team	Outgoing manager	Manner of departure	Date of vacancy	Position in table	Incoming manager	Date of appointment
Al-Nassr	(Cape Verde) Sandro Mendes	End of contract	9 May 2025	Pre-season	(Indonesia) Rudy Eka Priyambada	6 July 2025
Al-Ittihad	(Brazil) Lindsay Camila	End of contract	2 June 2025	Pre-season	(Spain) Raúl Pérez Rodríguez	12 July 2025
Eastern Flames	(Bahrain) Isa Al-Ainawy	End of contract	2 June 2025	Pre-season	(Spain) Alfonso Mesa	15 July 2025
Al-Qadsiah	(Portugal) Luís Andrade	End of contract	4 June 2025	Pre-season	(Canada) Carmelina Moscato	21 July 2025
Al-Hilal	(Spain) José Ángel Herrera	Mutual consent	14 December 2025	2nd	(Spain) Adrián Fumero (caretaker)	20 December 2025
Al-Hilal	(Spain) Adrián Fumero	End of caretaker spell	29 January 2026	4th	(Portugal) Luís Andrade	4 February 2026

=== Foreign players ===
Club	Foreign players					
Club	Player 1	Player 2	Player 3	Player 4	Player 5	Player 6
Al-Ahli	(Cameroon) Charlène Meyong	(Democratic Republic of the Congo) Naomie Kabakaba	(Ghana) Alice Kusi	(Jordan) Ayah Al-Majali	(Morocco) Ibtissam Jraïdi	(United States) Lindsay Harris
Al-Hilal	(Cameroon) Claudia Dabda	(France) Kheira Hamraoui	(Morocco) Ghizlane Chebbak	(Nigeria) Asisat Oshoala	(Portugal) Jéssica Silva	(Spain) Noelia Gil
Al-Ittihad	(Algeria) Lina Boussaha	(Brazil) Letícia Nunes	(Nigeria) Ashleigh Plumptre	(Nigeria) Francisca Ordega	(Slovenia) Zala Meršnik	(Spain) María Díaz Cirauqui
Al-Nassr	(Brazil) Duda Francelino	(Brazil) Kathellen	(Democratic Republic of the Congo) Ruth Kipoyi	(France) Nesrine Bahlouli	(Portugal) Andreia Faria	(Tanzania) Clara Luvanga
Al-Qadsiah	(Brazil) Adriana	(Brazil) Rayanne Machado	(Cameroon) Ajara Nchout	(France) Léa Le Garrec	(Germany) Dzsenifer Marozsán	(Iceland) Sara Björk Gunnarsdóttir
Al-Ula	(Bosnia and Herzegovina) Melisa Hasanbegović	(Bosnia and Herzegovina) Selma Kapetanović	(Brazil) Aline	(Brazil) Tuani Lemos	(Cameroon) Rose Bella	(France) Amel Majri
Eastern Flames	(Brazil) Keikei	(Jordan) Lana Feras	(Spain) Patricia Padilla	(Venezuela) Oriana Altuve	(Zambia) Hellen Chanda	
NEOM	(Cameroon) Brigitte Omboudou	(France) Manon Heil	(Ghana) Abi Kim	(Trinidad and Tobago) Maria-Frances Serrant	(Tunisia) Chaima Abbassi	

== League table ==
Pos	Team	Pld	W	D	L	GF	GA	GD	Pts	Qualification or relegation
1	Al-Nassr (C)	14	13	0	1	55	12	+43	39	2026–27 AFC Women's Champions League
2	Al-Ahli	14	8	3	3	46	27	+19	27	
3	Al-Ittihad	14	8	2	4	24	21	+3	26	
4	Al-Qadsiah	14	7	2	5	55	25	+30	23	
5	Al-Hilal	14	7	2	5	31	27	+4	23	
6	Al-Ula	14	4	2	8	16	41	−25	14	
7	NEOM	14	1	3	10	9	35	−26	6	
8	Eastern Flames (R)	14	1	0	13	11	59	−48	3	Relegation to the 2026–27 First Division League

Source: SAFF
Rules for classification: 1) Points; 2) Goal difference; 3) Number of goals scored.
(C) Champions; (R) Relegated

== Results ==
The season's match schedule was announced on 15 August 2025.

Home \ Away	NAS	AHL	QDS	ULA	HIL	ITH	EFL	NEO
Al-Nassr		1–2	3–1	5–1	3–1	4–1	5–0	3–0
Al-Ahli	1–5		2–3	3–2	2–3	1–0	6–1	5–2
Al-Qadsiah	1–4	2–2		5–0	4–1	2–3	8–1	1–1
Al-Ula	2–5	1–8	2–9		1–0	1–2	1–0	1–1
Al-Hilal	1–4	3–3	4–3	1–1		1–3	5–0	3–0
Al-Ittihad	0–4	1–1	2–1	2–1	2–3		3–2	0–0
Eastern Flames	1–7	3–5	0–9	0–1	0–2	0–3		1–3
NEOM	0–2	0–5	0–6	0–1	1–3	0–2	1–2	

Source: SAFF
Legend: Blue = home team win; Yellow = draw; Red = away team win.

== Positions by round ==
The following table lists the positions of teams after each week of matches. In order to preserve the chronological evolution, any postponed matches are not included in the round at which they were originally scheduled but added to the full round they were played immediately afterward.

Team ╲ Round	1	2	3	4	5	6	7	8	9	10	11	12	13	14
Al-Nassr	1	1	1	1	1	1	1	1	1	1	1	1	1	1
Al-Ahli	2	4	3	4	3	3	5	5	5	5	3	3	2	2
Al-Ittihad	4	2	4	5	4	4	3	2	2	3	2	2	3	3
Al-Qadsiah	5	7	5	3	5	5	4	3	4	4	4	4	4	4
Al-Hilal	3	3	2	2	2	2	2	4	3	2	5	5	5	5
Al-Ula	6	5	7	6	6	6	6	6	6	6	6	6	6	6
NEOM	7	6	6	7	7	7	7	7	7	7	7	7	7	7
Eastern Flames	8	8	8	8	8	8	8	8	8	8	8	8	8	8

Leader and AFC Women's Champions League
Relegation to Saudi Women's First Division League

Source: SAFF

== Season statistics ==
=== Top scorers ===
Rank	Player	Club	Goals
1	(Tanzania) Clara Luvanga	Al-Nassr	24
2	(Brazil) Adriana	Al-Qadsiah	18
3	(Morocco) Ibtissam Jraïdi	Al-Ahli	14
4	(Democratic Republic of the Congo) Naomie Kaba-Kaba	Al-Ahli	13
5	(France) Léa Le Garrec	Al-Qadsiah	12
5	(Nigeria) Asisat Oshoala	Al-Hilal	12
7	(Brazil) Letícia Nunes	Al-Ittihad	8
8	(Brazil) Duda Francelino	Al-Nassr	7
8	(Algeria) Lina Boussaha	Al-Ittihad	7
8	(Venezuela) Oriana Altuve	Eastern Flames	7
8	(Saudi Arabia) Fadwa Khaled	Al-Ahli	7

=== Top assists ===
Rank	Player	Club	Assists
1	(Democratic Republic of the Congo) Naomie Kaba-Kaba	Al-Ahli	13
1	(France) Léa Le Garrec	Al-Qadsiah	13
3	(Saudi Arabia) Sara Al-Hamad	Al-Nassr	7
4	(Brazil) Adriana	Al-Qadisah	6
4	(Ghana) Alice Kusi	Al-Ahli	6
4	(France) Nesrine Bahlouli	Al-Nassr	6
7	(Morocco) Ibtissam Jraïdi	Al-Ahli	5
7	(Democratic Republic of the Congo) Ruth Kipoyi	Al-Nassr	5
7	(Brazil) Kathellen	Al-Nassr	5
7	(Cameroon) Ajara Nchout	Al-Qadisah	5

=== Clean sheets ===
Rank	Player	Club	Clean sheets
1	(Slovenia) Zala Meršnik	Al-Ittihad	3
1	(Brazil) Aline	Al-Ula	3
1	(Saudi Arabia) Sara Khalid	Al-Qadsiah	3
1	(Spain) Noelia Gil	Al-Hilal	3
1	(Saudi Arabia) Mona Abdulrahman	Al-Nassr	3
6	(United States) Lindsey Harris	Al-Ahli	2
7	(France) Manon Heil	NEOM	1
7	(Saudi Arabia) Al-Hanouf Al-Fulayj	Al-Ula	1

=== Hat-tricks ===
Player	For	Against	Result	Date	Ref.
(Venezuela) Oriana Altuve	Eastern Flames	Al-Ahli	3–5 (H)	26 September 2025	
(Brazil) Adriana	Al-Qadsiah	NEOM	6–0 (A)	3 October 2025	
(Brazil) Adriana	Al-Qadsiah	Eastern Flames	8–1 (H)	14 November 2025	
(Brazil) Adriana	Al-Qadsiah	Al-Ula	9–2 (A)	12 February 2026	
(Brazil) Adriana	Al-Qadsiah	Eastern Flames	9–0 (A)	3 April 2026	
(Ghana) Abi Kim	NEOM	Eastern Flames	3–1 (A)	7 November 2025	
(Tanzania) Clara Luvanga	Al-Nassr	NEOM	3–0 (H)	13 November 2025	
(Tanzania) Clara Luvanga	Al-Nassr	Eastern Flames	7–1 (A)	30 January 2026	
(Tanzania) Clara Luvanga	Al-Nassr	Al-Hilal	4–1 (A)	26 March 2026	
(France) Léa Le Garrec	Al-Qadsiah	Al-Ula	9–2 (A)	12 February 2026	
(Morocco) Ibtissam Jraïdi	Al-Ahli	Eastern Flames	6–1 (H)	13 February 2026	
(Morocco) Ibtissam Jraïdi	Al-Ahli	Al-Ula	8–1 (A)	27 March 2026	
(Democratic Republic of the Congo) Naomie Kabakaba	Al-Ahli	Al-Ula	8–1 (A)	27 March 2026	

Notes

1. Adriana's hat-trick against NEOM on 3 October 2025 was reported by Sofascore, and Al-Qadsiah themselves, while the Saudi Arabian Football Federation credited the third goal as an own goal by Al-Juwayer.

== Individual awards ==
=== Monthly awards ===
Month	Manager of the Month		Player of the Month		Goalkeeper of the Month	
Month	Manager	Club	Player	Club	Player	Club
1	(Spain) José Herrera	Al-Hilal	(Nigeria) Asisat Oshoala	Al-Hilal	(Saudi Arabia) Laila Al-Qahtani	Al-Hilal
2	(Jordan) Manar Fraij	Al-Ahli	(Brazil) Adriana	Al-Qadsiah	(Saudi Arabia) Mona Abdulrahman	Al-Nassr
3	(Canada) Carmelina Moscato	Al-Qadsiah	(Brazil) Kathellen	Al-Nassr	(Slovenia) Zala Meršnik	Al-Ittihad
4	(Jordan) Manar Fraij	Al-Ahli	(Morocco) Ibtissam Jraïdi	Al-Ahli	(United States) Lindsey Harris	Al-Ahli

=== Weekly awards ===
==== Goal of the Week ====
Week	Goal of the Week		Ref.
Week	Player	Club	Ref.
1	(France) Léa Le Garrec	Al-Qadsiah	
2	(Saudi Arabia) Manar Al-Enezi	Al-Hilal	
3	(France) Kheira Hamraoui	Al-Hilal	
4	(Portugal) Jéssica Silva	Al-Hilal	
5	(Morocco) Ibtissam Jraïdi	Al-Ahli	
6	(France) Léa Le Garrec	Al-Qadsiah	
7	(Saudi Arabia) Al-Bandry Mubarak	Al-Hilal	
8	(Venezuela) Oriana Altuve	Eastern Flames	
9	(Jordan) Lana Feras	Eastern Flames	
10	(Bosnia and Herzegovina) Selma Kapetanović	Al-Ula	
11	(Bosnia and Herzegovina) Selma Kapetanović	Al-Ula	
12	(Democratic Republic of the Congo) Naomie Kabakaba	Al-Ahli	
13	(Saudi Arabia) Dalia Abu-Laban	Al-Ahli	

==== Team of the Week ====
Week	Goalkeeper	Defenders	Midfielders	Forwards	Ref.
1	(Brazil) Keikei, EFL	(Saudi Arabia) Aseel Ahmed, NSR; (Saudi Arabia) Layan Yousef, NSR; (Brazil) Kathellen, NSR; (Saudi Arabia) Sara Al-Hamad, NSR	(Democratic Republic of the Congo) Naomie Kaba-Kaba, AHL; (Portugal) Andreia Faria, NSR; (Brazil) Duda Francelino, NSR; (Saudi Arabia) Albandry Mubarak, HIL	(Brazil) Letícia Nunes, ITI; (Tanzania) Clara Luvanga, NSR	
2	(France) Manon Heil, NEO	(Saudi Arabia) Hala Khashoggi, ITI; (Nigeria) Ashleigh Plumptre, ITI; (Tunisia) Chaima Abbassi, NEO; (Saudi Arabia) Sara Al-Hamad, NSR	(Saudi Arabia) Manar Al-Enezi, HIL; (Algeria) Lina Boussaha, ITI; (Bosnia and Herzegovina) Selma Kapetanović, ULA; (Portugal) Jéssica Silva, HIL	(Saudi Arabia) Noura Ibrahim, QDS; (Tanzania) Clara Luvanga, NSR	
3	(Saudi Arabia) Sara Khalid, QDS	(Saudi Arabia) Leen Mohammed, HIL; (Brazil) Rayanne Machado, QDS; (Saudi Arabia) Raghad Mukhayzin, QDS; (Saudi Arabia) Mohrah Mutlaq, HIL	(Ghana) Alice Kusi, AHL; (France) Kheira Hamraoui, HIL; (Germany) Dzsenifer Marozsán, QDS; (Democratic Republic of the Congo) Ruth Kipoyi, NSR	(Morocco) Ibtissam Jraïdi, AHL; (Venezuela) Oriana Altuve, EFL	
4	(Brazil) Keikei, EFL	(Saudi Arabia) Dalal Abdullatif, QDS; (Brazil) Rayanne Machado, QDS; (Saudi Arabia) Raghad Mukhayzin, QDS; (Saudi Arabia) Maram Al-Yahya, QDS	(Brazil) Adriana, QDS; (Portugal) Andreia Faria, NSR; (France) Léa Le Garrec, QDS; (Saudi Arabia) Albandry Mubarak, HIL	(Nigeria) Asisat Oshoala, HIL; (Tanzania) Clara Luvanga, NSR	
5	(France) Manon Heil, NEO	(Saudi Arabia) Tahani Al-Zahrani, AHL; (Nigeria) Ashleigh Plumptre, ITI; (Jordan) Ayah Al-Majali, AHL; (Saudi Arabia) Huriyyah Al-Shamrani, AHL	(Brazil) Adriana, QDS; (Portugal) Andreia Faria, NSR; (France) Amel Majri, ULA; (Democratic Republic of the Congo) Ruth Kipoyi NSR	(Algeria) Lina Boussaha, ITI; (Ghana) Abi Kim, NEO	
6	(Brazil) Aline, ULA	(Saudi Arabia) Aseel Ahmed, NSR; (Brazil) Kathellen, NSR; (Brazil) Rayanne Machado, QDS; (Saudi Arabia) Sara Al-Hamad, NSR	(Brazil) Adriana, QDS; (France) Léa Le Garrec, QDS; (Iceland) Sara Gunnarsdóttir, QDS; (Saudi Arabia) Nadiyah Al-Dhidan ULA	(Brazil) Letícia Nunes, ITI; (Tanzania) Clara Luvanga, NSR	
7	(Spain) Noelia Gil, HIL	(Saudi Arabia) Layan Jouhari, ITI; (Nigeria) Ashleigh Plumptre, ITI; (Brazil) Kathellen, NSR; (Saudi Arabia) Leen Mohammed, HIL	(Nigeria) Francisca Ordega, ITI; (France) Nesrine Bahlouli, NSR; (Spain) María Díaz, ITI; (Democratic Republic of the Congo) Ruth Kipoyi NSR	(Algeria) Lina Boussaha, ITI; (Tanzania) Clara Luvanga, NSR	
8	(Brazil) Aline, ULA	(Saudi Arabia) Tahani Al-Zahrani, AHL; (Nigeria) Ashleigh Plumptre, ITI; (Brazil) Rayanne Machado, QDS; (Saudi Arabia) Sara Al-Hamad, NSR	(Democratic Republic of the Congo) Naomie Kabakaba, AHL; (Portugal) Andreia Faria, NSR; (France) Léa Le Garrec, QDS; (Brazil) Letícia Nunes, ITI	(Ghana) Alice Kusi, AHL; (Tanzania) Clara Luvanga, NSR	
9	(Brazil) Aline, ULA	(Nigeria) Ashleigh Plumptre, ITI; (Brazil) Tuani Lemos, ULA; (Brazil) Duda Francelino, NSR; (Saudi Arabia) Sara Al-Hamad, NSR	(Algeria) Lina Boussaha, ITI; (Jordan) Lana Feras, EFL; (Morocco) Ghizlane Chebbak, HIL	(Saudi Arabia) Seba Tawfiq, ITI; (Nigeria) Asisat Oshoala, HIL; (Democratic Republic of the Congo) Ruth Kipoyi, NSR	
10	(Saudi Arabia) Mona Abdulrahman, NSR	(Saudi Arabia) Munirah Al-Ghanam, QDS; (Germany) Dzsenifer Marozsán, QDS; (Cameroon) Claudia Dabda, HIL; (Saudi Arabia) Sara Al-Hamad, NSR	(Brazil) Adriana, QDS; (Morocco) Ghizlane Chebbak, HIL; (Morocco) Ibtissam Jraïdi, AHL; (Democratic Republic of the Congo) Ruth Kipoyi, NSR	(France) Léa Le Garrec, QDS; (Democratic Republic of the Congo) Naomie Kabakaba, AHL	
11	(Brazil) Keikei, EFL	(Saudi Arabia) Munirah Al-Ghanam, QDS; (Germany) Dzsenifer Marozsán, QDS; (Jordan) Ayah Al-Majali, AHL; (Saudi Arabia) Dalal Abdullatif, QDS	(Democratic Republic of the Congo) Naomie Kabakaba, AHL; (Portugal) Andreia Faria, NSR; (Ghana) Alice Kusi, AHL; (Saudi Arabia) Lamar Balkhudher, ITI	(Nigeria) Asisat Oshoala, HIL; (Brazil) Letícia Nunes, ITI	
12	(United States) Lindsey Harris, AHL	(Saudi Arabia) Aseel Ahmed, NSR; (Saudi Arabia) Raghad Mukhayzin, AHL; (Jordan) Ayah Al-Majali, AHL; (Saudi Arabia) Sara Al-Hamad, NSR	(Saudi Arabia) Fadwa Khaled, AHL; (Ghana) Alice Kusi, AHL; (Morocco) Ibtissam Jraïdi, AHL; (Democratic Republic of the Congo) Naomie Kabakaba, AHL	(Venezuela) Oriana Altuve, EFL; (Tanzania) Clara Luvanga, NSR	

=== Team of the Season ===
Announced 25 April 2026

POSITION	PLAYER	CLUB
GK	(Brazil) Aline Reis	Al-Ula
RB	(Saudi Arabia) Sara Al-Hamad	Al-Nassr
CB	(Brazil) Maria Eduarda da Silva	Al-Nassr
CB	(Brazil) Kathellen Feitoza	Al-Nassr
LB	(Saudi Arabia) Leen Al-Blehid	Al-Hilal
MF	(Brazil) Adriana da Silva	Al-Qadsiah
MF	(Algeria) Lina Boussaha	Al-Ittihad
MF	(France) Léa Le Garrec	Al-Qadsiah
MF	(Democratic Republic of the Congo) Naomie Kabakaba	Al-Ahli
FW	(Tanzania) Clara Luvanga	Al-Nassr
FW	(Morocco) Ibtissam Jraïdi	Al-Ahli

== See also ==
- 2025–26 Saudi Women's Cup
- 2025 Saudi Women's Premier Challenge Cup – Winter edition
