= 2026 WAFF Women's Clubs Championship =

بطولة اتحاد غرب آسيا لأندية السيدات
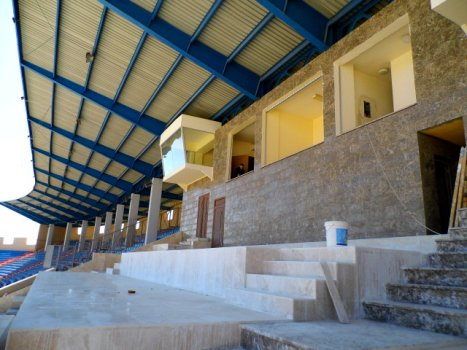
- The Prince Mohammed Stadium hosted the tournament.

Tournament details
- Host country: Jordan
- City: Zarqa
- Dates: 28 July – 5 August 2026
- Teams: 6 (from 1 sub-confederation)
- Venue: 1 (in 1 host city)

Final positions
- Champions: (Saudi Arabia) Al-Nassr (1st title)
- Runners-up: (Syria) Al-Hilal

Tournament statistics
- Matches played: 9
- Goals scored: 36 (4 per match)
- Top scorer(s): Clara Luvanga (Al-Nassr) (7 goals)
- Best player: Nesrine Bahlouli (Al-Nassr)
- Best goalkeeper: Mona Abdulrahman (Al-Nassr)

The 2026 WAFF Women's Clubs Championship was the third edition of the WAFF Women's Clubs Championship, the West Asian women's club football championship organised by the West Asian Football Federation.

Due to be hosted by Saudi Arabia in November 2024, the tournament was postponed to a later date due to security concerns arising from the 2024 Iran–Israel conflict. In June 2026, it was announced that the tournament would be hosted by Jordan in July–August 2026.

Safa, the defending champions, were unable to defend their title following the team's dissolution in 2022.

Al-Nassr achieved their first title, after defeating Al-Hilal of Syria 4–0 in the final.

== Teams ==
Six teams will participate in the tournament. The draw was held on 30 June 2026.

Association	Team	Qualifying method	App. (last)
Iraq	Naft Al-Shamal	Selected by the Iraq Football Association	2nd (2022)
Jordan	Etihad	2025–26 Jordan Women's Pro League champions	1st
Lebanon	Beirut Football Academy	2024–25 Lebanese Women's Football League champions	1st
Saudi Arabia	Al-Nassr	2025–26 Saudi Women's Premier League champions	1st
Syria	Al-Hilal	2025–26 Syrian Women's Football League champions	1st
United Arab Emirates	Banaat	2025–26 UAE Women's Football League champions	1st

== Group stage ==
=== Group A ===
Pos	Team	Pld	W	D	L	GF	GA	GD	Pts	Qualification
1	(United Arab Emirates) Banaat	2	1	0	1	6	3	+3	3	Advance to knockout stage
2	(Jordan) Etihad	2	1	0	1	3	3	0	3	Advance to knockout stage
3	(Lebanon) Beirut Football Academy	2	1	0	1	1	4	−3	3	

Source: Global Sports Archive
Rules for classification: Tiebreakers
28 July 2026
20:00

Etihad (Jordan)	0–1	(Lebanon) Beirut Football Academy
	Report	El Hage Ali 7'

Prince Mohammed Stadium, Zarqa

30 July 2026
17:00

Banaat (United Arab Emirates)	4–0	(Lebanon) Beirut Football Academy
Forshaw 24'; Yeboah 66', 78'; Mamay 86'	Report

Prince Mohammed Stadium, Zarqa

1 August 2026
20:00

Etihad (Jordan)	3–2	(United Arab Emirates) Banaat
T. Al-Zabrey 45+5'; Feras 48' (pen.), 90' (pen.)	Report	Mamay 7' (pen.); Forshaw 73'

Prince Mohammed Stadium, Zarqa

=== Group B ===
Pos	Team	Pld	W	D	L	GF	GA	GD	Pts	Qualification
1	(Saudi Arabia) Al-Nassr	2	2	0	0	14	0	+14	6	Advance to knockout stage
2	(Syria) Al-Hilal	2	0	1	1	1	6	−5	1	Advance to knockout stage
3	(Iraq) Naft Al-Shamal	2	0	1	1	1	10	−9	1	

Source: Global Sports Archive
Rules for classification: Tiebreakers
28 July 2026
17:00

Al-Hilal (Syria)	0–5	(Saudi Arabia) Al-Nassr
	Report	Al-Harthi 28', 77'; Faria 38'; Al-Isa 45+3'; Luvanga 53'

Prince Mohammed Stadium, Zarqa

30 July 2026
20:00

Naft Al-Shamal (Iraq)	0–9	(Saudi Arabia) Al-Nassr
	Report	Bahlouli 14'; Luvanga 23', 33', 77'; Kwofie 43' (o.g.); Al-Isa 53', 90+3'; Al-Saiari 61'; Faria 76'

Prince Mohammed Stadium, Zarqa

1 August 2026
17:00

Al-Hilal (Syria)	1–1	(Iraq) Naft Al-Shamal
Haji 26'	Report	Jawdhari 61'

Prince Mohammed Stadium, Zarqa

== Knockout stage ==
=== Bracket ===
Semi-finals
3 August – Prince Mohammed Stadium
(United Arab Emirates) Banaat	1
(Syria) Al-Hilal	2
3 August – Prince Mohammed Stadium
(Saudi Arabia) Al-Nassr	3
(Jordan) Etihad	0

Final
5 August – Prince Mohammed Stadium
(Syria) Al-Hilal	0
(Saudi Arabia) Al-Nassr	4

=== Semi-finals ===
3 August 2026
17:00

Banaat (United Arab Emirates)	1–2	(Syria) Al-Hilal
Al-Adwan 72'	Report	Al-Jany 45+3', 65'

Prince Mohammed Stadium, Zarqa

3 August 2026
20:00

Al-Nassr (Saudi Arabia)	3–0	(Jordan) Etihad
Faria 6'; Bahlouli 41'; Luvanga 45'	Report

Prince Mohammed Stadium, Zarqa

=== Final ===
5 August 2026
18:00

Al-Hilal (Syria)	0–4	(Saudi Arabia) Al-Nassr
	Report	Al-Isa 29', 62'; Luvanga 48', 69'

Prince Mohammed Stadium, Zarqa

== Goalscorers ==
Team eliminated / inactive for this round.

Rank	Player	Team	MD1	MD2	MD3	SF	3RD	FNL	Total
1	(Tanzania) Clara Luvanga	(Saudi Arabia) Al-Nassr	1	3		1		2	7
2	(Bahrain) Hessa Al-Isa	(Saudi Arabia) Al-Nassr	1	2				2	5
3	(Portugal) Andreia Faria	(Saudi Arabia) Al-Nassr	1	1		1			3
4	(Saudi Arabia) Khloud Al-Harthi	(Saudi Arabia) Al-Nassr	2						2
4	(Ghana) Jennifer Yeboah	(United Arab Emirates) Banaat		2					2
4	(United Arab Emirates) Elizabeth Forshaw	(United Arab Emirates) Banaat		1	1				2
4	(Tunisia) Sabrine Mamay	(United Arab Emirates) Banaat		1	1				2
4	(Jordan) Lana Feras	(Jordan) Etihad			2				2
4	(France) Nesrine Bahlouli	(Saudi Arabia) Al-Nassr		1		1			2
4	(Syria) Mai Al-Jany	(Syria) Al-Hilal				2			2

== Awards ==
- Top Scorer: (Tanzania) Clara Luvanga (Al-Nassr)
- Best Player: (France) Nesrine Bahlouli (Al-Nassr)
- Best Goalkeeper: (Saudi Arabia) Mona Abdulrahman (Al-Nassr)

== See also ==
- 2026 SAFF Women's Club Championship
- 2026–27 AFC Women's Champions League
