= Yuki Watari =

Japanese-Brazilian footballer (born 2000)

Personal information
- Full name: Sayuri Yuki Watari
- Date of birth: 13 June 2000 (age 26)
- Place of birth: Saitama, Japan
- Height: 1.61 m (5 ft 3 in)
- Position: Midfielder

Team information
- Current team: Al-Nassr
- Number: 17

Youth career
- Honjo Sumire
- 2013–2017: Urawa Red Diamonds
- 2018–2019: FC Ryukyu

College career
Years	Team	Apps	(Gls)
2019–2022	UT Southern FireHawks	85	(77)

Senior career*
Years	Team	Apps	(Gls)
2022–2023	Nashville Rhythm FC	–	(23)
2023–2024	FC Juárez	22	(8)
2024–2026	Tampa Bay Sun	0	(0)
2026	West Florida Flames	2	(0)
2026–	Al-Nassr	0	(0)
- * Club domestic league appearances and goals as of December 20, 2025

Sayuri Yuki Watari (渡 ユキ, Watari Yuki; born 13 June 2000) is a Japanese professional footballer who plays as a midfielder for Saudi Women's Premier League club Al-Nassr. She played college soccer for the UT Southern FireHawks and led the team to the NAIA championship in 2021, earning NAIA national player of the year honors. She began her professional career with FC Juárez in 2023.

== Early life ==
Watari was born in Saitama Prefecture, Japan, to Brazilian parents, and has an older brother. She began playing football at age nine and soon joined the Urawa Red Diamonds academy. She later moved to Okinawa Prefecture and joined FC Ryukyu at age seventeen. She received several scholarship offers to play college soccer in the United States but did not have good enough TOEFL scores for many of them and ended up accepting an offer at the NAIA–level Martin Methodist College (later the University of Tennessee Southern). She grew up aspiring to play for the Brazil national team.

== College career ==
Watari scored 19 goals in 22 games for the Martin Methodist RedHawks as a freshman in 2019, being named the Southern States Athletic Conference Freshman of the Year and third-team All-American by the National Association of Intercollegiate Athletics (NAIA). She scored 19 goals in 18 games as a sophomore in 2020, earning first-team All-American honors after leading the NAIA with 8 game-winning goals. She also helped lead the RedHawks to the Mid-South Conference regular-season title in their first season in the conference.

Watari scored 17 goals and led the NAIA with a career-high 26 assists in 23 games in her junior year in 2021, being named the Mid-South Player of the Year. She led the renamed UT Southern RedHawks to the third NAIA championship in program history and was named the championship MVP. She was named the NAIA Player of the Year by United Soccer Coaches. She was named team captain in her senior year in 2022. She scored a career-high 21 goals in 24 games and was named first-team All-Mid-South and first-team NAIA All-American for the third consecutive time (her fourth NAIA All-American selection in four years). Her career totals of 77 goals and 69 assists were the most in program history.

During college, Watari also played for Nashville Rhythm FC in the Women's Premier Soccer League (WPSL) alongside several other Japanese-born college soccer players.

== Club career ==
In July 2023, Watari signed her first professional contract with Liga MX Femenil club FC Juárez. On 29 July, she scored two goals in her professional debut in a 3–2 loss to Atlas. She was the first Japanese-born player to play in the Liga MX Femenil and the second Japanese player overall after Akemi Yokoyama. In March 2024, she sprained her left ankle and missed two months with injury. She played in 22 league games and scored 8 goals in her only season with FC Juárez.

In June 2024, Watari joined USL Super League club Tampa Bay Sun before the league's inaugural season. The following month, she tore her anterior cruciate ligament (ACL) and was expected to miss the entire campaign. Shortly before she was set to return in June 2025, she tore the ACL in her other knee and remained sidelined as the Sun won the inaugural USL Super League championship. In June 2026, after two injury-tested years in Tampa Bay, she was released without having made an appearance and thanked by the Sun for the "positivity and the energy you shared with this club".

After returning to the pitch with West Florida Flames in the WPSL, Watari joined Saudi Women's Premier League club Al-Nassr in July 2026. She debuted for Al-Nassr in their 5–0 win over Syrian side Al-Hilal at the WAFF Women's Clubs Championship, becoming the first Japanese woman to play for a Saudi club. She was sidelined by a new injury sustained in the final of the competition.

== Honors and awards ==
UT Southern FireHawks

- NAIA women's soccer championship: 2021
- Mid-South Conference: 2020, 2021
- Mid-South Conference tournament: 2021

Tampa Bay Sun

- USL Super League: 2024–25

Al-Nassr

- WAFF Women's Clubs Championship: 2026

Individual

- United Soccer Coaches NAIA Player of the Year: 2021
- First-team NAIA All-American: 2020, 2021, 2022
- Third-team NAIA All-American: 2019
- First-team All-Mid-South: 2020, 2021, 2022
- First-team All-SSAC: 2019
- Mid-South Player of the Year: 2021
- SSAC Freshman of the Year: 2019
- NAIA championship MVP: 2021
