= Reema =

Reema is a feminine given name of Arabic origin. Notable people with the name include:

== Given name ==
- Reema Abdo (born 1963), Yemen-born Canadian backstroke swimmer who competed in the 1984 Summer Olympics
- Reema Juffali (born 1992), Saudi Arabian racing driver
- Reema Kagti (born 1972), Indian film director and screenwriter
- Reema Khan (born 1971), Pakistani film actress and producer, often billed as "Reema"
- Reema Lagoo (1958–2017), Indian Hindi and Marathi film and television actress
- Reema Lamba (screen name Mallika Sherawat, born 1976), Indian actress who works in Hindi, English and Chinese language films
- Reema Major (born 1995), Sudan-born Canadian rapper
- Reema Malhotra (born 1980), Indian international cricketer
- Reema Al-Malki (born 1998), Saudi footballer
- Reema Nagra, Canadian Punjabi-speaking actress and producer
- Reema Rakesh Nath, Indian film writer, director and producer
- Reema Sen (born 1981), Indian actress in Tamil and Telugu films
