= Rema Al-Thakafi =

Saudi footballer (born 1998)

Rema Al Thakafi
Personal information
- Full name: Rema Rizq Allah Al Thakafi
- Date of birth: 24 December 1998 (age 27)
- Place of birth: Saudi Arabia
- Position: Midfielder

Team information
- Current team: NEOM
- Number: 18

Senior career*
Years	Team	Apps	(Gls)
2020–2022	Miras		
2022–2024	Al-Ahli		
2024–	NEOM		

International career
2023–	Saudi Arabia	1	(0)
- * Club domestic league appearances and goals

Rema Rizq Allah Al-Thakafi (Arabic: ريما رزق الله الثقفي; born 24 December 1998) is a Saudi footballer who plays as a midfielder for Saudi Women's First Division League club NEOM.

== Club career ==
Rema started her career in the Miras team.

Since Al-Ahli acquired Miras in 2022, Rema continued to play in the midfield position with Jordanian coach Manar Fraij.

== International career ==
Rema got her first call-up for the Saudi Arabia national team in 5 May 2023, to participate in friendlies against Palestine.

On 7 May 2023, she made her debut for the team after she came as substitute for Talah Al-Ghamdi in the 85th minute against Palestine.

== Honours ==
=== Club ===
Al-Ahli

- SAFF Women's Cup:

(gold) Champion: 2023–24
