= Manon Heil =

French association football player (born 1997)

Personal information
- Full name: Manon Heil
- Date of birth: 11 March 1997 (age 29)
- Place of birth: Strasbourg, France
- Position: Goalkeeper

Team information
- Current team: Neom
- Number: 1

Senior career*
Years	Team	Apps	(Gls)
2012–2017	FC Vendenheim		
2017–2018	Strasbourg Vauban		
2018–2019	ESAP Metz		
2019–2020	Nancy		
2020–2025	FC Fleury 91	37	(0)
2025–	Neom		

International career
2012	France U16	2	(0)
2012–2013	France U17	11	(0)
2015–2016	France U19	9	(0)
- * Club domestic league appearances and goals

Manon Heil (born 11 March 1997) is a French footballer who plays as a goalkeeper for Saudi Women's Premier League club Neom.

== Early life ==
Heil started playing football at a young age.

== Club career ==
Heil started her career with French side FC Vendenheim. In 2020, she signed for French side FC Fleury 91, where she was regarded as one of the club's most important players.

== International career ==
Heil first called up to represent France internationally at the 2022 Tournoi de France.

== Personal life ==
Heil has a son.
