= WAFF Women's Clubs Championship =

West Asian women's football competition

- Competition logo
- Organiser(s): WAFF
- Founded: 2019; 7 years ago
- Region: West Asia (WAFF)
- Teams: 6 (in 2026)
- Current champions: (Saudi Arabia) Al-Nassr (1st title)
- Most championships: (Lebanon) Safa (Jordan) Shabab Ordon; Al-Nassr (1 title each)
- Website: the-waff.com
- 2026 WAFF Women's Clubs Championship

The WAFF Women's Clubs Championship (Arabic: بطولة غرب آسيا لأندية السيدات) is an international women's association football competition. It involves club teams from countries affiliated with the West Asian governing body WAFF. The competition was first played in 2019, with five teams participating at the time. Al-Nassr are the current champions, having won the 2026 edition.

== Results ==
No	Edition	Champions	Runners-up	Venue	Teams	Player of the tournament
1	2019	(Jordan) Shabab Al-Ordon	(Lebanon) SAS	(Jordan) Aqaba Development Corporation Stadium, Amman	5	
2	2022	(Lebanon) Safa	(Jordan) Orthodox Club	(Jordan) Prince Mohammed Stadium, Zarqa	4	(Jordan) Shahnaz Jebreen (Orthodox)
3	2026	(Saudi Arabia) Al-Nassr	(Syria) Al-Hilal	(Jordan) Prince Mohammed Stadium, Zarqa	6	(France) Nesrine Bahlouli (Al-Nassr)

== Records and statistics ==
=== Performances by club ===
Performances in the WAFF Women's Clubs Championship by club
Club	Titles	Runners-up	Seasons won	Seasons runner-up
(Jordan) Shabab Al-Ordon	1	0	2019	—
(Lebanon) Safa	1	0	2022	—
(Lebanon) Al-Nassr	1	0	2026	—
(Lebanon) SAS	0	1	—	2019
(Jordan) Orthodox	0	1	—	2022
(Lebanon) Al-Hilal	0	1	2026	—

=== Performances by nation ===
Performances in finals by nation
Nation	Titles	Runners-up	Total
Jordan	1	1	2
Lebanon	1	1	2
Saudi Arabia	1	0	1

=== All-time scorers ===
As of 3 October 2026

	Player	Country	Goals	Club(s)
1	Hessa Al-Isa	Bahrain	10	Riffa; Al-Nassr
2	Alice Kusi	Ghana	9	Shabab Ordon
3	Clara Luvanga	Tanzania	7	Al-Nassr
4	Rafinha	Brazil	4	Abu Dhabi
5	Yara Bou Rada	Lebanon	3	SAS, Safa

== See also ==
- FIFA Women's Club World Cup
  - AFC Women's Champions League
    - SAFF Club Women's Championship
    - WAFF Women's Clubs Championship
  - CAF Women's Champions League
  - Copa Libertadores Femenina
  - UEFA Women's Champions League
- International competitions in women's association football
