= Etaf Al-Sawi =

Palestinian footballer (born 2002

Personal information
- Full name: Etaf Nabeel Al-Sawi
- Date of birth: 8 January 2003 (age 23)
- Height: 1.60 m (5 ft 3 in)
- Position: Defender

Team information
- Current team: Al-Nassr

Senior career*
Years	Team	Apps	(Gls)
- Al-Muharraq
2022–	Al-Nassr	16	(0)

International career^{‡}
2023–	Palestine		
- * Club domestic league appearances and goals as of 30 December 2023 ‡ National team caps and goals as of 21 July 2023

Etaf Nabeel Al-Sawi (Arabic: عطاف نبيل الصاوي; born 8 January 2003) is a Palestinian women's international footballer who plays as a midfielder for Al-Nassr and the Palestine national football team.

== Early life ==
Al-Sawi was born to Nabeel Al-Sawi, a Palestinian-Jordanian, who was her first football coach.

== Club career ==
=== Football ===
Al-Sawi played for the Saudi Arabian side Al Nassr, where she was described as having "succeeded in winning the Women’s Premier League title in its first edition. She was one of the team’s most prominent stars, as she presented an amazing performance in which she demonstrated her football talent".

=== Futsal ===
Al-Sawi played futsal in Bahrain, helping the club win the league.

== International career ==
In April 2023, Al-Sawi got her first call-up to the senior Palestinian women's team to participate in two friendly matches against Saudi Arabia. On May 2, 2023, Al-Sawi announced on her Instagram that she had withdrawn from the team for personal reasons and expressed her intention to represent Palestine in the future.

== Style of play ==
Al-Sawi has been described as someone who "occupies the position of a playmaker and is proficient in defensive line positions".

== Personal life ==
Al- Sawi holds both Palestinian and Jordanian nationalities.

Al-Sawi regards Croatia international Luka Modrić as her football idol.

== Honours ==
- Al Nassr
- Saudi Women's Premier League: 2022–23,
  2023–24
- Saudi–Jordanian Women's Clubs Championship third place: 2023
