= Shomokh Al-Hawsawi =

Saudi footballer (born 2003)

Personal information
- Full name: Shomokh Osama Abubakor Al-Hawsawi
- Date of birth: 11 August 2003 (age 23)
- Place of birth: Saudi Arabia
- Position: Forward

Team information
- Current team: NEOM
- Number: 11

Senior career*
| Years | Team | Apps | (Gls) |
| 2022–2023 | Al-Ahli | | |
| 2023–2025 | Jeddah | | |
| 2025– | NEOM | | |
- * Club domestic league appearances and goals

Shomokh Osama Abubakor Al-Hawsawi (Arabic: شموخ أسامة أبوبكر الهوساوي; born 11 August 2003) is a Saudi footballer who plays as a Forward for Saudi Women's Premier League club NEOM.

== Club career ==
Shomokh Al-Hawsawi began playing with Al-Ahli, participating with them in the first edition of the 2022–23 Saudi Women's Premier League.

In the following season, 2023/2024, she moved to Jeddah in the Saudi Women's First Division League.

In the summer of 2025, Al-Hawsawi moved to NEOM, to participate with them in the 2025–26 Saudi Women's Premier League and play in the center-back position with French coach Fabrice Abriel.

== Personal life ==
Her sister, Moluk Al-Hawsawi, plays football in the Saudi Women's Premier League.
