= Reema Al-Malki =

Saudi footballer (born 1998)

Personal information
- Full name: Reema Mohammed Al-Malki
- Date of birth: 29 July 1998 (age 28)
- Place of birth: Saudi Arabia
- Position: Defender

Team information
- Current team: Al-Nassr
- Number: 2

Senior career*
Years	Team	Apps	(Gls)
2017–2022	Eastern Flames		
2022–2023	Al-Nassr		
2023–2024	Al-Qadsiah		
2024–	Al-Nassr	2	(0)
- * Club domestic league appearances and goals

Reema Mohammed Al-Malki (Arabic: ريما محمد المالكي; born 29 July 1998) is a Saudi footballer who plays as a defender for Saudi Women's Premier League side Al-Nassr.

== Club career ==
Al-Malki played for Eastern Flames.

She won the 2022/2023 Saudi Women's Premier League with Al Nassr.

In the 2023/2024 season, Al-Malki moved to Al Qadsiah, where Portuguese coach Luís Andrade relied on her in the left-back position and carried the captaincy in some Saudi Women's Premier League and SAFF Women's Cup matches.

On 25 August 2024, Al Nassr announced the return of Al-Malki to the team.

== Honours ==
=== Club ===
Al Nassr

- Saudi Women's Premier League:

(gold) Champion: 2022–23

Al Qadsiah

- SAFF Women's Cup:

(bronze) Third place: 2023–24
