= Clara Luvanga =

Tanzanian footballer (born 2005)

- Luvanga with the Washington Spirit in 2026

Personal information
- Full name: Clara Cleitus Luvanga
- Date of birth: 25 February 2005 (age 21)
- Place of birth: Tanzania
- Position: Forward

Team information
- Current team: Washington Spirit
- Number: 25

Youth career
- Yanga Princess

Senior career*
Years	Team	Apps	(Gls)
–2023	Yanga Princess		
2023	Dux Logroño	6	(2)
2023–2026	Al-Nassr	35	(44)
2026–	Washington Spirit	5	(2)

International career^{‡}
2022	Tanzania U17	6	(10)
2021–2022	Tanzania U20	6	(2)
2024–	Tanzania	1	(0)
- * Club domestic league appearances and goals as of 05:26, 15 November 2026 (UTC) ‡ National team caps and goals as of 11 November 2026

Clara Cleitus Luvanga (born 25 February 2005) is a Tanzanian professional footballer who plays as a striker for the Washington Spirit of the National Women's Soccer League (NWSL) and the Tanzania national team.

== Club career ==
In August 2023, Luvanga signed with the Spanish Second division side Dux Logroño. She made her official debut under a DUX Logroño shirt on August 30 against UDL and helped them with a 7-0 victory. She went on to play a total of six games and score two goals before leaving the club to join Al Nassr.

In October 2023, Luvanga joined Saudi Women's Premier League side Al-Nassr. On 13 October 2023, she debuted for Al-Nassr in a 6–0 win over Al-Riyadh. On 3 November 2023, she scored her first goal, scoring a brace against Eastern Flames. She won three consecutive league titles with the club, securing the league golden boot with 24 goals in the 2025–26 season. She also scored a hat trick that season in the Saudi Women's Cup final and won the WAFF Women's Clubs Championship.

On 9 September 2026, the Washington Spirit announced the signing of Luvanga on a four-year contract, making her the first Tanzanian in the National Women's Soccer League (NWSL).

== International career ==
Luvanga was the top scorer of 2022 African U-17 Women's World Cup qualification with ten goals.

== Personal life ==
Luvanga is a member of the Hehe people.

== Honours ==
Al-Nassr

- Saudi Women's Premier League: 2023–24, 2024–25, 2025–26
- Saudi Women's Cup: 2025–26
- Saudi Women's Super Cup: 2025, 2026
- WAFF Women's Clubs Championship: 2026

Individual

- Saudi Women's Premier League top scorer: 2025–26
