= Shaikha Al-Asiri =

Saudi footballer (born 2004)

Shaikhah Asiri
Personal information
- Full name: Shaikhah Ghalib Hassan Asiri
- Date of birth: 10 July 2004 (age 22)
- Place of birth: Saudi Arabia
- Position: Forward

Team information
- Current team: Al-Nassr
- Number: 18

Senior career*
Years	Team	Apps	(Gls)
2023–2024	Eastern Flames FC		
2024–2025	Al-Taraji		
2025–	Al-Nassr		

International career
2023	Saudi Arabia U20		
- * Club domestic league appearances and goals

Shaikhah Ghalib Hassan Asiri (Arabic: شَيْخَة غَالِب حَسَن عَسِيرِيّ; born 10 July 2004) is a Saudi footballer who plays as a forward for Saudi Women's Premier League club Eastern Flames FC.

== Club career ==
In March 2023, Asiri was selected among the 11 best players from the Girls’ Schools League known as Dawri Madaris to participate with them in a training camp held in Barcelona.

Eastern Flames FC has signed a contract with Asiri, to play with them in the 2023-24 season of the Saudi Women's Premier League.

In May 2024, Asiri played with Eastern Flames in the second edition of the Saudi Women's Futsal Tournament.

== International career ==
On 5 December 2023, Asiri joined the first roster of the newly founded Saudi Arabia u-20 women's national football team with Scottish coach Pauline Hamill.
