= Reem Al-Beloshi =

Saudi footballer (born 2001)

Personal information
- Full name: Reem Adel Al-Beloshi
- Date of birth: 21 January 2001 (age 25)
- Place of birth: Saudi Arabia
- Position: Goalkeeper

Team information
- Current team: Al-Nassr
- Number: 88

Senior career*
Years	Team	Apps	(Gls)
2022–	Al-Nassr	6	(0)

International career
2024–	Saudi Arabia		
- * Club domestic league appearances and goals

Reem Adel Al-Beloshi (Arabic: ريم عادل البلوشي; born 21 January 2001) is a Saudi footballer who plays as a goalkeeper for Saudi Women's Premier League team Al-Nassr.

== Club career ==
Al-Beloshi was with Al Nassr in the 2022–23 season of the Saudi Women's Premier League.

== International career ==
Al-Beloshi got her first call-up for the Saudi Arabia national team on 25 December 2023, to participate in friendlies against Syria.

== Honours ==
=== Club ===
Al-Nassr

- Saudi Women's Premier League: 2022–23, 2023–24
