= Al-Nassr FC (women) =

Women's association football club in Saudi Arabia

Al-Nassr Women
- Full name: Al-Nassr Women's Football Club
- Nicknames: Sayidat Al-Aalami (The Global Ladies); Fatayat Al-Shams (Sun Girls)
- Founded: 2018; 8 years ago as Al-Mamlaka WFC; 2022; 4 years ago as Al-Nassr WFC
- Ground: Prince Abdulrahman Stadium; Al-Awwal Park (selected matches)
- Capacity: 15,000
- Owner(s): Public Investment Fund (75%); Al-Nassr Non-Profit Foundation (25%)
- President: Abdullah Al-Majid
- Head coach: Abdulaziz Al-Alwni
- League: Saudi Women's Premier League
- 2025–26: SWPL, 1st of 8 (Champions)
- Website: alnassr.sa
Home colours	Away colours	Third colours

Al-Nassr Women's Football Club, commonly known as Al-Nassr Ladies (Arabic: سيدات النصر), is a Saudi Arabian professional women's football club based in Riyadh. The club competes in the Saudi Women's Premier League, the top tier of women's football in Saudi Arabia.

== History ==
=== 2018–2022: Founding and Al-Mamlaka era ===
In 2018, the club was founded as Al-Mamlaka Women's Football Club (Arabic: فريق المملكة النسائي) by Munira Al-Hamdan and Lujain Kashgari, and was based in Dammam. In 2019, Al-Mamlaka participated in the first Gulf Women's Football Championship, hosted in Saudi Arabia. The club participated in the Women's Community Football League, the first national competition for women in Saudi Arabia. The club finished as runners-up to Eastern Flames and were eliminated in the group stage. In 2021, Al-Mamlaka participated in the inaugural women's championship organized by the Saudi Arabian Football Federation, where they again finished runners-up behind Eastern Flames. The second-place finish qualified Al-Mamlaka for the final stage of the SAFF National Women's League. In the final stages, the team emerged victorious, winning the first official Saudi women's competition.

=== 2022–present: Al-Nassr era ===
In September 2022, Al-Nassr acquired the team to be its women's section to participate in the inaugural 2022–23 Saudi Women's Premier League. On 13 October 2022, the team played its first-ever match in the 2022–23 Women's Premier League, achieving a resounding 18–0 victory over Sama to kick off their competitive record. The club won the inaugural edition, becoming the first-ever champions of the competition. In the following season, Al-Nassr won its second consecutive title, qualifying them for the inaugural 2024–25 AFC Women's Champions League, becoming the first Saudi team to participate in the competition.

== Kits ==
Period	Kit manufacturer	main sponsor
2022–2023	Duneus	None
2023–2024	Nike	None
2024–2025	Adidas	KAFD
2025–	Adidas	AviLease

== Players ==
=== Current squad ===
As of 8 February 2025

Note: Flags indicate national team as defined under FIFA eligibility rules; some limited exceptions apply. Players may hold more than one non-FIFA nationality.

No.	Pos.	Nation	Player
2	DF	KSA	Reema Al-Malki
3	DF	KSA	Wade Al-Masari
4	DF	KSA	Latifa Al-Nawfawi
5	MF	KSA	Layan Al-Fathi
6	MF	KSA	Aseel Ahmed
7	MF	KSA	Basmah Al-Shnaifi
8	MF	KSA	Sara Al-Hamad
9	FW	TAN	Clara Luvanga
10	FW	KSA	Mubarkh Al-Saiari
11	FW	COD	Ruth Kipoyi
12	FW	KSA	Dalal Abdulwasi
15	FW	KSA	Rinas Saleh
16	FW	KSA	Ghader Abdulwahed
17	MF	JPN	Yuki Watari

No.	Pos.	Nation	Player
20	MF	BRA	Duda Francelino
21	GK	KSA	Mona Abdulrahman
22	DF	KSA	Shuruq Al-Hwsawi
23	FW	KSA	Mawadah Al-Maghrabi
25	DF	KSA	Samira Faisal
27	DF	KSA	Kholoud Al-Harthi
66	GK	KSA	Reem Al-Beloshi
69	MF	FRA	Nesrine Bahlouli
71	DF	KSA	Bayan Eisa
80	MF	POR	Andreia Faria (captain)
99	MF	BHR	Hessa Al-Isa
—	DF	KSA	Al-Anood Ahmed
—	MF	KSA	Aida Adel

== Personnel ==
=== Current technical staff ===
Position	Name
Head coach	(Saudi Arabia) Abdulaziz Al-Alwni
Assistant coach	(Indonesia) Rudy Eka Priyambada
Goalkeeping coach	(Spain) Tony Mingual
Fitness coach	(Spain) Raúl Muñoz
Video analyst	TBA
Technical coach	TBA
Head doctor	(Portugal) Carlos Miguel
Chief scout	TBA

=== Management ===
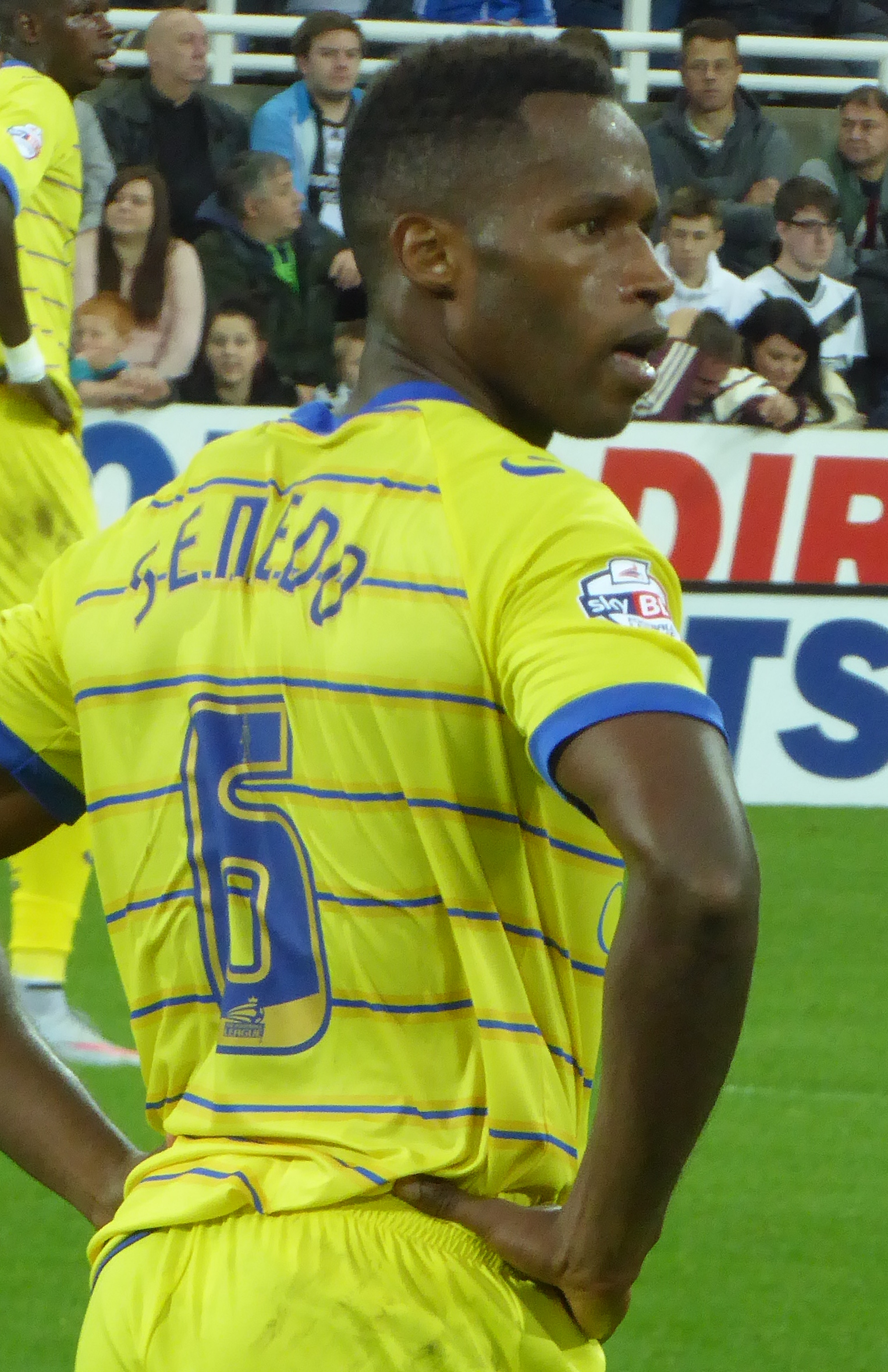
Portuguese former footballer José Semedo, who serves as the current acting CEO of Al-Nassr FC

Position	Name	Ref.
President	(Saudi Arabia) Abdullah Al-Majid	
Chief Executive Officer	(Portugal) José Semedo	
Sporting Director	(Portugal) Simão Coutinho	

- Information as of May 2026

== Honours ==
=== Official ===
Type	Competition	Titles	Seasons
Domestic	Saudi Women's Premier League	4	2022–23, 2023–24, 2024–25, 2025–26
Domestic	Saudi Women's Cup	1	2025–26
Domestic	Saudi Women's Super Cup	1	2025
Domestic	Saudi Women's Premier Challenge Cup	1	2025
Domestic	SAFF Women's Football Championship	1	2021–22
Regional	WAFF Women's Clubs Championship	1	2026

- record

== Record in Asian Football ==
As of 23 August 2026

All results (away, home and aggregate) list Al-Nassr's goal tally first.

Competition	Pld	W	D	L	GF	GA	GD
AFC Women's Champions League	9	4	2	3	21	10	+11
Total	9	4	2	3	21	10	+11

Season	Round	Opponents	Score
2024–25	Preliminary stage	(Myanmar) Myawady	3–0
2024–25	Preliminary stage	(Laos) Young Elephants	3–0
2024–25	Preliminary stage	(United Arab Emirates) Abu Dhabi Country	0–1
2025–26	Preliminary stage	(Thailand) BGC College	0–4
2025–26	Preliminary stage	(Uzbekistan) Nasaf	0–1
2025–26	Preliminary stage	(Nepal) APF	6–1
2026–27	Preliminary stage	(Jordan) Etihad	2–2
2026–27	Preliminary stage	(Iran) Bam Khatoon	1–1
2026–27	Preliminary stage	(Tajikistan) CSKA Dushanbe	12–0

== Season-by-season records ==
Champions	Runners-up	Promoted	Relegated

=== League record ===
Season	Premier League								
Season	Pos	Pld	W	D	L	GF	GA	GD	Pts
2022–23	1st	14	11	2	1	67	19	+48	35
2023–24	1st	14	12	1	1	43	12	+31	37
2024–25	1st	18	17	0	1	70	17	+53	51
2025–26	1st	14	13	0	1	55	12	+43	39

=== Cup and continental record ===
Season	SAFF Cup	Super Cup	Challenge Cup	Champions League
2022–23	—N/a	—N/a	—N/a	—N/a
2023–24	QF	—N/a	—N/a	—N/a
2024–25	SF	—N/a	—N/a	PS
2025–26	C	C	C	PS

== Managers ==
No.	Head coach	Nationality	From	Until	Honours
1	Abdulaziz Al-Alwni	Saudi Arabia	2022	present	4 Saudi Women's Premier League 1 SAFF Women's Football Championship; 1 Saudi Women's Super Cup; 1 Saudi Women's Cup 1 Saudi Women's Premier Challenge Cup

== Notable players ==
Saudi Arabia (SAFF)	Asia (AFC)	Africa (CAF)	Europe (UEFA)	South America (CONMEBOL)
(Saudi Arabia) Sara Khalid; (Saudi Arabia) Basmah Al-Shnaifi; (Saudi Arabia) Mubarkh Al-Saiari; (Saudi Arabia) Reem Al-Beloshi; (Saudi Arabia) Sara Al-Hamad; (Saudi Arabia) Reema Al-Malki	(Palestine) Etaf Al-Sawi; (Bahrain) Yasmeen Fayez; (Bahrain) Hessa Al-Isa	(Algeria) Lina Boussaha; (Tanzania) Clara Luvanga; (Democratic Republic of the Congo) Ruth Kipoyi; (Tunisia) Samia Aouni; (Tunisia) Ghada Ayadi	(France) Aminata Diallo; (France) Nesrine Bahlouli; (Portugal) Andreia Faria	(Brazil) Kathellen; (Brazil) Duda Francelino; (Brazil) Izabela Stahelin

== See also ==
- Saudi Women's Premier League
- Women's football in Saudi Arabia
