= Mubarkh Al-Saiari =

Saudi Arabian footballer (born 1998)

Personal information
- Full name: Mubarkh Mohammed Al-Saiari
- Date of birth: 19 December 1998 (age 27)
- Place of birth: Saudi Arabia
- Height: 1.56 m (5 ft 1 in)
- Position: Forward

Team information
- Current team: Al-Nassr
- Number: 10

Senior career*
Years	Team	Apps	(Gls)
2018–2020	United Eagles		
2020–2022	Eastern Flames	+3	(+7)
2022–	Al-Nassr	28	(8)

International career^{‡}
2021–	Saudi Arabia Futsal	11	(0)
2022–	Saudi Arabia	10	(0)
Medal record
Women's futsal
Representing Saudi Arabia
WAFF Women's Futsal Championship
Runner-up	2022 Saudi Arabia
Women's football
Representing Saudi Arabia
SAFF Women's International Friendly Tournament
Winner	2023 Khobar
- * Club domestic league appearances and goals as of 30 December 2023 ‡ National team caps and goals as of 12 January 2024

Mubarkh Mohammed Al-Saiari (Arabic: مباركة محمد الصيعري; born 19 December 1998) is a Saudi professional footballer who plays as a forward for Women's Premier League club Al-Nassr and the Saudi Arabia national team.

== Early life ==
At eight, Al-Sairi began playing football, but it wasn't easy for her due to cultural norms and societal views in Saudi Arabia. People didn't accept the idea of girls playing sports back then. Thankfully, things have improved over time.

== Club career ==
Al-Saiari started her futsal career with United Eagles in 2018. before joining Eastern Flames in 2021 where she played football and futsal. Additionally, she also played for the King Faisal University football team.

=== Al-Nassr ===
Mubarkh scored a hat-trick in Al Nassr's inaugural match, securing an outstanding 18–0 victory. She became the first player to score a hat-trick in the 2022–23 season and the competition as a whole. Her outstanding performance continued all season, leading to her being named the best player of the season.

== International career ==
=== Futsal ===
In September 2021, Mubarkh earned her first call-up to the futsal national team for the training camp in Croatia.

=== Football ===
Al-Sairi was first called up to the senior team in August 2022 for a training camp in Austria. On 19 January 2023 she debuted for the team in a 1–1 draw against Pakistan.

== Career statistics ==
=== Club ===
As of match played 26 August 2024

Appearances and goals by club, season and competition
Club	Season	League			Cup		Continental		Other		Total	
Club	Season	Division	Apps	Goals	Apps	Goals	Apps	Goals	Apps	Goals	Apps	Goals
Al Nassr	2022–23	SWPL	14	7	–	–	—		—		14	7
Al Nassr	2023–24	SWPL	14	2	2	0	—		5	0	16	2
Al Nassr	2024–25	SWPL	0	0	0	0	1	1	2	1	3	2
Al Nassr	Total		28	9	2	0	1	1	7	1	33	11
Career total			28	9	2	0	1	1	7	1	33	11

=== International ===
Statistics accurate as of match played 8 January 2024.

Year	Saudi Arabia		Saudi Arabia Futsal	
Year	Apps	Goals	Apps	Goals
2022	0	0	11	0
2023	8	0	–	–
2024	1	0	–	–
Total	9	0	11	0

Scores and results list Saudi Arabia's goal tally first, score column indicates score after each Al-Saiari goal.

List of international goals scored by Al Bandari Mobarak
No.	Date	Venue	Opponent	Score	Result	Competition
1	13 June 2026	Windmill Football Club Stadium, Bangkok, Thailand	Laos	4–1	5–1	Friendly
2	9 October 2026	QWSC Stadium, Doha, Qatar	Malaysia	2–0	2–0	Friendly

== Personal life ==
She attended King Faisal University, majoring in Physics.

== Honours ==
Eastern Flames

- SAFF Women's Regional League (Eastern region): 2020–21, 2021–22

Al Nassr

- Saudi Women's Premier League: 2022–23, 2023–24
- SAFF Women's National Football Championship: 2021–22
- Saudi–Jordanian Women's Clubs Championship third place: 2023

Saudi Arabia

- SAFF Women's International Friendly Tournament Winner: Khobar 2023

Individual

- Saudi Women's Premier League Best Player : 2022–23
