= Abdulaziz Al-Alwni =

Saudi football coach

Abdulaziz al-Alwni
Personal information
- Full name: Abdulaziz Aaish Al-Alwni
- Date of birth: 17 March 1989 (age 37)
- Place of birth: Saudi Arabia
- Height: 1.70 m (5 ft 7 in)

Senior career*
Years	Team	Apps	(Gls)
2012–2015	Al-Muharraq		
–2022	Al-Ettifaq		

International career
2020–	Saudi Arabia Futsal		

Managerial career
- –2022: Al-Mamlaka
- 2022–: Al-Nassr
- * Club domestic league appearances and goals

Abdulaziz al-Alwni (Arabic: عبدالعزيز عايش العلوني; born 17 March 1989) is a Saudi football coach and former futsal player who is currently the head coach of Saudi Women's Premier League side Al-Nassr.

== Managerial career ==
=== Al Nassr (2022–present) ===
After Al Nassr acquired Al-Mamlaka, Al-Alwni was kept on as head coach of the women's team, leading them to triumph in the inaugural 2022–23 season, becoming the first coach to win the title. In the following season, he guided the team to another league title, securing back-to-back titles and earning qualification for the inaugural AFC Women's Champions League preliminary stage.

== International career ==
In June 2022, Al-Alwni was named to the Saudi Arabia squad for the 2022 Arab Futsal Cup. In September 2022, He was selected for the Saudi team for the 2022 AFC Futsal Asian Cup in Kuwait.

== Honours ==
=== Manager ===
Al-Mamlaka

- SAFF Women's National Football Championship
  - Winners (1; record) 2021–22

Al-Nassr

- Saudi Women's Premier League
  - Winners (2; record) 2022–23, 2023–24
- Jordanian-Saudi Women's Clubs Championship
  - Third place 2023
