= Léa Le Garrec =

French footballer (born 1993)

Personal information
- Full name: Léa Aliette Jeanine Le Garrec
- Date of birth: 9 July 1993 (age 33)
- Place of birth: Dreux, France
- Height: 1.65 m (5 ft 5 in)
- Position: Midfielder

Team information
- Current team: Al Qadsiah
- Number: 10

Youth career
- 1999–2006: Avrais Nonancourt
- 2006–2008: Évreux

Senior career*
Years	Team	Apps	(Gls)
2008–2009	Évreux	18	(5)
2009–2010	Montigny-le-Bretonneux	21	(3)
2010–2012	Paris Saint-Germain	27	(0)
2012–2014	Guingamp	30	(7)
2014–2016	Saint-Malo	48	(33)
2016–2019	Guingamp	51	(6)
2019–2020	Brighton & Hove Albion	15	(1)
2020–2024	Fleury	77	(19)
2024–	Al Qadsiah	16	(6)

International career^{‡}
2007	France U16	2	(0)
2008–2009	France U17	13	(4)
2010–2012	France U19	29	(6)
2016–2018	France B	12	(1)
2017–	France	15	(2)
Medal record
Women's football
Representing France
UEFA Women's Nations League
Runner-up	2024
UEFA Women's Under-19 Championship
Winner	2010 Macedonia
UEFA Women's Under-17 Championship
Third place	2009 Switzerland
- * Club domestic league appearances and goals as of 14 March 2025 ‡ National team caps and goals as of 16 July 2024

Léa Aliette Jeanine Le Garrec (born 9 July 1993) is a French professional footballer who plays as a midfielder for Saudi Women's Premier League club Al Qadsiah and the France national team.

== Career ==
She joined Paris Saint-Germain for the 2010–11 Division 1 Féminine season.

On 8 August 2019, Le Garrec was announced at Brighton on a one-year contract. She made her league debut against Bristol City on 7 September 2019. Le Garrec scored her first league goal, a 25-yard strike, against Birmingham City on 17 November 2019, scoring in the 44th minute. At the end of the season, she turned down a new deal and left the club.

On 2 July 2020, Le Garrec was announced at Fleury.

During her time at Fleury, she was part of the UNFP Division 1 Féminine 2022–23 team of the year.

On 10 September 2024, Le Garrec signed for the Saudi Women's Premier League's side, Al Qadsiah.

== International career ==
Le Garrec is a former France youth international and was part of the under-19 team that won the 2010 UEFA Women's Under-19 Championship. Le Garrec scored two goals in the competition.

Le Garrec made her international debut against Chile on 15 September 2017.

She was recalled to the France squad in March 2023 for friendly matches against Colombia and Canada in April. On 11 April 2023, she scored her first international goal, in the 64th minute of the match against Canada.

Le Garrec was part of the 26-player preliminary France squad announced for the 2023 FIFA Women's World Cup on 6 June 2023. She was part of the final 23-player squad announced on 4 July 2023. During the competition, she scored her second international goal, on 2 August 2023, scoring against Panama in the 45th+5th minute.

Le Garrec was part of the France squad at the 2024 Summer Olympics as an alternative player.

== Consulting career ==
Le Garrec works as a consultant for Canal+.

== Career statistics ==
=== International ===
As of match played 16 July 2024

Appearances and goals by national team and year
National team	Year	Apps	Goals
France	2017	4	0
France	2023	8	2
France	2024	3	0
Total		15	2

Scores and results list France's goal tally first, score column indicates score after each Le Garrec goal.

List of international goals scored by Léa Le Garrec
No.	Date	Venue	Opponent	Score	Result	Competition
1	11 April 2023	MMArena, Le Mans, France	Canada	2–0	2–1	Friendly
2	2 August 2023	Sydney Football Stadium, Sydney, Australia	Panama	4–1	6–3	2023 FIFA Women's World Cup

== Honours ==
France

- UEFA Women's Nations League runner-up: 2023–24

Individual

- UNFP Première Ligue team of the year: 2022–23
- LFFP Première Ligue team of the season: 2022–23
