= Kathellen =

Brazilian footballer (born 1996)

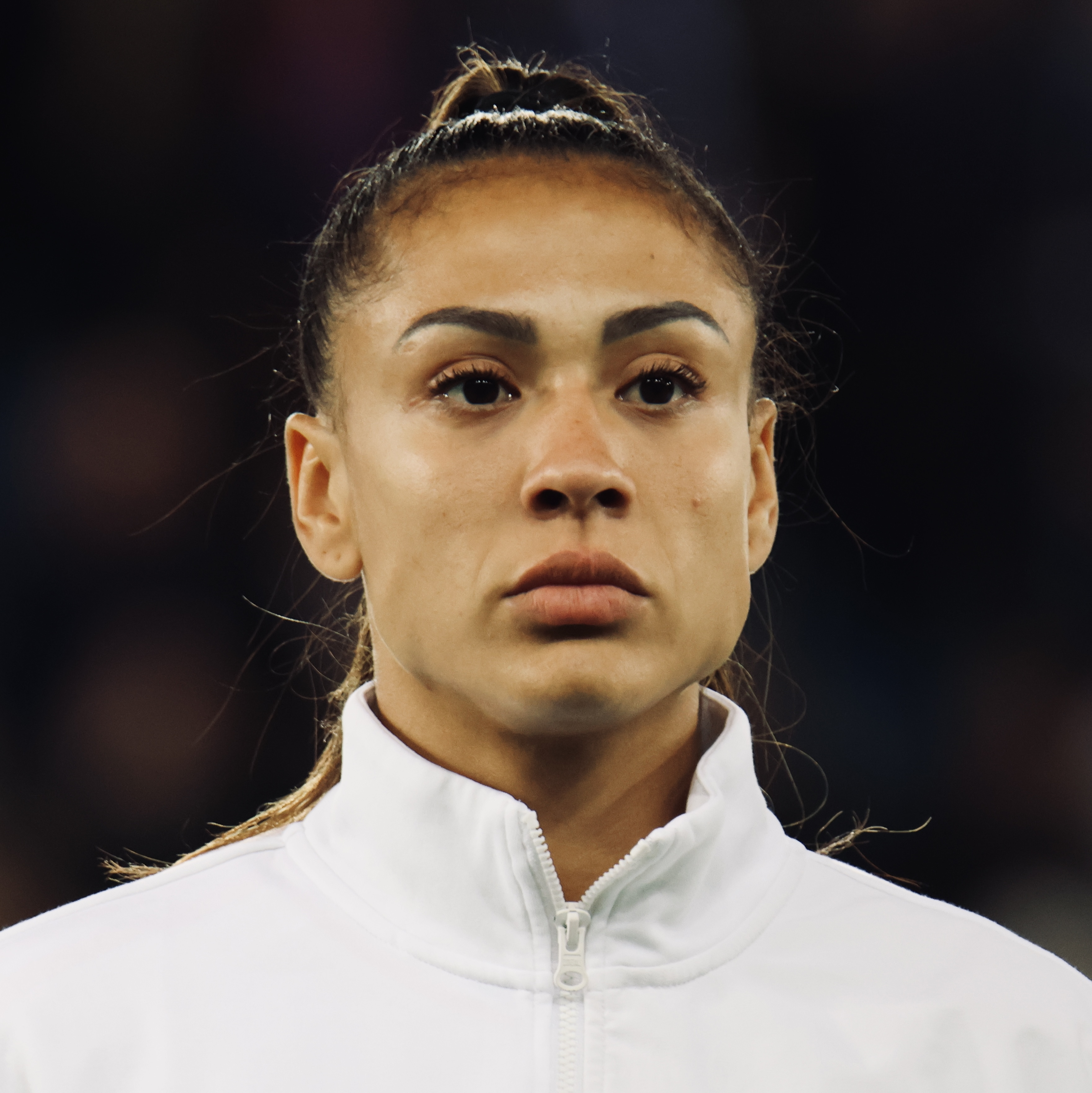
- Kathellen with Real Madrid in 2023

Personal information
- Full name: Kathellen Sousa Feitoza
- Date of birth: 26 April 1996 (age 30)
- Place of birth: São Vicente, São Paulo, Brazil
- Height: 1.81 m (5 ft 11 in)
- Position: Centre back

Team information
- Current team: Al Hilal

College career
| Years | Team | Apps | (Gls) |
| 2014–2015 | Monroe College | 15 | (2) |
| 2016 | Louisville Cardinals | 18 | (0) |
| 2017 | UCF Knights | 18 | (0) |

Senior career*
| Years | Team | Apps | (Gls) |
| 2018–2020 | Bordeaux | 33 | (3) |
| 2020–2022 | Internazionale | 11 | (0) |
| 2022–2024 | Real Madrid | 44 | (2) |
| 2024–2026 | Al-Nassr | 32 | (4) |
| 2026– | Al Hilal | 0 | (0) |

International career
| 2018– | Brazil | 30 | (1) |
- * Club domestic league appearances and goals as of 24 April 2026

Kathellen Sousa Feitoza (born 26 April 1996), commonly known as Kathellen, is a Brazilian professional footballer who plays as a centre back for and captains Saudi Women's Premier League club Al Hilal and the Brazil national team. She is a product of the American college soccer system.

== Club career ==
As a young girl Kathellen loved football but mainly had to play futsal. She found opportunities for field soccer limited in her native Baixada Santista, especially after Santos FC's women's section was closed in 2012.

Kathellen applied for an athletic scholarship to the United States and was selected by Monroe College of the National Junior College Athletic Association. After two successful years with Monroe College she spent her two remaining years of college eligibility with Louisville Cardinals and UCF Knights, respectively, in NCAA Division I.

She subsequently received an offer from FC Girondins de Bordeaux and joined the French Division 1 Féminine club halfway through their 2017–18 season. In May 2018 she signed a two-year extension to her contract.

After a successful 2019 FIFA Women's World Cup with Brazil, and an elite level performance against France, Kathellen was linked to many major European clubs, including newly promoted CD Tacón, due to become Real Madrid for season 2020–21. Instead she remained with Bordeaux for a further season, then joined Italian Serie A club Inter Milan in August 2020.

In 2024, she left Real Madrid and joined Al-Nassr on a two-year contract, with her official debut coming on 25 of August in a 3–0 victory over Myawady in the AFC Women's Champions League, which she helped her team keep a clean sheet.

On 21 July 2026, she signed a two-year contract with Al Hilal.

== International career ==
Brazil women's national football team head coach Vadão called Kathellen up for the first time in June 2018, for a training camp ahead of the 2018 Tournament of Nations. As the tournament fell outside the FIFA International Match Calendar, some regular national team players were not released by their clubs, causing Vadão to consider other players.

On 26 July 2018, she earned her first cap for the senior Brazil women's national team at the 2018 Tournament of Nations, appearing as a substitute for Daiane Limeira in a 3–1 defeat by Australia.

A year later, Kathellen was subsequently called up by Brazil for the 2019 FIFA Women's World Cup. She started the preparation camp as the main backup for the experienced pair of centre backs Mônica and Érika. After Érika was forced out of the competition by injury, Kathellen was made a regular starter. Despite being the youngest Brazilian player in the lineup for the Round of 16 game thriller against France, Kathellen delivered a major performance.

== Personal life ==
In February 2026, Kathellen announced her conversion to Islam. Few days after announcing that she has embraced Islam, Kathellen travelled to Mecca to perform Umrah.

== Career statistics ==
=== International ===
As of match played 2 August 2023

Appearances and goals by national team and year
| National team | Year | Apps | Goals |
|---|---|---|---|
| Brazil | 2018 | 3 | 0 |
| Brazil | 2019 | 10 | 0 |
| Brazil | 2020 | 0 | 0 |
| Brazil | 2021 | 1 | 0 |
| Brazil | 2022 | 11 | 1 |
| Brazil | 2023 | 5 | 0 |
| Total | | 30 | 1 |

Scores and results list Brazil's goal tally first, score column indicates score after each Kathellen goal.

List of international goals scored by Kathellen
| No. | Date | Venue | Opponent | Score | Result | Competition |
|---|---|---|---|---|---|---|
| 1 | 5 September 2022 | Moses Mabhida Stadium, Durban, South Africa | South Africa | 6–0 | 6–0 | Friendly |
