= Duda Francelino =

Brazilian footballer (born 1995)

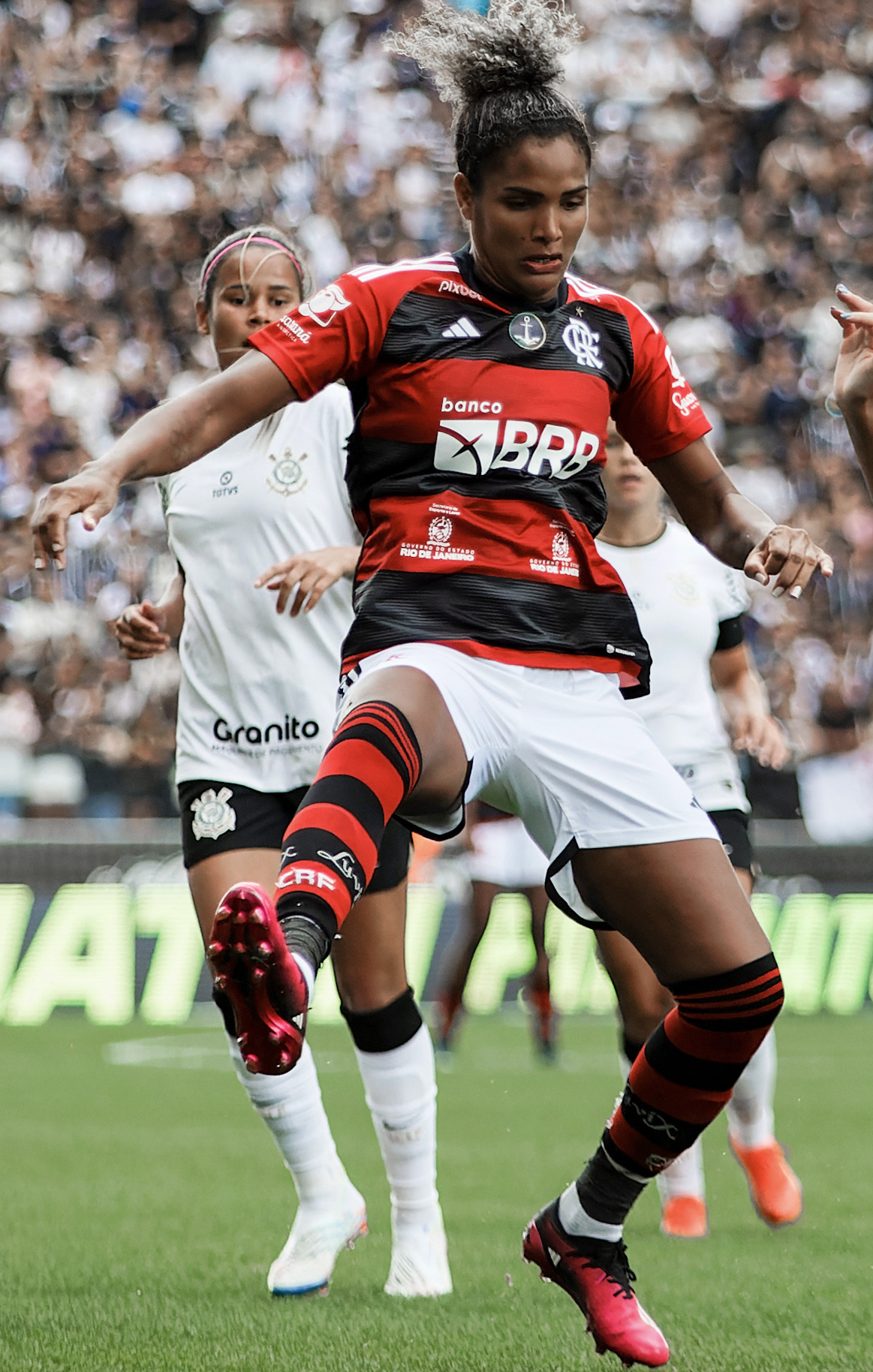
- Duda Francelino in 2023

Personal information
- Full name: Maria Eduarda Francelino da Silva
- Date of birth: 18 July 1995 (age 31)
- Place of birth: Pernambuco, Brazil
- Position: Forward

Team information
- Current team: Al-Nassr
- Number: 20

Senior career*
Years	Team	Apps	(Gls)
2013	Vitória das Tabocas	7	(6)
2014	São Francisco	4	(1)
2015	Centro Olímpico	2	(0)
2016	Corinthians	1	(0)
2017	3B da Amazônia		
2018–2019	Avaldsnes	33	(5)
2020–2021	São Paulo	33	(14)
2022–2024	Flamengo	16	(6)
2024–	Al-Nassr	7	(2)

International career^{‡}
2014	Brazil U20	2	(0)
2019–	Brazil	27	(3)
- * Club domestic league appearances and goals as of 13 Dec 2024 ‡ National team caps and goals as of 7 April 2023 (UTC)

Maria Eduarda Francelino da Silva (born 18 July 1995), known as Duda, is a Brazilian professional footballer who plays as a forward for Saudi Women's Premier League club Al-Nassr and the Brazil women's national team. She also played 2 games for the Brazil U20 team in 2014.

== International goals ==
Goal	Date	Location	Opponent	Score	Result	Competition
1	2019-12-12	São Paulo, Brazil	Mexico	1–0	6–0	Friendly game
2	2022-07-21	Cali, Colombia	Peru	1–0	6–0	Copa América 2022
3	2019-12-12	Durban, South Africa	South Africa	4–0	6–0	Friendly game
