= Lina Boussaha =

Footballer (born 1999)

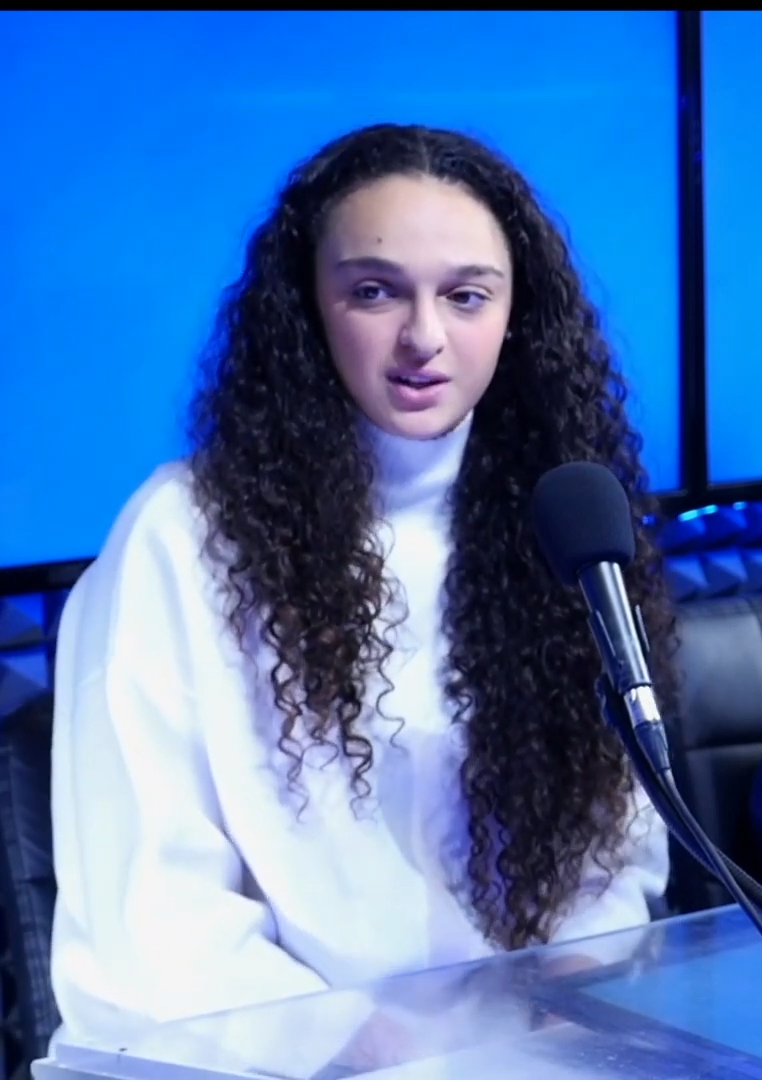
- Boussaha in 2020

Personal information
- Date of birth: 16 January 1999 (age 27)
- Place of birth: Saint-Denis, France
- Height: 1.65 m (5 ft 5 in)
- Position: Midfielder

Team information
- Current team: Al-Ittihad
- Number: 93

Youth career
- 2009–2013: Saint-Denis RC
- 2013–2016: Paris Saint-Germain

Senior career*
Years	Team	Apps	(Gls)
2016–2020	Paris Saint-Germain	4	(0)
2018–2019	→ Lille (loan)	20	(2)
2020–2021	Le Havre	2	(1)
2023–2025	Al-Nassr	30	(25)
2025–	Al-Ittihad	14	(7)

International career^{‡}
2015	France U16	5	(2)
2015–2016	France U17	10	(5)
2017–2018	France U19	10	(6)
2017–2018	France U20	3	(1)
2023–	Algeria	29	(6)
Medal record
Women's football
Representing Algeria
Women's Africa Cup of Nations
Third place	2026 Morocco
Representing France
UEFA Women's Under-19 Championship
Runner-up	2017 Northern Ireland
- * Club domestic league appearances and goals as of 23 April 2026 ‡ National team caps and goals as of 13 October 2026

Lina Boussaha (born 16 January 1999) is a professional footballer who plays as a midfielder for Saudi Women's Premier League club Al-Ittihad. Born in France, she plays for the Algeria national team.

== Club career ==
A youth academy graduate of Paris Saint-Germain, Boussaha made her professional debut for the club on 9 October 2016 in a 3–0 league win against Metz.

On 10 July 2018, Boussaha joined Lille on a season long loan deal. She scored her first senior career goal on 30 September 2018 in a 1–1 draw against her parent club PSG. She also scored goals in the quarter-final and semi-final of Coupe de France féminine, which helped the club to reach their first ever cup final.

On 19 December 2022, Saudi club Al Nassr announced the signing of Boussaha. She scored two goals from four matches during 2022–23 season and helped her team to become the first ever Saudi Women's Premier League champions.

== International career ==
Boussaha has represented France at youth international level. She was part of the France under-19 team which reached the final of the 2017 UEFA Women's Under-19 Championship.

On 15 September 2023, Boussaha received her first call-up to the Algeria national team for 2024 Women's Africa Cup of Nations qualification matches. On 20 September, she made her debut in a 2–1 win against Uganda. In June 2025, she was named in the squad for the 2024 Women's Africa Cup of Nations.

== Personal life ==
Boussaha is of Algerian descent.

== Career statistics ==
=== Club ===
As of match played 8 November 2025

Appearances and goals by club, season and competition
Club	Season	League			National cup (Note: Includes Coupe de France Féminine, Saudi Women's Cup)		Continental		Other		Total	
Club	Season	Division	Apps	Goals	Apps	Goals	Apps	Goals	Apps	Goals	Apps	Goals
Paris Saint-Germain	2016–17	D1F	3	0	1	0	0	0	—		4	0
Paris Saint-Germain	2017–18	D1F	0	0	2	0	—		—		2	0
Paris Saint-Germain	2018–19	D1F	0	0	0	0	0	0	—		0	0
Paris Saint-Germain	2019–20	D1F	1	0	3	4	3 (Note: Appearances in UEFA Women's Champions League)	0	0	0	7	4
Paris Saint-Germain	Total		4	0	6	4	3	0	0	0	13	4
Lille (loan)	2018–19	D1F	20	2	5	2	—		—		25	4
Le Havre	2020–21	D1F	2	1	0	0	—		—		2	1
Al-Nassr	2022–23	SWPL	4	2	—		—		—		4	2
Al-Nassr	2023–24	SWPL	14	12	2	2	—		—		16	14
Al-Nassr	2024–25	SWPL	12	11	2	3	3 (Note: Appearances in AFC Women's Champions League)	1	—		17	15
Al-Nassr	Total		30	25	4	5	3	1	0	0	37	31
Al-Ittihad	2025–26	SWPL	5	5	1	1	—		—		6	6
Career total			61	33	16	12	6	1	0	0	83	46

=== International ===
As of match played 13 October 2026

Appearances and goals by national team and year
National team	Year	Apps	Goals
Algeria	2023	4	1
Algeria	2024	8	1
Algeria	2025	6	1
Algeria	2026	11	3
Total		29	6

Scores and results list Algeria's goal tally first, score column indicates score after each Boussaha goal.

List of international goals scored by Lina Boussaha
No.	Date	Venue	Opponent	Score	Result	Competition
1	30 November 2023	Stade du 5 Juillet, Algiers, Algeria	Burundi	3–1	5–1	2024 Women's Africa Cup of Nations qualification
2	27 February 2024	Nelson Mandela Stadium, Algiers, Algeria	Burkina Faso	1–0	3–0	Friendly
3	29 June 2025	Mustapha Tchaker Stadium, Blida, Algeria	DR Congo	1–0	1–0	Friendly
4	28 February 2026	EFA Center, Cairo, Egypt	Egypt	1–0	3–0	Friendly
5	15 August 2026	Rabat Olympic Stadium, Rabat, Morocco	Morocco	1–1	1–1 (3–2 p)	2026 Women's Africa Cup of Nations
6	9 October 2026	Stade du 5 Juillet, Algiers, Algeria	Central African Republic	3–0	8–0	2028 CAF Women's Olympic qualifying tournament

== Honours ==
Paris Saint-Germain

- Coupe de France: 2017–18

Al-Nassr

- Saudi Women's Premier League: 2022–23, 2023–24, 2024–25

France U19

- UEFA Women's Under-19 Championship runner-up: 2017

Individual

- Saudi Women's Premier League Player of the Season: 2023–24
- Saudi Women's Premier League Team of the Season: 2023–24
