= Neom SC (women) =

Women's football club in Saudi Arabia

Neom S.C.
- Full name: Neom Women's Sports Club
- Founded: 2019; 7 years ago as White Lion: June 2023; 2 years ago – renamed to Western Hawks; September 2023; 2 years ago – renamed to Al-Suqoor following acquisition by Al-Suqoor; December 2023; 2 years ago – renamed to Neom following acquisition by Neom
- Ground: King Khalid Sports City Stadium, Tabuk Province (Planned: NEOM Stadium)
- Capacity: 12,000
- Owner: Neom Company
- League: Saudi Women's Premier League
- 2024–25: SW1DL, 1st of 9 (Champions)
| Home colours | Away colours |

Neom Women's Sports Club (stylized as NEOM S.C.; Arabic: سيدات نيوم), commonly known as Neom Ladies, is a Saudi Arabian professional women's football club based in the Tabuk Province of Saudi Arabia. It is the women's section of Neom Sports Club and competes in the Saudi Women's Premier League, the top tier of the women's football league system in Saudi Arabia.

== History ==
=== The White Lion (2019–2023) ===
Established in 2019 as the White Lion Club (Arabic: نادي الليث الأبيض), a women's football team in Jeddah, the club participated in the inaugural Jeddah Women's League in 2019 and competed in the Women's Community Football League the following year.

In 2022, the club joined the newly established Saudi Women's First Division League, the second tier of Saudi football, organized by the Saudi Arabian Football Federation. Placed in Group Two, the team finished in second place, qualifying for the playoffs. They defeated Sahm 2–0 to advance to the quarterfinals, where they were eliminated after a 5–0 loss to Jeddah Pride.

=== Al-Suqoor and NEOM (2023–present) ===
In mid–2023, the team was renamed the Western Hawks (Arabic: الصقور الغربية). They were acquired by Al-Suqoor Club in September 2023. Competing in the First Division League under their new name, the team was placed in the west group, where they finished second, qualifying for the final stages and ensuring they avoided relegation.

The club took part in the inaugural Saudi Women's Cup and was drawn against Al-Hilal in the round of 16. They were defeated 4–0, exiting the competition in its early stages.

On 24 December 2023, the club was renamed Neom Sports Club following the rebranding of its namesake. Drawn into Group C of the final stage, the team suffered a heavy loss to Al-Amal and a draw against Jeddah, ultimately failing to secure promotion.

On 25 April 2025, Neom Women won their first-ever title by claiming the Saudi Women's First Division League, earning promotion to the Premier League.

== Honours ==
- Saudi Women's First Division League (tier 2)
  - Winners (1): 2024–25

== Players and staff ==
=== Current squad ===
As of 26 September 2024

Note: Flags indicate national team as defined under FIFA eligibility rules; some limited exceptions apply. Players may hold more than one non-FIFA nationality.

| No. | Pos. | Nation | Player |
|---|---|---|---|
| 33 | GK | KSA | Haifa Fahad |
| 89 | GK | KSA | Wasaif Al-Osimi |
| 1 | GK | KSA | Zara Al-Saif |
| 42 | DF | KSA | Nojoud Al-Mawlid |
| 4 | DF | TUN | Chaima Abbassi |
| 5 | DF | KSA | Oum Kalthom Al-Aidroos |
| 55 | DF | KSA | Atheer Al-Juwayr |
| 2 | DF | KSA | Dina Jouhari |
| 30 | DF | KSA | Sara Al-Fagham |
| 3 | DF | KSA | Nahla Abdualjbar |
| 77 | MF | KSA | Rawan Hazazi |

| No. | Pos. | Nation | Player |
|---|---|---|---|
| 18 | MF | KSA | Maram Al-Tawairqi |
| 6 | MF | KSA | Azza Gouda |
| 14 | MF | KSA | Rema Al-Thakafi |
| 15 | MF | KSA | Sahar Mohammed |
| 11 | DF | KSA | Shomokh Al-Hawsawi |
| 7 | MF | COL | Diana Celis |
| 23 | MF | KSA | Maha Al-Sharif |
| 10 | MF | BRA | Priscilla Hellen |
| 9 | FW | JOR | Maysa Jbarah (captain) |
| 99 | FW | KSA | Amal Al-Omari |

== Personnel ==
=== Club officials ===
| Position | Name | Nationality |
Coaching staff
| Head coach | Lassaad Hanini | (Tunisia) |
| Assistant coach | Houssam Hafed; Wali Hakamy; Ala'a Abu Kasheh; Amena Al-Darbi | (Tunisia) (Saudi Arabia) (Jordan) (Saudi Arabia) |
| Goalkeepers coach | Abdessamad Ousmane | (Niger) |
| Fitness coach | Maram Ziad Alabbassi | (Saudi Arabia) |
| Match analyst | Hibah Albalawi | (Saudi Arabia) |
Management
| Chairman | Meshari Al-Motairi | (Saudi Arabia) |
| CEO | Moaath Alohali | (Saudi Arabia) |

== See also ==
- List of football clubs in Saudi Arabia
