= Andreia Faria =

Portuguese footballer

Personal information
- Full name: Andreia Martins Faria
- Date of birth: 19 April 2000 (age 26)
- Place of birth: Constantim, Vila Real, Portugal
- Position: Midfielder

Team information
- Current team: Al-Nassr
- Number: 80

Youth career
- 2009–2015: Diogo Cão (boys team)
- 2015–2017: Abambres (boys team)
- 2018–2019: Benfica

Senior career*
Years	Team	Apps	(Gls)
2017–2018	Vilaverdense	15	(2)
2018–2025	Benfica	132	(20)
2025–	Al-Nassr	0	(0)

International career^{‡}
2015–2016	Portugal U16	8	(1)
2016–2017	Portugal U17	15	(4)
2016–2019	Portugal U19	30	(3)
2019–	Portugal	37	(3)
- * Club domestic league appearances and goals as of 16 June 2025 ‡ National team caps and goals as of 2 December 2025

Andreia Martins Faria (born 19 April 2000) is a Portuguese footballer who plays for Saudi Women's Premier League club Al-Nassr and Portugal as a midfielder.

== International career ==
On 24 June 2025, Faria was called up to the Portugal squad for the UEFA Women's Euro 2025.

=== International goals ===
No.	Date	Venue	Opponent	Score	Result	Competition
1.	6 September 2022	Estádio do FC Vizela, Vizela, Portugal	Turkey	4–0	4–0	2023 FIFA Women's World Cup qualification
2.	27 February 2024	Estádio António Coimbra da Mota, Estoril, Portugal	South Korea	3–0	5–1	Friendly
3.	28 November 2025	Estadio Municipal de Braga, Braga, Portugal	Netherlands	1–2	1–2	Friendly

== Honours ==
Benfica

- Campeonato Nacional Feminino: 2020–21, 2021–22, 2022–23, 2023–24, 2024–25
- Campeonato Nacional II Divisão Feminino: 2018–19
- Taça de Portugal: 2018–19, 2023–24
- Taça da Liga: 2019–20, 2020–21, 2022–23, 2023–24, 2024–25
- Supertaça de Portugal: 2019, 2022, 2023
