= Nesrine Bahlouli =

French footballer (born 2003)

Personal information
- Full name: Nesrine Jamila Aicha Bahlouli
- Date of birth: 20 February 2003 (age 23)
- Place of birth: Lyon, France
- Height: 1.66 m (5 ft 5 in)
- Position: Midfielder

Team information
- Current team: Al-Nassr
- Number: 69

Youth career
- 2012–2013: CS Lyon 8
- 2013–2022: Lyon

Senior career*
Years	Team	Apps	(Gls)
2022–2023	Lyon	2	(0)
2023–2024	AC Milan	3	(0)
2023–2024	→ Bordeaux (loan)	17	(1)
2024–	Al-Nassr	18	(2)

International career^{‡}
2019	France U16	5	(0)
2019	France U17	1	(0)
2021–2022	France U19	7	(1)
2023	France U23	4	(0)
2026–	Algeria	0	(0)
- * Club domestic league appearances and goals as of 23 April 2025 ‡ National team caps and goals as of 30 November 2023

Nesrine Jamila Aicha Bahlouli (born 20 February 2003) is a French-Algerian professional footballer who plays as a midfielder for Saudi Women's Premier League club Al-Nassr. Born in France, she represented her country of birth at youth level before opting to represent Algeria at senior level.

== Club career ==
=== Lyon ===
During her time at Lyon, she was considered an up-and-coming star. She made her league debut against Fleury 91 on 30 October 2022.

=== AC Milan ===
On 20 January 2023, Bahlouli was announced at AC Milan. She made her league debut against Juventus on 18 March 2023. In September 2024, she agreed with AC Milan to part ways with the club by mutually terminating the contract.

=== Loan to Bordeaux ===
On 24 August 2023, it was announced that Bahlouli had joined Bordeaux on loan. She made her league debut against PSG on 17 September 2023. Bahlouli scored her first league goal against Lille on 24 April 2024, scoring in the 12th minute.

=== Al-Nassr ===
On 27 September 2024, Saudi club Al-Nassr announced the signing with Bahlouli.

== International career ==
On 26 November 2021, Bahlouli made her U19 debut against Belgium U19s on 26 November 2021. She scored her first goal against Spain U19s on 3 June 2022, scoring in the 30th minute.

== Personal life ==
Bahlouli is part of the Bahlouli football family; her older brothers are Farès Bahlouli and Mohamed Bahlouli.
