= 2025 Saudi Women's Super Cup =

كأس السوبر السعودي للسيدات

Tournament details
- Host country: Saudi Arabia
- City: Riyadh
- Dates: 4–8 September
- Teams: 4

Final positions
- Champions: Al-Nassr (1st title)
- Runners-up: Al-Ahli

Tournament statistics
- Matches played: 3
- Goals scored: 9 (3 per match)
- Top scorer(s): Ibtissam Jraïdi (AHL); Ruth Kipoyi (NSR) (2 goals each)
- Best player: Kathellen (NSR)
- Best goalkeeper: Mona Abdulrahman (NSR)

The 2025 Saudi Women's Super Cup was the inaugural edition of the Saudi Women's Super Cup, an annual women's football competition contested by clubs from the Saudi Arabian football league system that achieved success in the major competitions of the preceding season.

== Qualification ==
According to the competition format, the champions and runners-up of the 2024–25 Saudi Women's Premier League and the 2024–25 Saudi Women's Cup qualify for the tournament. As Al-Ahli qualified by winning the cup and finishing as league runners-up, the vacant place was awarded to the next highest-ranked team in the Premier League standings not already qualified, which was fourth-placed Al-Shabab.

=== Qualified teams ===
The following four teams qualified for the tournament.

Team	Qualification	
Team	Method	Date
Al-Qadsiah	2024–25 Saudi Cup Runners-up	14 February 2025
Al-Ahli	2024–25 Saudi Cup Champions	15 February 2025
Al-Nassr	2024–25 Saudi Premier League Champions	14 March 2025
~~Al-Shabab~~	2024–25 Saudi Premier League highest-placed non-qualified team	25 April 2025
Al-Ula	2024–25 Saudi Premier League highest-placed non-qualified team	4 August 2025

Withdrawal of Al-Shabab

On 4 August 2025, the Saudi Arabian Football Federation announced that Al-Shabab would be replaced by fifth-placed Al-Ula. As the draw and schedule had already been released, Al-Shabab were fined SAR 125,000, ordered to forfeit any financial allocations from the competition, and banned from participating in the following season. By mid-August, it was reported that Al-Shabab had disbanded their women's section entirely.

== Draw ==
The competition draw was held on 14 May 2025 at the headquarters of the Saudi Arabian Football Federation in Riyadh. The draw was conducted without seeding, using two pots: one containing the names of the four teams and the other containing numbered balls from 1 to 4. A team name was drawn first, followed by a number, with the team placed in the corresponding position in the bracket.

== Bracket ==
Semi-finals
4 September 2025
Al-Qadsiah	0
Al-Nassr	3
5 September 2025
Al-Ula	0
Al-Ahli	4

Final
8 September 2025
Al-Nassr	2
Al-Ahli	0

== Matches ==
All Matches took place in the capital Riyadh. All times listed are local (SAST, UTC+03:00).

=== Al-Qadsiah vs Al-Nassr ===
4 September 2025
20:00

Al-Qadsiah	0–3	Al-Nassr
	Report	Kipoyi 22', 49'; Al-Hwsawi 67'

Al-Shabab Club Stadium, Riyadh
Referee: Ali Al-Qahtani

Al-Qadsiah	Al-Nassr

GK	72	(Saudi Arabia) Sara Khalid	(yellow card) 90+3'
DF	94	(Brazil) Rayanne Machado (C)
DF	23	(Saudi Arabia) Raghad Mukhayzin
DF	99	(Saudi Arabia) Rana Hassan	(yellow card) 21'	(substituted off) 85'
MF	66	(Germany) Dzsenifer Marozsán
FW	77	(Saudi Arabia) Noura Ibrahim		(substituted off) 75'
MF	10	(France) Léa Le Garrec
MF	11	(Saudi Arabia) Yara Al-Faris		(substituted off) 61'
FW	16	(Brazil) Adriana		(substituted off) 61'
MF	14	(Saudi Arabia) Maram Al-Yahya	(yellow card) 34'
MF	7	(Iceland) Sara Björk Gunnarsdóttir
Substitutes:
FW	3	(Cameroon) Ajara Nchout		(substituted on) 61'
DF	2	(Saudi Arabia) Dalal Abdullatif		(substituted on) 61'
DF	12	(Saudi Arabia) Munirah Al-Ghanam		(substituted on) 75'
FW	17	(Saudi Arabia) Haya Al-Sunaidi		(substituted on) 85'
Manager:
(Canada) Carmelina Moscato

GK	21	(Saudi Arabia) Mona Abdulrahman
DF	22	(Saudi Arabia) Shuruq Al-Hwsawi		(substituted off) 90+2'
DF	14	(Brazil) Kathellen
DF	6	(Saudi Arabia) Aseel Ahmed	(yellow card) 28'
MF	8	(Saudi Arabia) Sara Al-Hamad		(substituted off) 80'
MF	69	(France) Nesrine Bahlouli		(substituted off) 61'
MF	20	(Brazil) Duda Francelino (C)
MF	7	(Saudi Arabia) Basmah Al-Shnaifi
FW	11	(Democratic Republic of the Congo) Ruth Kipoyi
FW	10	(Saudi Arabia) Mubarkh Al-Saiari		(substituted off) 61'
FW	9	(Tanzania) Clara Luvanga
Substitutes:
MF	80	(Portugal) Andreia Faria		(substituted on) 61'
MF	5	(Saudi Arabia) Layan Yousef		(substituted on) 61'
MF	44	(Saudi Arabia) Wejdan Mohammed		(substituted on) 80'
DF	4	(Saudi Arabia) Latifah Nawfawi		(substituted on) 90+2'
Manager:
(Indonesia) Rudy Eka Priyambada

=== Al-Ula vs Al-Ahli ===
5 September 2025
20:00

Al-Ula	0–4	Al-Ahli
	Report	Khaled 3'; Kaba-Kaba 41'; Jraïdi 45+4', 82'

Al-Shabab Club Stadium, Riyadh
Referee: Abdullah Zarban

Al-Ula	Al-Ahli

GK	1	(Brazil) Aline
LB	30	(Saudi Arabia) Asrar Al-Shaibani
CB	3	(Brazil) Tuani Lemos (C)
CB	19	(Saudi Arabia) Mariam Al-Tamimi	(yellow card) 78'
RB	26	(Bosnia and Herzegovina) Melisa Hasanbegović
DM	18	(Saudi Arabia) Majd Al-Otaibi	(yellow card) 28'	(substituted off) 77'
LM	99	(Cameroon) Rose Bella
CM	11	(Saudi Arabia) Hebah Bukhari	(yellow card) 22'	(substituted off) 52'
CM	7	(Bosnia and Herzegovina) Selma Kapetanović
RM	10	(Saudi Arabia) Safa Zedadka		(substituted off) 66'
ST	9	(Saudi Arabia) Shaima Belal
Substitutes:
FW	12	(Saudi Arabia) Dalal Abdulwasi		(substituted on) 52'
FW	20	(Saudi Arabia) Nadiyah Al-Dhidan		(substituted on) 66'
MF	77	(Saudi Arabia) Raghad Saleh	(yellow card) 90+3'	(substituted on) 77'
Manager:
(Malta) Ray Farrugia

GK	23	(United States) Lindsey Harris
LB	16	(Saudi Arabia) Huriyyah Al-Shamrani		(substituted off) 70'
CB	19	(Jordan) Ayah Al-Majali	(yellow card) 12'
CB	14	(Saudi Arabia) Farida Hanafi
RB	13	(Saudi Arabia) Tahani Al-Zahrani		(substituted off) 46'
DM	10	(Ghana) Alice Kusi		(substituted off) 70'
DM	11	(Saudi Arabia) Daliah Abu Laban	(substituted off) 83'
LW	17	(Saudi Arabia) Fadwa Khaled	(yellow card) 45+4'	(substituted off) 83'
AM	24	(Saudi Arabia) Moluk Al-Hawsawi
RW	7	(Democratic Republic of the Congo) Naomie Kabakaba
ST	9	(Morocco) Ibtissam Jraïdi (C)
Substitutes:
DF	22	(Saudi Arabia) Sawaher Asseri		(substituted on) 46'
MF	6	(Cameroon) Charlène Meyong		(substituted on) 70'
MF	42	(Saudi Arabia) Manal Al-Saud		(substituted on) 70'
DF	5	(Saudi Arabia) Raneem Al-Sharif		(substituted on) 83'
DF	3	(Saudi Arabia) Lareen Basyoni		(substituted on) 83'
Manager:
(Jordan) Manar Fraij

=== Final ===
8 September 2025
20:00

Al-Nassr	2–0	Al-Ahli
Abu Laban 46' (o.g.); Faria 90+4'	Report

Al-Shabab Club Stadium, Riyadh
Referee: Fareeh Al-Jaloud

Al-Nassr	Al-Ahli

GK	21	(Saudi Arabia) Mona Abdulrahman
DF	22	(Saudi Arabia) Shuruq Al-Hwsawi
DF	14	(Brazil) Kathellen	(yellow card) 19'
DF	6	(Saudi Arabia) Aseel Ahmed
MF	8	(Saudi Arabia) Sara Al-Hamad	(yellow card) 67'	(substituted off) 90+6'
MF	69	(France) Nesrine Bahlouli	(yellow card) 82' (yellow-red card) 90+6'
MF	20	(Brazil) Duda Francelino (C)
MF	7	(Saudi Arabia) Basmah Al-Shnaifi	(yellow card) 80'
FW	11	(Democratic Republic of the Congo) Ruth Kipoyi		(substituted off) 60'
FW	10	(Saudi Arabia) Mubarkh Al-Saiari		(substituted off) 73'
FW	9	(Tanzania) Clara Luvanga
Substitutes:
MF	80	(Portugal) Andreia Faria	(yellow card) 75'	(substituted on) 60'
MF	5	(Saudi Arabia) Layan Yousef		(substituted on) 73'
MF	44	(Saudi Arabia) Wejdan Mohammed		(substituted on) 90+6'
Manager:
(Indonesia) Rudy Eka Priyambada

GK	23	(United States) Lindsey Harris
LB	16	(Saudi Arabia) Huriyyah Al-Shamrani	(yellow card) 22'
CB	19	(Jordan) Ayah Al-Majali
CB	14	(Saudi Arabia) Farida Hanafi
RB	13	(Saudi Arabia) Tahani Al-Zahrani		(substituted off) 83'
DM	10	(Ghana) Alice Kusi
DM	11	(Saudi Arabia) Daliah Abu Laban
LW	17	(Saudi Arabia) Fadwa Khaled
AM	24	(Saudi Arabia) Moluk Al-Hawsawi	(yellow card) 86'	(substituted off) 90+1'
RW	7	(Democratic Republic of the Congo) Naomie Kabakaba	(yellow card) 78'
ST	9	(Morocco) Ibtissam Jraïdi (C)
Substitutes:
DF	22	(Saudi Arabia) Sawaher Asseri		(substituted on) 83'
MF	42	(Saudi Arabia) Manal Al-Saud		(substituted on) 90+3'
Manager:
(Jordan) Manar Fraij

== See also ==
- 2025–26 Saudi Women's Premier League
