= 2024–25 Saudi Women's Premier League =

Saudi Women's Premier League
- Season: 2024–25
- Dates: 27 September 2024 – 25 April 2025
- Champions: Al-Nassr (3rd title)
- Relegated: Al-Amal; Al-Taraji
- AFC Women's Champions League: Al-Nassr
- Matches: 90
- Goals: 397 (4.41 per match)
- Best Player: (France) Léa Le Garrec
- Top goalscorer: (Morocco) Ibtissam Jraïdi (26 Goals)
- Best goalkeeper: (Slovenia) Zala Meršnik
- Biggest home win: Al-Qadsiah 9–0 Al-mal; 31 January 2025
- Biggest away win: Al-Taraji 0–11 Al-Nassr; 28 December 2024
- Highest scoring: Al-Qadsiah 9–2 Al-Taraji; 21 December 2024; Al-Taraji 0–11 Al-Nassr; 28 December 2024
- Longest winning run: 16 Games; Al-Nassr
- Longest unbeaten run: 16 Games; Al-Nassr
- Longest winless run: 18 Games; Al-Taraji
- Longest losing run: 18 Games; Al-Taraji

The 2024–25 Saudi Women's Premier League, was the 3rd season of the Saudi Women's Premier League, the top-level women's football league in Saudi Arabia. It's the first season featuring an expanded 10 teams, up from the 8 teams that competed in the previous two seasons.

Al-Nassr, the two-time defending champions, retained their title to become the first team to win three consecutive championships. They were dominant throughout the season, suffering only a single defeat in the entire campaign.

== Overview ==
=== League Developments and Strategic Growth ===
In May 2024, Grass Valley announced a cooperation agreement with Saudi Arabian Football Federation to distribute the 2024–25 Saudi Women's Premier League matches through its digital platform.

On 3 November 2024, the Saudi Arabian Federation announced the establishment of the Saudi Women's Super Cup, with this season's champions and runners-up set to qualify for its inaugural edition.

== Teams ==
Ten teams are set to compete in the 2024–25 Women's Premier League season, the highest number since the league's establishment in 2022. On 10 March 2024, Al-Ula and Al-Taraji secured their spots in the Saudi Women's Premier League for the first time by reaching the final of the 2023–24 Saudi Women's First Division League. Four days later, Al-Amal also booked their place for the first time by virtue of finishing third in the first division. These three newcomers replaced Al-Riyadh, who were relegated after a winless season.

Locations of the 2024–25 Women's Premier League teams

| Team | Location | Ground | Capacity | 2023-24 Season |
|---|---|---|---|---|
| Al-Ahli | Jeddah | Al-Ahli Club Stadium | 14,000 | 2nd |
| Al-Amal | Taif | Okaz Sport Club Stadium | 1,500 | D1, 3rd |
| Al-Hilal | Riyadh | Inaya Medical Colleges Stadium | 2,000 | 5th |
| Al-Ittihad | Jeddah | Al-Ittihad Club Stadium | 15,000 | 6th |
| Al-Nassr | Riyadh | Al Nassr Club Stadium | 10,000 | 1st |
| Al-Qadsiah | Khobar | Al Qadsiah Club Stadium | 11,000 | 4th |
| Al-Shabab | Riyadh | Al-Shabab Club Stadium | 28,000 | 3rd |
| Al-Taraji | Qatif | Prince Nayef bin Abdulaziz Stadium | 12,000 | D1, 2nd |
| Al-Ula | Medina | Prince Mohammed Bin Abdulaziz Sports City | 24,000 | D1, 1st |
| Eastern Flames | Dammam | Prince Fahad bin Salman Stadium | 15,000 | 7th |

=== Personnel and kits ===
| Team | Manager | Captain | Kit manufacturer | Shirt sponsor |
|---|---|---|---|---|
| Al-Ahli | (Jordan) Manar Fraij | (Morocco) Ibtissam Jraïdi | Adidas | Red Sea Global, urpay |
| Al-Amal | (Algeria) Ibrahim Adjou (Note: Although Adjou is the acting coach, the de facto head coach is Radia Fertoul.) | (Algeria) Imène Merrouche | Offside | The Specialists |
| Al-Hilal | (Spain) José Herrera | (Cameroon) Claudia Dabda | Puma | Jahez, Alwaleed Philanthropies |
| Al-Ittihad | (Brazil) Lindsay Camila | (Saudi Arabia) Bayan Sadagah | Nike | Roshn, SURJ Sports Investment |
| Al-Nassr | (Cape Verde) Sandro Mendes (Note: Although Mendes is the acting coach, the de facto head coach is Abdulaziz Al-Alwni.) | (Brazil) Kathellen | Adidas | KAFD |
| Al-Qadsiah | (Portugal) Luís Andrade | (Brazil) Rayanne Machado | Nike | Iz |
| Al-Shabab | (Spain) Raúl Pérez | (Saudi Arabia) Leen Mohammed | Offside | Yelo |
| Al-Taraji | (Saudi Arabia) Mohamad Al Kadadi | (Saudi Arabia) Fatimah Al-Sadah | Hattrick | |
| Al-Ula | (Malta) Ray Farrugia | (Brazil) Tuani Lemos | Skillano | AlUla |
| Eastern Flames | (Bahrain) Isa Al-Ainawy | (Saudi Arabia) Sara Al-Khatar | Puma | Calo |

=== Managerial changes ===
| Team | Outgoing manager | Manner of departure | Date of vacancy | Position in table | Incoming manager | Date of appointment |
|---|---|---|---|---|---|---|
| Al-Ula | (Netherlands) Mary Kok-Willemsen | Sacked | 12 October 2024 | 7th | (Saudi Arabia) Dona Rajab (interim) | 17 October 2024 |
| Al-Ula | (Saudi Arabia) Dona Rajab (interim) | End of interim period | 4 November 2024 | 7th | (Malta) Ray Farrugia | 4 November 2024 |
| Al-Taraji | (Spain) David Pérez | Sacked | December 2024 | 10th | (Saudi Arabia) Mohamad Al Kadadi | December 2024 |

== Foreign players ==
On 12 June 2024, the Saudi Arabian Football Federation implemented detailed changes regarding foreign players and Saudi-born (Al-Mawalled) players in women's competitions for the 2024–2025 season. The number of non-Saudi players in the main roster has been reduced from 7 to 6 (with one out of 6 meeting specific criteria), the on-field limit has been increased from 4 to 5.

| Club | Foreign players | | | | | |
| Club | Player 1 | Player 2 | Player 3 | Player 4 | Player 5 | Player 6 |
|---|---|---|---|---|---|---|
| Al-Ahli | (Democratic Republic of the Congo) Naomie Kabakaba | (Ghana) Alice Kusi | (Jordan) Ayah Al-Majali | (Jordan) Rawand Kassab | (Morocco) Ibtissam Jraïdi | (Morocco) Élodie Nakkach |
| Al-Amal | (Algeria) Noura Bouaita | (Algeria) Ferial Daoui | (Algeria) Imène Merrouche | (Argentina) Milagros Menéndez | (Cameroon) Brigitte Omboudou | (Ecuador) Irene Tobar |
| Al-Hilal | (Brazil) Aline | (Cameroon) Claudia Dabda | (Ghana) Mavis Owusu | (Iraq) Shokhan Salihi | (Panama) Aldrith Quintero | (Paraguay) Jessica Martínez |
| Al-Ittihad | (Brazil) Letícia Nunes | (England) Leighanne Robe | (Lebanon) Lili Iskandar | (Nigeria) Francisca Ordega | (Nigeria) Ashleigh Plumptre | (Slovenia) Zala Meršnik |
| Al-Nassr | (Algeria) Lina Boussaha | (Brazil) Duda Francelino | (Brazil) Kathellen | (Democratic Republic of the Congo) Ruth Kipoyi | (France) Nesrine Bahlouli | (Tanzania) Clara Luvanga |
| Al-Qadsiah | (Brazil) Adriana | (Brazil) Rayanne Machado | (Cameroon) Ajara Nchout | (France) Léa Le Garrec | (Iceland) Sara Björk Gunnarsdóttir | (United States) Lindsey Harris |
| Al-Shabab | (Democratic Republic of the Congo) Falonne Pambani | (France) Kheira Hamraoui | (Ghana) Sherifatu Sumaila | (Jordan) Lana Feras | (Spain) María Díaz Cirauqui | (Spain) Patricia Padilla |
| Al-Taraji | (Bahrain) Hajar Al-Ansari | (Brazil) Mayara Gonçalves | (Democratic Republic of the Congo) Grâce Mfwamba | (Tunisia) Wafe Messaoud | | |
| Al-Ula | (Bosnia and Herzegovina) Melisa Hasanbegović | (Bosnia and Herzegovina) Selma Kapetanović | (Brazil) Jaine Lemke | (Brazil) Tuani Lemos | (France) Sarah Bouhaddi | (Ivory Coast) Ange N'Guessan |
| Eastern Flames | (Brazil) Keikei | (Cape Verde) Jolina Amani | (Pakistan) Maria Khan | (South Africa) Noxolo Cesane | (Syria) Nor Mustafa | (Tunisia) Samia Aouni |

Former players

| Club | Foreign players | | |
| Club | Player 1 | Player 2 | Player 3 |
|---|---|---|---|
| Al-Amal | (Ivory Coast) Stéphanie Gbogou | (Ivory Coast) Mariam Sidibé | (Philippines) Dominique Randle |
| Al-Ittihad | (Jordan) Shahnaz Jebreen | | |
| Al-Qadsiah | (Ivory Coast) Jessica Aby | | |
| Al-Shabab | (Nigeria) Chinonyerem Macleans | (North Macedonia) Nataša Andonova | |
| Al-Taraji | (Tunisia) Dhekra Mahfoudh | | |
| Al-Ula | (Croatia) Fatjesa Gegollaj | | |

=== Domestic Status of Foreign Players ===
The following foreign players are considered domestic due to one or more of the following: being Saudi-born (Al-Mawaleed) or having a residency permit, while they continue to represent other countries in international competitions. The foreign player restrictions do not apply to them. On the other hand, teams are allowed to register only two Saudi-born players (Al-Mawaleed; players born in 2004 or later), with only one permitted to play on the field.

| Club | Foreign players | | |
| Club | Player 1 | Player 2 | Player 3 |
|---|---|---|---|
| Al-Ahli | (Egypt) (Saudi Arabia) Farida Hanafi | | |
| Al-Hilal | (Morocco) Maryam Benkirane | (Egypt) Lamar Abousamra | (Jordan) Joury Hashem |
| Al-Nassr | (Palestine) Etaf Al-Sawi | | |
| Al-Ula | (Algeria) Safa Zedadka | (Egypt) Tasnim Ahmed | (Yemen) Hadeel Jehran |

1. players born in 2004 or later, with only one per team allowed to play on the field.
2. Farida Hanafi, an Egyptian national who had residency up to the 16th round, acquired Saudi nationality in April 2025 and was subsequently called up to the Saudi national team, thereby becoming eligible as a local player.

== League table ==
| Pos | Team | Pld | W | D | L | GF | GA | GD | Pts | Qualification or relegation |
|---|---|---|---|---|---|---|---|---|---|---|
| 1 | Al-Nassr (C) | 18 | 17 | 0 | 1 | 70 | 17 | +53 | 51 | Qualification for the 2025–26 AFC Women's Champions League |
| 2 | Al-Ahli | 18 | 13 | 1 | 4 | 73 | 27 | +46 | 40 | |
| 3 | Al-Qadsiah | 18 | 10 | 5 | 3 | 60 | 20 | +40 | 35 | |
| 4 | Al-Shabab | 18 | 10 | 2 | 6 | 44 | 24 | +20 | 32 | |
| 5 | Al-Ula | 18 | 9 | 2 | 7 | 36 | 30 | +6 | 29 | |
| 6 | Al-Hilal | 18 | 9 | 1 | 8 | 35 | 26 | +9 | 28 | |
| 7 | Al-Ittihad | 18 | 8 | 1 | 9 | 38 | 28 | +10 | 25 | |
| 8 | Eastern Flames | 18 | 3 | 3 | 12 | 10 | 59 | −49 | 12 | |
| 9 | Al-Amal | 18 | 3 | 1 | 14 | 23 | 58 | −35 | 10 | Relegation to the 2025–26 First Division League |
| 10 | Al-Taraji | 18 | 0 | 0 | 18 | 8 | 108 | −100 | 0 | Relegation to the 2025–26 First Division League |

Source: SAFF
Rules for classification: 1) Points; 2) Goal difference; 3) Number of goals scored.
(C) Champions

== Results ==
| Home \ Away | NAS | AHL | QDS | SHB | ULA | HIL | ITH | EFL | AML | TRJ |
|---|---|---|---|---|---|---|---|---|---|---|
| Al-Nassr | | 3–1 | 3–1 | 4–3 | 3–1 | 4–0 | 2–1 | 7–0 | 3–0 | 6–0 |
| Al-Ahli | 2–4 | | 3–3 | 1–2 | 5–0 | 3–1 | 3–1 | 4–1 | 8–2 | 5–0 |
| Al-Qadsiah | 1–2 | 3–2 | | 3–0 | 5–1 | 2–1 | 4–1 | 0–0 | 9–0 | 9–2 |
| Al-Shabab | 1–2 | 2–6 | 1–4 | | 0–0 | 1–0 | 4–2 | 6–0 | 4–0 | 7–0 |
| Al-Ula | 0–4 | 0–2 | 0–0 | 1–2 | | 3–1 | 2–0 | 5–0 | 2–0 | 5–2 |
| Al-Hilal | 3–2 | 1–4 | 1–1 | 1–0 | 0–1 | | 2–0 | 4–0 | 1–2 | 3–0 |
| Al-Ittihad | 1–3 | 2–4 | 2–1 | 0–0 | 1–0 | 1–3 | | 4–0 | 3–0 | 9–0 |
| Eastern Flames | 1–5 | 0–6 | 0–0 | 0–2 | 2–6 | 0–2 | 0–6 | | 1–0 | 2–0 |
| Al-Amal | 1–2 | 2–6 | 1–6 | 0–5 | 2–3 | 1–2 | 0–1 | 1–1 | | 5–0 |
| Al-Taraji | 0–11 | 0–8 | 0–8 | 0–4 | 1–6 | 1–9 | 0–3 | 1–2 | 1–6 | |

Source: SAFF
Legend: Blue = home team win; Yellow = draw; Red = away team win.

== Positions by round ==
The following table lists the positions of teams after each week of matches. In order to preserve the chronological evolution, any postponed matches are not included in the round at which they were originally scheduled but added to the full round they were played immediately afterward.

| Team ╲ Round | 1 | 2 | 3 | 4 | 5 | 6 | 7 | 8 | 9 | 10 | 11 | 12 | 13 | 14 | 15 | 16 | 17 | 18 |
|---|---|---|---|---|---|---|---|---|---|---|---|---|---|---|---|---|---|---|
| Al-Nassr | 4 | 3 | 2 | 2 | 2 | 2 | 1 | 1 | 1 | 1 | 1 | 1 | 1 | 1 | 1 | 1 | 1 | 1 |
| Al-Ahli | 1 | 1 | 1 | 1 | 1 | 1 | 2 | 2 | 2 | 2 | 2 | 2 | 2 | 2 | 2 | 2 | 2 | 2 |
| Al-Qadsiah | 6 | 8 | 8 | 6 | 6 | 6 | 6 | 4 | 4 | 4 | 5 | 5 | 5 | 5 | 4 | 3 | 3 | 3 |
| Al-Shabab | 2 | 2 | 4 | 4 | 4 | 3 | 4 | 3 | 3 | 3 | 3 | 3 | 3 | 3 | 3 | 4 | 4 | 4 |
| Al-Ula | 7 | 5 | 7 | 8 | 8 | 9 | 8 | 7 | 7 | 7 | 6 | 6 | 6 | 6 | 6 | 6 | 6 | 5 |
| Al-Hilal | 3 | 4 | 3 | 3 | 3 | 4 | 3 | 5 | 6 | 5 | 4 | 4 | 4 | 4 | 5 | 5 | 5 | 6 |
| Al-Ittihad | 5 | 6 | 5 | 5 | 5 | 5 | 5 | 6 | 5 | 6 | 7 | 7 | 7 | 7 | 7 | 7 | 7 | 7 |
| Eastern Flames | 9 | 7 | 6 | 7 | 7 | 7 | 7 | 8 | 8 | 8 | 8 | 8 | 8 | 8 | 8 | 8 | 8 | 8 |
| Al-Amal | 8 | 9 | 9 | 9 | 9 | 8 | 9 | 9 | 9 | 9 | 9 | 9 | 9 | 9 | 9 | 9 | 9 | 9 |
| Al-Taraji | 10 | 10 | 10 | 10 | 10 | 10 | 10 | 10 | 10 | 10 | 10 | 10 | 10 | 10 | 10 | 10 | 10 | 10 |

| Leader and AFC Women's Champions League |
| Relegation to Saudi Women's First Division League |
| Relegation to Saudi Women's First Division League |

Source: SAFF

== Season statistics ==
=== Top scorers ===
| Rank | Player | Club | Goals |
|---|---|---|---|
| 1 | (Morocco) Ibtissam Jraïdi | Al-Ahli | 26 |
| 2 | (Cameroon) Ajara Nchout | Al-Qadsiah | 24 |
| 3 | (Democratic Republic of the Congo) Naomie Kabakaba | Al-Ahli | 21 |
| 4 | (Tanzania) Clara Luvanga | Al-Nassr | 19 |
| 5 | (Brazil) Duda Francelino | Al-Nassr | 16 |
| 6 | (Paraguay) Jessica Martínez | Al-Hilal | 14 |
| 6 | (Brazil) Letícia Nunes | Al-Ittihad | 14 |
| 8 | (Algeria) Imène Merrouche | Al-Amal | 11 |
| 8 | (Algeria) Lina Boussaha | Al-Nassr | 11 |
| 10 | (Iceland) Sara Gunnarsdóttir | Al-Qadsiah | 9 |
| 10 | (Democratic Republic of the Congo) Ruth Kipoyi | Al-Nassr | 9 |
| 10 | (Brazil) Jaine Lemke | Al-Ula | 9 |

=== Top assists ===
| Rank | Player | Club | Assists |
|---|---|---|---|
| 1 | (France) Léa Le Garrec | Al-Qadsiah | 23 |
| 2 | (Morocco) Ibtissam Jraïdi | Al-Ahli | 12 |
| 3 | (Ghana) Alice Kusi | Al-Ahli | 11 |
| 4 | (France) Nesrine Bahlouli | Al-Nassr | 10 |
| 5 | (Democratic Republic of the Congo) Ruth Kipoyi | Al-Nassr | 7 |
| 5 | (Tanzania) Clara Luvanga | Al-Nassr | 7 |
| 5 | (Ghana) Mavis Owusu | Al-Hilal | 7 |
| 8 | (Algeria) Lina Boussaha | Al-Nassr | 6 |
| 8 | (Bosnia and Herzegovina) Selma Kapetanović | Al-Ula | 6 |
| 8 | (Ivory Coast) Ange N'Guessan | Al-Ula | 6 |
| 8 | (Cameroon) Ajara Nchout | Al-Qadsiah | 6 |
| 8 | (Nigeria) Ashleigh Plumptre | Al-Ittihad | 6 |

=== Clean sheets ===
| Rank | Player | Club | Clean sheets |
|---|---|---|---|
| 1 | (France) Sarah Bouhaddi | Al-Ula | 6 |
| 1 | (United States) Lindsey Harris | Al-Qadsiah | 6 |
| 1 | (Saudi Arabia) Sara Khalid | Al-Nassr | 6 |
| 1 | (Slovenia) Zala Meršnik | Al-Ittihad | 6 |
| 5 | (Saudi Arabia) Laila Al-Qahtani | Al-Shabab | 5 |
| 6 | (Brazil) Aline | Al-Hilal | 4 |
| 6 | (Brazil) Keikei | Eastern Flames | 4 |
| 6 | (Saudi Arabia) Mona Abdulrahman | Al-Shabab | 4 |
| 9 | (Jordan) Rawand Kassab | Al-Ahli | 3 |
| 9 | (Saudi Arabia) Ghaliah Emam | Al-Ahli | 3 |

=== Hat-tricks ===
| Player | For | Against | Result | Date | Ref. |
|---|---|---|---|---|---|
| (Democratic Republic of the Congo) Naomie Kabakaba | Al-Ahli | Al-Amal | 6–2 (A) | 27 September 2024 | |
| (Democratic Republic of the Congo) Naomie Kabakaba | Al-Ahli | Al-Hilal | 4–1 (A) | 7 February 2025 | |
| (Ghana) Mavis Owusu | Al-Hilal | Eastern Flames | 4–0 (H) | 28 September 2024 | |
| (Ghana) Mavis Owusu | Al-Hilal | Al-Taraji | 9–1 (A) | 12 October 2024 | |
| (Morocco) Ibtissam Jraïdi | Al-Ahli | Al-Shabab | 6–2 (A) | 11 October 2024 | |
| (Morocco) Ibtissam Jraïdi | Al-Ahli | Al-Amal | 8–2 (H) | 10 January 2025 | |
| (Morocco) Ibtissam Jraïdi | Al-Ahli | Al-Taraji | 8–0 (A) | 31 January 2025 | |
| (Paraguay) Jessica Martínez | Al-Hilal | Al-Taraji | 9–1 (A) | 12 October 2024 | |
| (Cameroon) Ajara Nchout | Al-Qadsiah | Al-Amal | 6–1 (A) | 8 November 2024 | |
| (Cameroon) Ajara Nchout | Al-Qadsiah | Al-Ula | 5–1 (H) | 15 November 2024 | |
| (Cameroon) Ajara Nchout | Al-Qadsiah | Al-Taraji | 9–2 (H) | 21 December 2024 | |
| (Cameroon) Ajara Nchout | Al-Qadsiah | Al-Ittihad | 4–1 (H) | 11 January 2025 | |
| (Cameroon) Ajara Nchout | Al-Qadsiah | Al-Amal | 9–0 (H) | 31 January 2025 | |
| (Algeria) Lina Boussaha | Al-Nassr | Al-Shabab | 4–3 (H) | 16 November 2024 | |
| (Nigeria) Chinonyerem Macleans | Al-Shabab | Eastern Flames | 6–0 (H) | 21 November 2024 | |
| (Algeria) Imène Merrouche | Al-Amal | Al-Taraji | 6–1 (A) | 22 November 2024 | |
| (Algeria) Imène Merrouche | Al-Amal | Al-Taraji | 5–0 (A) | 8 March 2025 | |
| (Brazil) Letícia Nunes | Al-Ittihad | Al-Taraji | 3–0 (A) | 14 December 2024 | |
| (Brazil) Letícia Nunes | Al-Ittihad | Eastern Flames | 4–0 (H) | 27 December 2024 | |
| (Brazil) Duda Francelino | Al-Nassr | Al-Taraji | 11–0 (A) | 27 December 2024 | |
| (Brazil) Duda Francelino | Al-Nassr | Al-Ula | 4–0 (A) | 11 January 2025 | |
| (Brazil) Duda Francelino | Al-Nassr | Al-Taraji | 6–0 (H) | 23 April 2025 | |
| (France) Kheira Hamraoui | Al-Shabab | Al-Taraji | 7–0 (H) | 12 January 2025 | |
| (Tanzania) Clara Luvanga | Al-Nassr | Eastern Flames | 7–0 (H) | 31 January 2025 | |
| (Tanzania) Clara Luvanga | Al-Nassr | Al-Taraji | 6–0 (H) | 23 April 2025 | |
| (Saudi Arabia) Sulaf Asiri | Al-Qadsiah | Al-Taraji | 8–0 (A) | 18 April 2025 | |

=== Discipline ===
| | Most yellow cards | Total | Most red cards | Total | Ref. |
|---|---|---|---|---|---|
| Player | (Tunisia) Dhekra Mahfoudh (Al-Taraji) | 6 | (Brazil) Mayara (Al-Taraji) | 2 | |
| Club | Al-Shabab; Al-Taraji; Al-Ula | 18 | Al-Taraji | 4 | |

== Individual awards ==
=== Monthly awards ===
| Month | Manager of the Month | | Player of the Month | | Goalkeeper of the Month | |
| Month | Manager | Club | Player | Club | Player | Club |
|---|---|---|---|---|---|---|
| September/October | (Spain) José Herrera | Al-Hilal | (Morocco) Ibtissam Jraïdi | Al-Ahli | (Brazil) Aline | Al-Hilal |
| November | (Jordan) Manar Fraij | Al-Ahli | (Saudi Arabia) Al-Bandary Mobarak | Al-Shabab | (Saudi Arabia) Ghaliah Emam | Al-Ahli |
| December | (Malta) Ray Farrugia | Al-Ula | (France) Léa Le Garrec | Al-Qadsiah | (Brazil) Aline | Al-Hilal |
| January | (Jordan) Manar Fraij | Al-Ahli | (Morocco) Ibtissam Jraïdi | Al-Ahli | (Saudi Arabia) Sara Khalid | Al-Nassr |
| February/March | (Portugal) Luís Andrade | Al-Qadsiah | (Nigeria) Francisca Ordega | Al-Ittihad | (Ecuador) Irene Tobar | Al-Amal |

=== Weekly awards ===
==== Goal of the Week ====
| Week | Goal of the Week | | Ref. |
| Week | Player | Club | Ref. |
|---|---|---|---|
| 1 | (North Macedonia) Nataša Andonova | Al-Shabab | |
| 2 | (Saudi Arabia) Nadiyah Al-Dhidan | Al-Ula | |
| 3 | (Algeria) Imène Merrouche | Al-Amal | |
| 4 | (Saudi Arabia) Basmah Al-Shnaifi | Al-Nassr | |
| 5 | (Paraguay) Jessica Martínez | Al-Hilal | |
| 6 | (Brazil) Letícia Nunes | Al-Ittihad | |
| 7 | (Saudi Arabia) Basmah Al-Shnaifi | Al-Nassr | |
| 8 | (Saudi Arabia) Fadwa Khaled | Al-Ahli | |
| 9 | (France) Léa Le Garrec | Al-Qadsiah | |
| 10 | (Morocco) Ibtissam Jraïdi | Al-Ahli | |
| 11 | (Morocco) Ibtissam Jraïdi | Al-Ahli | |
| 12 | (Tanzania) Clara Luvanga | Al-Nassr | |
| 13 | (France) Léa Le Garrec | Al-Qadsiah | |
| 14 | (Saudi Arabia) Al-Bandary Mobarak | Al-Shabab | |
| 15 | (France) Léa Le Garrec | Al-Qadsiah | |
| 16 | (Saudi Arabia) Farah Jefry | Al-Ittihad | |
| 17 | (France) Léa Le Garrec | Al-Qadsiah | |

==== Team of the Week ====
| Week | Goalkeeper | Defenders | Midfielders | Forwards | Ref. |
|---|---|---|---|---|---|
| 1 | (Slovenia) Zala Meršnik, ITI | (Saudi Arabia) Tahani Al-Zahrani, SHB; (Jordan) Ayah Al-Majali, AHL; (Brazil) Rayanne Machado, QDS; (Saudi Arabia) Leen Mohammed, SHB | (France) Kheira Hamraoui, SHB; (Democratic Republic of the Congo) Ruth Kipoyi, NSR; (Morocco) Élodie Nakkach, AHL | (Democratic Republic of the Congo) Naomie Kabakaba, AHL; (North Macedonia) Nataša Andonova, SHB; (Ghana) Mavis Owusu, HIL | |
| 2 | (Slovenia) Zala Meršnik, ITI | (Saudi Arabia) Leen Mohammed, SHB; (Jordan) Lana Feras, SHB; (Brazil) Tuani Lemos, ULA; (Saudi Arabia) Shuruq Al-Hwsawi, HIL | (Democratic Republic of the Congo) Naomie Kabakaba, AHL; (Algeria) Lina Boussaha, NSR; (Bosnia and Herzegovina) Selma Kapetanović, ULA; (South Africa) Noxolo Cesane, EFL | (Brazil) Jaine Lemke, ULA; (Saudi Arabia) Daliah Abu Laban, AHL | |
| 3 | (Slovenia) Zala Meršnik, ITI | (Saudi Arabia) Shuruq Al-Hwsawi, HIL; (Brazil) Kathellen, NSR; (Brazil) Rayanne Machado, QDS; (Saudi Arabia) Dalal Abdullatif, QDS | (Democratic Republic of the Congo) Naomie Kabakaba, AHL; (Paraguay) Jessica Martínez, HIL; (Ghana) Alice Kusi, AHL; (Ghana) Mavis Owusu, HIL | (Morocco) Ibtissam Jraïdi, AHL; (Saudi Arabia) Al-Bandari Al-Hwsawi, HIL | |
| 4 | (Brazil) Mayara, TRJ | (Saudi Arabia) Aseel Ahmed, NSR; (Brazil) Kathellen, NSR; (Jordan) Ayah Al-Majali, AHL; (Saudi Arabia) Sara Al-Hamad, NSR | (Democratic Republic of the Congo) Naomie Kabakaba, AHL; (Algeria) Lina Boussaha, NSR; (Ghana) Alice Kusi, AHL; (Democratic Republic of the Congo) Ruth Kipoyi, NSR | (Cameroon) Ajara Nchout, QDS; (Saudi Arabia) Al-Bandari Mobarak, SHB | |
| 5 | (Slovenia) Zala Meršnik, ITI | (Saudi Arabia) Sawaher Al-Asiri, AHL; (Brazil) Rayanne Machado, QDS; (Pakistan) Maria Khan, EFL; (Saudi Arabia) Sadaa Ibrahim, EFL | (Democratic Republic of the Congo) Naomie Kabakaba, AHL; (Algeria) Lina Boussaha, NSR; (France) Léa Le Garrec, QDS; (Lebanon) Lili Iskandar, ITI | (Cameroon) Ajara Nchout, QDS; (Syria) Nor Mustafa, EFL | |
| 6 | (Brazil) Keikei, EFL | (Saudi Arabia) Aseel Ahmed, NSR; (Spain) Patricia Padilla, SHB; (Jordan) Lana Feras, SHB; (Saudi Arabia) Noura Ibrahim, SHB | (Algeria) Imène Merrouche, AML; (Algeria) Lina Boussaha, NSR; (North Macedonia) Nataša Andonova, SHB; (Algeria) Ferial Daoui, AML | (Morocco) Ibtissam Jraïdi, AHL; (Nigeria) Chinonyerem Macleans, SHB | |
| 7 | (United States) Lindsey Harris, QDS | (Saudi Arabia) Asrar Al-Shaibani, ITI; (Brazil) Rayanne Machado, QDS; (Bosnia and Herzegovina) Melisa Hasanbegović, ULA; (Saudi Arabia) Bayan Sadagah, ITI | (Bosnia and Herzegovina) Selma Kapetanović, ULA; (France) Léa Le Garrec, QDS; (Saudi Arabia) Basmah Al-Shnaifi, NSR; (Democratic Republic of the Congo) Ruth Kipoyi, NSR | (Brazil) Letícia Nunes, ITI; (Brazil) Jaine Lemke, ULA | |
| 8 | (France) Sarah Bouhaddi, ULA | (Saudi Arabia) Aseel Ahmed, NSR; (Jordan) Ayah Al-Majali, AHL; (Bosnia and Herzegovina) Melisa Hasanbegović, ULA; (Egypt) Farida Hanafi, AHL | (Democratic Republic of the Congo) Naomie Kabakaba, AHL; (France) Léa Le Garrec, QDS; (Ghana) Alice Kusi, AHL; (Spain) Patricia Padilla, SHB | (Cameroon) Ajara Nchout, QDS; (Saudi Arabia) Moluk Al-Hawsawi, AHL | |
| 9 | (France) Sarah Bouhaddi, ULA | (Saudi Arabia) Aseel Ahmed, NSR; (Nigeria) Ashleigh Plumptre, ITI; (Jordan) Lana Feras, SHB; (Saudi Arabia) Sara Al-Hamad, NSR | (Jordan) Shahnaz Jebreen, ITI; (Brazil) Duda Francelino, NSR; (North Macedonia) Nataša Andonova, SHB; (Democratic Republic of the Congo) Ruth Kipoyi, NSR | (Morocco) Ibtissam Jraïdi, AHL; (Brazil) Letícia Nunes, ITI | |
| 10 | (Slovenia) Zala Meršnik, ITI | (Saudi Arabia) Shuruq Al-Hwsawi, HIL; (Brazil) Rayanne Machado, QDS; (Jordan) Lana Feras, SHB; (Saudi Arabia) Sara Al-Hamad, NSR | (Democratic Republic of the Congo) Naomie Kabakaba, AHL; (Democratic Republic of the Congo) Ruth Kipoyi, NSR; (France) Kheira Hamraoui, SHB; (Cameroon) Ajara Nchout, QDS | (Morocco) Ibtissam Jraïdi, AHL; (Spain) María Díaz Cirauqui, SHB | |
| 11 | (Brazil) Aline, HIL | (Saudi Arabia) Shuruq Al-Hwsawi, HIL; (Brazil) Kathellen, NSR; (Brazil) Tuani Lemos, ULA; (Saudi Arabia) Mariam Al-Tamimi, ULA | (Democratic Republic of the Congo) Naomie Kabakaba, AHL; (Brazil) Jaine Lemke, ULA; (Ghana) Alice Kusi, AHL; (Saudi Arabia) Fadwa Khaled, AHL | (Morocco) Ibtissam Jraïdi, AHL; (Saudi Arabia) Nawras Al-Khaldi, ULA | |
| 12 | (Brazil) Mayara, TRJ | (Saudi Arabia) Dalal Abdullatif, QDS; (Brazil) Kathellen, NSR; (Saudi Arabia) Munirah Al-Ghanam, QDS; (Saudi Arabia) Sara Al-Hamad, NSR | (Saudi Arabia) Abeer Nasser, SHB; (Democratic Republic of the Congo) Ruth Kipoyi, NSR; (Ivory Coast) Ange N'Guessan, ULA; (Paraguay) Jessica Martínez, HIL | (Tanzania) Clara Luvanga, NSR; (Saudi Arabia) Al-Bandari Al-Hwsawi, HIL | |
| 13 | (France) Sarah Bouhaddi, ULA | (Saudi Arabia) Huriyyah Al-Shamrani, AHL; (Brazil) Kathellen, NSR; (Brazil) Rayanne Machado, QDS; (Saudi Arabia) Leen Mohammed, SHB | (Democratic Republic of the Congo) Naomie Kabakaba, AHL; (France) Léa Le Garrec, QDS; (France) Nesrine Bahlouli, NSR; (Saudi Arabia) Noura Ibrahim, QDS | (Cameroon) Ajara Nchout, QDS; (Morocco) Ibtissam Jraïdi, AHL | |
| 14 | (France) Sarah Bouhaddi, ULA | (Saudi Arabia) Jana Al-Habib, TRJ; (Bosnia and Herzegovina) Melisa Hasanbegović, ULA; (Nigeria) Ashleigh Plumptre, QDS; (Saudi Arabia) Sawaher Al-Asiri, AHL | (Democratic Republic of the Congo) Naomie Kabakaba, AHL; (Saudi Arabia) Lana Abdulrazak, ITI; (South Africa) Noxolo Cesane, EFL; (Saudi Arabia) Fatimah Mansour, ITI | (Syria) Nor Mustafa, EFL; (Saudi Arabia) Daliah Abu Laban, AHL | |
| 15 | (Brazil) Keikei, EFL | (Saudi Arabia) Huriyyah Al-Shamrani, AHL; (Jordan) Ayah Al-Majali, AHL; (Egypt) Farida Hanafi, AHL; (Saudi Arabia) Sawaher Al-Asiri, AHL | (Democratic Republic of the Congo) Naomie Kabakaba, AHL; (Algeria) Imène Merrouche, AML; (Morocco) Élodie Nakkach, AHL; (Saudi Arabia) Moluk Al-Hawsawi, AHL | (Nigeria) Francisca Ordega, ITI; (Iraq) Shokhan Salihi, HIL | |
| 16 | (United States) Lindsey Harris, QDS | (Saudi Arabia) Raneem Al-Sharif, ITI; (England) Leighanne Robe, ITI; (Bosnia and Herzegovina) Melisa Hasanbegović, ULA; (Saudi Arabia) Ghadeer Al-Balawi, ULA | (Nigeria) Francisca Ordega, ITI; (Algeria) Imène Merrouche, AML; (Nigeria) Ashleigh Plumptre, AHL; (Saudi Arabia) Fatimah Mansour, ITI | (Cameroon) Ajara Nchout, QDS; (Saudi Arabia) Shaima Belal, ULA | |
| 17 | (Saudi Arabia) Laila Al-Qahtani, SHB | (Saudi Arabia) Dalal Abdullatif, QDS; (Saudi Arabia) Mashael Al-Harbi, QDS; (England) Leighanne Robe, ITI; (Saudi Arabia) Noura Ibrahim, QDS | (France) Léa Le Garrec, QDS; (Iceland) Sara Björk Gunnarsdóttir, QDS; (Morocco) Élodie Nakkach, AHL; (Bosnia and Herzegovina) Selma Kapetanović, ULA | (Brazil) Adriana, QDS; (Saudi Arabia) Sulaf Asiri, QDS | |
