= Maya Al-Zahrani =

Saudi footballer (born 2008)

Personal information
- Full name: Maya Al-Zahrani
- Date of birth: 21 October 2008 (age 18)
- Place of birth: Saudi Arabia
- Position: Defender

Team information
- Current team: Al-Ahli
- Number: 88

Senior career*
Years	Team	Apps	(Gls)
2022–2023	Jeddah Pride		
2023–2025	Al-Ahli		
2025–	Al-Ula		

International career
2023	Saudi Arabia U17		
2024–	Saudi Arabia U20		
- * Club domestic league appearances and goals

Maya Abdulrahman Al-Zahrani (Arabic: مايا عبدالرحمن الزهراني; born 21 October 2008) is a Saudi footballer who plays as a Defender for Saudi Women's Premier League club Al-Ula.

== Club career ==
Al-Zahrani started playing with Jeddah Pride in the 2022/2023 season of the Saudi Women's First Division League.

In the following season 2023/2024, Al-Zahrani moved to Al-Ahli to participate in the Saudi Women's Premier League matches and also as captain of the U-17 team in the first edition of the Saudi Women's U-17 Tournament.

In 2024/2025, Maya Al Zahrani continued to play with Al-Ahli in the 2024–25 Saudi Women's Premier League, while continuing as captain with the U17 team in the second edition of the Saudi Women's U-17 Tournament.

In July 2025, Al Zahrani moved to Al-Ula.

== International career ==
In February 2023, Al-Zahrani was selected for the inaugural under-17 team to face Kuwait in double friendly matches.

On 21 October 2024, Al-Zahrani joined the Saudi Arabia u-20 women's national football team to play two friendly matches against Tajikistan in Jeddah.
