= Lareen Basyoni =

Saudi footballer (born 2009)

Personal information
- Full name: Lareen Abdulaziz Basyoni
- Date of birth: 22 December 2008 (age 17)
- Place of birth: Saudi Arabia
- Position: Defender

Team information
- Current team: Al-Ittihad

Youth career
- 2024: Al-Ahli

Senior career*
Years	Team	Apps	(Gls)
2025–2026	Al-Ahli	1	
2026–	Al-Ittihad		

International career
2025–	Saudi Arabia U20		
- * Club domestic league appearances and goals

Lareen Abdulaziz Basyoni (Arabic: لارين عبدالعزيز بسيوني; born 10 January 2005) is a Saudi footballer who plays as a Defender for Saudi Women's Premier League club Al-Ittihad.

== Club career ==
In February 2024, Basyoni was selected among the 18 best players from the Girls’ Schools League known as (Dawri Madaris) to participate with them in a training camp held in Madrid.

In the following season 2024/2025, Basyoni participated with the Al-Ahli U-17 team in the Saudi Women's U-17 Tournament, and she scored 8 goals.

In the summer of 2025, Lareen Basyoni was promoted to the Al-Ahli first team, playing against Al-Ula in the 2025 Saudi Women's Super Cup and then against NEOM in the 2025–26 Saudi Women's Premier League.

In August 2026, Al-Ittihad signed Basyoni to a contract running until 2027.

== International career ==
On 18 February 2025, Basyoni joined the Saudi Arabia u-20 women's national football team with Scottish coach Pauline Hamill in the Jeddah camp and Dammam camp on 3 April 2025.
