= José Ángel Herrera =

Spanish football manager (born 1989)

José Herrera
Personal information
- Full name: José Ángel Herrera Martín
- Date of birth: 18 December 1989 (age 36)
- Place of birth: Santa Cruz de Tenerife; Canary Islands, Spain
- Height: 1.70 m (5 ft 7 in)

Team information
- Current team: Manchester United (assistant)

Managerial career
- Years: Team
- 2015–2019: Tenerife (assistant)
- 2019–2020: Malaga
- 2020–2021: Granada
- 2021–2023: Tenerife (assistant)
- 2023–2024: Tenerife
- 2024–2025: Al Hilal
- 2026–: Manchester United (assistant)

José Ángel Herrera Martín (Spanish pronunciation: [xoˈse ˈaŋxel eˈreɾa maɾˈtin]; born 18 December 1989) is a Spanish professional association football manager. As of 2026, he currently serves as an assistant coach for Manchester United, a club competing in the Women's Super League.

== Early life ==
Born in Tenerife, Herrera began coaching at the age of 16, initially working with youth and lower-category teams while completing his education. Herrera trained as a Base-football Instructor and later obtained a UEFA Pro coaching license, combining his coaching work with studies in teaching and physical education.

== Managerial career ==
Herrera began his coaching career in 2007 at CD Tenerife's Suma Campus. In 2011, he was appointed head coach of the EF Rommel Fernández cadete team, marking his first role in youth development.

He later joined Granadilla Tenerife, serving as assistant coach and technical analyst from 2015 to 2019. During this period, he contributed to the team's qualification for the semi-finals of the 2017 Copa de la Reina de Fútbol.

In 2019, he was appointed head coach of Malaga for the 2019–20 season, taking charge of the team in La Liga Reto Iberdrola with a focus on long-term development and the promotion of women's football. A season later, he was appointed to lead Granada.

=== Costa Adeje Tenerife ===
In December 2021, he joined the Tenerife side back as an assistant coach. He took over as head coach of the club at the start of the 2023–24 season after serving as assistant coach the previous year, leading the team to a strong second half of the campaign.

On 15 June 2024, following the final league match against Real Betis, Herrera announced his departure after two seasons, as he was going to take over as head coach of Al Hilal's women's team in Saudi Women's Premier League.

=== Al Hilal ===
In July 2024, Al Hilal announced the appointment of Herrera as the manager of their women's team, signing a two-year contract. In his first month of the 2024–25 Saudi Women's Premier League, he led the team to two wins and one loss, earning him the October Manager of the Month award.

== Honours ==
=== Manager ===
Individual

- Saudi Women's Premier League Coach of the Month: October 2024, September 2025
