= Farida Hanafi =

Footballer (born 2005)

Personal information
- Full name: Farida Ashraf Mohamed Hanafi
- Date of birth: 7 December 2005 (age 20)
- Place of birth: Egypt
- Height: 1.62 m (5 ft 4 in)
- Positions: Defender; midfielder

Team information
- Current team: Al-Ahli
- Number: 14

Senior career*
Years	Team	Apps	(Gls)
2022–2023	Al-Shabab	9	(1)
2023–	Al-Ahli	37	(3)

International career^{‡}
2025–	Saudi Arabia	8	(0)
- * Club domestic league appearances and goals ‡ National team caps and goals as of 2 December 2025

Farida Ashraf Mohamed Hanafi (Arabic: فريدة أشرف محمد حنفي; born 7 December 2005) is an Egyptian naturalized Saudi professional footballer who plays as a defender for Saudi Women's Premier League side Al-Ahli and the Saudi Arabia national football team.

== Early life ==
Hanafi was born into a football-loving family and was first inspired to play the sport by her older brother. Supported by both parents, she trained regularly despite the absence of organized women's football in Saudi Arabia at the time. At the age of 13, she began individual training and later joined a girls' football academy, which included a development trip to Valencia, Spain.

== Club career ==
Following the establishment of the Saudi Women's Premier League, Hanafi joined the Riyadh-based club Al-Shabab. The 16-year-old defender made her debut in a 2–1 victory against Al-Ahli on 19 November 2022 and scored her first and only goal for the club in a 19–0 win over Sama on 11 February 2023.

Ahead of the 2023–24 season, she moved to Al-Ahli and made her debut on 14 October 2023 in the season opener against her former club Al-Shabab. She scored her first goal for Al-Ahli on 26 January 2024 in a 5–1 victory over Al-Hilal. On 2 September 2025, she renewed her contract until 2026.

== International career ==
After completing her naturalization and obtaining Saudi citizenship, she received her first call-up from head coach Lluís Cortés for the April training camp in Khobar. She made her senior international debut on 8 April 2025, starting in a 1–2 friendly defeat to Hong Kong.

== Career statistics ==
=== Club ===
As of 13 September 2025

Appearances and goals by club, season and competition
Club	Season	League			SAFF Cup		Other		Total	
Club	Season	Division	Apps	Goals	Apps	Goals	Apps	Goals	Apps	Goals
Al Shabab	2022–23	SWPL	9	1	—		—		9	1
Al-Ahli	2023–24	SWPL	12	1	3	0	—		15	1
Al-Ahli	2024–25	SWPL	16	1	4	0	—		20	1
Al-Ahli	2025–26	SWPL	1	0	—		2 (Note: Appearance(s) in Saudi Women's Super Cup)	0	3	0
Career total			38	3	7	0	1	0	47	3
