= Jaine Lemke =

Brazilian footballer (born 1998)

Personal information
- Full name: Jaine Fernanda Lemke
- Date of birth: 24 May 1998 (age 28)
- Place of birth: Arabutã, Santa Catarina, Brazil
- Position: Defender

Team information
- Current team: Al-Ula
- Number: 8

Youth career
- 2013–2016: Criciúma

Senior career*
Years	Team	Apps	(Gls)
2016	Juventus Jaragua	2	(0)
2017	Pé na Bola	6	(0)
2018–2019	Criciúma	12	(3)
2020–2021	AA Napoli	16	(0)
2022	Criciúma	2	(1)
2023	São José	4	(0)
2023–	Al-Ula	12	(8)
- * Club domestic league appearances and goals as of 12 September 2024

Jaine Fernanda Lemke (born 24 May 1998), simply known as Jaine, is a Brazilian professional footballer who plays as a defender for Al-Ula in the Saudi Women's Premier League.

== Club career ==
Born in Arabutã, in the West of Santa Catarina, Jaine Lemke left her hometown at the age of 14 after receiving an invitation to join Meninas Carvoeiras, the women's team of Criciúma Esporte Clube. She later played for São José and achieved success with AA Napoli, winning the Série A2 championship in Caçador. In 2022 She moved back to Criciúma.

In January 2023, São José signed Jaine from Criciúma.

On 8 November 2023, Jaine signed with the newly established Al-Ula in the Saudi Women's First Division League. There, she went on to win the league title, scoring in the semifinals and securing promotion to the Premier League.

== Honours ==
AA Napoli

- Campeonato Brasileiro de Futebol Feminino Série A2: 2020

Al-Ula

- Saudi Women's First Division League: 2023–24
