= Khattar =

Khatri and Jat surname

Khattar is a surname found among the Khatri of India and Pakistan.

== People ==
=== Indian people ===
- Ishaan Khattar (born 1995), Indian actor
- Jagdish Khattar (1942–2021), Indian bureaucrat and business executive
- Manohar Lal Khattar (born 1954), Indian politician and government minister, Chief Minister of Haryana 2014–2024
- Rajesh Khattar (born 1966), Indian actor
- Sahil Khattar (born 1991), Indian YouTuber
- Sat Pal Khattar (born 1942), Singaporean lawyer

=== Arabic people ===
- Abu'l-Khattar al-Husam ibn Darar al-Kalbi, 8th century Arab governor
- Nasri Khattar (1911–1988), Lebanese architect, creator of the Unified Arabic typeface
- Sara Al-Khatar (born 2000), Saudi footballer
- Tara Khattar (born 1992), Lebanese chef and writer
