= Sara Al-Khatar =

Saudi footballer (born 2000)

Personal information
- Full name: Sara Mohammad Al-Khatar
- Date of birth: 26 May 2000 (age 26)
- Place of birth: Saudi Arabia
- Position: Midfielder

Team information
- Current team: Al-Ahli
- Number: 66

Senior career*
Years	Team	Apps	(Gls)
2016–2019	United Eagles		
2020–2025	Eastern Flames		
2025–	Al-Ahli		
- * Club domestic league appearances and goals

Sara Mohammad Al-Khatar (Arabic: سارة محمد الخاطر; born 26 May 2000) is a Saudi Arabian footballer who plays as a midfielder for Saudi Women's Premier League club Al-Ahli.

== Club career ==
Sara Al-Khatar began playing with United Eagles.

In 2020, Al-Khatar moved to the Eastern Flames to play with them in the 2022–23 Saudi Women's Premier League, and continued with them for three consecutive seasons as team captain, she became one of the players who wore the captain's armband the most in the third edition of the. 2024–25 Saudi Women's Premier League.

In the summer of 2025, Al-Khatar moved to Al-Ahli to participate with them in the 2025–26 season of the Saudi Women's Premier League.
