= Nawras Al-Khaldi =

Saudi footballer (born 2000)

Nawras Al-Khaldi نورس الخالدي
Personal information
- Date of birth: 3 January 2000 (age 26)
- Place of birth: Saudi Arabia
- Position: Forward

Team information
- Current team: Al-Ula
- Number: 17

Senior career*
Years	Team	Apps	(Gls)
2024–	Al-Ula	2	(1)
- * Club domestic league appearances and goals as of 31 December 2024

Nawras Al-Khaldi (Arabic: نورس الخالدي; born 3 January 2000) is a Saudi professional footballer who plays as a forward for Saudi Women's Premier League club Al-Ula.

== Club career ==
=== Futsal ===
After the establishment of the Kuwaiti Women's Futsal League, Al-Khaldi played for Al-Oyoun Sports Club in the inaugural edition and won the Best Young Player award in the league.

In May 2024, She joined Al Qadsiah for the Saudi Women's Futsal tournament, where they clinched Bronze.

=== Al-Ula ===
In August 2024, Al-Ula announced the signing of al-Khaldi marking the start of her football path. On 13 December 2024, She made her debut for the club on a 6–2 win over Eastern Flames. in the following week, She scored her first goal and the only goal of the match in a famous win against Al-Hilal.

== Career statistics ==
=== Club ===
As of 18 January 2025

Appearances and goals by club, season and competition
Club	Season	League			SAFF Cup		Continental		Other		Total	
Club	Season	Division	Apps	Goals	Apps	Goals	Apps	Goals	Apps	Goals	Apps	Goals
Al-Ula	2024–25	Saudi WPL	4	3	1	0	—		—		5	1
Career total			4	3	1	0	—		—		5	1
