= Basmah Al-Shnaifi =

Saudi footballer (born 2009)

Personal information
- Full name: Basmah Nawaf Al-Shnaifi
- Date of birth: 23 April 2009 (age 17)
- Place of birth: Saudi Arabia
- Position: Midfielder

Team information
- Current team: Al-Nassr
- Number: 7

Youth career
- 2023–: Al-Nassr

Senior career*
Years	Team	Apps	(Gls)
2024–	Al-Nassr	11	(2)

International career
2023–	Saudi Arabia U17		(2)
2024–	Saudi Arabia U20		
- * Club domestic league appearances and goals

Basmah Nawaf Al-Shnaifi (Arabic: بسمة نواف الشنيفي; born 23 April 2009) is a Saudi footballer who plays as a Midfielder for Saudi Women's Premier League side Al-Nassr.

== Club career ==
Al-Shnaifi started playing with Al-Nassr (under 17) in the first edition of the SAFF Women's U-17 Tournament and she won the top scorer award.

In August 2024, Al-Nassr decided to promote Al-Shnaifi to the first team, to participate with them in the Marbella camp in Spain in preparation for the 2024–25 Saudi Women's Premier League.

On 25 August 2024, Al-Shnaifi played her first match with Al-Nassr in the 2024–25 AFC Women's Champions League against Myawady, playing the full 90 minutes.

On 11 November 2024, Al-Shnaifi scored her first league goal in a 5-1 win against Eastern Flames.

She made history as the youngest player ever to win the Saudi Women's Premier League in the 2024–25 season.

== International career ==
In February 2023, Al-Shnaifi was selected for the inaugural under-17 team to face Kuwait in double friendly matches. contributing to her team's first victory (3–2) by Scoring the third goal in the 41st minute. of the first half at Jaber Al-Ahmad International Stadium in Kuwait City.

On 2 March 2024, Al-Shnaifi joined the Saudi Arabia u-20 women's national football team with Scottish coach Pauline Hamill in preparation for the first international game against Mauritania.

== Honours ==
=== Al-Nassr ===
- Saudi Women's Premier League: 2024-25

Individual

- Saudi Women's Premier League Goal of the Week: 4th Round 2024, 7th Round 2024.
- Saudi Women's U-17 Tournament Top scorer: 2023–24
