= Dalal Abdullatif =

Saudi footballer (born 1994)

Dalal Abdullatif دلال عبد اللطيف
Personal information
- Full name: Dalal Abdulkarim Jamal Abdullatif
- Date of birth: 17 September 1994 (age 32)
- Place of birth: Saudi Arabia
- Position: Defender

Team information
- Current team: Al Qadsiah
- Number: 2

Senior career*
Years	Team	Apps	(Gls)
2016–2018	Riyadh Clubs		
2018–2021	Sama		
2022–2023	Al Yamamah		
2023–2024	Al-Shabab	12	(0)
2024–	Al Qadsiah	3	(0)

International career
2021–	Saudi Arabia Futsal		
2023–	Saudi Arabia	5	(0)
- * Club domestic league appearances and goals as of 12 October 2024

Dalal Abdulkarim Jamal Abdullatif (Arabic: دلال عبد الكريم جمال عبد اللطيف; born 17 September 1994) is a Saudi professional footballer who plays as a defender for saudi Women's Premier League club Al Qadsiah and the Saudi Arabia national team.

== Club career ==
Dalal previously played for Riyadh clubs from 2016 to 2018, Sama from 2018 to 2021, and Al Yamamah in 2022.

Abdullatif was playing for Al-Yamamah until Al-Shabab acquired the club in April 2023. Following the acquisition, Abdullatif signed with Al-Shabab in August 2023. On 26 July 2024, Al Shabab announced the departure of the defender.

On 30 July 2024, Al Qadsiah announced the signing of the defender for a one-season deal. On 14 October 2024, She was named in the team of the week during the third week of the 2024–25 season.

== International career ==
In December 2022, received her first call-up to the senior national football team, joining the Saudi Arabia squad for Khobar international friendly tournament. On 11 January 2023, she made her debut in a 1–0 victory against Mauritius.
