= Ayah Al-Majali =

Jordanian footballer (born 1992)

Personal information
- Full name: Ayah Faisal Ayed Al-Majali
- Date of birth: 9 March 1992 (age 34)
- Place of birth: Amman, Jordan
- Height: 1.79 m (5 ft 10 in)
- Position: Defender

Team information
- Current team: Al-Ula
- Number: 19

Senior career*
Years	Team	Apps	(Gls)
–2020	Shabab Al-Ordon		
2020–2021	Amman	6	(0)
2021	Konak Belediyespor	6	(0)
2021–2022	Etihad Club		
2022	Olimpia Cluj		
2022–2023	Al-Ittihad		
2023–2026	Al Ahli SFC		
2026–	Al-Ula		

International career^{‡}
	Jordan U19		(3)
2006–	Jordan	145	(7)
- * Club domestic league appearances and goals as of 16 January 2022 ‡ National team caps and goals as of 8 April 2025

Ayah Faisal Ayed Al-Majali (born 9 March 1992), known as Ayah Al-Majali (Arabic: آية المجالي), is a Jordanian footballer, who plays as a defender for the Saudi Women's Premier League club Al-Ula and the Jordan women's national team.

== Club career ==
Al-Majali played for the Women's League club Shabab Al-Ordon in her country, before she moved to Turkey to join the İzmir-based club Konak Belediyespor in the Turkcell Women's Super League.

== International goals ==
No.	Date	Venue	Opponent	Score	Result	Competition
1.	3 October 2011	Zayed Bin Sultan Stadium, Abu Dhabi, United Arab Emirates	Palestine	8–1	8–1	2011 WAFF Women's Championship
2.	5 October 2011	Zayed Bin Sultan Stadium, Abu Dhabi, United Arab Emirates	Bahrain	1–1	2–2	2011 WAFF Women's Championship
3.	7 October 2011	Zayed Bin Sultan Stadium, Abu Dhabi, United Arab Emirates	Iran	2–3	2–3	2011 WAFF Women's Championship
4.	19 April 2014	Petra Stadium, Amman, Jordan	Palestine	10–0	10–0	2014 WAFF Women's Championship
5.	8 November 2019	Faisal Al-Husseini International Stadium, Al-Ram, Palestine	Maldives	4–0	6–0	2020 AFC Women's Olympic Qualifying Tournament
6.	31 August 2021	Air Defense Stadium, Cairo, Egypt	Palestine	2–1	4–1	2021 Arab Women's Cup
7.	5 April 2023	Pakhtakor Stadium, Tashkent, Uzbekistan	Timor-Leste	1–0	3–1	2024 AFC Women's Olympic Qualifying Tournament
8.	19 February 2024	King Abdullah Sports City Reserve Stadium, Jeddah, Saudi Arabia	Saudi Arabia	3–1	3–1	2024 WAFF Women's Championship
9.	16 July 2025	King Abdullah II Stadium, Amman, Jordan	Bhutan	2–0	3–0	2026 AFC Women's Asian Cup qualification
10.	30 November 2025	Hall Stadium – King Abdullah Sports City, Jeddah, Saudi Arabia	Iraq	1–0	3–0	2025 WAFF Women's Championship
11.	2 December 2025	Prince Abdullah Al-Faisal Sports City Stadium, Jeddah, Saudi Arabia	Palestine	2–0	3–1	2025 WAFF Women's Championship
