= Shuruq Al-Hwsawi =

Saudi footballer (born 1994)

Personal information
- Full name: Shuruq Mohammed Zakrya Al-Hwsawi
- Date of birth: 25 November 1994 (age 31)
- Place of birth: Saudi Arabia
- Position: Right-back

Team information
- Current team: Al Hilal
- Number: 22

Senior career*
Years	Team	Apps	(Gls)
–2022	Challenge SC		
2022–	Al Hilal	33	(1)

International career
2023–	Saudi Arabia	7	(0)
- * Club domestic league appearances and goals

Shuruq Mohammed Zakrya Al-Hwsawi (Arabic: شروق محمد زكريا الهوساوي; born 25 November 1994) is a Saudi professional footballer who plays as a right-back for Saudi Women's Premier League club Al Hilal and the Saudi Arabia national team.

== Club career ==
Playing for the Challenge SC up to its acquisition by Al-Hilal, Al Hawsawi remained with the team after the takeover, She debuted for the team on 14 October 2022, As she started on a 4–2 win against Al-Shabab. On 16 December 2023, she scored her first goal for the club in a 4–2 win over Eastern Flames on a solo effort. On 7 October 2024, She was named in the team of the week of the second round in the 2024–25 season.

== International career ==
In December 2022, Shuruq received her first senior team call-up from head coach Monika Staab to take part in an International Friendly Tournament held in Khobar. She made her debut for Saudi Senior team On 13 June 2023, after she came as a substitute for Dalal Abdulatif in the 58th minute in a 3–1 loss to Andorra

== Career statistics ==
=== Club ===
As of match played 3 February 2024

Appearances and goals by club, season and competition
Club	Season	League			Cup		Continental		Other		Total	
Club	Season	Division	Apps	Goals	Apps	Goals	Apps	Goals	Apps	Goals	Apps	Goals
Al Hilal	2022–23	SWPL	14	0	–	–	—		—		14	0
Al Hilal	2023–24	SWPL	14	1	2	0	—		3	0	15	1
Al Hilal	Total		28	1	2	0	—		3	0	29	1
Career total			28	1	2	0	—		3	0	33	1

=== International ===
As of match played 8 January 2024

Appearances and goals by national team and year
National team	Year	Apps	Goals
Saudi Arabia	2023	6	0
Saudi Arabia	2024	1	0
Total		7	0

== Honours ==
Saudi Arabia

- SAFF Women's International Friendly Tournament winner: Khobar 2023
