= Sulaf Asiri =

Saudi footballer (born 2007)

Sulaf Aseeri
Personal information
- Full name: Sulaf Ahmed K. Aseeri
- Date of birth: 8 June 2007 (age 19)
- Position: Forward

Team information
- Current team: Al-Qadsiah
- Number: 15

Senior career*
Years	Team	Apps	(Gls)
2023–	Al-Qadsiah	21	(4)

International career^{‡}
2023–	Saudi Arabia U20	5	(0)
- * Club domestic league appearances and goals as of January 31, 2025 ‡ National team caps and goals as of December 6, 2024

Sulaf Ahmed K. Aseeri (Arabic: سلاف أحمد خ. عسيري; born 8 June 2007) is a Saudi professional soccer player who plays as a forward for Al Qadsiah of the Saudi Women's Premier League (SWPL). She was signed by Al Qadsiah at age 15 in 2023. She has represented the Saudi Arabia at the youth international level.

== Club career ==
Following Al Qadsiah's acquisition of Al-Mutahed, Sulaf was among the pioneers of the club's first-ever squad. She scored her first goal for the club during 2024–25 Saudi Women's Cup round of 16 against Al-Amal on 18 October 2024.

== International career ==
=== Youth ===
Following the establishment of the Saudi Arabia women's national under-20 football team in December 2023, Sulaf was named in the squad for the inaugural Riyadh camp. In November 2024, She was named for the U-18 squad for the 2024 WAFF U-18 Girls Championship in Aqaba, Jordan.

== Career statistics ==
=== Club ===
As of 31 January 2025

Appearances and goals by club, season and competition
Club	Season	League			Cup		Total	
Club	Season	Division	Apps	Goals	Apps	Goals	Apps	Goals
Al-Qadsiah	2023–24	SWPL	6	0	—		6	0
Al-Qadsiah	2024–25	SWPL	13	2	2	2	15	4
Career total			19	2	2	2	21	4

== Honors ==
Al Qadsiah

- Saudi Women's U-17 Tournament: 2024–25
