= Keikei =

Brazilian footballer (born 1995)

Personal information
- Full name: Keissyane Lima dos Santos
- Date of birth: 15 September 1995 (age 31)
- Place of birth: Rio de Janeiro, RJ, Brazil
- Height: 1.68 m (5 ft 6 in)
- Position: Goalkeeper

Team information
- Current team: Eastern Flames
- Number: 22

Senior career*
Years	Team	Apps	(Gls)
2016	Vasco da Gama	0	(0)
2016–2017	Flamengo	0	(0)
2018	3B da Amazônia	1	(0)
2018	Criciúma	3	(0)
2019	Grêmio	0	(0)
2019–2020	Palmeiras	0	(0)
2020–2024	Real Brasília	4	(0)
2024–	Eastern Flames	2	(0)
- * Club domestic league appearances and goals as of 5 October 2024

Keissyane Lima dos Santos (born 15 September 1995), simply known as Keikei, is a Brazilian professional footballer who plays as a goalkeeper for Saudi Women's Premier League side Eastern Flames.

== Early life ==
Keikei Born in Rio de Janeiro. From a young age, she showed a keen interest in football, watching both professional and amateur matches. Inspired by Cristiano Ronaldo, she initially played as a midfielder but transitioned to goalkeeper due to a lack of available players. Her coaches recognized her willingness to dive for the ball, and despite her shorter stature, she demonstrated good jumping ability, partly due to her background in capoeira.

== Career ==
Keikei played for Vasco's teams until 2016. Where she joined Flamengo at the beginning of the year.

In January 2019, She moved to Grêmio.

In 2022, She joined Real Brasília in Brasileirão Série A2.

On 25 September 2024, Eastern Flames announced the signing of Keikei on a one-year deal, valid until the end of the 2024–25 season.

== Honours ==
Flamengo

- Brasileirão Série A1: 2016
- Campeonato Carioca de Futebol Feminino: 2017

Palmeiras

- Copa Paulista de Futebol Feminino: 2019

Real Brasília

- Campeonato Brasiliense de Futebol Feminino: 2022, 2023
