= Ghaliah Emam =

Saudi Arabian footballer (born 1994)

Personal information
- Full name: Ghaliah Zakaria Bakr Emam
- Date of birth: 10 August 1994 (age 32)
- Place of birth: Saudi Arabia
- Position: Goalkeeper

Team information
- Current team: Al-Ahli
- Number: 34

Senior career*
Years	Team	Apps	(Gls)
2022–2023	Al-Shabab		
2023	Al-Taqadom		
2024–	Al-Ahli	15	(0)

International career^{‡}
2024–	Saudi Arabia	0	(0)
- * Club domestic league appearances and goals as of 14 December 2024 ‡ National team caps and goals as of 14 December 2024

Ghaliah Zakaria Bakr Emam (Arabic: غالية زكريا بكر إمام; born 10 August 1994) is a Saudi Arabian professional footballer who plays as a goalkeeper for Saudi Women's Premier League club Al-Ahli and the Saudi Arabia national team.

== Club career ==
=== Al-Ahli ===
Since joining Al-Ahli, she has been the team's starting goalkeeper, playing the majority of the second half of the 2023–24 season. She played a key role in helping Al-Ahli secure the Saudi Women's Cup.

In December 2024, she was awarded the Goalkeeper of the Month for November, following a series of outstanding performances during the season.

== International career ==
In November 2024, Ghaliah received her first national team call-up for the Doha camp to play friendly matches against Palestine and Pakistan.
