= Chinonyerem Macleans =

Nigerian footballer (born 1999)

Personal information
- Date of birth: 1 October 1999 (age 27)
- Place of birth: Aba, Nigeria
- Height: 1.65 m (5 ft 5 in)
- Position: Forward

Team information
- Current team: Al-Shabab
- Number: 25

Senior career*
Years	Team	Apps	(Gls)
- Abia Angels
2015–2020	Bayelsa Queens	36	(29)
2020	Bobruichanka	10	(8)
2021	Stomilanki Olsztyn	10	(11)
2021–2022	Górnik Łęczna	22	(20)
2022–2024	Lokomotiv Moscow	33	(14)
2024–	Al-Shabab	5	(4)

International career^{‡}
2022–	Nigeria	2	(0)
- * Club domestic league appearances and goals as of 26 November 2024 ‡ National team caps and goals as of 31 July 2024

Chinonyerem Macleans (born 1 October 1999) is a Nigerian professional footballer who plays for Saudi Women's Premier League club Al-Shabab and the Nigeria national team.

== Club career ==
In the summer of 2020, she departed Bayelsa Queens to join the 11-time champions, Bobruichanka Bobruisk, in the Belarusian league.

On 30 November 2020, Stomilanki Olsztyn announced the signing of Macleans. In August 2021, she moved to fellow Polish side Górnik Łęczna.

After one season in the Polish top-flight, she departed Górnik to join clubs in more competitive leagues.

=== Lokomotiv Moscow ===
In the summer of 2022, she joined Russian Women's Football Championship defending champions Lokomotiv Moscow. In the first four rounds of the championship, she made a significant impact, scoring five goals, and was voted the Best Player of the Month for March by the fans. In the following match, she was named Player of the Match, continuing her impressive form.

In August 2024, she has ended her two-year stint with the Russian club.

=== Al-Shabab ===
On 1 October 2024, Saudi Women's Premier League side Al-Shabab announced the signing of the forward.

== International career ==
In June 2022, MacLeans received her first call-up to the Nigeria women's national football team for the 2022 Women's Africa Cup of Nations. On 7 July 2022, she made her debut for the team, coming on as a substitute for Ifeoma Onumonu in the 83rd minute.

On 3 July 2024, Macleans was included on the roster for Nigeria at the 2024 Summer Olympics.

== Honours ==
Individual

- Ekstraliga top scorer: 2021–22
