= Mayara Gonçalves =

Brazilian footballer (born 1998)

Personal information
- Full name: Mayara Gonçalves Santana
- Date of birth: 24 June 1998 (age 28)
- Place of birth: Rio de Janeiro, Brazil
- Position: Goalkeeper

Team information
- Current team: Al-Taraji
- Number: 22

Senior career*
Years	Team	Apps	(Gls)
2015	Duque de Caxias	3	(0)
2016	Vasco	20	(0)
2017	Vitória das Tabocas	0	(0)
2017	Penarol	6	(0)
2018	São Francisco-BA	5	(0)
2019	AD Lusaca	2	(0)
2019–2020	Ceará	19	(0)
2021	Botafogo	2	(0)
2022	Al Ain	8	
2022–2023	Al Hilal	6	(0)
2023–	Al-Taraji	29	(0)
- * Club domestic league appearances and goals

Mayara Gonçalves Santana (born 24 June 1998), simply known as Mayara, is a Brazilian professional footballer who plays as a goalkeeper for Al-Taraji in the Saudi Women's Premier League.

== Cub career ==
In 2017, Gonçalves played for Penarol.

In February 2021, Botafogo announced the signing of Mayara ahead of the 2021 Brasileirão Feminino A1. She made her debut as a starter for the team on 6 February 2021 in an 11–1 win against Angra Dos Reis in the Campeonato Carioca de Futebol.

In December 2022, Saudi Women's Premier League side Al Hilal announced the signing of Mayara from Emirati club Al Ain. On 30 December 2022, She debuted for the club in a 6–3 win over Al Nassr.

Ahead of the second edition of the Saudi Women's First Division League, she joined Al-Taraji, making her debut on 9 November 2023 in a 23–0 victory over Ras Tanuara. Her performance was crucial in guiding the team to the league final, securing their promotion to the Premier League for the 2024–25 season. In June 2024, Her contract was renewed for another season.

== Honours ==
- Campeonato Carioca de Futebol: 2020–21
