= Arabutã =

- Municipality
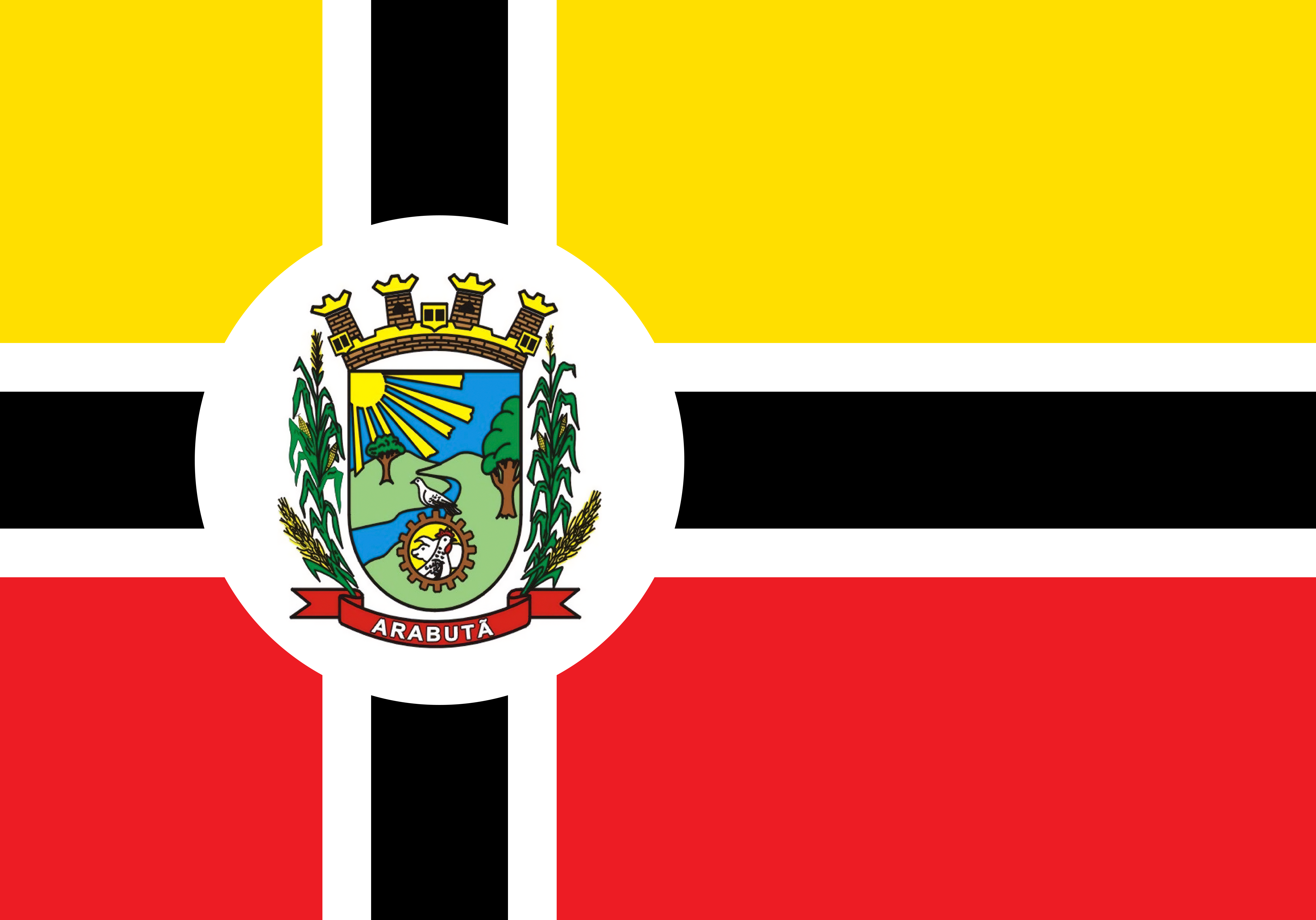
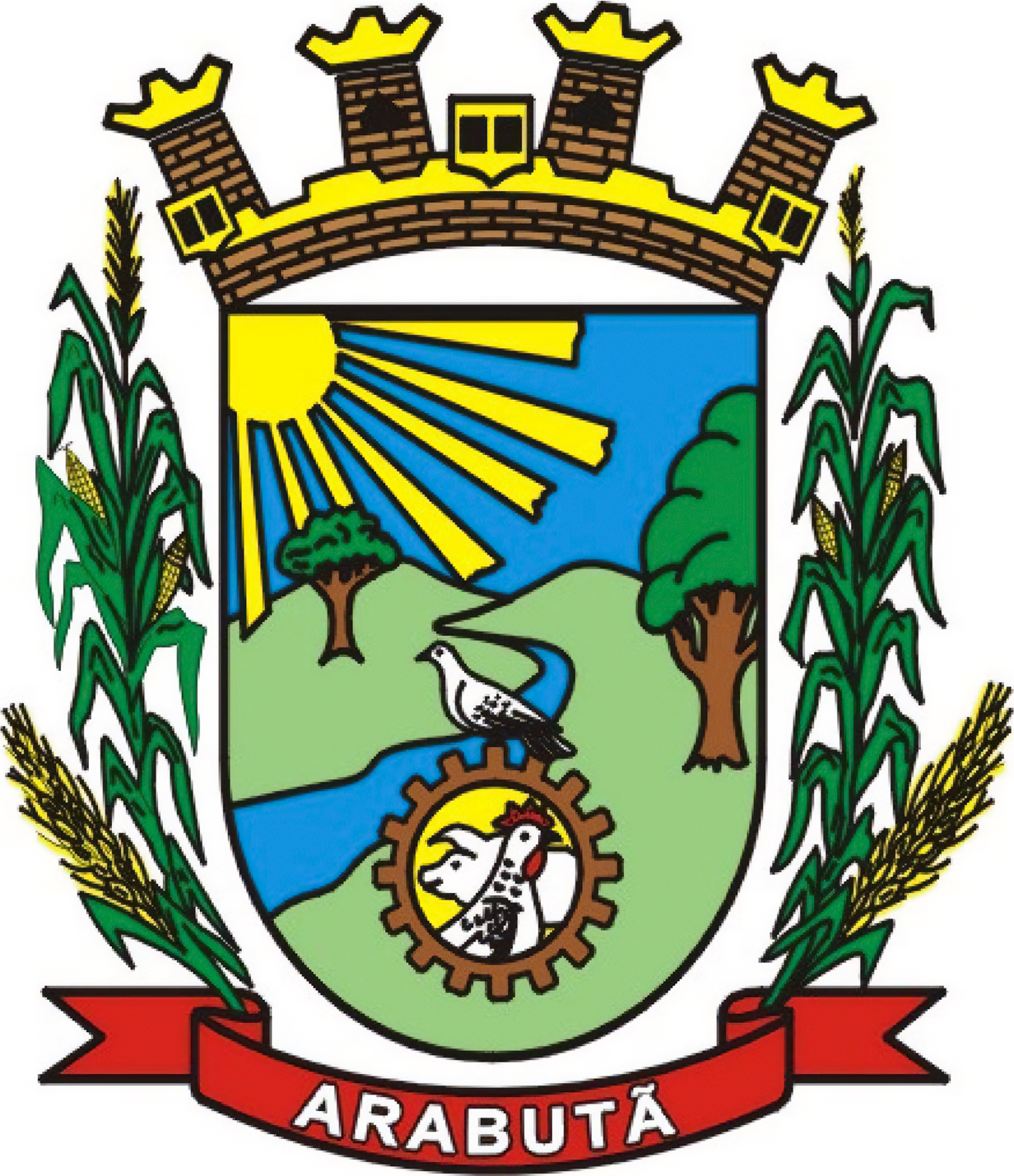
- Flag Coat of arms

- Location in Brazil
- Coordinates: 27°10′S 52°07′W
- Country: Brazil
- Region: South
- State: Santa Catarina
- Mesoregion: Oeste Catarinense

Population (2020)
  - Total: 4,267
- Time zone: UTC−3 (BRT)
- Website: www.arabuta.sc.gov.br

Arabutã is a municipality in the state of Santa Catarina in the South region of Brazil.

== See also ==
- List of municipalities in Santa Catarina
