= Dona Rajab =

Saudi Arabian football manager

Dona Rajab (Arabic: دنى رجب) is a Saudi Arabian football manager who is the assistant manager of Saudi Arabia women's national football team.

== Early life ==
Rajab started playing football at the age of nine. She grew up in the United States.

== Career ==
Rajab has managed Saudi Arabian side Al Shabab. After that, she was appointed assistant manager of the Saudi Arabia women's national football team.

== Personal life ==
Rajab obtained the AFC A Coaching License. She was described as "one of the first women from the country to obtain [the license]".
