= Tuani Lemos =

Brazilian footballer

Personal information
- Full name: Tuani Lemos Ramos
- Date of birth: 19 January 1991 (age 35)
- Place of birth: Porto Alegre, Rio Grande do Sul, Brazil
- Height: 1.70 m (5 ft 7 in)
- Position: Defender

Team information
- Current team: Al-Ula
- Number: 3

Youth career
- 2007–2008: Internacional

Senior career*
Years	Team	Apps	(Gls)
2012–2014	Kindermann	20	(5)
2016	Ferroviária	10	(0)
2017–2021	Kindermann/Avaí	85	(3)
2022–2023	Grêmio	31	(0)
2023–	Al-Ula	12	(5)

International career
2008	Brazil U17	+3	(0)
2012–2017	Brazil Universiade	17	(1)
2017	Brazil	0	(0)
- * Club domestic league appearances and goals as of 21:49, 14 September 2024 (UTC)

Tuani Lemos Ramos (born 19 January 1991) is a Brazilian professional footballer who plays as Defender for Al-Ula in the Saudi Women's Premier League and the Brazil national team.

== Club career ==
In February 2012, Lemos joined Kindermann.

In January 2016, she moved to Ferroviária.

Returning to Kindermann in 2017, Lemos helped the team reach the finals of the 2020 Série A1, where they finished as runners-up. A year later she participated in the 2020 Copa Libertadores Femenina with the club.

In January 2022, Grêmio announced the signing of Tuani from Kindermann. On 7 December 2022, the club renewed its contract for another season. On 13 September 2023, Grêmio announced Lemos' departure.

On 31 October 2023, Lemos joined Al-Ula in the Saudi Women's First Division League for her first time playing outside Brazil. She scored 5 goals in her twelve appearances, including a brace in the semifinal against Al-Amal, helping the club reach the final, secure promotion, and ultimately win the championship.

== International career ==
Lemos has represented Brazil at the youth level, playing for both the under-17 and under-20 teams. She was included in Brazil's final squad for the 2008 South American U-17 Women's Championship and 2008 FIFA U-17 Women's World Cup.

In February 2017, she was called to the Brazilian senior team for a training camp.

She represented the Brazilian university national team in the Universiade Games in 2013, 2015 and 2017.

== Honours ==
Brazil U-17

- South American U-17 Women's Championship
  - (silver) Runner-up: 2008

Brazil Universiade

- Summer Universiade
  - (gold) Winner: 2017
  - (bronze) Third place: 2013

Kindermann/Avaí

- Campeonato Brasileiro de Futebol Feminino Série A1
  - (silver) Runner-up: 2014, 2020
- Campeonato Catarinense de Futebol Feminino
  - (gold) Winner: 2018, 2019, 2021
- Copa do Brasil de Futebol Feminino
  - (gold) Winner: 2015

Grêmio

- Campeonato Gaúcho de Futebol Feminino
  - (gold) Winner: 2022
  - (silver) Runner-up: 2023
- Supercopa do Brasil de Futebol Feminino
  - (silver) Runner-up: 2022

Al-Ula

- Saudi Women's First Division League
  - (gold) Winner: 2023–24
