= Ibtissam Jraïdi =

Moroccan footballer

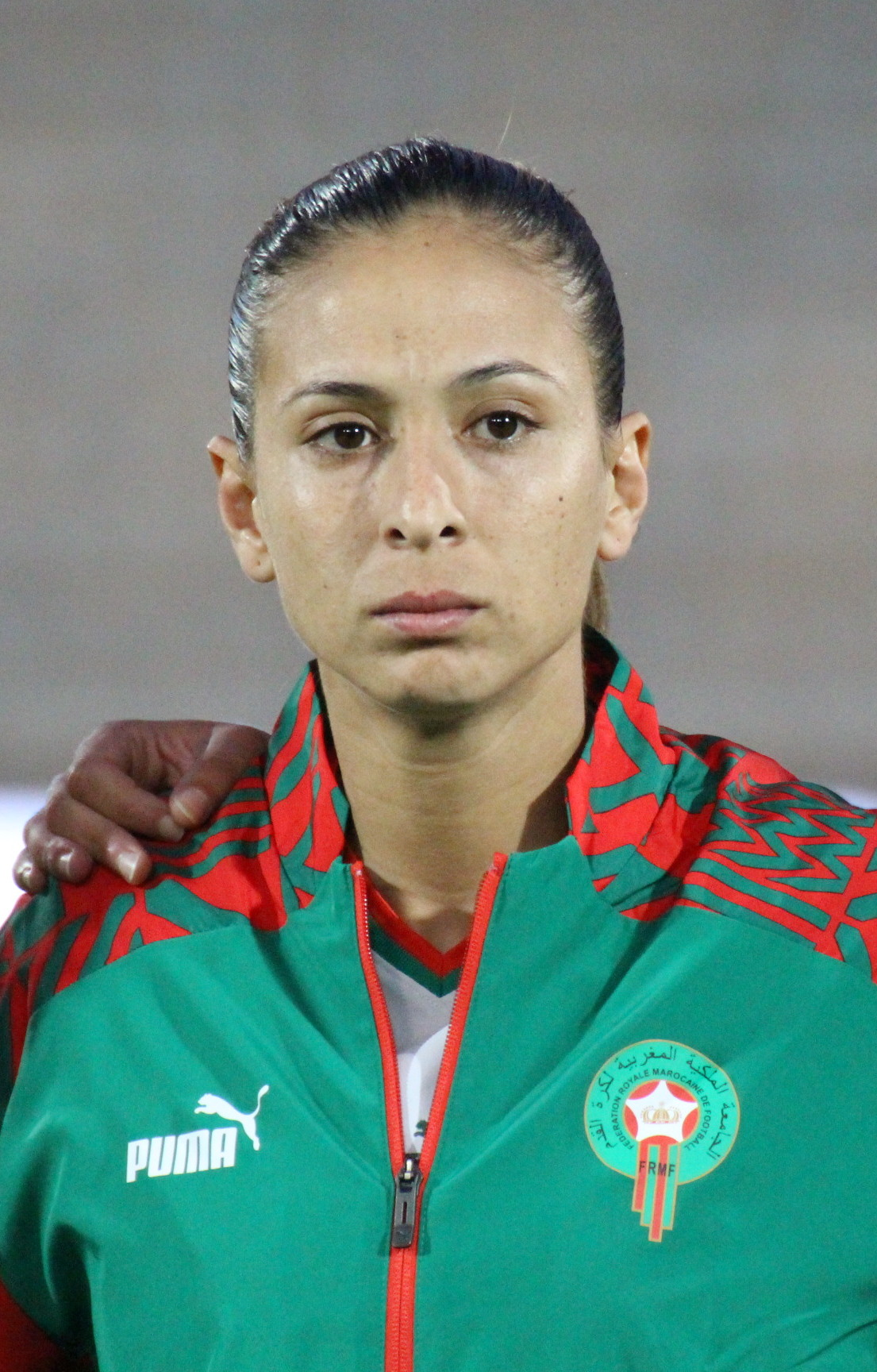
- Jraïdi in 2023

Personal information
- Date of birth: 9 December 1992 (age 33)
- Place of birth: Casablanca, Morocco
- Height: 1.65 m (5 ft 5 in)
- Position: Forward

Team information
- Current team: Al-Hilal

Youth career
- 2008–2012: Nassim Sidi Moumen

Senior career*
Years	Team	Apps	(Gls)
2012–2023	AS FAR	88	(141)
2023–2026	Al Ahli	50	(74)
2026–	Al Hilal	3	(3)

International career
2009–	Morocco	32	(45)
Medal record
Representing Morocco
UNAF Women's Tournament
Winner	2020 Tunisia
Women's Africa Cup of Nations
Runner-up	2022 Morocco
Runner-up	2024 Morocco
- * Club domestic league appearances and goals

Ibtissam Jraïdi (Arabic: إبتسام جرايدي; born 9 December 1992) is a Moroccan professional footballer who plays as a forward for Saudi Women's Premier League club Al-Hilal, which she captains, and the Morocco women's national team. She was the first Moroccan and Arab player to score at the FIFA Women's World Cup.

== Early life ==
Jraïdi began playing football at the age of 7 on neighborhood teams. She then played in her school tournament. She received support from her family to play football.

== Club career ==
Jraïdi played for Nassim Sidi Moumen before joining AS FAR in 2012. With AS FAR, she won the Moroccan Championship nine times, and the Throne Cup eight times. She was the top scorer in the league four times: 2017–18, 2019–20, 2020–21, and 2021–22. In 2022, she won the CAF Champions League with AS FAR after finishing third in 2021. She was the top scorer in the tournament, scoring six goals including a hat trick in the final.

In 2023, Jraïdi joined Al Ahli SFC on a two-year deal for the debut season of the Saudi Women's Premier League. She finished second in the Golden Boot standings, despite arriving midway through the 2022–23 season.

On 14 November 2023, Jraidi was nominated for the 2023 African Player of the Year by CAF.

== International career ==
Jraïdi capped for Morocco at senior level during the 2018 Africa Women Cup of Nations qualification (first round). She played for Morocco during their runners-up performance in the 2022 Women's Africa Cup of Nations. On 30 July 2023, she scored Morocco's first ever FIFA Women's World Cup goal in a 1–0 win over South Korea, also the first win for the nation in the competition.

== Career statistics ==
=== Club ===
Club	Season	League			National cup (Note: Includes Saudi Women's Cup)		Continental		Other		Total	
Club	Season	Division	Apps	Goals	Apps	Goals	Apps	Goals	Apps	Goals	Apps	Goals
AS FAR	2016-17	Moroccan Women D1	21	39							21	39
AS FAR	2019-20	Moroccan Women D1	20	35							20	35
AS FAR	2020-21	Moroccan Women D1	21	36			2	6			23	42
AS FAR	2021-22	Moroccan Women D1	26	31			5	6			31	37
AS FAR	Total		88	141			7	12			95	153
Al Ahli	2022–23	SWPL	7	17	—				—		7	17
Al Ahli	2023–24	SWPL	13	17	4	14			—		17	31
Al Ahli	2024–25	SWPL	18	26	4	9			—		22	35
Al Ahli	2025–26	SWPL	12	14	2	0			6 (Note: two appearance and two goal in Saudi Women's Super Cup, four appearance and five goal in Saudi Women's Challenge Cup)	7	20	20
Al Ahli	Total		50	74	10	23			6	7	66	104
Al Hilal	2026–27	SWPL	3	3	0	0			2 (Note: two appearance in Saudi Women's Super Cup)	0	5	3
Total			141	218	10	23	7	12	8	7	166	260

== International goals ==
No.	Date	Venue	Opponent	Score	Result	Competition
1.	14 January 2012	Rabat, Morocco	Tunisia	1–0	2–0	2012 African Women's Championship qualification
2.	25 November 2015	Salé, Morocco	Egypt	1–0	3–0	Friendly
3.	19 March 2016	Stade Boubker Ammar, Salé, Morocco	Mali	1–0	1–2	2016 Women's Africa Cup of Nations qualification
4.	3 March 2018	Tanger, Morocco	Luxembourg	1–0	7–1	Friendly
5.	3 March 2018	Tanger, Morocco	Luxembourg	2–0	7–1	Friendly
6.	14 March 2018	Yenne, Senegal	Senegal	1–0	3–2	Friendly
7.	18 October 2018	Kenitra Municipal Stadium, Kenitra, Morocco	Algeria	1–1	3–1	Friendly
8.	18 October 2018	Kenitra Municipal Stadium, Kenitra, Morocco	Algeria	2–1	3–1	Friendly
9.	7 April 2019	Stade Boubker Ammar, Salé, Morocco	Mali	1–0	2–2	2020 CAF Women's Olympic Qualifying Tournament
10.	7 April 2019	Stade Boubker Ammar, Salé, Morocco	Mali	2–1	2–2	2020 CAF Women's Olympic Qualifying Tournament
11.	31 January 2020	Stade Municipal de Témara, Temara, Morocco	Tunisia	5–2	6–3	Friendly
12.	31 January 2020	Stade Municipal de Témara, Temara, Morocco	Tunisia	6–3	6–3	Friendly
13.	22 February 2020	El Kram Stadium, Le Kram, Tunisia	Algeria	2–0	2–0	2020 UNAF Women's Tournament
14.	30 July 2023	Hindmarsh Stadium, Adelaide, Australia	South Korea	1–0	1–0	2023 FIFA Women's World Cup
15.	28 February 2024	Moulay El Hassan Stadium, Rabat, Morocco	Tunisia	2–0	4–1	2024 CAF Women's Olympic Qualifying Tournament
16.	28 February 2024	Moulay El Hassan Stadium, Rabat, Morocco	Tunisia	3–0	4–1	2024 CAF Women's Olympic Qualifying Tournament
17.	28 February 2024	Moulay El Hassan Stadium, Rabat, Morocco	Tunisia	4–0	4–1	2024 CAF Women's Olympic Qualifying Tournament
18.	30 May 2024	Berkane Municipal Stadium, Berkane, Morocco	DR Congo	2–1	2–1	Friendly
19.	3 June 2024	Berkane Municipal Stadium, Berkane, Morocco	DR Congo	1–1	3–2	Friendly
20.	3 June 2024	Berkane Municipal Stadium, Berkane, Morocco	DR Congo	2–1	3–2	Friendly
21.	3 June 2024	Berkane Municipal Stadium, Berkane, Morocco	DR Congo	3–1	3–2	Friendly
22.	25 October 2024	Père Jégo Stadium, Casablanca, Morocco	Tanzania	1–0	4–1	Friendly
23.	29 October 2024	Père Jégo Stadium, Casablanca, Morocco	Senegal	1–0	7–0	Friendly
24.	29 October 2024	Père Jégo Stadium, Casablanca, Morocco	Senegal	5–0	7–0	Friendly
25.	28 November 2024	Saniat Rmel Stadium, Tétouan, Morocco	Botswana	1–0	3–1	Friendly
26.	28 November 2024	Saniat Rmel Stadium, Tétouan, Morocco	Botswana	3–0	3–1	Friendly
27.	3 December 2024	Saniat Rmel Stadium, Tétouan, Morocco	Mali	1–0	1–0	Friendly
28.	15 June 2025	Mohamed VI Football Complex, Salé, Morocco	Cape Verde	1–0	1–0	Friendly
29.	19 June 2025	Kenitra Municipal Stadium, Kenitra, Morocco	Malawi	3–2	4–2	Friendly
30.	28 June 2025	Prince Moulay Abdellah Stadium, Rabat. Morocco	Tanzania	1–0	4–0	Friendly
31.	5 July 2025	Rabat Olympic Stadium, Rabat, Morocco	Zambia	1–1	2–2	2024 Women's Africa Cup of Nations
32.	18 July 2025	Rabat Olympic Stadium, Rabat, Morocco	Mali	1–0	3–1	2024 Women's Africa Cup of Nations
33.	18 July 2025	Rabat Olympic Stadium, Rabat, Morocco	Mali	2–0	3–1	2024 Women's Africa Cup of Nations
34.	28 October 2025	Père Jégo Stadium, Casablanca, Morocco	Haiti	3–0	3–0	Friendly
35.	28 November 2025	Marrakesh Stadium, Marrakesh, Morocco	Burkina Faso	1–0	1–1	Friendly
36.	27 February 2026	Al Medina Stadium, Rabat, Morocco	Burkina Faso	3–0	5–0	Friendly
37.	27 February 2026	Al Medina Stadium, Rabat, Morocco	Burkina Faso	5–0	5–0	Friendly
38.	7 April 2026	Moulay El Hassan Stadium, Rabat, Morocco	Cape Verde	2–0	3–0	Friendly
39.	17 April 2026	Moulay El Hassan Stadium, Rabat, Morocco	Mali	1–1	1–1	Friendly
40.	5 June 2026	Moulay El Hassan Stadium, Rabat, Morocco	Benin	1–0	4–2	Friendly
41.	26 July 2026	Moulay El Hassan Stadium, Rabat, Morocco	Kenya	3–0	4–0	2026 Women's Africa Cup of Nations
42.	26 July 2026	Moulay El Hassan Stadium, Rabat, Morocco	Kenya	4–0	4–0	2026 Women's Africa Cup of Nations
43.	9 October 2026	Moulay El Hassan Stadium, Rabat, Morocco	Uzbekistan	1–1	3–1	Friendly
44.	9 October 2026	Moulay El Hassan Stadium, Rabat, Morocco	Uzbekistan	2–1	3–1	Friendly
45.	9 October 2026	Moulay El Hassan Stadium, Rabat, Morocco	Uzbekistan	3–1	3–1	Friendly

== Honours ==
AS FAR

- Moroccan Women's Championship (9): 2013, 2014, 2016, 2017, 2018, 2019, 2020, 2021, 2022
- Moroccan Women Throne Cup (8): 2013, 2014, 2015, 2016, 2017, 2018, 2019, 2020
- UNAF Women's Champions League (1): 2021
- CAF Women's Champions League (1): 2022; third place: 2021

Al-Ahli

- SAFF Women's Cup (2): 2023–24, 2024–25
- Saudi Women's Premier League runner-up: 2023–24, 2024–25, 2025–26

Morocco

- Women's Africa Cup of Nations runner-up: 2022, 2024
- UNAF Women's Tournament: 2020

Individual

- Moroccan Women's Championship Best Player: 2016
- Moroccan Women's Championship top scorer: 2016, 2018, 2020, 2021, 2022
- UNAF Women's Champions League top scorer: 2021
- CAF Women's Champions League top scorer: 2022
- CAF Women's Champions League Team of the Tournament: 2022
- Women's Africa Cup of Nations Team of the Tournament: 2024
- IFFHS CAF Women's Team of The Year: 2022
- SAFF Women's Cup top scorer: 2023–24, 2024–25.
- Saudi Women's Premier League top scorer: 2023–24, 2024–25.
- Saudi Women's Premier League Team of the Season: 2023–24, 2024–25, 2025–26
- UMFP Best Moroccan player abroad of the Year: 2023–24, 2024–25

== See also ==
- List of Morocco women's international footballers
