= Sawaher Asseri =

Saudi footballer (born 1995)

Personal information
- Full name: Sawaher Ayel Asseri
- Date of birth: 17 February 1995 (age 31)
- Place of birth: Saudi Arabia
- Position: Defender

Team information
- Current team: Al-Ahli
- Number: 22

Senior career*
| Years | Team | Apps | (Gls) |
| 2021–2022 | Miras | | |
| 2022– | Al-Ahli | | |
- * Club domestic league appearances and goals

Sawaher Ayel Asseri (Arabic: سواهر عائل عسيري; born 17 February 1995) is a Saudi footballer who plays as a defender for Saudi Women's Premier League side Al-Ahli.

== Club career ==
Sawaher started playing with the Miras team in the attacking position

Since Al-Ahly acquired Miras in 2022, Sawaher has played as a Right-back in Saudi Women's Premier League matches

In the following season, 2023/2024, of the Saudi Women's Premier League and SAFF Women's Cup, Jordanian coach Manar Freij relied on Sawaher in the left-back position

== Honours ==
=== Club ===
Al-Ahli

- SAFF Women's Cup:

(gold) Champion: 2023–24
