= Letícia Nunes =

Brazilian footballer (born 2001)

Personal information
- Full name: Letícia Oliveira Nunes
- Date of birth: 5 December 2001 (age 24)
- Place of birth: Belo Horizonte, Brazil
- Height: 1.67 m (5 ft 6 in)
- Position: Midfielder

Team information
- Current team: Al-Ittihad
- Number: 9

Youth career
- 2019: Cruzeiro

Senior career*
Years	Team	Apps	(Gls)
2019–2021	Cruzeiro	1	(0)
2020	→ Athletico	4	(0)
2021–2022	Ipatinga	7	(1)
2022–2024	América	21	(16)
2024	Bahia	12	(4)
2024–	Al-Ittihad	2	(2)
- * Club domestic league appearances and goals as of 7 September 2024

Letícia Oliveira Nunes (born 5 December 2001) is a Brazilian professional footballer who plays as a midfielder for Saudi Women's Premier League club Al-Ittihad.

== Club career ==
On 10 October 2020, she was loaned to Athletico for a one-season deal to gain experience.

She left the club on 5 January 2021 after her contract was not renewed.

On 4 September 2022, América announced the signing of Letícia on a one-season deal.

On 23 January 2024, she joined Bahia ahead of their Serie A2 2024 season. She played a key role in the team's promotion to Serie A, scoring 4 goals in 12 matches.

=== Al-Ittihad ===
On 25 August 2024, Bahia confirmed the transfer of Letícia to Saudi club Al-Ittihad. On 27 August 2024, she made her debut for the club in a 0–2 defeat against Barcelona B. She scored her first goal for the team on 4 September 2024, scoring in the 55th minute in a 3–1 loss to Espanyol.

== Honours ==
Bahia

- Campeonato Brasileiro de Futebol Feminino Série A2: 2024.
