= Melisa Hasanbegović =

Bosnian footballer

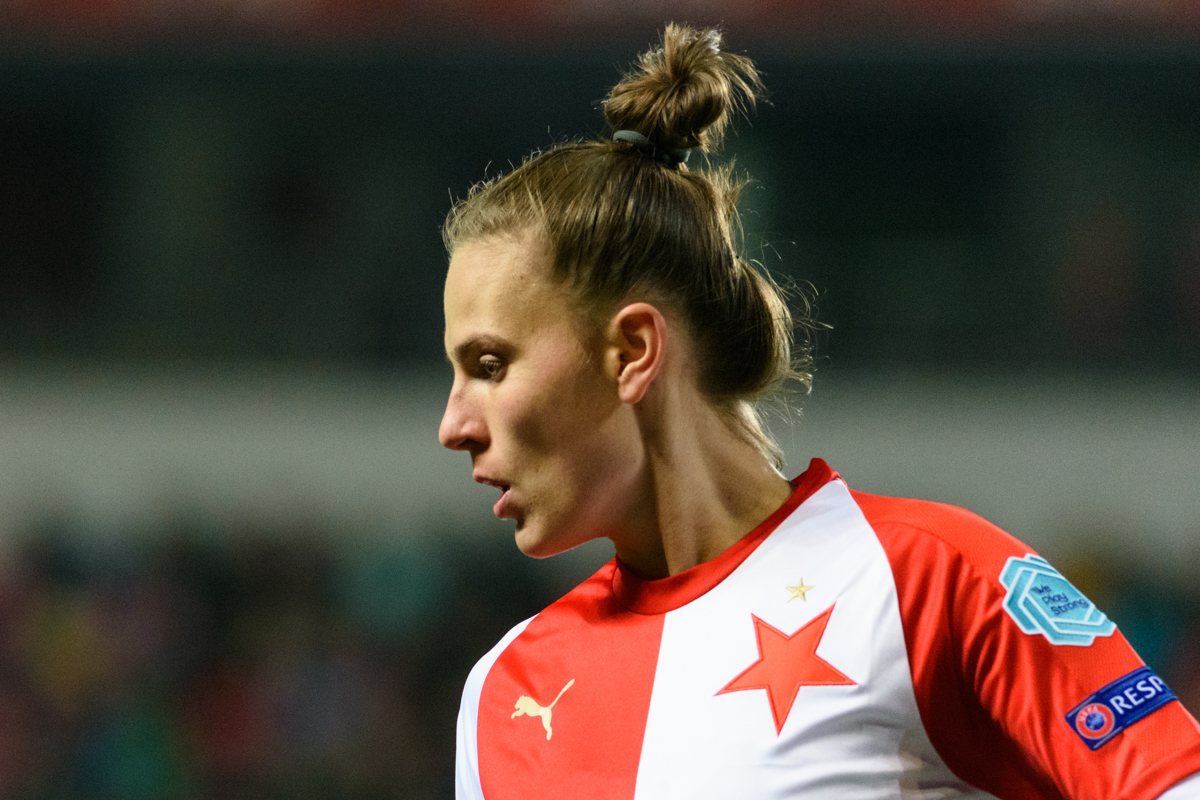
- Hasanbegović with Slavia Prague in 2019

Personal information
- Date of birth: 13 April 1995 (age 31)
- Place of birth: Velika Kladuša, Bosnia and Herzegovina
- Height: 1.79 m (5 ft 10 in)
- Position: Defender

Team information
- Current team: Al-Ula
- Number: 26

Senior career*
Years	Team	Apps	(Gls)
2012–2017	SFK 2000		
2017	Kvarnsvedens IK	18	(0)
2018	IK Grand Bodø	9	(1)
2019	Slavia Prague	10	(1)
2019–2021	Ferencváros	17	(3)
2021–2023	Sporting CP	17	(0)
2023–2024	SC Braga		
2024–	Al-Ula	6	(0)

International career^{‡}
2011	Bosnia and Herzegovina U17	3	(0)
2011–2013	Bosnia and Herzegovina U19	9	(1)
2014–	Bosnia and Herzegovina	29	(2)
- * Club domestic league appearances and goals as of 17 February 2023 ‡ National team caps and goals as of 17 February 2023

Melisa Hasanbegović (born 13 April 1995) is a Bosnian footballer who plays as a defender for Saudi Women's Premier League club Al-Ula.

Previously she played for SFK 2000, IK Grand Bodø, SK Slavia Prague, and Ferencváros, In addition, she represented Sporting CP and SC Braga in the Campeonato Nacional Feminino in Portugal.

== Career statistics ==
No.	Date	Venue	Opponent	Score	Result	Competition
1.	5 April 2014	Tórsvøllur, Tórshavn, Faroe Islands	Faroe Islands	1–0	1–1	2015 FIFA Women's World Cup qualification
2.	30 August 2019	Bosnia and Herzegovina FA Training Centre, Zenica, Bosnia and Herzegovina	Georgia	2–0	7–1	UEFA Women's Euro 2022 qualifying
3.	17 September 2021	Bosnia and Herzegovina FA Training Centre, Zenica, Bosnia and Herzegovina	Montenegro	1–2	2–3	2023 FIFA Women's World Cup qualification
4.	17 February 2023	Alanya, Turkey	Serbia	1–0	2–3	Friendly
5.	7 March 2026	Bosnia and Herzegovina FA Training Centre, Zenica, Bosnia and Herzegovina	Liechtenstein	5–1	13–1	2027 FIFA Women's World Cup qualification
6.	9 June 2026	Pärnu Rannastaadion, Pärnu, Estonia	Estonia	1–1	1–1	2027 FIFA Women's World Cup qualification
