= Nadiyah Al-Dhidan =

Saudi Arabian footballer (born 1998)

Nadiyah Al-Dhidan نادية حماد
Personal information
- Full name: Nadiyah Hamad Saleh Al-Dhidan
- Date of birth: 26 March 1998 (age 28)
- Place of birth: Saudi Arabia
- Position: Forward

Team information
- Current team: Al-Ula
- Number: 20

Senior career*
Years	Team	Apps	(Gls)
–2022	Challenge		
2022–2024	Al Hilal	26	(0)
2024–	Al-Ula	3	(1)
- * Club domestic league appearances and goals as of 11 October 2024

Nadiyah Hamad Saleh Al-Dhidan (Arabic: نادية حماد صالح الضيدان; born 26 March 1998) is a Saudi professional footballer who plays as a forward for Saudi Women's Premier League club Al-Ula.

== Club career ==
Nadiyah played for Challenge Women's Football Club before its acquisition by Al Hilal, and continued with Al Hilal after the takeover.

In August 2023, Al-Ula announced the signing of winger and striker Nadiyah from Al Hilal to strengthen its local squad ahead of their Premier League debut. On 27 September 2024, She made her debut as a starter in a 3–1 loss to defending champions Al Nassr. On 5 October 2024, She scored her first goal for the club, which was also voted the goal of the round.
