= Zala Meršnik =

Slovenian footballer

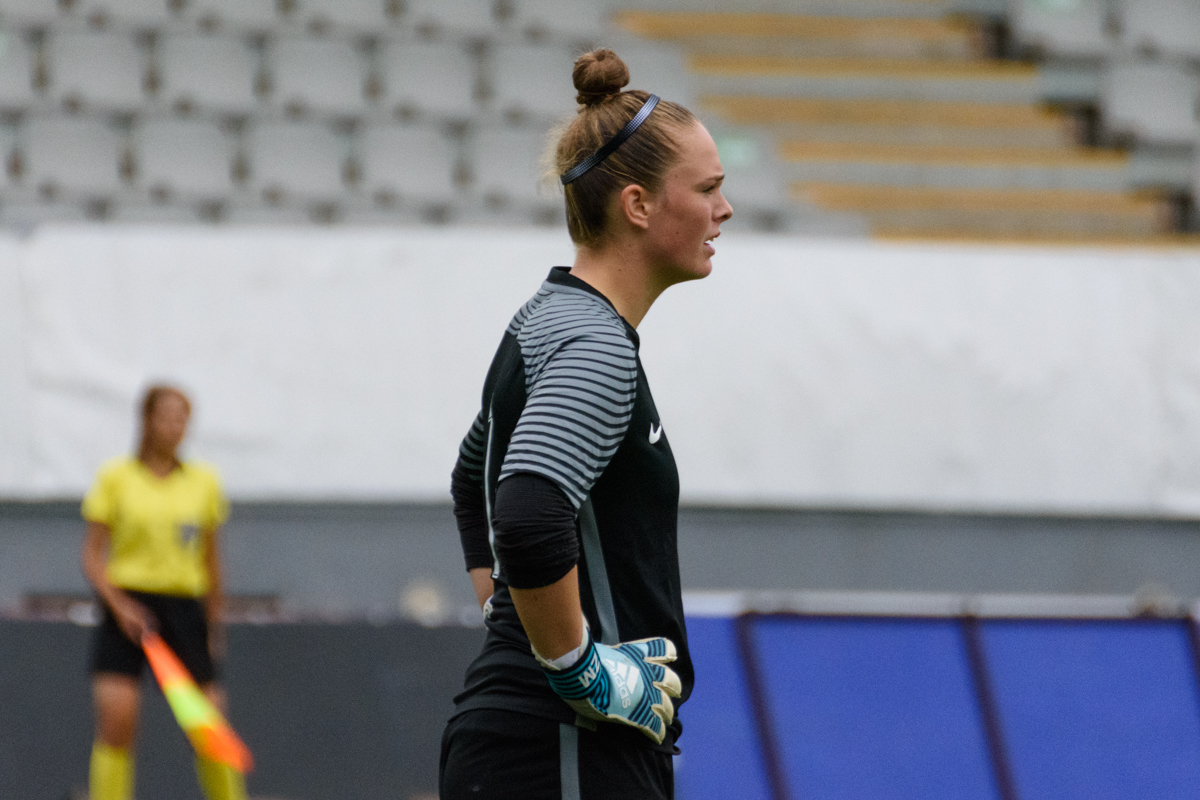
- Meršnik representing Slovenia in 2018

Personal information
- Date of birth: 7 June 2001 (age 25)
- Place of birth: Slovenia
- Position: Goalkeeper

Team information
- Current team: Al-Ittihad

Senior career*
Years	Team	Apps	(Gls)
2015–2019	Pomurje	30	(0)
2019–2022	Turbine Potsdam	15	(0)
2022–2024	Sporting de Huelva	35	(0)
2024–	Al-Ittihad	3	(0)

International career^{‡}
2017–	Slovenia	10	(0)
- * Club domestic league appearances and goals as of 18 September 2022 ‡ National team caps and goals as of 19:21, 30 August 2019 (UTC)

Zala Meršnik (born 7 June 2001) is a Slovenian professional footballer who plays as a goalkeeper for Al-Ittihad and the Slovenia women's national team.

== Career ==
Meršnik has been capped for the Slovenia national team, appearing for the team during the 2019 FIFA Women's World Cup qualifying cycle.
