= Rayanne Machado =

Brazilian footballer

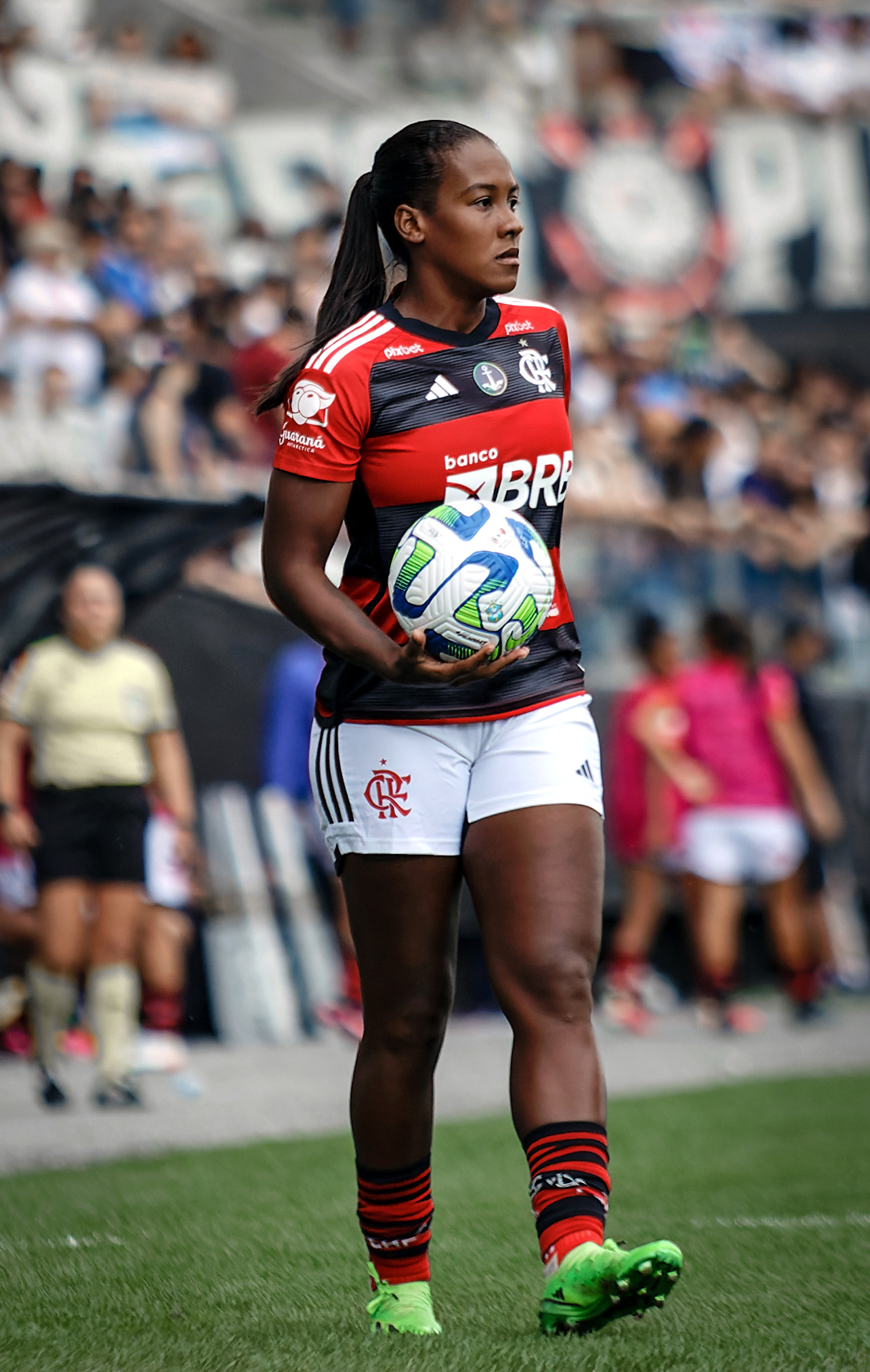
- Machado in 2023

Personal information
- Full name: Rayanne Cristine dos Santos Melo Machado
- Date of birth: 16 June 1994 (age 32)
- Place of birth: Rio de Janeiro, Brazil
- Position: Defender

Team information
- Current team: Al Qadsiah
- Number: 94

Senior career*
Years	Team	Apps	(Gls)
2013	Cesarense	2	(1)
2013	Foz Cataratas	1	(0)
2014	Vasco da Gama	4	(0)
2015	Kindermann	2	(0)
2016–2019	Flamengo	40	(0)
2019–2021	Braga	32	(1)
2021–2023	Flamengo	11	(0)
2023–	Al Qadsiah	4	(0)

International career^{‡}
2018–	Brazil	2	(0)
- * Club domestic league appearances and goals as of 29 May 2022 ‡ National team caps and goals as of 20:02, 20 July 2021 (UTC)

Rayanne Cristine dos Santos Melo Machado (born 16 June 1994) is a Brazilian footballer who plays as a defender for Saudi club Al Qadsiah and the Brazil national team.

== Club career ==
Machado played for several clubs in Brazil and Portugal including Flamengo and Braga. She joined Saudi club Al Qadsiah ahead of the 2023–24 season.

== International career ==
Machado made her debut for the Brazil national team on 29 July 2018 against Japan in the 2018 Tournament of Nations.
