= Al-Ahli Saudi FC (women) =

Women's association football club from Saudi Arabia

Al-Ahli Saudi Women
- Full name: Al-Ahli Saudi Women Football Club
- Nicknames: Al-Malaki (The Royal); Maeqil Al'Aswad (Lionesses Stronghold); Al-Raqi (The Classy)
- Short name: Al-Ahli Ladies
- Founded: 2019; 7 years ago as Miras Jeddah Club; October 6 2022; 3 years ago as Al–Ahli Saudi Women's Football Club
- Ground: King Abdullah Sports City
- Capacity: 62,346
- Owner(s): Public Investment Fund (75%); Al-Ahli Non-Profit Foundation (25%)
- Chairman: Khalid Al-Essa Al-Ghamdi
- Head coach: Manar Fraij
- League: Saudi Women's Premier League
- 2024–25: SWPL, 2nd of 8
Home colours	Away colours	Third colours

Al-Ahli Saudi Women Football Club (Arabic: النادي الأهلي السعودي لسيدات, romanized: an-nādī al-ʿahlī as-saʿūdī li-sāyīdāt), known simply as Al-Ahli Ladies, is a professional women's football club based in Jeddah, Saudi Arabia. It was established in 2022 as the women's section of the homonymous club, following an acquisition of the sporting license of Miras Women Football Club.

The team compete in the Saudi Women's Premier League, the top flight in Saudi national football, since its debut in the inaugural 2022–23.

== History ==
=== Formation (2022) ===
On October 6, 2022, it was announced by Saudi Arabian Football Federation that Al-Ahli officially completed its acquisition of Miras Jeddah Club, a club from the Women's Premier League 2022–2023 season. as They joined the list of professional sports clubs participating in the Women's Premier League alongside Al-Hilal, Al-Nassr, and Al-Ittihad.

=== Revamp: Key signings and season turnaround (2022–present) ===
Following the intention of Saudi Arabian Football Federation to promote and professionalize the women's football league. Al-Ahli announced the appointment of Jordanian coach Manar Fraij to manage the team, an ex-international player and former coach of the Jordanian women's youth national team. Al-Ahli later announced the signings of five international players from the North African region, namely Algerian Abla Bensenouci and Tunisian quartet Salima Jobrani, Sana Yaakoubi, Yasmine Jemai and Aya Jeddi.

after the conclusion of 2022 CAF Women's Champions League season, Al-Ahli went on to sign the top-scorer of the tournament ASFAR and Morocco women's national team forwards Ibtissam Jraïdi which was described as the major money deal and the largest in the continents (Africa and Asia) for a women's football player transfer. Jraïdi's signing played a pivotal role in the team's turnaround from a challenging first half of the season, where Al-Ahli secured only two wins out of seven matches. With Jraïdi on board, the team achieved three wins, one draw, and narrowly lost matches, ultimately securing a 6th position out of 8. Jraïdi also emerged as the runner-up in the top scorers' list.

As the 2023–24 season commenced, Al-Ahli gained confidence and set their sights on winning the league. Notable signings included Ghanaian striker Alice Kusi, Jordanian goalkeeper Rwand Kassab, and defender Ayah Al-Majali, aimed at fortifying the team.

Taking part in the debut edition of the 2023–24 SAFF Women's Cup, Al-Ahli displayed utter dominance. They began by overpowering Al Bayraq with a resounding 17–1 victory in the round of 16. Their journey continued with a thrilling 4–3 win over league title holder Al Nassr in the quarterfinals. In a nail-biting semi-final match against Al Qadsiah, Al-Ahli secured a narrow 3–2 win. Ultimately, in the historic final, Al-Ahli emerged victorious, clinching the inaugural cup after beating Al-Shabab 3–2 to be crowned the first-ever champions.

== Season by season ==
Season	League			SAFF Cup	Super Cup
Season	Tier	Division	Position	SAFF Cup	Super Cup
2022–23	1	Premier League	6th of 8	N/A	N/A
2023–24	1	Premier League	2nd of 8	Champions	N/A
2024–25	1	Premier League	2nd of 10	Champions	N/A
2025–26	1	Premier League	TBD of 8	TBD	Runners-up

== Players ==
=== Current squad ===
As of 15 September 2026

Note: Flags indicate national team as defined under FIFA eligibility rules; some limited exceptions apply. Players may hold more than one non-FIFA nationality.

No.	Pos.	Nation	Player
1	GK	ENG	Claudia Moan
23	GK	KSA	Dima Shaikh
34	GK	KSA	Ghaliah Emam
22	DF	KSA	Sawaher Asseri
10	FW	KSA	Moluk Al-Hawsawi
18	FW	CPV	Adriana Semedo
21	DF	KSA	Raghad Ghandourah
11	MF	KSA	Raghad Helmi
7	MF	KSA	Raneem Al-Sharif
4	DF	KSA	Rahaf Al-Barakati
96	MF	KSA	Manal Al-Saud
29	MF	COD	Éva Sumo

No.	Pos.	Nation	Player
20	FW	KSA	Nadiyah Al-Dhidan
5	MF	KSA	Jawaher Al-Thagafi
44	MF	KSA	Wejdan Al-Balkhi
24	DF	ERI	Bushra Kihil
3	DF	KSA	Ghada Malhan
8	MF	ARG	Linda Bravo (C)
17	DF	KSA	Al-Anoud Al-Owayid
14	MF	DOM	Lucía León
15	FW	NGA	Chinaza Uchendu
19	FW	KSA	Maha Al-Sharif
6	MF	KSA	Malikah Al-Duays
70	FW	KSA	Danah Fahad

== Staff and management ==
=== Technical staff ===
Position	Name
Head coach	(Iceland) Þorlákur Arnason
Fitness coach	(Portugal) Miguel Patrão

=== Board members ===
Office	Name
President	Khalid Al Ghamdi
Vice-president	Khalid Al Hendi
Chief Executive Officer	Ron Gourlay
Director of Other Sports	Khalid Al Shafei
Director of Legal Affairs	Mohammed bin Laden
Commercial Director	Abdulaziz Al Anqari
Investment Officer	Ayman Al Rashed
Board Member	Osama Shaker
Board Member	Muhannad Al Blahid

== Managerial history ==
Below is a list of Al-Ahli Women coaches from 2022 until the present day.

Name	Nationality	Years
Manar Fraij	Jordan	2022–current

== Honours ==
Saudi Women's Premier League:

- Runners-up (2): 2023–24, 2024–25

SAFF Women's Cup:

- Champions (2; record): 2023–24, 2024–25

Saudi Women's Super Cup:

- Runners-up (1): 2025
