= Al-Ula FC (women) =

Saudi women's association football club

Al-Ula
- Full name: Al-Ula Women's Football Club
- Nickname: Arabian Tigress
- Founded: 2022; 4 years ago
- Ground: Prince Mohammed bin Abdul Aziz Stadium; Medina
- Capacity: 24,000
- Owner: Royal Commission for Al-Ula
- Chairman: Amr Al-Madani
- Head coach: (Malta) Ray Farrugia
- League: Saudi Women's Premier League
- 2024–25: 5th
Home colours	Away colours

Al-Ula Women's Football Club (Arabic: فريق العلا للسيدات) is a Saudi professional women's football club based in Al-Ula, Medina Province. It plays in the Saudi Women's Premier League, the top tier women's football league in Saudi Arabia.

Al-Ula successfully secured promotion to the premier league in their inaugural season.

== History ==
Founded in 2023, Al-Ula's women's team began its journey in May, holding trials after appointing Jordanian coach Alaa Abu Qasheh to lead. Starting training sessions in mid-July, they aim to shape a team that meets high expectations for their debut in the Women's First Division League in November. Prior to launching their league campaign, the club secured the signatures of five foreign players, including two European internationals, Bosnian Selma Kapetanović and Croatian Fatjesa Gegollaj, marking the league's first-ever signings of active European internationals. The club made history by winning their inaugural match 14–0 against Ohd, a game that concluded before full time due to a shortage of players on the opposing team.

Following an impressive performance in the group stage, where they won seven matches and drew one, maintaining an unbeaten record, Al-Ula secured qualification for the final stages. Al-Ula outperformed Al-Bayraq with a 5–0 victory and drew 1–1 against Abha, securing their spot in the league's semi-finals. On March 10, 2024, Al-Ula secured promotion to the Saudi Women's Premier League by defeating Al-Amal 3–0 in the semi-final match.

Al-Ula emerged as champions of the First Division, clinching victory in the final by defeating Al-Taraji on penalties, thus becoming the second team ever to claim the title.

== Players ==
=== Current squad ===
As of 27 September 2024

Note: Flags indicate national team as defined under FIFA eligibility rules; some limited exceptions apply. Players may hold more than one non-FIFA nationality.

No.	Pos.	Nation	Player
1	GK	BRA	Aline
3	DF	BRA	Tuani Lemos
4	DF	KSA	Dana Filemban
5	DF	KSA	Dena Bakar
6	MF	KSA	Wojood Al-Harthi
7	MF	BIH	Selma Kapetanović
8	FW	BRA	Jaine Lemke
9	FW	KSA	Shaima Mahmoud
11	FW	KSA	Hebah Bukhari
12	FW	KSA	Ghaliah bin Laden
17	FW	KSA	Nawras Al-Khaldi

No.	Pos.	Nation	Player
15	MF	YEM	Hadeel Jehran
18	DF	KSA	Majd Al-Otaibi
19	MF	KSA	Mariam Al-Tamimi
20	MF	KSA	Nadiyah Al-Dhidan
22	DF	KSA	Lama Abdullah
25	GK	EGY	Tasnim Ahmed
26	MF	BIH	Melisa Hasanbegović
28	DF	KSA	Maya Al-Zahrani
30	DF	KSA	Asrar Al-Shaibani
91	DF	KSA	Raghad Helmi
—	GK	KSA	Hiba Asad

== Coaching and management staff ==
Position	Name
Head coach	(Malta) Ray Farrugia
Assistant coach	(Malta) Brian Bartolo
Assistant coach	(Netherlands) Wilco van Buuren
Assistant coach	(Saudi Arabia) Nada Abdullah
Goalkeeping coach	(Portugal) Miguel Ângelo Menezes
Fitness coach	(Spain) Bethany Testro
Video analyst	(Romania) Sergiu Bolboaca
Head of Physiotherapy Unit	(Spain) Rodrigo Martín Baeza
Physiotherapy Specialist	(Egypt) Marwa El Adrosy

Last updated: November 7, 2024
Source: Al-Ula

== Records and statistics ==
=== Competition record ===
Al-Ula's performance over their completed seasons:

Season	Div.	pos.	Pld	W	D	L	GF	GA	Season Top Scorer	Saudi Women's Cup pos.
2023–24	1. D	1st	12	9	3	0	73	3	(Bosnia and Herzegovina) Selma Kapetanović	N/A

== Honours ==
- Saudi Women's First Division League (tier 2):
  - Champions (1): 2023–24
