= Saudi Women's Premier League =

Top-tier women's football league in Saudi Arabia

Saudi Women's Premier League الدوري السعودي الممتاز للسيدات
- Organising body: Saudi Arabian Football Federation
- Founded: 15 September 2022; 4 years ago
- Country: Saudi Arabia
- Confederation: AFC
- Number of clubs: 8
- Level on pyramid: 1
- Relegation to: Saudi Women's First Division League
- Domestic cup(s): SAFF Super Cup; SAFF Women's Cup; SAFF Challenge Cup
- International cup(s): AFC Women's Champions League; WAFF Women's Clubs Championship
- Current champions: Al-Nassr (4th title) (2025-26)
- Most championships: Al-Nassr (4 titles)
- Top scorer: (Morocco) Ibtissam Jraïdi (74 Goals)
- Broadcaster(s): List of broadcasters
- Website: saff.com.sa
- Current: 2026–27 Saudi Women's Premier League

The Saudi Women's Premier League, officially the SAFF Women's Premier League, is the top-tier Saudi women's league in the Saudi football league system.

== History ==
Logo of the league until 2022

The first Saudi women's football clubs were King's United, based in Jeddah, and Eastern Flames, based in Dhahran. Both were established in 2006. Other teams were later formed in Riyadh and Dammam. In 2008, the first women's football tournament in Saudi Arabia was held, featuring seven teams.

In December 2019, the Jeddah Women's Football League took place—the first women's competition organized by the Saudi Arabian Football Federation. It was won by Jeddah Eagles.

In February 2020, Saudi Arabia announced the launch of a national football league for women, which officially began on 17 November 2020. The inaugural edition featured 24 teams divided into three regional zones: Jeddah, Riyadh, and Dammam. These zones formed the basis of the Women's Community Football League. The top four teams qualified for the WFL Champions Cup, which was won by Challenge Sports Club.

On 24 July 2023, the Saudi Women's Premier League made its first appearance in the FIFA Women's World Cup through the presence of Al-Ahli striker Ibtissam Jraïdi with the Morocco national team in the 2023 FIFA Women's World Cup in Australia and New Zealand. Then, on July 30, she became the first player from the Saudi Women's Premier League to score a goal in the World Cup, against South Korea.

In October 2023, the Saudi Women's Premier League partnered with DAZN, granting the platform global streaming rights for league matches. The agreement marked a significant milestone in the league's development and global exposure.

On 14 December 2023, FIFA President Gianni Infantino attended the match between Al-Ahli and Al-Ittihad at Prince Mohammed Abdullah Al-Faisal Stadium in Jeddah.

On 23 December 2023, The Best FIFA Women's Player for 2021 and 2022, Spain's Alexia Putellas, attended the match between Al-Ittihad and Al-Nassr at Al-Ittihad Club Stadium in Jeddah.

In March 2024, Hiba Al-Qwaidi became the Saudi Women’s Premier League’s first female referee, by officiating a match between Al-Qadsiah and Al-Riyadh.

In May 2024, Grass Valley announced a collaboration with the Saudi Pro League to distribute matches of the 2024–25 Saudi Women's Premier League through its digital platform.

On 31 May 2024, the Saudi Arabian Football Federation renewed its exclusive sponsorship agreement with the Saudi National Bank for an additional three years. The agreement covers sponsorship of both the Saudi Women's Premier League and the SAFF Women's Cup.

On 10 January 2025, Jorge Vilda, coach of the Spanish team that won the 2023 FIFA Women's World Cup, attended the match between Al-Ahli and Al-Amal at Prince Mohammed Abdullah Al-Faisal Stadium in Jeddah.

In September 2025, the All Women Sport Network (AWSN) announced a partnership with the Saudi Arabian Football Federation and SSC to broadcast the 2025–26 Saudi Women's Premier League matches globally. This agreement also included the launch of a 24-hour women's sports channel in Saudi Arabia, aiming to showcase professional women's sports at an international level.

On 3 November 2025, Moroccan Ghizlane Chebbak from Al-Hilal became the first player from the Saudi Women's Premier League to be included in the FIFPRO list for 2025.

Following the closure of SSC in October 2025, MBC Group signed an agreement with the Saudi Arabian Football Federation to broadcast the Saudi Women's Premier League matches across the Middle East and North Africa for the 2025–26 and 2026–27 seasons.

In August 2026, Al-Qadsiah signed Spaniard Esther Gonzalez, making her the first player to win the Women’s World Cup to play in the Saudi Women’s Premier League.

== Current teams ==
Locations of the 2025–26 Women's Premier League teams

The following ten teams are competing in the 2025–26 season.

| Team | Location | Ground | Capacity | 2024–25 Season |
|---|---|---|---|---|
| Al-Ahli | Jeddah | Prince Mohammed Abdullah Al-Faisal Stadium | 10,000 | 2nd |
| Al-Hilal | Riyadh | Inaya Medical Colleges Stadium | 2,000 | 6th |
| Al-Ittihad | Jeddah | Al-Ittihad Club Stadium | 15,000 | 7th |
| Al-Nassr | Riyadh | Prince Abdul Rahman Stadium | 10,000 | 1st |
| Al-Qadsiah | Khobar | Prince Saud bin Jalawi Sports City Stadium | 11,000 | 3rd |
| Al-Ula | Medina | Prince Mohammed Bin Abdulaziz Sports City Stadium | 24,000 | 5th |
| Eastern Flames | Dammam (Qatif) | Prince Saud bin Jalawi Sports City Stadium (Al-Safa Club Stadium) | 11,000; 3,500 | 8th |
| Neom | Tabuk | King Khalid Sport City Stadium | 12,000 | D1, 1st |

== Champions ==
=== By season ===
| Season | Winners | Runners-up | Third place | Ref | | | | |
|---|---|---|---|---|---|---|---|---|
| Season | Winners | Runners-up | Third place | Ref | 2022–23 | Al-Nassr | Al-Hilal | Al-Shabab |
| 2023–24 | Al-Nassr (2) | Al-Ahli | Al-Shabab | | | | | |
| 2024–25 | Al-Nassr (3) | Al-Ahli | Al-Qadsiah | | | | | |
| 2025–26 | Al-Nassr (4) | Al-Ahli | Al-Ittihad | | | | | |

== Records ==
=== All-time table ===
Key

Teams that have participated in every season since the league's inception.
Teams currently competing in the league as of the 2025–26 season.
Teams that participated in the past but are now defunct or have merged with other clubs.

| Rnk | Team | Part. | Pld | W | D | L | GF | GA | GD | Pts |
|---|---|---|---|---|---|---|---|---|---|---|
| 1 | Al-Nassr | 4 | 60 | 53 | 3 | 4 | 235 | 60 | +175 | 162 |
| 2 | Al-Ahli | 4 | 60 | 34 | 8 | 18 | 196 | 104 | +92 | 110 |
| 3 | Al-Hilal | 4 | 60 | 32 | 8 | 20 | 176 | 99 | +77 | 104 |
| 4 | Al-Ittihad | 4 | 60 | 27 | 11 | 22 | 145 | 90 | +55 | 92 |
| 5 | Al-Shabab | 3 | 46 | 25 | 8 | 13 | 132 | 66 | +66 | 83 |
| 6 | Al-Qadsiah | 3 | 46 | 23 | 12 | 11 | 128 | 54 | +74 | 81 |
| 7 | Al-Ula | 2 | 32 | 13 | 4 | 15 | 52 | 71 | −19 | 43 |
| 8 | Eastern Flames | 4 | 60 | 7 | 6 | 47 | 66 | 207 | −141 | 27 |
| 9 | Al-Yamamah | 1 | 14 | 6 | 3 | 5 | 40 | 15 | +25 | 21 |
| 10 | Al-Amal | 1 | 18 | 3 | 1 | 14 | 23 | 58 | −35 | 10 |
| 11 | NEOM | 1 | 14 | 1 | 3 | 10 | 9 | 35 | −26 | 6 |
| 12 | Al-Riyadh | 1 | 14 | 0 | 1 | 13 | 8 | 79 | −71 | 1 |
| 13 | Al-Taraji | 1 | 18 | 0 | 0 | 18 | 8 | 108 | −100 | 0 |
| 14 | Al-Bayraq | 1 | 14 | 0 | 0 | 14 | 1 | 173 | −172 | 0 |

=== Top scorers ===
Last Update Date — 24 April 2026
| Rank | Player | Goals |
|---|---|---|
| 1 | (Morocco) Ibtissam Jraïdi | 74 |
| 2 | (Iraq) Shokhan Salihi | 60 |
| 3 | (Tanzania) Clara Luvanga | 54 |
| 4 | (Democratic Republic of the Congo) Naomie Kabakaba | 44 |
| 5 | (Algeria) Lina Boussaha | 30 |
| 6 | (Cameroon) Ajara Nchout | 29 |
| 7 | (Venezuela) Oriana Altuve | 22 |
| 8 | (Brazil) Letícia Nunes | 22 |
| 9 | (Saudi Arabia) Al-Bandary Mobarak | 22 |
| 10 | (Brazil) Duda Francelino | 21 |

=== Seasonal statistics ===
Saudi Women's Premier League's general statistics
| Season | Total Matches | Win | Score draw | Goalless draw | Total goals | Goals ratio | 1st half Goals | 2nd half Goals | (yellow card) Yellow Cards | (red card) Red Cards |
|---|---|---|---|---|---|---|---|---|---|---|
| 2022–23 | 56 | 47 | 6 | 3 | 351 | 6.3 per match | 176 | 175 | 154 | 8 |
| 2023–24 | 56 | 46 | 6 | 4 | 224 | 4.0 per match | 104 | 119 | 159 | 5 |
| 2024–25 | 90 | 82 | 3 | 5 | 397 | 4.4 per match | 183 | 214 | 252 | 12 |
| 2025–26 | 56 | 49 | 6 | 1 | 247 | 4.4 per match | 120 | 127 | 156 | 7 |
| Total | 258 | 224 | 21 | 13 | 1219 | 4.7 per match | 583 | 635 | 721 | 32 |

=== Largest victories ===
As of 24 April 2026

Biggest wins in Saudi Women's Premier League history
| Season | Date | Match | Score |
|---|---|---|---|
| 2022–23 | 13/10/2022 | Al-Bayraq – Al-Nassr | 0–18 |
| 2022–23 | 12/11/2022 | Al-Bayraq – Al-Yamamah | 0–10 |
| 2022–23 | 19/11/2022 | Al-Bayraq – Al-Hilal | 0–18 |
| 2022–23 | 02/12/2022 | Eastern Flames – Al-Bayraq | 11–0 |
| 2022–23 | 06/12/2022 | Al-Ittihad – Al-Bayraq | 11–0 |
| 2022–23 | 17/12/2022 | Al-Nassr – Al-Bayraq | 11–0 |
| 2022–23 | 30/12/2022 | Al-Bayraq – Al-Ittihad | 0–14 |
| 2022–23 | 24/01/2023 | Al-Yamamah – Al-Bayraq | 13–0 |
| 2022–23 | 31/01/2023 | Al-Hilal – Al-Bayraq | 18–0 |
| 2022–23 | 11/02/2023 | Al-Shabab – Al-Bayraq | 19–0 |
| 2023–24 | 16/03/2024 | Al-Riyadh – Al-Ittihad | 2–13 |
| 2023–24 | 19/04/2024 | Al-Riyadh – Al-Shabab | 1–10 |
| 2024–25 | 27/12/2024 | Al-Taraji – Al-Nassr | 0–11 |

== Awards ==
At the end of each season, individual awards are presented to players in recognition of their performances.

| Season | Top Scorer | | Best Player | Best Goalkeeper | Best young player |
|---|---|---|---|---|---|
| 2022–23 | (Iraq) Shokhan Salihi (HIL) | 43 goals | (Saudi Arabia) Mubarkh Al-Saiari (NSR) | (Saudi Arabia) Laila Al-Qahtani (YAM) | Not awarded |
| 2023–24 | (Morocco) Ibtissam Jraïdi (AHL) | 17 goals | (Algeria) Lina Boussaha (NSR) | (United States) Lindsey Harris (QAD) | Not awarded |
| 2024–25 | (Morocco) Ibtissam Jraïdi (AHL) | 26 goals | (France) Léa Le Garrec (QAD) | (Slovenia) Zala Meršnik (ITI) | (Saudi Arabia) Sulaf Aseeri (QAD) |
| 2025–26 | (Tanzania) Clara Luvanga (NSR) | 24 goals | (France) Léa Le Garrec (QAD) | (Saudi Arabia) Mona Abdulrahman (NSR) | (Saudi Arabia) Lamar Balkhudher (ITI) |

== Former top league champions ==
Before the launch of the Saudi Women's Premier League, two leagues were established to test and set things up, laying the foundation for the top-tier competition. These leagues served as crucial stepping stones, refining the structure and ensuring the success of the premier league.

The list of champions and runners-up:

| Year | Champions | Runners-up | Ref |
Women's Community Football League
| 2020–21 | Challenge SC | Jeddah Eagles LFC | |
SAFF Women's National Football Championship
| 2021–22 | Al-Mamlaka FC | Challenge SC | |

== Sponsorship ==
| Sponsor(s) | Period | Ref |
|---|---|---|
| Lay's | 2023–present | |
| Saudi National Bank | 2024–present | |

== Broadcasters ==
| Region | Broadcaster | Period | Ref. |
|---|---|---|---|
| Saudi Arabia & Middle East and North Africa | SSC | 2023–2025 | |
| Saudi Arabia & Middle East and North Africa | MBC Action | 2025–present | |
| Saudi Arabia & Middle East and North Africa | MBC Shahid (streaming) | 2023–present | |
| Canada & North America | Grass Valley | 2024–present | |
| Europe & East Asia | DAZN | 2024–present | |
| Brazil | Canal GOAT | 2025–present | |

== See also ==
- Madaris League
- Saudi Women's Cup
- Saudi Women's Super Cup
- Women's association football
- Women's football in Saudi Arabia
- Saudi Women's First Division League
- Saudi Women's Premier Challenge Cup
- Saudi Girls' youth football competitions
- Saudi Women's Second Division League
