= Widely Distributed Records =

Record label

Widely Distributed Records was a Chicago, Illinois-based record label. It was founded in 1991 by Jack Frank, the sometime manager of the Chicago-based band Green, whose White Soul album and Bittersweet EP were released on the label that February 28.

== Artists ==
- Algebra Suicide
- Green
- Hip Deep Trilogy
- Joy Poppers
- The Lilacs
- Milk, Inc.

The label also released Rehearsal for Retirement, a compilation album featuring tracks by Hip Deep Trilogy, Fingerjays, Algebra Suicide, and the Lilacs, in November 1992.
