= Rief =

Rief is a surname. Notable people with the surname include:

- Josef Rief (born 1960), German politician
- Winfried Rief (born 1959), German psychologist

== See also ==
- Riem (name)
