= Rima (surname) =

Rima is a surname. Notable people with the surname include:

- Alex Rima (born 1929), Mauritian politician
- Marco Rima (born 1961), Swiss actor, comedian, cabaret artist, and producer
- Sharmin Sultana Rima, Bangladeshi Kabaddi player
- Tommaso Rima (1775–1843), Swiss-Italian physician and surgeon

== See also ==
- Rima (disambiguation)
- Rimas
