= R.E.M. (EP) =

REM

EP by Green
- Released: 1988
- Label: Pravda
- Producer: Iain Burgess, Jeff Lescher

REM is the 1988 EP released by the Chicago-based band Green. The EP was titled as such in response to R.E.M.'s release of the album Green. Both tracks were included on the European release of the band's Elaine MacKenzie album.

== Track listing ==
1. "My Tears Are Dry (Now)"
2. "Love on Thin Air"

== Personnel ==
- Rich Clifton - drums
- Ken Kurson - bass, keyboards
- Jeff Lescher - guitar
