= Reamer (disambiguation) =

A reamer is a type of cutting tool used in metalworking.

Reamer may also refer to:

- Reamer, West Virginia
- Citrus reamer, a utensil for extracting juice from citrus fruits

People with the surname Reamer:

- Cory Reamer (born 1987), American football linebacker
- George W. Reamer (1864–1938), American mining engineer and builder
- Robert Reamer (1873–1938), American architect

== See also ==
- Ream (disambiguation)
