= Rems =

Rems or REMS may refer to:

== People ==
- Ryan Rems, a Filipino comedian and television personality
- Rems Umeasiegbu, a Nigerian professor, scholar, novelist, poet and folklorist
- Tadej Rems, a Slovenian football player

== Science and technology ==
- Radiofrequency Echographic Multi Spectrometry
- Rapid eye movement sleep, a sleep phase
- Risk Evaluation and Mitigation Strategies, risk management plans to ensure safe use of dangerous pharmaceuticals
- Rover Environmental Monitoring Station, meteorological sensors on the Mars rover Curiosity

== Other ==
- Rams (card game), a card game also known as Rems
- Rems (river), a river in Germany
- Research, Evaluation, Measurement, and Statistics, a concentration in Educational Psychology at Texas Tech University
- No. 204 Reserve Equipment Maintenance Satellite at RCAF Station Assiniboia
- Romanian Electron Microscopy Society, a member society of the European Microscopy Society and consequently the International Federation of Societies for Microscopy.

== See also ==
- Rem (disambiguation)
- Knoellia remsis, a bacterium discovered in, and named after the Regenerative Enclosed Life Support Module Simulator (REMS)
