= List of Vampire Knight episodes =

The cover of the first DVD compilation released by Aniplex; the characters featured are Zero Kiryu (left), Yuki Kuran (center), and Kaname Kuran (right)

The episodes of the Vampire Knight anime adaptation is based on the manga series of the same name written by Matsuri Hino. They are directed by Kiyoko Sayama, and produced by Studio Deen and Nihon Ad Systems. The plot of the episodes follows Yuki Cross, a student at the Cross Academy, where she acts as a guardian of the "Day Class" along with vampire hunter Zero Kiryu from the secret vampires of the "Night Class" led by Kaname Kuran.

The first season premiered on TV Tokyo in Japan on April 7, 2008, and ran for thirteen episodes until the season's conclusion on June 30, 2008. The episodes were aired at later dates on TV Aichi, TV Hokkaido, TV Osaka, TV Setōchi, and TVQ Kyushu Broadcasting Co. The second season, named Vampire Knight Guilty, premiered on the same station on October 6, 2008, and ran until its conclusion on December 29, 2008. As of December 2008, five DVD compilations of the first season have been released by Aniplex and Sony Pictures between July 23, 2008, and November 26, 2008. The first DVD compilation for the second season was released by Aniplex on January 28, 2009, and the second compilation was released on February 25, 2009.

The series is licensed by Viz Media, who is streaming episodes of their Viz Anime website and broadcasting dubbed episodes on their online network, Neon Alley.

Four pieces of theme music are used for the episodes: two opening themes and two closing themes. The opening theme for the first season is "Futatsu no Kodō to Akai Tsumi" (ふたつの鼓動と赤い罪) by On/Off, and the closing theme is "Still Doll" by Kanon Wakeshima. The opening theme of the second season is "Rinne Rondo" (輪廻-ロンド-) by On/Off, and the ending theme is "Suna no Oshiro" (砂のお城) by Kanon Wakeshima. The original soundtrack for the series was released on June 25, 2008.

== Series overview ==
Season	Episodes	Originally released	
Season	Episodes	First released	Last released
1	13	April 7, 2008	June 30, 2008
2	13	October 6, 2008	December 29, 2008

== Episode list ==
=== Vampire Knight (2008) ===
No.	Title	Original release date
1	"Night of Vampires"; Transliteration: "Vanpaia no Naito" (Japanese: ヴァンパイアの夜)	April 7, 2008
Yuki Cross recalls her earliest childhood memories, in which she was attacked by a vampire as a little girl and saved by the Pureblood vampire Kaname Kuran. In the present, she is a teenager attending the high school campus of Cross Academy, a school founded by her adoptive father, Headmaster Kaien Cross, and she works as a "Guardian" with vampire hunter Zero Kiryu to protect the humans of the "Day Class" from the vampires of the "Night Class", an arrangement created by Kaien to foster better relations between vampires and humans. In evening, Yuki discovers a pair of male Night Class students, Hanabusa Aido and Akatsuki Kain, threatening to feed on two female Day Class students. Yuki attempts to stop them, only for Hanabusa to drink some of her blood from a wound she got from climbing down a tree. They retreat only after Zero arrives and threatens them with his anti-vampire gun, Bloody Rose. Kaname takes Hanabusa and Akatsuki to Kaien for punishment while the female students' memory is erased. Preparing for bed, Zero shows signs of vampirism by becoming enticed by the sight of Yuki's neck as she is drying her hair.
2	"Memories of Blood"; Transliteration: "Chi no Memorī" (Japanese: 血の記憶)	April 14, 2008
On St. Xocolatl Day, Yuki and Zero are forced to organize the exchanging of chocolates between the Day Class and Night Class members, a process made difficult since most of students of the Day Class are enamored with students of the Night Class. After the Night Class students receive all their presents, Zero gives Yuki's present to Kaname, who takes her present after discarding all the other gifts he received. Zero is constantly tempted by Yuki's scent and he has getaway from Yuki to avoid hurting her. In evening, Zero is attacked by several Night Class students, including Hanabusa and Akatsuki, and they retreat after realizing attacking Zero would incur Kaname's anger. Afterwards, Yuki finds Zero in Kaien's bathroom, giving him chocolate, she made herself. Zero sees Yuki's neck and his vampire impulses start, but he leaves before anything happens. After Zero leaves, Yuki notices he had a blood tablet with him, confusing her.
3	"The Fang of Repentance"; Transliteration: "Zange no Fangu" (Japanese: 懺悔の牙)	April 21, 2008
Kaien officially makes Yuki and Zero the members of the Disciplinary Committee. Yuki and Zero are assigned to inspect the dorms for any banned items. Later on, Yuki discovers Zero has blood tablets, normally taken by the Night Class students to quench their thirst for blood, forcing Zero flee to the nearby town. Following Zero, Yuki encounters a young boy who leads her deeper into the town. Revealing he is a vampire, the boy bites Yuki on the hand, and then she is attacked by another vampire. Both of the vampires are dispatched by Zero and Kaname, who reveals they are Level E vampires, degenerate vampires consumed by their thirst for blood. On patrol at night, Yuki comes across Zero, telling him about how much she feared the Level E vampires. Catching the scent of Yuki's blood, Zero is overcome by bloodlust and bites Yuki, drinking her blood. Yuki realizes Zero is a vampire.
4	"Trigger of Condemnation"; Transliteration: "Danzai no Torigā" (Japanese: 断罪の銃爪)	April 28, 2008
Arriving at the scene, Kaname approaches Zero, but Yuki collapses when she tries to calm him down, due to the lack of blood. Kaname tends to the bite marks Zero gave her, and Kaien later explains Zero's family was attacked by a Pureblood vampire named Shizuka Hio, who killed Zero's family and turned Zero into a vampire. Only Pureblood vampires have the cursed ability to turn humans into vampires, so Yuki is in no danger from Zero's bite. In the evening, she overhears a conversation between Kaname and Kaien discussing Zero's transfer to the Night Class. Yuki goes to the Night Class dorms, only to be briefly stopped by Hanabusa, in hopes to convince Kaname to stop the transfer. Kaname refuses, noting Zero will ultimately become a Level E vampire. Meanwhile, Zero ponders shooting himself with his anti-vampire gun, but is stopped by Yuki. He begs her to kill him, but she refuses. He later attempts to run away from the school, and Yuki stops him again.
5	"Moonlight Festivities"; Transliteration: "Gekka no Sabado" (Japanese: 月下の饗宴)	May 5, 2008
Kaien gives Yuki a protection bracelet which would stop Zero if he attempts to bite her again. However, Zero also gives her an anti-vampire gun to kill him with should he lose his humanity. A new ethics teacher, Toga Yagari, joins the school, and in his first class, Zero leaves. In the town, a Level E vampire attacks Yuki and Zero, and they are saved by Night Class students Takuma Ichijo and Senri Shiki, who explain they were hunting the Level E vampires as their duties as noble-class vampires. Takuma invites Yuki and Zero to his birthday party, in which Kaname explains to Yuki the continuing battle between vampires and vampire hunters. Zero leaves due to being uncomfortable by the presence of so many vampires and smelling Takuma's blood after his hand is sliced by a cake knife. Yuki follows Zero, seeing his body is rejecting the blood tablets, but he attempts to bite her. Unable to use the bracelet on Zero, Yuki pulls him into a pool and Zero manages to overcome his bloodlust. Yagari, revealing himself as being a vampire hunter, shoots Zero in the shoulder.
6	"Their Choices"; Transliteration: "Karera no Kuraimu" (Japanese: 彼等の選択)	May 12, 2008
Yagari explains he is Zero's teacher, and sacrificed one of his eyes to save Zero in the past. As Yagari prepares to kill Zero, Yuki shields him, which confuses Yagari, who believed Zero was a Level E vampire. Kaien arrives and convinces Yagari to leave. The following day, Zero is missing from class and Yagari tells Yuki he isolated Zero in Kaien's guest room. Yuki goes to Zero, and he describes a previous incident he had with a Level E vampire, before reluctantly accepting Yuki's offer to drink her blood. He warns her he may soon acquire a taste for her blood, but Yuki dismisses the warning. Later, Yuki meets Kaname, who realizes Zero drank Yuki's blood. Yagari arrives and asks Kaname why he has not killed Zero. Kaname replies he fears he would lose Yuki's affection if he did so. The next day, Zero and Yagari are absent from class, and Yuki finds Yagari pointing his gun at Zero again. As he pulls the trigger, Zero moves the gun away, finally deciding to live and fight against his vampiric urges once more. Before leaving, Yagari reveals this to be his motive all along and encourages Zero to struggle with all his life.
7	"The Scarlet Maze"; Transliteration: "Hiiro no Rabirinsu" (Japanese: 緋色の迷宮)	May 19, 2008
During his target practice, Zero learns he can sense Yuki's feelings for Kaname through her blood, only to make Yuki angry for knowing her feelings. In a flashback, Yuki recalls when Kaien adopted her and she was initially fearful of Kaname before becoming close to him. When Kaien brought Zero into the household, he explained to Yuki his entire family had been killed by a vampire. Zero was quite different from how he is now back then, being quiet and keeping to himself. Shortly afterwards, Kaien established the Cross Academy with the Day Class and Night Class, which infuriated Zero. After class one day, Yuki attempted to visit Kaname, and saw him drinking the blood of a female Night Class student named Ruka Souen, which causes a frightened Yuki to run away. In the present, Zero finds Yuki asleep and is tempted to drink her blood. Kaname catches up to Zero, explaining he has kept Zero alive all this time only for Yuki's sake.
8	"Gunshot of Sorrow"; Transliteration: "Nageki no Burasuto" (Japanese: 嘆きの銃声)	May 26, 2008
Kaname refuses to leave his room, a decision worries most of the Night Class students. Shortly afterwards, Takuma reveals his grandfather Asato Ichijo, a member of the Vampire Council, plans to visit the academy. Kaname leaves his room to greet Ichijo, who says he wants to drink Kaname's blood. Hanabusa and Ruka come between Ichijo and Kaname, explaining attempting to draw blood from a Pureblood vampire is taboo. Kaname hits Hanabusa for overstepping his authority, and later declines Ruka's offer to drink her blood. Later, Ichijo tells Takuma to continue to serve Kaname but keep watch on him. Yuki and Zero take Ichijo to Kaien. The next morning, Kaien assigns Zero to hunt down a Level E vampire. Yuki follows him and learns Senri and Rima Toya have been assigned by the Vampire Council to hunt the same vampire. After Zero ultimately kills the vampire, a girl who had been watching the incident through the eyes of a crow, announces to a man beside her she will be attending Cross Academy.
9	"Crimson Gaze"; Transliteration: "Kurenai no Aizu" (Japanese: 紅の視線)	June 2, 2008
Zero dreams about being cradled in Shizuka's arms. The Day Class students are excited over an upcoming ball, which they will attend with the Night Class students. Kaien asks Yuki to guide a transfer student to the Night Class named Maria Kurenai. When Maria attends class with the Night Class students, they are surprised by her boldness towards Kaname, and Hanabusa becomes suspicious of Maria because she is related to Shizuka. Maria encounters Yuki and Zero, who points his gun at her. After Yuki jumps in front of Maria, Zero allows Maria to leave. Hanabusa voices his concern to Akatsuki about Maria being related to Shizuka. The next day, Maria runs around the school during the day with Takuma giving chase. Yuki tries to help, but Zero stops her and tells her to stay away from Maria. Hanabusa later talks to Zero, who asks if Maria has any connection to Shizuka. Hanabusa reveals Maria is related to Shizuka, and Zero should know the answer better than anyone, as he has a blood bond with Shizuka. In the evening, Kaname lets Maria move into an old dorm which was used as the Moon Dormitory when it was first established. Once Maria moves into the dorm, she playfully pretends to bite her companion in her room.
10	"The Princess of Darkness"; Transliteration: "Yami no Porisonā" (Japanese: 闇の姫)	June 9, 2008
Zero remembers telling his twin brother Ichiru Kiryu to flee after Shizuka's attack. Maria tries to touch Yuki, but Zero pulls Yuki out of her reach. Zero begins to tutor Yuki in order to help her with her exams, and Zero tells Yuki is the only reason he is alive. Maria talks with Kaname, who knows who she really is. Later, Zero goes to the old dorm and Yuki secretly follows him. He attempts to kill Maria but is unable to pull the trigger because she is really his master, Shizuka in Maria's body. She attacks him, causing him to pass out from blood loss. Kaname erases Yuki's memory of the incident, and Maria has her companion take Zero away. The following day, Yagari is angry Kaien allowed Maria in the school. Kaien comments Kaname told him to admit Maria and the vampire world has its own way of dealing with these things. Kaname and Takuma visit Yuki to see if she remembers the events from the last night. Later, Maria unlocks Yuki's memory of Zero's fight and makes a deal with Yuki in order to save Zero from becoming a Level E vampire. Meanwhile, Zero recalls as a child he discreetly sensed Shizuka as a vampire during the day when Ichiru was unaware of this. When Shizuka suddenly appeared at night and attacked Zero's parents, Ichiru was standing next to Shizuka smiling. Zero awakens and greets Shizuka's companion, who he knows is Ichiru.
11	"The Consequence of Desire"; Transliteration: "Nozomi no Dīru" (Japanese: 望みの代償)	June 16, 2008
Ichiru reveals he felt inferior and worthless in comparison to Zero, and this led to him to become Shizuka's ally. Ichiru attacks Zero and their fight is stopped by Yagari, who is then attacked by Ichiru, but Ichiru falls to the ground sending his sword into the air. Yagari jumps in between Ichiro's sword as it comes down and his former pupil, resulting in Yagari being stabbed in the shoulder. Zero takes Yagari to Kaien, and Yagari tells Kaien Ichiru has returned. Yuki recalls Maria's deal to save Zero, the option are either to give Maria her blood or to bring her the dead body of Kaname. Yuki allows Zero to feed on her blood while mulling on Maria's deal. Kaname gives Yuki a ball gown, and they dance on the terrace during the ball. Yuki later accuses Kaname of treating her like a child, and Kaname claims he simply wishes to protect her. Yuki leaves to talk with Maria, and Zero searches for Yuki. Meanwhile, Hanabusa and Akatsuki find Shizuka's real body encased in ice underground, and Seiren, another Night Class student, tells them Kaname has ordered them to leave it alone.
12	"Vow of the Pureblood"; Transliteration: "Junketsu no Puraido" (Japanese: 純血の誓い)	June 23, 2008
Yuki tells Maria to drink her blood in exchange for saving Zero, but Yuki is caught off guard when Shizuka transfers her soul from Maria back to her original body. When Zero arrives to stop her, Shizuka uses her voice to compel Zero to restrain Yuki. He breaks the compulsion by shooting himself in the leg. Zero injures Shizuka, who leaves after Ichiru arrives. Ichiru begins to fight Zero, and Yuki stops their fight. Ichiru threatens to kill Yuki, and Zero points Bloody Rose at Ichiru's head in response. However, Ichiru reveals the gun cannot harm him, as Shizuka never changed him into a vampire. Meanwhile, Yagari continues to argue with Kaien, who claims he cannot interfere with vampire affairs under Kaname's jurisdiction. Shizuka goes to Kaname's old room, and he pierces her heart with his hand. After he drinks her blood, he vows to destroy their mutual enemy. Zero tells Ichiru the smell of blood is strong. Ichiru leaves and finds Shizuka barely alive.
13	"Crimson Chains"; Transliteration: "Shinku no Ringu" (Japanese: 深紅の鎖)	June 30, 2008
As Shizuka slowly dies at Ichiru's side, she recalls Ichiru visiting her body when she first took over Maria's body. Not wanting to turn him into a vampire, she tells him about her past engagement to a Pureblood vampire. She once turned a human into a vampire and became very attached to him. Ichiru drinks Shizuka's blood before she turns to dust. Zero rushes into the room, and Ichiru relates the hatred Zero feels for him before he leaves. Zero collapses shortly afterwards due to his thirst for blood and he is taken to a secluded underground area by Yagari. Akatsuki arrives with Yuki. They see Kaien standing in the room over the dust which was previously Shizuka's body. He tells them Zero was badly injured, and he was taken to the medical clinic at the Hunters Association. Later, Akatsuki tells Kaname he believes Zero had killed Shizuka. Kaname acts sympathetic about Shizuka's death. This bothers Hanabusa greatly because he knows Kaname killed Shizuka. Hanabusa later explains to Akatsuki the man Shizuka's fiancé was executed by Zero and Ichiru's parents because he was on the list of vampires to be executed by the Hunter's Association, yet he had not fallen to Level E status. Meanwhile, Yuki asks Kaien about Zero's condition, and he later confides in her the guilt about Zero's pain to Kaname. Afterwards, Kaname goes to Zero, who is on the verge to becoming Level E, and forces Zero to drink his blood to alleviate his madness, claiming keeping him alive is for Yuki's sake.

=== Vampire Knight Guilty (2008) ===
No.	Title	Original release date
1	"Burden of Sinners ~Guilty~"; Transliteration: "Shukumei no Giruti" (Japanese: 宿命の罪人達)	October 6, 2008
While separating the Day Class students from the Night Class students to allow them to go to class, Yuki Cross accidentally calls Zero Kiryu as Kaname Kuran, which later disappoints him, as he has just returned from recovery. In the evening, Maria Kurenai awakens and confuses Zero for Ichiru. She tells Zero that Shizuka Hio was seeking the Pureblood vampire who changed the execution list of the Hunter's Association, resulting in the death of her lover. Yuki is saved by Zero from a vampire sent by the Vampire Council in order to execute Zero for supposedly killing Shizuka. Other vampires circle them ready to attack, but the Night Class students appear. Kaname orders the vampires to leave, stating that he does not want Cross Academy to be spoiled by foolish acts of vengeance. The vampires leave, stating they will report to the Vampire Council that Kaname is protecting Zero. When Kaname insinuates Zero was the one who killed Shizuka, Yuki claims she will not speak to him until he admits Zero is innocent. Later, Zero dreams about Shizuka, and awakens calling Yuki's name. When Yuki comes to comfort Zero, he stops himself from nearly kissing her.
2	"The Eternal Promise ~Paradox~"; Transliteration: "Eien no Paradokkusu" (Japanese: 永遠の約束)	October 13, 2008
Yuki and her friend Sayori "Yori" Wakaba walk through the nearby town and encounter a lost boy. Though Yuki offers to take the boy back to his parents, he takes her to an abandoned building and kisses her in gratitude, which knocks Yuki unconscious. Yuki awakens to find Kaname watching her. Kaname tells Yuki not to leave the room, informing her that there's a party for vampires in the building and the boy she encountered is a vampire. Meanwhile, Zero has been assigned to oversee the party by the Hunter's Association. He encounters Ichiru, who became employed by the Vampire Council after Shizuka's death. The boy goes to Yuki's room to apologize, and Yuki follows him. She sees the party as Kaname enters, and many parents offers their daughters in marriage to Kaname. Yuki returns to her room and Kaname comes in. Kaname, deciding to punish her, asks if she wants to be a vampire and live forever with him. Although she agrees, Kaname pulls away from her neck, revealing his punishment to Yuki for leaving the room was taken a bit too far. Yuki then meets up with Headmaster Kaien Cross and Yori. When snow begins to fall, it reminded Yuki of the day she was saved by Kaname from a vampire when she was a child. Yuki and Zero return to guardian duty the next morning. As he passes by, Kaname tells Yuki he knows she meant what she had said the night before, but she should not take it to heart.
3	"The Azure Portrait"; Transliteration: "Ruridama no Mirāju" (Japanese: 瑠璃玉の肖像)	October 14, 2008
The students of Cross Academy go on break. Kaname, along with Rima Toya, Ruka Souen, Akatsuki Kain and Takuma Ichijo, go to visit the Aido Villa. However, Hanabusa Aido stays on campus and Senri Shiki goes to see his lonely mother back home. In the Moon Dormitory, Hanabusa recalls Kaname killing Shizuka and then acting sympathetic. Yuki watches as Kaname and the others leave. On her way to the Sun Dormitory, she has a flashback and becomes scared. She encounters Hanabusa going into the boys section of the Sun Dormitory. He claims to have run away from his dorm. Yuki and Zero take him to the Headmaster's private quarters. Zero cooks dinner for him to satisfy his big appetite. Yagari voices his concern about Zero meeting Ichiru at the party. After hearing this, Kaien becomes worried that the Vampire Council approached the Hunter's Association with a deal. Meanwhile at the Aido Villa, Akatsuki searches through records of parties hosted by the Aido family, at the request of Hanabusa, to check if there is anyone who could hold a grudge against the Kuran family. Senri returns home and greets his mother, who tells Senri he looks more like his father each day and he needs to visit his great uncle. Later, Hanabusa takes a bath and recalls meeting Kaname when he was younger, noting the change in his personality before and after Kaname's parents died by suicide. While cleaning up, Yuki breaks a plate and cuts herself, telling Zero to drink her blood, a scene witnessed by Hanabusa. He returns to the Moon Dormitory and enters Kaname's study room, where he realizes Kaname is planning something big. Yuki ponders if it would be a good idea for Kaname to turn her into a vampire, but Zero says he would never let her become one, even if it means becoming Kaname's enemy.
4	"Devil's Awakening"; Transliteration: "Akuma no Ribidō" (Japanese: 悪魔の胎動)	October 27, 2008
Senri goes to see his great uncle, who takes him to a man immersed in a tub of blood. This man, who is Senri's father, awakens and asks Senri to lend him his power. Seiren informs Kaname of this, prompting him to return to the academy. Meanwhile, Yuki struggles to remember her past and has a hallucination being in bath filled with blood. Zero suggests she look in the records of the Hunter's Association for clues about her past. The two, along with Kaien and Yagari, travel to the headquarters, where Yuki discovers Kaien was formerly a vampire hunter. Zero is confronted by the president of the Hunter's Association, who reveals Zero can only save himself from becoming a Level E vampire either by drinking a Pureblood vampire's blood or by reversing the "Cursed Twins". When Yuki finds the page of the book containing her past, it suddenly bursts into flames. In the evening when Yuki is alone in her room, she sees a hallucination of herself as a little girl appearing in her room. After Zero talks to Kaien about the Cursed Twins, he goes up to visit Yuki. Feeling upset about what happened, she cries in his arms all night. Also at night, Hanabusa confronts Kaname about his plans. Kaname reveals his parents were murdered. Takuma meets with his grandfather Asato Ichijo, who addresses Senri as his lord.
5	"The Subordinate's Trap"; Transliteration: "Jūzoku no Torappu" (Japanese: 従属の罠)	November 3, 2008
Yuki continues to hallucinate her surroundings drenched in blood, and she is determined to ask Kaname about her past. Zero allows his twin brother Ichiru Kiryu to join the Day Class, and Kaien hopes the brothers can repair their relationship. During her night patrol, Yuki hallucinates blood is on her hand and she inadvertently attacks Kaname, who then comforts her and telling her he loves her. Zero confronts Kaname about Yuki's memories. Kaname attacks Zero and admits hating him because he does not fear or respect like a Pureblood vampire as he should. After smelling Yuki on Zero, Kaname claws at Zero's chest, causing him to bleed. He forces Zero to drink his blood again to stop his transformation into Level E so Zero can continue to serve Yuki because he will not betray her. As Zero drinks Kaname's blood, he sees one of Kaname's memories. Zero encounters Hanabusa as he leaves the Moon Dormitory. Hanabusa lets him leave even though he knows Zero drank Kaname's blood. Yuki resolves to talk with Kaname, and Kaname is worried Yuki will hate him when she learns the truth about her memories. She claims she could never hate him. Kaname asks Yuki to become his lover to prove her devotion. She agrees, much to Zero's surprise.
6	"The Fake Lovers"; Transliteration: "Itsuwari no Ravāzu" (Japanese: 偽りの恋人)	November 10, 2008
Kaname orders some of the Night Class students to guard Yuki after she has agreed to become his lover. Yuki begins to have nightmares and continues to see images of blood on everything she sees and touches. When she collapses from these images, she is taken to the infirmary, where Ichiru attempts to give her a vial of blood, and he is stopped by Hanabusa, who takes the vial. Later, Hanabusa gives the vial to Kaname, who destroys it. Yuki meets with Kaname, but she cannot ask him any questions about her past due to the awkwardness of their meeting. Kaien invites Ichiru to dinner with Zero, but Yuki brings up she saw Ichiru in the infirmary and thought he was Zero. Zero's furious response to this causes Ichiru to leave. He tells Kaien it is too late to choose a different path. Later, Ichiru tells Zero not to fall in love with Yuki. Senri and Takuma return to the Moon Dormitory, and Rima realizes someone is possessing Senri after seeing one of his eyes is colored red.
7	"The Kiss of Thorns"; Transliteration: "Ibara no Kisu" (Japanese: 茨の口づけ)	November 17, 2008
Senri approaches Kaname, who knows Senri is possessed by his uncle Rido Kuran. Kaname attacks Senri, but Takuma stops him, claiming he will not allow Kaname to harm Senri. Kaname interprets Takuma's actions as he is siding with the Vampire Council. The other vampires notice Senri with Ichiru. Senri tells Ichiru to do the job well and he will make his wish come true. Meanwhile, Takuma stands in his room looking at a concrete casket. During class, Yuki has visions of a woman covered in blood and of a boy, who looks and sounds like Kaname. When Senri goes to see Ruka Souen in her room in an attempt to seduce her, Akatsuki intervenes while Takuma asks Senri to return to his room. Takuma asks Akatsuki and Ruka not to tell Kaname about this. Yuki begs Kaname to answer questions about her past but she collapses in his arms after hallucinating again. Kaname takes Yuki to Kaien, who reveals it is time for Yuki to be awakened. Meanwhile, Ichiru goes up to the concrete casket in Takuma's room and stomps on it, yelling for Yuki to awaken and give her blood to the monster in the casket. Yuki wakes up in her bed and hallucinates the room is covered in blood. When Zero comes into the room, Yuki involuntarily attempts to strangle him. After Zero offers no resistance, he tells her she needs Kaname more than she needs him. Kaname arrives and takes Yuki onto the roof of the building. He bites her, then he drinks his own blood, and transfers his blood to Yuki by kissing her. Zero arrives, misunderstanding Kaname has turned Yuki into a vampire. However, Yuki reveals Kaname is her older brother before fainting into Kaname's arms. Kaname then reveals he is not her real older brother, though he wishes he were.
8	"Spiraling Recollections"; Transliteration: "Tsuioku no Supairaru" (Japanese: 追憶の螺旋)	November 24, 2008
Kaname tells Zero Yuki is a Pureblood daughter of the Kuran family, and asks him what he will do because he hunts vampires. Kaname leaves with Yuki to Kaien's private quarters. Yuki starts to recall her father Haruka Kuran died fighting Rido and her mother Juri Kuran sacrificed herself to seal Yuki's memories and vampire powers transforming her into a human. Kaname meets with Akatsuki and Hanabusa, and reveals Yuki is both his sister and his fiancée. Upon awakening, Yuki drinks Kaname's blood and sees the scene tormented Zero after he drank Kaname's blood. She is saddened her parents sacrificed themselves to save her and begins to cry. Yuki realizes her parents were siblings, and Kaname reveals they are engaged, though this fact appears to disgust Yuki. Kaname orders the Night Class students to keep the Day Class students in the Sun Dormitory. Meanwhile, Rima battles Senri and is seriously injured. However, she pleads to Senri to regain control of his body, and this disallows Rido from moving it. Yuki decides to talk to Zero, and goes to the Sun Dormitory, despite Akatsuki and Hanabusa's pleas. When Yuki arrives at the door to Zero's room, she senses Zero has pointed Bloody Rose at her.
9	"Revival of the Mad Emperor"; Transliteration: "Fukkatsu no Enperā" (Japanese: 復活の狂王)	December 1, 2008
Zero claims only sense an arrogant Pureblood vampire on the other side of the door. Yuki falsely responds her human self was eaten by her vampire side, but her heart has remained unchanged. As Yuki leaves the Sun Dormitory, Hanabusa brings her shoes. He notices her tears, which it is unheard of to him for seeing Pureblood vampires cry, but she views only being allowed to cry in her own heart would be a punishment. Meanwhile, Kaname goes to where Rido's original body is kept, and asks Ichiru to open his casket. It really is a surprise for him to see Ichiru, as twins in vampire hunter families attempt to consume one another when they are in the womb. Kaname takes Ichiru's sword and stabs his hand to give Rido the necessary blood to revive. As Kaname leaves, he reveals he is the original member of the Kuran family, thus not related to Yuki, as her older brother. Rido summoned him from his slumber, rendering Kaname unable to kill Rido. As Kaien meets with Toga Yagari, Zero arrives and asks Yagari to kill him, but Yagari refuses and leaves Zero in a prison cell, as Zero reminisces about what Yuki said to him.
10	"Prelude to the Battle"; Transliteration: "Tatakai no Pureryūdo" (Japanese: 戦いの序曲)	December 8, 2008
Yuki sees the sun for the first time as a vampire and returns to her room with Hanabusa. Meanwhile, the Day Class students are gathered for evacuation, but many of them are separately attacked by Rido's vampire servants, who are soon destroyed by the Night Class students. When Yori is attacked, Yuki and Hanabusa arrive and defend her. Yuki's anti-vampire staff Artemis rejects her, but Hanabusa manages to kill the vampires. Even after learning Yuki is a vampire, Yori still accepts Yuki as her best friend. Yagari confronts the vampire hunters sent to take Zero and demands the president of the Hunter's Association to come himself. Hanabusa has Yuki rest in the room where Shizuka had stayed, in which she dreams of Shizuka expressing her love for Ichiru. After being awakened by Kaname, Yuki asks him to stay and defend her friends, but he refuses and asks her to stay in the room. After Kaname leaves, Yuki convinces Hanabusa to allow her to leave and takes the anti-vampire gun Zero had given her. As Zero sits in silence in the prison cell, Kaname arrives, claiming Zero is the "knight" he has prepared for the past four years to kill Rido. He reveals Zero has been strengthened by drinking the blood of the three Pureblood vampires and is the stronger twin child of a vampire hunter. When Kaname tells Zero to kill Rido, Kaname reveals Rido will hunt Yuki until he devours her and claims Zero will never betray Yuki.
11	"Two Souls"; Transliteration: "Futari no Raibuzu" (Japanese: 二人の命)	December 15, 2008
Senri, now recovered, visits Rima in her room to thank her for calling out for him to regain control of his body. Kaien is confronted by the president of the Hunter's Association, who demands Kaien surrender Zero to him. Kaien refuses and fights the president, forcing him to retreat. For their safety, all the Day Class students are held in the auditorium, and Yori continues to worry about Yuki. Ichiru arrives in the prison cell and shoots Zero with the Bloody Rose. Zero recalls the close relationship he had with Ichiru when they were children and remembers Shizuka killing his parents. Before asking Zero to consume him, Ichiru reveals he was injured while attempting to kill Rido for Shizuka's sake because Rido was the one who put Shizuka's lover on the vampire execution list. Pretending to die from his wound, Ichiru succeeds in making Zero consume his blood, so Zero can complete his vampire hunter powers to control his thirst for blood. Zero leaves the bell Ichiru kept as a memento of Shizuka in his brother's hand before leaving the prison cell.
12	"World's End"; Transliteration: "Sekai no Piriodo" (Japanese: 世界の果て)	December 22, 2008
Surrounded by his remaining servants, Rido drinks their blood and waits for Yuki to come to him. While the Night Class students still battle Rido's servants, Yagari fights the Level E vampires sent by the Hunter's Association. The president of the Hunter's Association goes to Ichijo and asks for his blood to maintain his beauty as his face begins to crack and disintegrate. Ichijo kills him instead by breaking his neck, disgusted by his behaviour. Kaname goes to the meeting place of the Vampire Council and kills all of them except Ichijo, who manages to escape. As he leaves the building, Ichijo is confronted by Takuma, who uses his own anti-vampire sword to fight him and indicates he intends for both of them to die fighting each other as atonement for betraying his best friend. Kaien arrives to fight the vampires sent by the Hunter's Association, while Yuki and several Night Class students leave to fight Rido. When they attempt to fight Rido, he instantly paralyzes all of the Night Class members and attempts to drink Yuki's blood. Despite Artemis rejecting her, Yuki's determination to protect all of the students allows her to wield it, transforming into a scythe to reflect her vampiric nature. This amazes the Night Class students as a Pureblood should not be able to wield an anti-vampire weapon. Zero arrives and prepares to kill Rido, but he cannot control his new powers. Begging Yuki to slash him, Zero regains control after being injured by Artemis, then transforms Bloody Rose into a more powerful weapon.
13	"Vampire's Knight"; Transliteration: "Vanpaia no Naito" (Japanese: ヴァンパイアの騎士)	December 29, 2008
Using his new powers, Zero injures Rido with Bloody Rose, and Rido flees to the surrounding forest to drink the blood of his remaining servants to recover. Kaname fights Rido, but Zero then kills Rido with Bloody Rose. Zero turns the Bloody Rose towards Kaname, but he does not kill him when he senses Yuki nearby. Kaname tells Yuki it will soon be time to leave. Meanwhile, the Night Class students recalls before Kaname left to destroy the Vampire Council, he tells them he has no further use of them. Despite this, they still vow to follow Kaname. As Zero says farewell to Yuki, he dares her to drink his blood to prove she is a vampire. When doing so, she remembers when Zero told her he could tell she loved Kaname by her blood, learning Zero had fallen in love with her. However, Zero, stating his role as a vampire hunter, says he will ultimately kill Yuki, who will be looking forward to their next encounter someday, despite this cruel promise. Kaname questions Yuki if she truly wants to leave, even though Rido's threat has been eliminated. Yuki reminds Kaname he is among the people she wants to protect. After Yuki says goodbye to Kaien, she and Kaname leave the academy, along with Akatsuki, Seiren, Hanabusa and Ruka. Senri and Rima find Takuma's blade in the rubble of the Vampire Council's estate with no sign of him, but they believe he is still alive and go searching for him, hoping for a reward for returning his blade. Kaien, after vowing to himself never to use his blade again, announces to the Day Class students in the auditorium the danger has passed. Yagari ends up getting stuck with repairing the entrance gate Kaien damaged during the battle, surprisingly getting help from the other vampire hunters. As Yuki remembers the promise Zero gave her, she says to herself she will be waiting for day to come.

== DVD releases ==
The Region 2 DVD compilations of the Vampire Knight episodes are released in Japan by Aniplex and Sony Pictures. As of November 2008, five DVD compilations have been released, containing the entire first season. The first DVD compilation for the second season was released on January 28, 2009, and the last was released on May 27, 2009.

Season 1 – Vampire Knight
Volume	Date	Discs	Episodes
Volume 1	July 23, 2008	1	1–2
Volume 2	August 27, 2008	1	3–5
Volume 3	September 24, 2008	1	6–8
Volume 4	October 22, 2008	1	9–11
Volume 5	November 26, 2008	1	12–13

Season 2 – Vampire Knight Guilty
Volume	Date	Discs	Episodes
Volume 1	January 28, 2009	1	1–2
Volume 2	February 25, 2009	1	3–5
Volume 3	March 25, 2009	1	6–8
Volume 4	April 22, 2009	1	9–11
Volume 5	May 27, 2009	1	12–13
