= Reem =

Reem or REEM may refer to:

== People ==
- Reem (given name) means a baby deer or gazelle in Arabic
- Reem (singer), Danish singer

== Places ==
- Al Reem Island, island 600 meters off the coast of Abu Dhabi island

== Other ==
- Arabian sand gazelle, also known as the reem
- Reem International Circuit, venue of Motorsports in Riyadh Saudi Arabia
- Re'em, a Jewish mythological creature
- REEM, humanoid robot built by PAL Robotics
- "Reem", a 2011 single by Joey Essex

== See also ==
- Ream (disambiguation)
- Reim (disambiguation)
- Rem (disambiguation)
- Rheem (disambiguation)
- Riem (name), a list of people with the given name or surname
