= Rima (disambiguation) =

Rima, also known as "Rima the Jungle Girl", was an Edwardian-novel heroine.

Rima may refer to:

== Geography ==
- Rima, Morocco, a town and rural commune
- Rima, Qatana, Syria, a village
- Rima, Yabrud, Syria, a village
- Rima, Tibet, a town
- Rima River, a river in Nigeria
- Rima or Rimava, a river in Slovakia

== People ==
- Rima (given name)
- Rima (surname)

== Other uses ==
- Rima Mashiro, a fictional character from the manga series Shugo Chara!
- Rima Touya, a character from the Vampire Knight anime and manga series
- The singular form of Rímur, Icelandic epic poems written in certain specific meters
- Review of Indonesian and Malaysian Affairs an Australia-based academic journal
- Reversible inhibitor of monoamine oxidase A, a class of drug
- Rwanda International Movie Award, an annual film award
- Abbreviation of régiment d'infanterie de marine, see Troupes de marine
- Rille, also known as rima

== See also ==
- Reema, an Indian feminine given name
- Rima San Giuseppe, a town in northwestern Italy
- Rima Rima, a mountain in the Andes of Peru
