= Rapid eye movement =

Rapid eye movement may refer to:

- Rapid eye movement sleep or REM sleep
- Saccade, a fast movement of an eye
- Rapid Eye Movement (album), an album by Riverside
- Rapid Eye Movement, a progressive rock British band formed in 1980 by Dave Stewart, Pip Pyle, Rick Biddulph and Jakko Jakszyk
- R.E.M., an American rock band

== See also ==
- REM (disambiguation)
