= Ream =

Ream may refer to:

- Paper ream, a unit of quantity for paper
- Ream (surname)
- Reamer, tool used to widen a hole
- Ream, West Virginia
- Ream, the name of Rama in the Khmer version of the Ramayana, the Reamker
- Ream National Park, a national park in Cambodia
- Ream Naval Base, Sihanoukville, Cambodia

== See also ==
- Reem (disambiguation)
- Reamer (disambiguation)
