= Rem =

Rem or REM may refer to:

== Arts and media ==
=== Fictional characters ===
- Rem, an android in Logan's Run
- Rem, in Dream Hunter Rem
- Rem Saverem, in Trigun
- Rem, in Bobobo-bo Bo-bobo
- Rem (Death Note), a Shinigami in Death Note
- Rem Kaginuki, a devil in Dance with Devils
- Rem (Re:Zero), a character in the light novel/anime series Re:Zero − Starting Life in Another World
- Rem Galleu, in How Not to Summon a Demon Lord
- Rem, a hero in Deadlock (video game)

=== Music ===
- R.E.M., an American rock band
- R.E.M. (EP), by the band Green
- "R.E.M." (song), by Ariana Grande

== Organizations ==
- La République En Marche!, a French centrist political party
- Reichserziehungsministerium, in Nazi Germany, unofficially known as the Reich Education Ministry
- Reiss Engelhorn Museum, Germany
- Resource Extraction Monitoring, a UK-based non-profit organisation
- Rosicrucian Egyptian Museum, California, US
- REM Island, an offshore platform and home of the pirate stations Radio and TV Noordzee

== People ==
- Jakob Rem (1546–1618), Austrian Jesuit
- Lars Rem (born 1966), Norwegian politician
- Rem Koolhaas (born 1944), Dutch architect
- Rem Murray (born 1972), Canadian ice hockey left winger
- Rem Vyakhirev (1934–2013), Russian businessman
- Priscilla Hamby (born 1982), illustrator and comic book artist (pen name "Rem")

== Science and technology ==
- Rapid eye movement sleep, a phase of sleep
- Roentgen equivalent man (rem), a unit of radiation dose equivalent
- REM (BASIC), an inline comment (REMark) in BASIC and some other computer languages
- Rare-earth metal
- Reflection electron microscope
- Reticular erythematous mucinosis, a skin disease
- Root em, a font-size measurement used with Cascading Style Sheets
- Real ear measurement, measurement of sound pressure level in a patient's ear canal developed when a hearing aid is worn
- Random effects model, a statistical model
- rem(), CSS function

== Other uses ==
- Rém, a village in Hungary
- Réseau express métropolitain, a light metro system in Greater Montreal, Canada
- Rem (mythology), an Egyptian fish god

== See also ==
- In rem jurisdiction, a legal term
- REM World, a fantasy/science fiction novel by Rodman Philbrick
- Reem (disambiguation)
- Rems (disambiguation)
