= Reem (given name) =

Reem (Arabic: ريم) is a feminine personal given name in Arabic meaning gazelle, which symbolizes purity and tenderness. It has been widely used in Arab poetry and literature as a symbol of a beautiful woman.

== People ==
=== Reem ===
- Reem Abdalazem (born 1992), Egyptian swimmer
- Reem Abdullah (born 1987), Saudi Arabian actress
- Reem Alsalem (born 1976), Jordanian international lawyer
- Reem Acra, fashion designer born in Beirut, Lebanon
- Reem Alabali-Radovan (born 1990), German-Iraqi politician
- Reem Bassiouney (born 1973), Egyptian writer
- Reem Al Hashimi (born 1978), Emirati Minister of State and managing director of the Dubai World Expo 2020 Bid Committee
- Reem Al Numery (born 1996), Yemeni children's rights activist
- Reem Abu Hassan, Minister of Social Development, Jordan
- Reem Kassis (born 1987), Palestinian-born American writer and cookbook author
- Reem Maged (born 1974), Egyptian journalist
- Reem Al Marzouqi (born 1990), Emirati engineer
- Reem Obeid (born 1996), Lebanese footballer
- Reem Shaikh (born 2002), Indian actress
- Reem bint Mohammed Al Saud, Saudi Arabian photographer, political journalist, and gallery owner

=== Rym ===
- Princess Rym al-Ali (born 1969), Algerian wife of Prince Ali bin Al Hussein of Jordan

== See also ==
- Reem (disambiguation)
- Reema
- Rima (disambiguation)
