= Reim =

Reim is a surname which may refer to:

- Martin Reim (born 1971), Estonian football manager and former player
- Matthias Reim (born 1957), German singer

== See also ==
- Re'im, a kibbutz in Israel
- Edith Raim (1965–2025), German historian
- Reem (disambiguation)
- Riem (name), a list of people with the surname or given name
