= White Soul =

Studio album by Green
- Released: 1989
- Genre: Jangle pop
- Length: 40:59
- Label: Megadisc, Widely Distributed
- Producer: Iain Burgess, Green

Green chronology
Elaine MacKenzie (1987)	White Soul (1989)	The Pop Tarts (1992)

Professional ratings
Review scores
Source	Rating
Robert Christgau (along with the Bittersweet EP)	(neither)

White Soul is the third album by Chicago pop band Green, released in 1989 on Megadisc Records in the Netherlands. It was then re-released in the United States in 1991 on Widely Distributed Records, along with a new EP, Bittersweet.

== Track listing ==
All tracks are written by Jeff Lescher, except "My Sister Jane" and "I Beg, You Cry" by Ken Kurson.

Side one
No.	Title	Length
1.	"She's Heaven"	4:45
2.	"Night After Night"	3:16
3.	"Monique, Monique"	3:34
4.	"Hear Me"	3:10
5.	"My Sister Jane"	3:14
6.	"I'm in Love with You"	4:38

Side two
No.	Title	Length
1.	"I Don't Even Need Her (Now)"	4:21
2.	"I'm Not Giving Up"	3:19
3.	"I Beg, You Cry"	1:33
4.	"I Love Her"	2:20
5.	"Give Me Your Hands"	3:29
6.	"I Know"	3:20

== Personnel ==
Green

- Mark Mosher – drums
- Ken Kurson – bass guitar, vocals
- Jeff Lescher – guitar, vocals

Additional musicians and production

- Iain Burgess – production
- Green – production
