= The Pop Tarts =

Studio album by Green
- Released: 1992
- Genre: Jangle pop, alternative rock
- Length: 41:00
- Label: Megadisc
- Producer: Green

Green chronology
White Soul (1989)	The Pop Tarts (1992)	Green 5 (1998)

Professional ratings
Review scores
Source	Rating
Allmusic	4.5/5 stars

The Pop Tarts is the fourth album by Chicago pop band Green, released in 1992 on Megadisc Records.

== Track listing ==
All tracks are written by Jeff Lescher, except "Nature Boy", "Ready" and "Make Believe" by Clay Tomasek.

No.	Title	Length
1.	"Long Distance Telephone"	3:23
2.	"Broken Promises"	3:22
3.	"Find Your Way Around"	4:06
4.	"Nature Boy"	4:31
5.	"Skirt Chaser"	2:42
6.	"Hot Lava Love"	3:42
7.	"Ready"	1:54
8.	"Marga–Marguerite"	4:24
9.	"Hear What You Want To Hear"	3:10
10.	"Make Believe"	2:52
11.	"B.I.T.C.H."	4:43
12.	"Tough Cram Judy"	3:15

== Personnel ==
Green

- Joe Tech Huppert – piano, organ
- Jeff Lescher – guitar, vocals
- Mark Mosher – drums, vocals
- Clay Tomasek – bass guitar, vocals

Additional musicians and production

- Iain Burgess – engineering
- Green – production
- Jon McGahan – horns
- John Mierl – horns
