= Leadership (book) =

2002 book by Rudy Giuliani

- Authors: Rudolph W. Giuliani; Ken Kurson
- Publisher: Talk Miramax Books
- Publication date: October 1, 2002
- Media type: Print (Hardcover)
- Pages: 407
- ISBN: 0-7868-6841-4
- OCLC: 50696922
- Dewey Decimal: 303.3/4 21
- LC Class: HM1261 G58 2002

Leadership (published October 1, 2002) is a book written by Rudolph W. Giuliani with Ken Kurson about Giuliani's time as Mayor of New York City and how he reduced crime, and revitalized the economy of the city. Most of the book was written before the September 11, 2001 attacks, though Giuliani did include a section about his experiences that day and how he dealt with the emergency and the cleanup afterwards.

In 2007, this book was re-issued during Giuliani's presidential campaign, with a new introduction including Giuliani's perspective on various problems facing the United States.
