= Green (Green album) =

Studio album by Green
- Released: 1986
- Genre: Jangle pop
- Length: 40:25
- Label: Gang Green Records
- Producer: Green; Iain Burgess

Green chronology
The Name of This Group Is Green (1984)	Green (1986)	Elaine MacKenzie (1988)

Professional ratings
Review scores
Source	Rating
AllMusic	3.5/5 stars

Green is the debut album of Chicago pop band Green. It was released on Gang Green Records in 1986.

== Critical reception ==
The Chicago Reader wrote that the album "refracts hooky midwestern power pop from the late 70s and early 80s—Cheap Trick, the Shoes—through the prisms of British-invasion rock and brash punk ... insanely catchy." Trouser Press called it "an inadequately produced but brilliant collection of weirdly derivative originals played with spirit and power." Perfect Sound Forever wrote: "Hearing Green was like hearing The Beatles' Second Album for the first time; an overwhelming freshness coupled with eerie familiarity... like experiencing music for the first time for the second time ... It's one of the most startling debuts ever recorded."

== Track listing ==
All songs written by Jeff Lescher.

No.	Title	Length
1.	"Gotta Getta Record Out"	2:22
2.	"She's Not a Little Girl Anymore"	3:29
3.	"Technology"	2:19
4.	"Curry Your Favor"	2:58
5.	"Baby Why?"	1:41
6.	"I Play the Records"	3:15
7.	"Better Way"	3:45
8.	"If You Love Me"	2:43
9.	"I Don't Wanna Say No"	3:20
10.	"For You"	3:03
11.	"Hurt You"	3:29
12.	"She, Probably"	2:27
13.	"I'm Not Going Down (Anymore)"	2:17
14.	"Big in Japan"	3:18

1989 CD Re-issue Bonus Tracks
No.	Title	Length
15.	"Something About You"	2:59
16.	"Autograph"	3:40
17.	"Away From the Pulsebeat"	4:41

2009 Remaster Bonus Tracks
No.	Title	Length
15.	"Gotta Getta Record Out"	2:21
16.	"I Don't Wanna Say No"	3:07
17.	"Better Way"	3:33
18.	"I'm Not Going Down (Anymore)"	2:11
19.	"Something About You"	3:01
20.	"Autograph"	3:41
21.	"Away From the Pulsebeat"	4:41

== Personnel ==
Green

- John Diamond – bass guitar, vocals
- Jeff Lescher – guitar, vocals
- John Valley – drums

Additional musicians and production

- Green – production
