= Green (band) =

American band from Chicago

- Origin: Chicago, Illinois, USA
- Genres: Indie rock Power pop
- Years active: 1984–present
- Labels: Ganggreen Records; Pravda Records; Megadisc Records; B Track Records
- Members: Mark Mosher; Jeff Lescher; Clay Tomasek; Jason Mosher
- Past members: Ken Kurson; John Valley; John Diamond; Rich Clifton; Stuart Shea; Mike J. Jarvis; Gregg Potter

Green is an American rock group from Chicago.

== History ==
The group was started by Jeff Lescher (guitar and vocals), John Diamond (bass and backing vocals), and John Valley (drums). This lineup recorded the 1984 four-song EP The Name of This Group Is Green and the group's 1986 self-titled debut album, which featured 14 songs, including re-recordings of all four songs from the earlier EP.

Green established themselves via live shows around Chicago and undertook several national tours with the assistance of manager Cindy Illig. In 1986, Diamond and Valley elected to leave the band as Lescher announced plans for a national tour. Recruited from local music papers and from among their Chicago fan base were new bassist Ken Kurson (who became a federally convicted cyberstalker later pardoned by Donald Trump, and a 'close friend' to Jared Kushner), rhythm guitarist Stuart Shea, and drummer Rich Clifton. Shea departed following a brief U.S. tour, and the remaining three-piece recorded Elaine MacKenzie, including the tracks "Heavy Metal Kids", "She Was My Girl", and "Radio Caroline."

Writing in Spin magazine, renowned rock critic Ira Robbins reviewed Elaine MacKenzie, noting, "Lescher's voice is astonishing -- a rough but melodic roar that seems to be straining for release" before concluding "The Greening of America starts here." Away From the Pulsebeat magazine's review of Elaine MacKenzie stated: "Best American band, best songwriter, best singer, best LP. Sweep year." In 1988, Green released a single called REM, this after the band R.E.M. released an album called Green.

The group's membership changed again when Clay Tomasek (bass/vocals) joined the group for the Bittersweet EP in 1993.

In 2001 Eau de Vie was released on the Jettison label, owned by Jeff Pezzati of Naked Raygun and Big Black.

The group released its seventh album, the 16-track concept affair The Planets, in 2009. The group now includes Lescher, Tomasek, Mike Zelenko on drums, and guitarist Jason Mosher.

== Discography ==
=== Studio albums ===
- Green (1986), Gang Green Records
- Elaine MacKenzie (1987), Pravda Records
- White Soul (1989), Megadisc Records
- The Pop Tarts (1992), Megadisc Records
- 5 (1998), B Track Records
- Eau de Vie (2001), Jettison
- The Planets (2009), Gang Green

=== Compilations ===
- White Soul & Bittersweet (1991), Widely Distributed
- The Flowers in the Grass (1993), Megadisc

=== EPs ===
- The Name of This Group Is Green (1984), Gang Green
- REM (1988), Pravda (titled in response to R.E.M.'s release of the album Green)
- Bittersweet (1991), Megadisc/PIAS
- Pathétique (1993), Widely Distributed

=== Compilation appearances ===
- CMJ Presents Certain Damage! Volume 4 (Certain Damage!) (1981) - "Radio Caroline"
- Heat from the Wind Chill Factory (Dead Bunny) (1985) - "For You"
- Beasts from the East (Voxx) (1986) - "She's Not a Little Girl Anymore", "Something About You"
- Epic Presents the Unsigned-Vol. II (Epic) (1987) - "Gotta Get a Record Out"
- Mondostereo (The Tinnitus Label/Away from the Pulsebeat) (1988) - "Away from the Pulsebeat"
- R.E.D. Retail Sampler Vol. 1 or 18 Ways to Make More Money (Relativity) (1992) - "Hear What You Want to Hear"
- The Apathy and the Ecstasy (A Futurist Label and Mechanics Records Sampler) cassette (Futurist/Mechanic) (1993) - "Hear What You Want to Hear"
- Whodunit: Chicago Knows Who (No Cigar) (1997) - "Pictures of Lily", "Mary Ann with the Shaky Hands"
- Waaghals '18' 1985-2003 (Waaghals) (2003) - "For You"
- Even More Super Hits of the Seventies (WFMU/Mike-Shell) (2015) - "Superstar"
- Souvenirs: Little Gems of Pop Volume 3 (Wall of Noise/Sound Asleep) (2020) - "Curry Your Favor"
