= Winfried Rief =

German psychologist

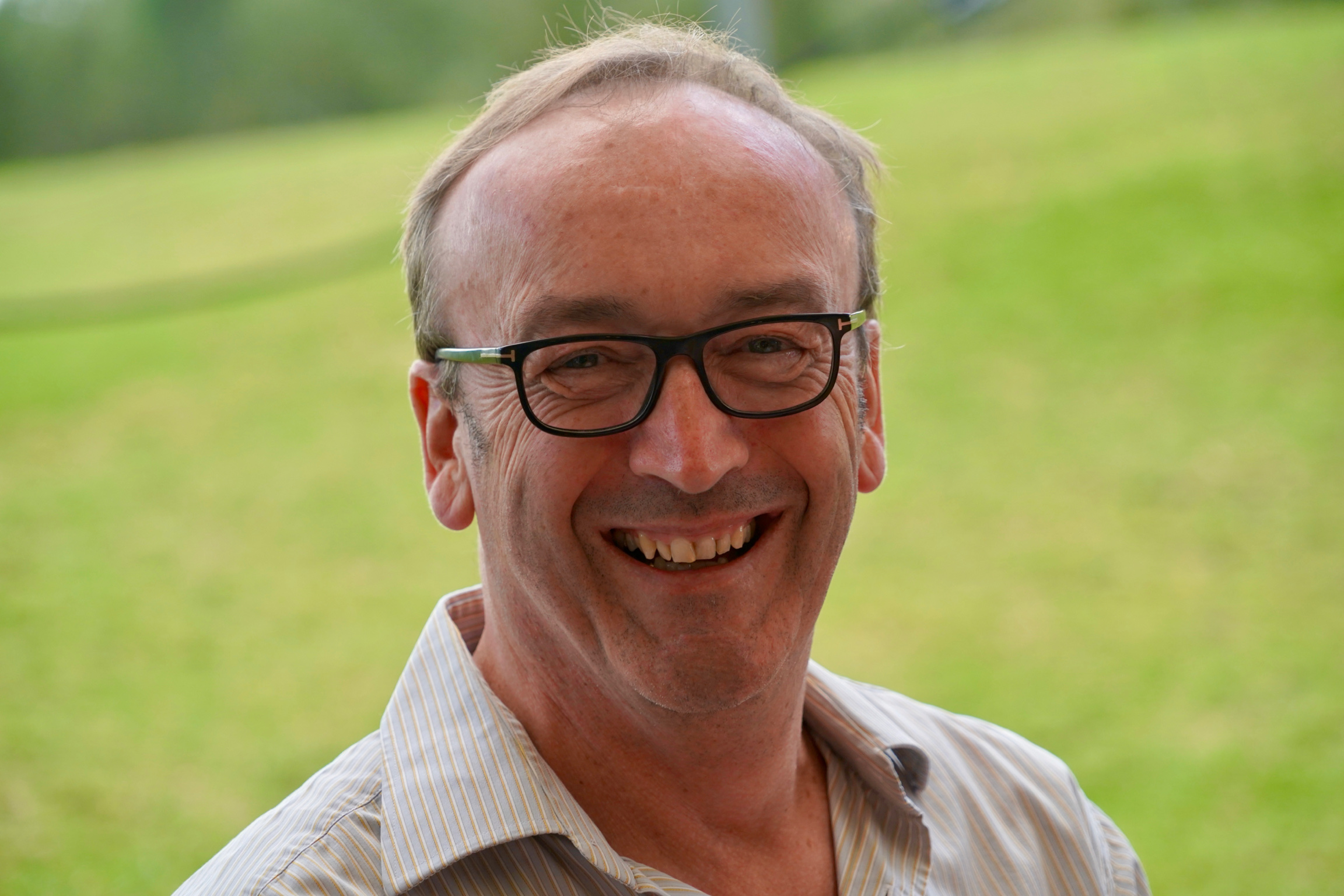
- Known for: Placebo and nocebo mechanisms in medical interventions. Chronic pain with mental and somatic factors.
- Scientific career
- Fields: Psychology
- Workplaces: Marburg University

Winfried Rief (born 12 May 1959) is a German psychologist. Since 2000 he has been a professor of clinical psychology and psychotherapy at the Marburg University. Rief's research examines the psychological factors involved in the development, maintenance and management of physical complaints, including investigations of somatic symptom disorders and placebo effects. Rief is the founding editor of the academic journal Clinical Psychology in Europe.

== Biography ==
Rief studied psychology at the University of Trier (1979-1984). Then he worked at the research division of the psychiatric hospital Reichenau at the University of Konstanz, where he received his Ph.D. in 1987. The title of the thesis was "Visual Information Processing in Schizophrenics". He completed his habilitation in 1994 at the University of Salzburg (title: "Somatoform disorders and hypochondria"). As a clinician, he worked at the Rottweil Psychiatric Hospital (1986-1987) and at the Roseneck Medical-Psychosomatic Hospital (Prien am Chiemsee; affiliated with LMU Munich), where he became a senior psychologist in 1989. Rief accepted a professorship in clinical psychology and psychotherapy at Marburg University in 2000. In the following years, he was a visiting professor at the Harvard Medical School (2004-2005), the University of California, San Diego (2009/2010), and the University of Auckland (2002).

Rief was spokesperson of the Commission "Psychology and Psychotherapy Training" of the German Society for Psychology (DGPs) and advocated, among other things, a revision of the Psychotherapists Act, which was finally approved by the German Bundestag in 2019. He was also President of the German Society of Behavioural Medicine for several years (2001-2005). He was also nominated as a member of the expert commission of the American Psychiatric Association (APA) and World Health Organization (WHO) "Somatic Presentations of Mental Disorders" for the preparation of DSM-5 (Beijing, 2006).

In addition, he was spokesperson of the DFG Research Group on Placebo and Nocebo Mechanisms (2010-2019), member of the DFG Review Board (2012-2020), and of the DFG Commission "Clinical Trials". He co-chairs the ICD-11 Working Group on "Classification of Chronic Pain" which initiated a new classification of chronic pain in WHO´s classification system ICD-11 (since 2013). Since 2024, he is also spokesperson of the LOEWE Center DYNAMIC, a publicly funded cooperation between various universities and other research institutions. He is editor in chief of the journal Clinical Psychology in Europe. Rief is a board member of the European Association of Clinical Psychology and Psychological Treatment EACLIPT.

Rief was awarded the Distinguished International Affiliate, APA Division Health Psychology in 2014 and received a Distinguished Scientist Award from the International Society of Behavioral Medicine in 2014. Rief was awarded the Alison Creed Award by the European Association of Psychosomatic Medicine in 2020. He became honorary member of the German Psychology Society DGPs. Since 2022, he is distinguished "Frequently cited researcher", selecting the top-1% of scientists of a specific field.

== Research work ==
For many years, Rief's scientific work focused on the investigation of psychological factors in the development, maintenance and management of physical complaints. He is one of the leading scientists on somatoform disorders and, per Web of Science, leads the international publication list on this topic. Together with Prof. Hiller (Mainz) he developed the frequently used questionnaire procedure SOMS (Screening for Somatoform Symptoms). As a nominated member of the Initial Group for the reformulation of the concept of somatoform symptom and associated in DSM-5, he was initially involved in this process, but later clearly criticized the concept of "somatic symptom disorders" in DSM-5 presented in 2014.

In 2009, the German version of ICD-10 GM introduced the new diagnosis F45.41 "Chronic pain with mental and somatic factors". This introduction was the result of a working group chaired by Prof. Rief. As co-chair together with R.-D. Treede he also chaired the working group on the classification of chronic pain in ICD-11. The classification proposal of this working group for chronic pain was officially included in the draft for ICD-11 by the World Health Assembly 2019, which will become the worldwide basis for the classification of physical and mental diseases.

Since 2004, he has increasingly expanded his research focus to the topic of placebo and nocebo mechanisms in medical interventions and from 2010 - 2019 he has headed a corresponding transregional DFG research group (DFG 1328), which was transformed to a Transregio in 2020 (Spokesperson Prof. Ulrike Bingen). He was able to prove that patient expectations contributed significantly to the success of treatment, even in highly invasive medical interventions (such as cardiac surgery), and that modifying these patient expectations increases the success of such interventions. However, patient expectations are also essential for the development of side effects. Special emphasis was put on expectation effects in depression. Book publications on the subject of "biofeedback" (Rief & Birbaumer, 2000; 2006; 2010), somatisation disorder (Rief & Hiller, 2011) or on the subject of "psychosomatics and behavioural medicine" (Rief & Henningsen, 2015).

Since Jan 01, 2024, Rief is spokesperson of the LOEWE Center DYNAMIC, a cooperation of universities (Frankfurt, Gießen, Marburg, Darmstadt) and other research institutes (DIPF; ESI). The government of Hessen supports this initiative to develop new models for understanding mental disorders with 15 Bio EUR for the first period until 2027.

Rief was also a member of the initiative group for the foundation of a European Society of Clinical Psychology and is a board member of the European Association of Clinical Psychology and Psychological Treatment. As Editor in Chief he launched the journal Clinical Psychology in Europe among others.

During corona pandemic, he published a website for the German Society for Psychology (DGPs) with information for everyone who has fears and uncertainties in the corona situation and especially when making vaccination decisions.

The site also includes tips for dealing with such anxiety.

- Petrie, Keith J.; Rief, Winfried (2019). "Psychobiological Mechanisms of Placebo and Nocebo Effects: Pathways to Improve Treatments and Reduce Side Effects". Annual Review of Psychology. 70: 599–625. doi:10.1146/annurev-psych-010418-102907.
- Rief, Winfried; Hessel, Aike; Braehler, Elmar (2001). "Somatization symptoms and hypochondriacal features in the general population". Psychosomatic Medicine. 63 (4): 595–602. doi:10.1097/00006842-200107000-00012. ISSN 0033-3174. PMID 11485113. S2CID 44711690.
- Rief, Winfried; Sperl, Matthias F.J.; Braun-Koch, Kristina; Khosrowtaj, Zahra; Kirchner, Lukas; Schäfer, Leonora; Schwarting, Rainer K.W.; Teige-Mocigemba, Sarah; Panitz, Christian (2022). "Using expectation violation models to improve the outcome of psychological treatments". Clinical Psychology Review. 98 102212. doi:10.1016/j.cpr.2022.102212.
- Rief, Winfried; Buhlmann, Ulrike; Wilhelm, Sabine; Borkenhagen, Ada; Brähler, Elmar (2006). "The prevalence of body dysmorphic disorder: a population-based survey". Psychological Medicine. 36 (6): 877–885. doi:10.1017/S0033291706007264. ISSN 0033-2917. PMID 16515733. S2CID 21422595.
- Lincoln, T. M.; Lullmann, E.; Rief, W. (2006). "Correlates and long-term consequences of poor insight in patients with schizophrenia: A systematic review". Schizophrenia Bulletin. 33 (6): 1324–1342. doi:10.1093/schbul/sbm002. ISSN 0586-7614. PMC 2779879. PMID 17289653.
- Rief, Winfried; Broadbent, Elizabeth (2007). "Explaining medically unexplained symptoms-models and mechanisms". Clinical Psychology Review. 27 (7): 821–841. doi:10.1016/j.cpr.2007.07.005. PMID 17716793.
- Enck, Paul; Bingel, Ulrike; Schedlowski, Manfred; Rief, Winfried (2013). "The placebo response in medicine: minimize, maximize or personalize?". Nature Reviews Drug Discovery. 12 (3): 191–204. doi:10.1038/nrd3923. ISSN 1474-1776. PMID 23449306. S2CID 24556504.
- Treede, Rolf-Detlef; Rief, Winfried; Barke, Antonia; Aziz, Qasim; Bennett, Michael I.; Benoliel, Rafael; Cohen, Milton; Evers, Stefan; Finnerup, Nanna B.; First, Michael B.; Giamberardino, Maria Adele (2015). "A classification of chronic pain for ICD-11". PAIN. 156 (6): 1003–1007. doi:10.1097/j.pain.0000000000000160. ISSN 0304-3959. PMC 4450869. PMID 25844555.
- Rief, Winfried; Hofmann, Stefan G.; Berg, Max; Forbes, Miriam K.; Pizzagalli, Diego A.; Zimmermann, Johannes; Fried, Eiko; Reed, Geoffrey M. (2023). "Do We Need a Novel Framework for Classifying Psychopathology? A Discussion Paper". Clinical Psychology in Europe. 5 (4) e11699. doi:10.32872/cpe.11699. PMC 10863678.
