= Ream (surname) =

Ream is a surname. Notable people with the surname include:

- Charles Ream (1913–2010), American football player
- Dwight Ream (1892–1954), American football and basketball coach
- Lilian Ream (1877–1961), English photographer
- Norman B. Ream (1844–1915), American businessman.
- Roger Ream (born 1954), President of The Fund for American Studies
- Tim Ream (born 1987), American soccer player
- Vinnie Ream or Lavinia Ellen Ream Hoxie (1847–1914), American sculptor
