= Elaine MacKenzie =

Studio album by Green
- Released: 1987
- Genre: Jangle pop
- Length: 45:45
- Label: Pravda
- Producer: Green

Green chronology
Green (1986)	Elaine MacKenzie (1987)	White Soul (1989)

Elaine MacKenzie is the second album by Chicago pop band Green, released in 1987 on Pravda Records.

== Reception ==
In writing for Spin, Ira Robbins called Elaine MacKenzie "an album of great accomplishment" that "pair[s] the most worthwhile Kinks influence since Big Star with enough hoarse soulful R&B soul for a Small Faces LP on Paisley Park." He gave further praise to Jeff Lescher's vocal performance, which he described as "a rough but melodic roar that seems to be straining for release." The Chicago Tribune called the album "a minor masterpiece." Perfect Sound Forever wrote that the album "was nearly as accomplished as its predecessor, ramping up the ambition, and letting the frenzy fly." The Chicago Reader called the album "brilliant," writing that it featured the band's "perhaps most crucial lineup."

== Track listing ==
All tracks are written by Jeff Lescher, except "Beaten Into Submission" and "Fingerprints" by Ken Kurson.

Side one
No.	Title	Length
1.	"Up All Night"	4:19
2.	"She's an Addiction"	3:39
3.	"Saturday Afternoon"	3:41
4.	"Radio Caroline"	3:08
5.	"Beaten into Submission"	2:25
6.	"Heavy Metal Kids"	3:20
7.	"My Love's on Fire"	2:51

Side two
No.	Title	Length
1.	"I'm Not at Home"	2:49
2.	"Don't Ever Fall in Love"	3:45
3.	"Fingerprints"	2:14
4.	"She Was My Girl"	3:29
5.	"Youth in Asia"	2:04
6.	"I Can't Seem to Get It Through My Head"	4:25
7.	"I Know, I Know"	4:36

CD bonus tracks
No.	Title	Length
15.	"My Tears Are Dry (Now)"	2:59
16.	"Love On Thin Air"	3:40

== Personnel ==
Green

- Ken Kurson – bass guitar, vocals
- Jeff Lescher – guitar, vocals
- Richard Clifton – drums

Additional musicians and production

- Philippe Christian Bonnet – recording
- Green – production
- Johnny Hell – recording
