= Radiofrequency Echographic Multi Spectrometry =

Medical diagnostic

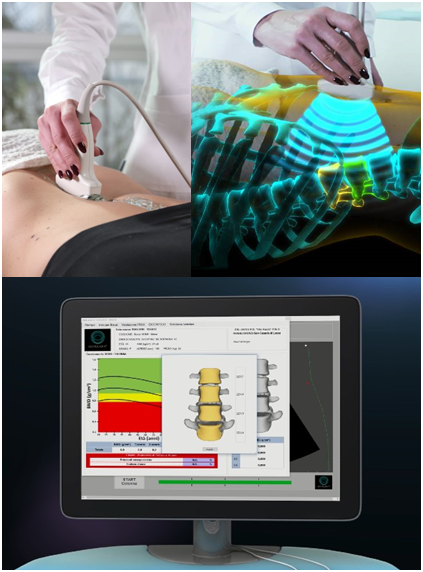
Radiofrequency Echographic Multi Spectrometry applied to lumbar spine.

Radiofrequency Echographic Multi Spectrometry (REMS) is a non-ionizing technology for osteoporosis diagnosis and for fracture risk assessment. REMS processes the raw, unfiltered ultrasound signals acquired during an echographic scan of the axial sites, femur and spine. The analysis is performed in the frequency domain. Bone mineral density (BMD) is estimated by comparing the results against reference models.

The accuracy has been tested by comparing it against to DXA technology.

== Working principles ==
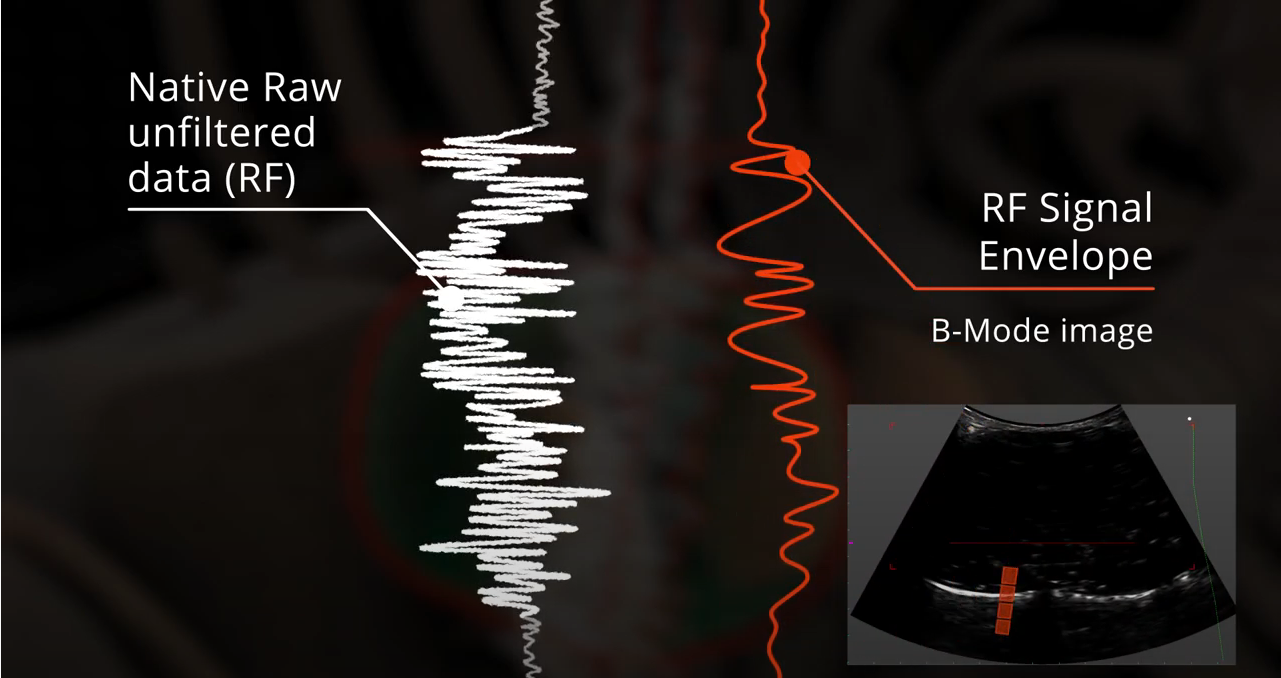
B-Mode image and corresponding raw ultrasound signal.

Traditionally, ultrasound B-Mode imaging has been designed for allowing a visual evaluation of human organs and their features by clinicians; however, this implies that the huge quantity of information carried by ultrasound signals is processed and significantly reduced for visualization purposes. REMS technology instead analyses the raw, unfiltered ultrasound signals by comparing their spectral representation with the spectral models stored in a proprietary database which has been previously obtained from healthy and osteoporotic patients; these models are specific and vary with sex, age, BMI and skeletal site. The comparison allows the BMD estimation of the patient as well as a both fast and reliable diagnostic classification, compliant to the recommendations and diagnostic criteria defined by the World Health Organization.

== Spectral and statistical processing of the acquired data ==
REMS scans on femur and spine last 40 and 80 seconds, respectively, allowing the acquisition of several thousands of ultrasound signals related to the skeletal site under examination. The patented algorithm (see for more details) automatically processes these signals on the basis of their spectral features; each signal can be classified as reliable and included in the pipeline for the computation of the diagnostic parameters or, alternatively, classified as unreliable and discarded. During the analysis phase, the acquired spectra are compared to the spectral models stored in the database; afterwards, the values obtained by each comparison are averaged, leading to a precise and repeatable estimation of the diagnostic parameters of interest.

== Automatic artifact removal ==
If substantial differences are detected between one or more acquired signals and the reference spectral models, these samples are identified, classified as unreliable and automatically discarded: for instance, spectra which are not clearly associated to bone portions but to osteophytes or calcifications. Hence, this approach natively identifies and eliminates outliers, bringing significant advantages with respect to the clinical reliability of the obtained results.

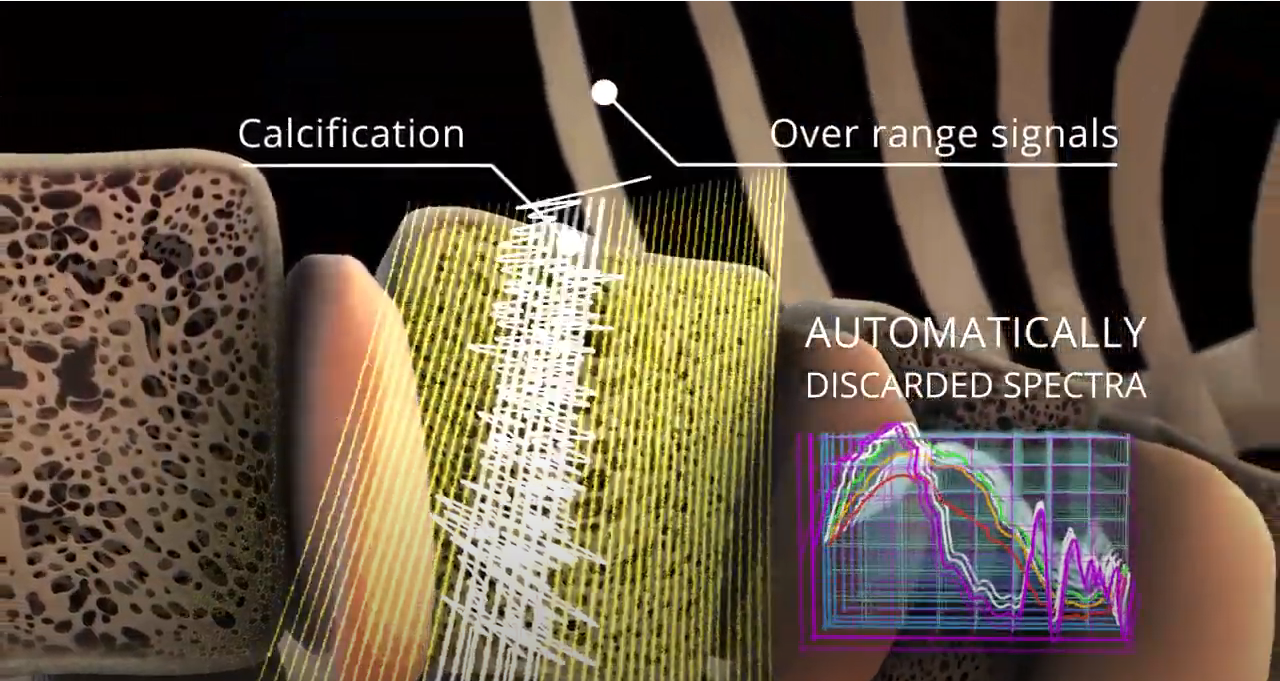
Automatic artifact removal.

== Performance comparison to the current Gold Standard ==
REMS technology performance has been evaluated through multicentre clinical studies. The work of Di Paola et al. has investigated precision and diagnostic accuracy of REMS in comparison with DXA on a sample of 2000 patients. A very high correlation has been observed between the T-Score values obtained by both technologies (Pearson correlation coefficient > 0.93; Cohen's Kappa equals to 0.82 for lumbar spine and 0.79 for femoral neck) as well as a very low average BMD difference between the two techniques (mean ± 2 standard deviations): −0.004±0.088 g/cm^{2} for lumbar spine and −0.006±0.076 g/cm^{2} for femoral neck. Furthermore, specificity and sensitivity of REMS in the discrimination between osteoporotic and non-osteoporotic patients has been evaluated: sensitivity and specificity exceed 91% for both skeletal sites. Additional outcomes of this study are the values of precision and repeatability of REMS estimates, assessed using the Root Mean Square Coefficient of Variation (CV-RMS): precision has been evaluated as being 0.38% for lumbar spine and 0.32% for femoral neck, whereas the Least Significant Change (LSC) resulted in 1.05% and 0.88%, respectively. Finally, inter-operator repeatability has been calculated, which has resulted in 0.54% for lumbar spine and 0.48% for femoral neck. These values are significantly lower than those reported about DXA in the scientific literature and offer concrete advantages from the point of view of short-term follow-up of patients undergoing therapeutic treatments.

== Fracture risk evaluation ==
Observational longitudinal studies have further evaluated REMS T-score performance in the identification of patients at risk for fragility fracture. Specifically, in Adami et al., a group of more than 1.500 patients has undergone both DXA and REMS scans. Afterwards, these patients have been monitored for a period up to 5 years in order to estimate the incidence of fragility fractures in relationship with the T-score values previously obtained with both technologies. The study has demonstrated that REMS T-score is an effective parameter for the prediction of the occurrence of fragility fractures, leading the authors to positive conclusions about the effectiveness of REMS technology in the identification of patients at risk for osteoporotic fracture.

== REMS Technology and Fragility Score ==
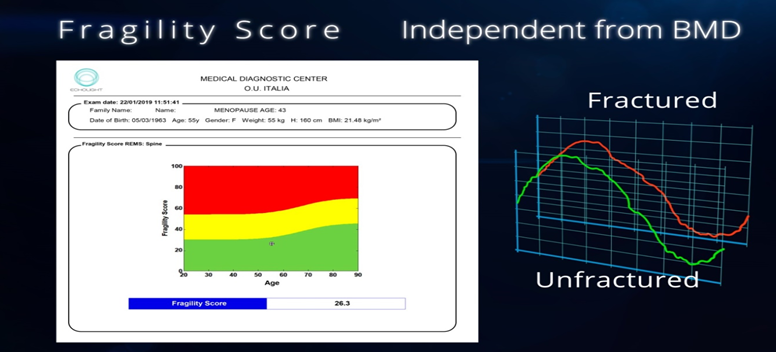
Fragility Score parameter.

As widely reported in the scientific literature, bone density is just one of the components of bone strength thus it only partially predicts bone fragility. In order to overcome this limitation, a novel parameter, Fragility Score, has been developed. Fragility Score evaluates bone microstructural features independently from BMD and it is based on the assumption that a fragile bone structure has microstructural features which, in turn, influence the spectral characteristics of the acquired ultrasound signal, being different from those reflecting a robust bone structure. Fragility Score is an adimensional parameter, ranging from 0 to 100, obtained by comparing the spectra of the acquired ultrasound signals with the spectral reference models obtained from patients who did, or did not, developed an osteoporotic fracture. This parameter has been validated through clinical studies and its accuracy has demonstrated a performance similar to DXA BMD.

== International recognition and clinical use ==
In a recent publication, REMS technology has received the attention of the European Society for Clinical and Economic Aspects of Osteoporosis, Osteoarthritis and Musculoskeletal Diseases (ESCEO). In this work, all the available technologies for bone strength assessment and fracture risk estimation have been reviewed and discussed in relation to the clinical needs currently unmet. In this context, REMS has been considered a valuable approach for osteoporosis diagnosis and for fracture risk assessment, at the same time overcoming several of the current limitations acknowledged for the currently available bone health assessment technologies. One example is the work of Degennaro et al. in which a significant BMD reduction has been detected in pregnant women compared to non-pregnant women for the very first time. Several international working groups has used REMS technology for research purposes: Bojincă et al. has proven the effectiveness of REMS BMD estimates in patients affected by rheumatoid arthritis. Kirilova et al. assessed the values of lumbar spine and hip REMS-based BMD in premenopausal and postmenopausal women. In Khu et al. REMS has been used for characterizing the relationship between body mass index and bone health. The growing interest towards REMS is also demonstrated by the publication of scientific review papers focused on this technology.
