= Review of Indonesian and Malaysian Affairs =

Australia-based scholarly journal published from 1967 to 2014

- Discipline: Asian studies
- Language: English

Publication details
- History: 1967–2014
- Publisher: University of Sydney (1967–2003); Association for the Publication of Indonesian and Malaysian Studies (2003–2014); (Australia)

Standard abbreviations
- ISO 4: Rev. Indones. Malays. Aff.

Indexing
- ISSN: 0034-6594
- OCLC no.: 310953014

The Review of Indonesian and Malaysian Affairs was an Australia-based scholarly journal that ran from 1967 to 2014, dealing with "political, economic, social and cultural aspects of Indonesia and Malaysia." It is indexed in the Bibliography of Asian Studies and included in Informit (database) as well as Scimago and in Scopus.

Indonesian teaching had begun at the University of Sydney in 1958, and ultimately led to the establishment of the journal, which was initially twice yearly. Initially a "very modest, cyclostyled publication issued by the Department of Indonesian and Malaysian Studies" of the University of Sydney, the journal sought to "publish scholarly studies relating to societies and cultures, understood in the broadest terms, to be found in Indonesia, Malaysia and surrounding areas." From 2003, the journal was published by the "Association for the Publication of Indonesian and Malaysian Studies which was incorporated in the Australian Capital Territory." Notable issues were devoted to reviews on contemporary Indonesian politics from KITLV and Reformasi era Indonesia and literature, though the journal also struggled with the preference of Australian researchers to be published in the United States.
