= Reticular erythematous mucinosis =

- Other names: Midline mucinosis, Plaque-like cutaneous mucinosis, and REM syndrome
- Specialty: Dermatology

Reticular erythematous mucinosis (REM) is a skin condition caused by fibroblasts producing abnormally large amounts of mucopolysaccharides. It is a disease that tends to affect women in the third and fourth decades of life.

== Signs and symptoms ==
Clinically, there are papules and pink to red macules that eventually combine to form annular and reticulated lesions. Although they are usually found on the upper mid-back or mid-chest, these lesions have also been reported on unusual sites like the face, arms, legs, and abdomen. There's a chance that the lesions have telangiectasias and are mildly itchy. Although exposure to the sun has been known to occasionally be beneficial, it usually makes the eruption worse. UVA and/or UVB provocative phototests have the potential to replicate reticular erythematous mucinosis lesions.

== Causes ==
Patients with reticular erythematous mucinosis have also been reported to have other conditions like myxedema, hypothyroidism, Hashimoto's thyroiditis, monoclonal gammopathy, and HIV infection. Menstruation, heat, x-ray therapy, oral contraceptives, pregnancy, and perspiration can all induce or worsen reticular erythematous mucinosis. Reticular erythematous mucinosis's specific link to lung cancer is being investigated. Different cytokines, such as transforming growth factor β, interleukins, tumor necrosis factor, and interferon, are known to modulate mucin synthesis.

== Diagnosis ==
Histologically, reticular erythematous mucinosis is linked to a variable deep perivascular extension and a mild superficial and middermal perivascular infiltrate. A primarily lymphocytic perifollicular infiltrate may exist, along with a small number of histiocytes, factor XIIIa-positive dendrocytes, and admixed mast cells. In the papillary dermis, there is occasionally focal, mild hemorrhage as well as slight vascular dilatation.

A characteristic of reticular erythematous mucinosis is the separation of dermal collagen bundles, and the upper and mid dermis are the primary areas where variable amounts of basophilic mucin are visible. The areas of the upper dermis, appendages, and the infiltrate are where the mucin is most noticeable. There might be a few stellate cells as well. Although mild spongiosis and focal lichenoid inflammation have been reported, the epidermis is usually normal. Sporadic elastic fiber fragmentation and mild basal layer degeneration are possible in certain situations. The staining reactions of the mucin are variable. Alcian blue has occasionally produced false negative results; however, colloidal iron staining has been shown to be superior.

Direct immunofluorescence has demonstrated the accumulation of immunoglobulins, specifically IgM, along the basal layer in multiple instances. It may be possible to see focal elastic fiber fragmentation, expanding intercollagenous spaces, and active fibroblasts when the lesions are viewed under an electron microscope. Electron microscopy has also revealed numerous tubular inclusions in keratinocytes, dermal macrophages, pericytes, and endothelial cells.

== Treatment ==
Antimalarial medications are the preferred treatment for REM. After beginning treatment, they frequently result in a quick clinical improvement, but recurrence is frequent. Generally speaking, treating the illness with hydroxychloroquine at a dosage of 200–400 mg/d has proven successful.

Many treatments have been tried, but with varying degrees of success, including oral antihistamines, topical tacrolimus, systemic and topical corticosteroids, tetracycline, cyclosporine, and UVB radiation.

== See also ==
- Mucinosis
- List of cutaneous conditions
