= Tommaso Rima =

Swiss-Italian physician and surgeon

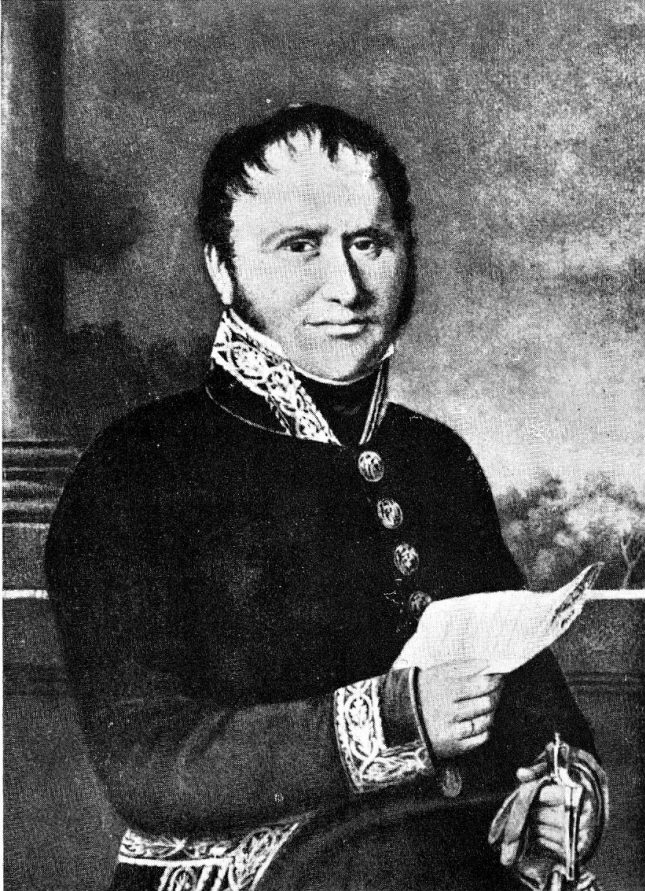

Tommaso Rima (11 December 1775 – 26 February 1843) was a Swiss-Italian medical doctor and surgeon. He studied varicose veins and innovated a ligation technique to manage it, making him a pioneer of vascular surgery.

Rima was born in Mosogno, Ticino Canton, to Giacomo Antonio Gianini-Rima and Maria Xavieria (born either Zanedei or Picchioni from Corsica). He was educated at Locarno and Lugano before going to Rome to study medicine where his older brother had also been. He received his diploma in medicine and surgery at Sapienza in 1798. He then trained at the hospital of San Giovanni, Laterano, Rome until war broke out. He then became a military doctor. He was promoted to surgeon major of the Italian army in 1803 and was involved in organization building, and teaching. He served in 1805 at Trieste and at Naples (1806). In 1806 he became a chief surgeon at Milan, succeeding Paolo Assalini at the military hospital of San Ambrogio. In 1807 he was surgeon-in-chief of Italian military hospitals. In 1814 he became a medical officer in the Austrian army and after leaving in 1820 he took up research, working as a surgeon at the Ravenna hospital and later at Venice.

Rima's most famous work was on the proximate cause of varicose veins and a treatment based on ligation of the saphenous vein and a more popular method was experimented on later by Friedrich Trendelenburg.

Rima had two daughters from a marriage sometime after 1807 but after his wife's death in 1812, he married Marquise Teresa née Lalatta of Parma, widow of a Bergamo landowner.
