= List of Vampire Knight characters =

List of fictional characters from the Vampire Knight franchise

The Vampire Knight manga series and its anime adaptation features a cast of characters created by Matsuri Hino. The series at first takes place at Cross Academy.

== Creation ==
While initially developing the characters, Hino reported that though Kaname was created earlier, at every step in the characters' creations, she found it difficult to maintain a balance between Kaname and Zero as she struggled with fears of the former overshadowing the latter.

Hino has described Yuki as a healing and soothing character, who exemplifies her justice side.

Hino has stated that she borrowed the character of Kaito "from Ayano Fujisaki's Vampire Knight novel".

== Main characters ==
=== Yuki Cross ===
Yuki Cross / Yuki Kuran (黒主 優姫 / 玖蘭 優姫, Kurosu Yūki / Kuran Yūki) is the adopted daughter of the Headmaster of Cross Academy, Kaien Cross. She begins as a human. She wields the Artemis rod to protect herself and the day class students against vampires. Yuki is extremely close to Zero Kiryu, who she becomes determined to help once she learns he has become a vampire. Her other significant relationship is with Kaname Kuran, whom she has been in love with since he saved her from a vampire attack as a young child and later found out that Kaname was her brother and fiancé. She is generally a kind, caring, cheerful, and comedic character, but she is naive and careless, and performs poorly in her studies due to spending most of her nights as a Guardian. She is often kept ignorant by other characters who know more about on-goings, which gives her immense guilt for being unaware of the suffering of other characters. Later in the story, it is revealed Yuki is a Pureblood vampire and the daughter of Haruka and Juri Kuran. Even after becoming a vampire again, Yuki's personality remains largely unchanged. After Kaname sacrifices his heart to the furnace that creates anti-vampire weapons, Yuki gave birth to a daughter that she conceived with Kaname and sometime later, another child with Zero. After her children reached adolescence, Yuki sacrifices her life to turn Kaname into a human and thus resurrect him, leaving her children with a message that describes the world he will see the same way she saw it.

Yuki's name means Kind Princess (or Tender Princess) and Black Master (Kurosu – Japanese pronunciation of Cross).

Voiced by: Yui Horie (Japanese); Mela Lee (English)

=== Zero Kiryu ===
Zero Kiryu (錐生 零, Kiryū Zero) is unique being both a vampire hunter and a vampire. Yuki's close friend and a Cross Academy Guardian, he was trained to be a vampire hunter by Toga Yagari. Zero lives with Kaien Cross and Yuki, after being bitten by a Pureblood vampire, Shizuka Hio, who also murdered his family. Due to the attack, Zero developed a deep hatred and distrust of vampires, despite originally being a gentle character by nature; however, he retains his kindness beneath his scowls, always looking out for the Day Class students in case the Night Class "misbehaves". He has a tattoo on his neck that allows him to be restrained by a charm that temporarily immobilizes him and allows him to enter the Hunters' Association's headquarters. Zero also holds a deep hatred for Kaname Kuran, who tells him that he is simply a shield for Yuki. Zero is deeply in love with Yuki, but chooses to hide it; his feelings left him temporarily confused after Yuki was revealed to be a Pureblood vampire, but Zero continued to love her. In the anime's final episode, Zero lets her drink his blood, allowing Yuki to see how he feels about her. He is one of the few vampires whose body refuses blood tablets, leaving him constantly thirsty for blood; Yuki often gives him her blood to satisfy his thirst. After the time skip, Zero is being considered for the position of president in the future for the Association, and he also drinks the blood of vampires he hunts to satisfy his thirst. He later dies. Matsuri Hino described Zero as exemplifying her hesitant nature.

Zero's name means Zero (for Zero) and Drill Life (for Kiryu).

Voiced by: Mamoru Miyano (Japanese); Vic Mignogna (English)

=== Kaname Kuran ===
Kaname Kuran (玖蘭 枢, Kuran Kaname) is a Pureblood vampire who saved Yuki from an attack by a Level E when she was a child. Kaname is revealed to be one of the original vampires and founder of the Kuran family. He was raised as Haruka and Juri's son after being reawakened by Rido Kuran, who used the Kuran's first child as a sacrifice, making him Yuki's brother and ancestor and fiancé. He worked together with Kaien Cross to establish the Night Class to promote peaceful co-existence between vampires and humans. During the first arc, Kaname spends his time working to protect Yuki, which includes killing Shizuka Hio and fostering Zero Kiryu's powers. During Rido's assault on the school, Kaname destroyed the Senate. Following the time skip, Kaname begins a plan to eliminate all Purebloods aside from Yuki, even willing to place his own heart in the furnace that produces the anti-vampire weapons. The night before he sacrifices his heart to the furnace, Kaname sleeps with Yuki. His body is preserved in ice by Hanabusa. Kaname's notes on transforming vampires into humans without sacrificing a Pureblood are found by Hanabusa, who perfects it. After centuries pass and the furnace is to be shut down, Kaname is resurrected by Yuki as a human; their biological daughter Ai Kuran, along with Yuki and Zero's daughter Ren, passes on a message from Yuki saying that the world he sees as a human is just as how she saw it.

Kaname's name means Hinge or Door (Kaname) and Nine Orchids (Kuran).

Voiced by: Daisuke Kishio (Japanese); Ezra Weisz (English)

== Day Class Students ==
The Day Class students are humans who attend Cross Academy and live in the Sun Dormitory. The majority remain ignorant of the vampires at the school. They attend classes during the day only, hence the name, while wearing black uniforms. Following the battle on the school, the students realized the true identity of the Night Class students. At first they were fearful, but eventually accepted the vampires reluctantly; however, upon the reopening of the school, all but a selected few had their memories erased of this information.

=== Sayori Wakaba ===
Sayori "Yori" Wakaba (若葉 沙頼, Wakaba Sayori) is Yuki's dorm-mate and best friend since junior high. Yori is a very perceptive girl who finds Night Class to be scary. She is one of the few girls with no interest in the Night Class and not intimidated by Zero, frequently joining Yuki to tease him while maintaining that Yuki is the only one capable of dealing with him. When Yori discovers that Yuki is a vampire during the attack on the school, she accepts Yuki. After a year has passed, Yori remains Yuki's loyal friend, she refused to have her memory erased by the hunters, and is now one of the few students who knows what actually happened at the school. According to Kaito, Yori is quite unique for being the human friend of a vampire who hasn't been devoured. Kaito uses Yori as bait at the vampire ball in an attempt to provoke trouble, while she does this in order to meet with Yuki whom she hasn't seen in a year. After the time skip, Yori is seen helping Hanabusa find a way to revive Kaname. They soon fall in love and get married. Despite Hanabusa's pleads, Yori refuses to become a vampire stating she wants to live out her life the way she was meant to. Years later, Yori tells her grandchildren about Yuki and the battle to restart the furnace. In the extra chapter, it's shown Sayori stayed friends with Yuki and Zero for over 50 years before dying.

Voiced by: Risa Mizuno (Japanese); Stephanie Sheh (English)

=== Nadeshiko Shindo ===
Nadeshiko Shindo (新藤 撫子, Shindō Nadeshiko) is a shy, but daring Day Class student, and like the rest of the other Day Class girls, she first appears as silly, because of her giddy admiration of the Night Class. She was considered as brave by her fellow Day Class students after she timidly, but bravely asked Zero to dance with her during the ball. Shindo braids her long hair into two low pigtails and she has clips in her hair. She also wears glasses. Shindo's hair color is very light brown which almost looks blonde, and her eye color is blue. Shindo is first seen on St. Xocolatl's Day, when the Day Class girls stand outside the Night Class. She attempts to the climb the wall to get into the Moon Dormitory and falls, but Zero catches her, leading Shindo to develop a crush on him. Zero rebuffs her repeated attempts to get close to him. She is not seen again until after the battle with Rido's vampire servants is over and is one of the girls who speaks up for the Night Class, one of the many voices of the Day Class girls who voted that they did not want to forget about the Night Class's secret of being vampires.

Voiced by: Taka Fujimori (Japanese); Carrie Savage (English)

=== Kasumi Kageyama ===
Kasumi Kageyama (影山 霞, Kageyama Kasumi) is a student of the Day Class at Cross Academy and the Class Rep of the Day Class. He has dark brown hair and wears glasses. He wears his uniform properly and normally has an expression on his face. Kasumi is in love with Ruka and shows it to her, but Ruka has no interest in him. When Ichiru arrived at the academy, Kasumi was told to take care of him. After the one-year time skip, he has a small role, but spies Yuki walking into the forest with Zero and notes that the Night Class are strange, and is nearly attacked by two vampires. He runs into Ruka and Kain, along with Sayori, Shindo, and the Day Class sun dorm president and recognizes her and his memory of her is regained, but Ruka does not remember him, to his disappointment, but Ruka thanks him for remembering her, and orders the three to go back inside.

Voiced by: Takahiro Matukawa (Japanese); Derek Stephen Prince (English)

=== Fuka Kisaragi ===
Fuka Kisaragi (如月 風花, Kisaragi Fuka) is a secondary character who appears only in the novella Vampire Knight: Ice Blue's Sin. She initially has a crush on Kaname, but later focuses her affections on Aido. She almost dies in a near fatal accident before she begins attending Cross Academy, but is saved when a Pureblood vampire bites her and turns her into a vampire. She is used by Aido and other members of the Night Class as a test subject for blood tablets, and is kept in the dark about the fact she is becoming a vampire. At the end of the novella, she realizes what is happening to her and is killed by Aido rather than become a Level E, but not before admitting her feelings for him.

=== Ichiru Kiryu ===
Ichiru Kiryu (錐生 壱縷, Kiryū Ichiru) was Zero's younger identical twin brother. Ichiru failed to be a vampire hunter due to being a sickly boy and his lack of skill. He was believed to have been killed by Shizuka Hio, but he returns healthy after revealing that he had become the servant of Shizuka and she had given Ichiru her blood to cure his chronic ill health. In spite of his desires, she does not turn him into a vampire and he remains a human. With Shizuka's death, he returns to Cross Academy as a Day Class student by the orders of the Vampire Council and his own desire for revenge for Shizuka's death. During Zero's imprisonment by the vampire hunters, Ichiru visits and shoots him, but reveals that he attained a mortal wound in an attempt to kill Rido, because of his role in Shizuka's death. After he shoots his brother, Ichiru convinces Zero to devour him so they can finally become one, as they were originally supposed to be. Zero buries him alongside their parents' grave. When Zero starts questioning his humanity after the time skip, Ichiru is revealed to live on inside Zero; he asks Zero to consider what is considered "human". He makes one last appearance when Yuki drinks Zero's blood, amused how Zero hides his true feelings.

Voiced by: Mamoru Miyano (Japanese); Vic Mignogna (English)

== Night Class Students ==
Night Class students are young vampires who attend Cross Academy and live in the Moon Dormitory, while wearing white uniforms. They are offspring of elite families in vampire society and are of noble blood, gathered by Kaname Kuran, in order to pursue peace between humans and vampires. They are extremely beautiful and highly intelligent. As they are nocturnal and sensitive to sunlight, they attend classes during the night and sleep during the day.

=== Akatsuki Kain ===
Akatsuki Kain (架院 暁, Kain Akatsuki) is Hanabusa's cousin and considered one of "Lord Kaname's right-hand men." While the Day Class girls have nicknamed him "Wild", Kain is actually mellower than Aido and his laid-back attitude and association with Aido frequently sees him getting into trouble, despite not being directly responsible. Since Aido is lazy, Kain is left to clean their room when he's out, making Aido mistakenly believe their room gets cleaner on its own. Kain is incredibly perceptive and frequently sensitive to others' feelings, most particularly with his cousins, Aido and Ruka's. Kain has the ability to conjure and control fire. He has been in love with Ruka ever since they were kids, but never reveals his true feelings to her because she is in love with Kaname. His protectiveness over Ruka is the only thing preventing him from fully devoting himself to Kaname like Aido. During Rido's attack on Cross Academy, Kain and Ruka fight vampires attacking the Day Class on Kaname's orders. After the one-year timeskip, Akatsuki leaves with Ruka and Kaname, joining in the latter's mission to eliminate Purebloods, though defected when Kaname injures Ruka. After Kaname escapes, Yuki offers to heal Ruka with her blood, but Akatsuki sucks the blood from Yuki's wrist and gives it to Ruka through a kiss, finally revealing his love for her.

Voiced by: Junichi Suwabe (Japanese); Troy Baker (English)

=== Hanabusa Aido ===
Hanabusa Aido (藍堂 英, Aidō Hanabusa) nicknamed "Idol" by the Day Class girls, Aido is well known among the Night Class along with his cousin Akatsuki to be "Lord Kaname's right hand". His fierce admiration for Kaname borders though extremely loyal, Aido has a tendency to overstep his boundaries, which results in Kaname punishing him if discovered (often by slapping him). A noble-class vampire who can conjure and control ice, Aido often appears cheerful and friendly one moment, but vindictive and cruel the next. In spite of his seeming capriciousness, he is a dedicated and serious individual. He is often irritated at Yuki and her naive ways and he resents the fact Yuki is given special attention from "Lord Yournan!", though this stopped after learning Yuki was a Pureblood vampire and Kaname's fiancée. During the timeskip, Aido becomes Yuki's tutor and protector. After witnessing Kaname kill his father, Aido tries to suppress any hatred towards the Kuran family and collaborates with Yuki to re-establish the Night Class. After learning the truth behind Kaname's actions and Kaname sacrifices his heart to the furnace, Hanabusa preserves his body in ice and finds Kaname's notes on transforming vampires into humans. He perfects the process, creating the first method to do so without sacrificing the life of a Pureblood. However, to his despair, he wasn't able to perfect it before the death of his wife, Sayori Wakaba.

Voiced by: Jun Fukuyama (Japanese); Bryce Papenbrook (English)

=== Maria Kurenai ===
Maria Kurenai (紅 まり亜, Kurenai Maria) is a very distant relative of Shizuka Hio. She allows Shizuka to possess her body in exchange for being allowed to drink Shizuka's blood, which would strengthen her weak body; though Maria becomes healthier thanks to Shizuka's blood, she will lapse back into a weakened state in daylight. She seems to be fond of Ichiru Kiryu, as she constantly searches for him after Shizuka's death. She returns to her family after Shizuka's death, and when she sends an owl out to search for Ichiru she witnesses Kaname's destruction of the Senate, and proceeds to spread the news. Maria returns to Cross Academy to support Yuki and the Night Class. She notices the changes in Zero and Yuki's relationship and tells Yuki she intends to take Zero. She becomes closer to Zero, seeking him out and finding the presence of his twin within him. She helps Yuki with retrieving Sara's blood tablets from the Night Class, and tells Yuki that she can't cure Zero's hunger. The two discover Hanadagi's servant, and Zero shows up and orders her to take her to Kaito. Maria encounters Ruka and Akatsuki and attempts to attack them, but they tell her that they are just passing through.

In the English version, Shizuka maintained Maria's normal voice when posing as her; however, when she was serious, her voice would deepen, sounding more mature.

Voiced by: Mai Nakahara (Japanese); Laura Bailey (English)

=== Rima Toya ===
Rima Toya (遠矢 莉磨, Tōya Rima) is one of the youngest Night Class students and she works as a model alongside Senri Shiki. Rima is smart and usually appears uninterested and indifferent. She is often blunt and has a fairly quick temper. She possesses a personality similar to Shiki. Rima possesses lightning or electricity-related abilities. She shares a fondness for Pocky with Shiki. After suspecting Shiki has changed upon his return to school, Rima confronts Rido and demands him to leave Shiki's body since she can tell that he is not Shiki. She is wounded by Rido, but is saved by Ichijo. While injured, she tries to convince Shiki to snap out of his state and calls him an idiot for letting Rido control him. Badly wounded, she is sent back to the Moon Dormitory by Ichijo. Rima is later seen at the vampire ball with Shiki and at a photoshoot at a school Sara Shirabuki was spotted at. Rima rejoins the newly established Night Class, but has since become a critic of Kaname's actions. She becomes worried because Senri has taken the new blood tablets, and persists to stay by his side.

Voiced by: Eri Kitamura (Japanese); Carrie Savage (English)

=== Ruka Souen ===
Ruka Souen (早園 瑠佳, Sōen Ruka) is a female noble vampire with the ability to weave illusions. She has been in love with Kaname Kuran since she was a child and thus remains close to him as a faithful friend. However, she ironically remains unaware of Kain's unrequited love for her. She is also long-time friends to her cousins Aido and Akatsuki. She has an intense jealousy towards any humans that raise Kaname's interest. Her character becomes more jealous and disheartened towards after she learns that Yuki is a Pureblood vampire and is engaged to Kaname. Despite all this, she continues to maintain an unrequited love for Kaname. After Yuki's transformation into her former vampire self, Ruka becomes Yuki's etiquette tutor, though she is still intensely jealous of her. Ruka and Akatsuki join Kaname's mission to kill Purebloods, but later defected when Ruka protects Zero from Kaname and is severely wounded by his anti-vampire sword. After Kaname escapes, Ruka finally realizes Akatsuki's love for her when he kisses her, giving Yuki's blood to heal her wounds.

Voiced by: Junko Minagawa (Japanese); Dorothy Elias-Fahn (English)

=== Seiren ===
Seiren (星煉, Seiren) is a student of the Night Class, and is Kaname's unofficial bodyguard. She appears emotionless, never showing anything more than a neutral expression on her face. Seiren is usually the first to defend Kaname from anyone regarded as a threat to his safety. She even threatens to kill Zero when he threatens Kaname with the Bloody Rose. Seiren also appears to serve Kaname in the capacity of a spy or informant, for an example, she is the one who tells Kaname that his uncle, Rido, has risen. In addition, she practices martial arts to use herself as a weapon against enemies. In the anime, Aido says it's out-of-character for Seiren to lie.

Voiced by: Risa Mizuno (Japanese), Colleen O'Shaughnessey (English)

=== Senri Shiki ===
Senri Shiki (支葵 千里, Shiki Senri) is one of the youngest Night Class students and works alongside Rima Toya as a model. His mother is a former actress, who's become mentally unstable; Senri got his job when someone scouted him when his mother took him to work. He has a whip-like weapon that develops from his blood. It is later revealed that Shiki is in fact the son of Rido Kuran, meaning he's Kaname and Yuki's cousin. Similar to Rima Toya, he is usually impassive, and often detached to the rest of the vampires except for Rima and Ichijo. After the time skip, Shiki and Rima are constantly worrying for Ichijo and his association with Sara. He is deeply loyal to Ichijo, who refuses to give up on him and attempts to reason with him.

Voiced by: Sōichirō Hoshi (Japanese); Steve Staley (English)

=== Takuma Ichijo ===
Takuma Ichijo (一条 拓麻, Ichijō Takuma) is the vice-president of the Night Class. He is an aristocratic vampire nearly as powerful as Kaname, whom he is close to and respects. With his cheerful and enthusiastic demeanor, Ichijo appears very "un-vampire like", lacking the dark atmosphere that surrounds most vampires and making him appear more like a human. Ichijo maintains a close friendship with Senri Shiki and Rima Toya. Ichijo is ordered by his grandfather Asato Ichijo to spy on Kaname while attending Cross Academy, but refuses out of loyalty for his friend. When Senri Shiki is possessed by Rido Kuran, Ichijo is forced to go against Kaname in order to protect his friends. Once Shiki is freed from Rido's possession, Ichijo rejoins Kaname's side and stops Kaname from killing his grandfather, instead asking that he'd be the one to handle the issue. Takuma was discovered unconscious afterwards by Sara Shirabuki, who said that she always wanted "to have" Takuma. Following the one-year time-skip, Takuma remains at Sara's side and cannot return to Kaname's side after being fed with Sara's blood when he was injured, because Sara's blood has been taming him and turn him into her slave.

Voiced by: Susumu Chiba (Japanese); Spike Spencer (English)

== Vampire Hunters ==
Vampire hunters were created ten thousand years ago by one of the progenitors of the vampire race who desired to give humans a chance to defend themselves against the vampires that were turning the human race into their slaves. By drinking her blood, she poisoned the humans, and those who survived became vampire hunters who developed accelerated healing, the ability to sense vampires, and use magic to detect and detain vampires. Vampire hunters are capable of wielding anti-vampire weapons, such as swords and guns, that will only harm vampires and are the only weapons capable of killing the immortal Pureblood vampires. Their abilities were then passed on to their children; however, as a result of sharing some vampire instincts, twins are rare, normally devouring each other in the womb or are stillborn. They set up an association of hunters with rules and regulations that they must follow in order to hunt vampires. The hunters maintain a list of vampires who have become dangerous and violated the rules as defined in the treaty with the vampires.

=== Headmaster Kaien Cross ===
Kaien Cross (黒主 灰閻理事長, Kurosu Kaien) is over 200 years old, the oldest and most powerful known vampire hunter, nicknamed "The Fangless Vampire". In spite of being a vampire hunter, Kaien maintained friendships with several Pureblood vampire families, especially the Kurans. Kaien adopted Yuki and also took Zero into his home after his parents were murdered by Shizuka Hio. When Kaien retired as a vampire hunter (due in part to a promise he made to Yuki's mother) and became the Headmaster of Cross Academy, he established the Day Class and Night Class with Kaname Kuran with dreams of promoting peace between humans and vampires. He later becomes the president of the vampire association. Kaien is an eccentric character who often provokes Zero and irritates other characters with his silly mannerisms, though he is a serious character when it comes to matters he cares about. He carries a hidden anti-vampire weapon, which he uses to fight against the President of the Hunters' Association who had turned corrupt from drinking Rido Kuran's blood.

Voiced by: Hozumi Goda (Japanese); Christopher Corey Smith (English)

=== Toga Yagari ===
Toga Yagari (夜刈 十牙, Yagari Tōga) is currently the top-ranked vampire hunter, as well as the one who trained Zero to be a vampire hunter. He appears at Cross Academy in the guise of being a new Ethics teacher for both the Day Class and the Night Class, but he's really there to see if Zero's become a Level E. Yagari is shocked to learn the Senate's decision to punish Zero for the death of Shizuka Hio and later reappears to arrest Zero. Yagari subsequently joins the Kaien Cross to protect Cross Academy from the Hunters' Association. During the span of the time skip, he becomes the leader of the Association, though Kaien is the public figurehead. When Kaien goes to Kaname to stop him, he is angry at him and tells him that he should let Kaname kill the Purebloods.

Voiced by: Hiroki Yasumoto (Japanese); Travis Willingham (English)

=== Jinmu ===
Jinmu (神武, Jinmu) is a senior vampire hunter who first appears when Yuki and Zero went to the Hunters' Association headquarters. He quickly deduces that Zero has been tamed by Yuki, and voices his reluctance to accept Zero as a comrade since he has been turned into a vampire. Jinmu, along with the former Association President, invaded Cross Academy to apprehend Zero, though he was shocked to learned that the President has become a Level E. Still duty-bound, he led his fellow vampire hunters to proceed with their mission and arrested Kaien for creating the Night Class. After the time skip, he is shown more prominently throughout the series alongside Yagari and Kaien. Unlike Yagari and Kaien, Jinmu refuses to accept Zero's appointment as president in the future, as he is tamed by Yuki, now a Pureblood. He also assists in the investigations of Kaname's and Sara's suspicious activities.

Voiced by: Satoshi Tsuruoka (Japanese); Kirk Thornton (English)

=== Vampire Hunters' Association Former President ===
Known simply as the Vampire Hunters' Association Former President, as he remains unnamed throughout the series, was the former president of the Association. He dresses as a woman, and is grossly obsessed with possessing "eternal beauty" to the point that he struck a deal with Asato Ichijo in order to obtain Pureblood's vampire blood to preserve it. Corrupted, he ordered Zero's arrest as a dangerous vampire and attacked Cross Academy, commanding his subordinates to kill the Night Class. He was killed by Kaien after discovering that the president had been transformed into a Level E after being overtaken by the vampire blood in his body. Yagari and Kaien succeeded him as the leaders of the Association.

Voiced by: Masami Kikuchi (Japanese); Derek Stephen Prince (English)

=== Kaito Takamiya ===
Kaito Takamiya (鷹宮 海斗, Takamiya Kaito) is a young hunter and a teacher-in-training. He is first introduced in the light novel Vampire Knight: Ice Blue's Sin (ヴァンパイア騎士 憂氷の罪, Vanpaia Naito: Aisu Burū no Tsumi) and does not appear in the manga until the second arc when Matsuri Hino needed another hunter character; Hino liked Ayuna Fujisaki's creation so much, she asked to use him. Kaito was trained by Yagari with Ichiru and Zero after his former teacher was wounded. During that time, Kaito picked on Ichiru for his physical weakness and Zero for his soft heart. Kaito is invited to Cross Academy by Kaien to be a student ethics teacher, and he later reveals that his role is to observe Zero. He invites Zero to rely on him as Zero once did on Yuki.

=== Taito Takamiya ===
Taito Takamiya (鷹宮 泰斗, Takamiya Taito) was a young hunter who appeared in Season of Transience, as a Level E that Zero and Kaito were meant to hunt. He was revealed to be Kaito's older brother, whom Kaito thought had simply run away because he hated his job. When he meets his brother again, Taito attempts to beg for his life, only to reveal it was a feint to get the hunters to lower their guard. He damages Kaito's shoulder and nearly succeeds in biting Zero when Yagari arrives to save them. Kaito winds up killing Taito himself.

== Vampires ==
Matsuri Hino's vampires do not follow the traditional mythology of vampires; they are a spontaneous genetic oddity born from humans ten thousand years ago which gave rise to creatures who were sensitive to the sun, but immortal and do not age. The offspring of a union between these first vampires were known as Purebloods and any bite to a human from a Pureblood vampire would turn a human into a Level E vampire. The offspring between humans and vampires resulted in four levels of vampires, characterized by the amount of human blood. A Level A vampire has no human blood and a Level E being a former human; with levels B and C falling somewhere in between. Vampires drink blood, but it is not necessary to survive, and the blood of a Pureblood can grant them new powers. Along with their healing powers, vampires also have supernatural powers, the strength of their healing and powers corresponds to how pure their vampire blood is. Unlike a human pregnancy that takes roughly a year, a vampire pregnancy takes five years, and increases mother's thirst for blood; as result, any human friend a Pureblood cannot visit them during the duration of the pregnancy.

=== Asato Ichijo ===
Asato Ichijo (一条 麻遠, Ichijō Asatō) often referred to as Ichio, is Takuma's grandfather and a member of the Senate. He wanted to become Kaname Kuran's guardian after the death of Kaname's foster parents, but Kaname did not accept; he planned to control the vampire world by having Kaname under his control. Since Kaname did not fit into his plans, Ichio decided to use Rido Kuran, a fool who could be controlled easily if fed enough. Promising the Hunters' Association President vampire blood to maintain his beauty in exchange for favors, Ichio succeeded in being able to subtly manipulate the hunters; however, in the anime, he later killed him when disgusted by his intense desire to maintain beauty. He allows Takuma to attend Cross Academy for the purpose of spying on Kaname and was later killed by his grandson, who opposed his methods.

Voiced by: Kouji Ishii (Japanese); Jamieson Price (English)

=== Pureblood Vampires ===
==== Haruka Kuran ====
Haruka Kuran (玖蘭 悠, Kuran Haruka) was Yuki and Kaname's father and both brother and husband to Juri Kuran. Haruka was killed ten years ago, by his elder brother, Rido Kuran, in a fight to protect his family when Rido came to take his daughter. After their true son, Kaname, was kidnapped by Rido and used to awaken the boy's namesake through sacrifice, Haruka had Rido imprisoned by the Senate to ensure he couldn't harm Juri and himself again. He took in the awakened Kaname, raising him in place of his son. When Yuki was born, Haruka did his best to make sure no one knew of her to make sure she didn't suffer the fate of a Pureblood.

Voiced by: Hirofumi Nojima (Japanese); Erik Davies (English)

==== Juri Kuran ====
Juri Kuran (玖蘭 樹里, Kuran Jūri) was Yuki and Kaname's mother, the wife of Haruka Kuran and the sister of the latter and Rido Kuran. Ten years ago when their elder brother, Rido Kuran appeared, she sacrificed herself to erase Yuki's memories and sealed away her vampire nature, because she wished for Yuki to be able to live happily like a normal human girl. Kaien Cross states that he is indebted to her, and it was revealed that she spared his life when he attempted to murder her when she was pregnant on the condition that he would establish a school where humans and vampires can co-exist peacefully.

Voiced by: Mariko Kouda (Japanese); Michelle Ruff (English)

==== Rido Kuran ====
Rido Kuran (玖蘭 李土, Kuran Ridō) is a Pureblood vampire, Shizuka Hio's former fiancé, Senri Shiki's father, and elder brother to Haruka and Juri. He appears to be insane, having no real motives behind his actions, just simple whims. In order to drink the slumbering ancestor's blood, Rido awakened Kaname by sacrificing Haruka and Juri's first son, who was also named Kaname, but the starved ancestor (Kaname) attacked Rido, leaving him incapacitated and he was arrested by the Senate. Kaname was unable to kill Rido as Rido was his master and instead he reduced Rido to pieces of flesh. Aided by the Senate and the Hunters' Association President, Rido manipulates events from the shadows for ten years by transferring his soul to other bodies and taking control. Rido takes possession of Shiki's body and he goes to Cross Academy. Kaname revives Rido's body using his blood seeing that he can't kill him. Seeing Yuki's resemblance to Juri, Rido decided to take Yuki as a replacement for Juri, who had rejected him. Rido's life came to an end when he was defeated by Zero Kiryu and Yuki, but Rido appears now as a phantasmal 'fragment' of consciousness attached to Kaname, who can only be seen or heard by Kaname.

Voiced by: Tarusuke Shingaki (Japanese); Patrick Seitz (English)

==== Shizuka Hio ====
Shizuka Hio (緋桜 閑, Hiō Shizuka) was the first antagonist to appear in Vampire Knight. Shizuka was the Pureblood vampire who bit Zero, as well as the vampire responsible for killing his parents and bringing Zero's brother Ichiru to her side. She is regarded as dangerously erratic and insane, garnering her the epiphet "Kuruizaki-Hime" (狂い咲き姫, "Flowers blooming out of season princess"). Shizuka shows up at Cross Academy in the guise of another vampire, Maria Kurenai, but is recognized by both Kaname and Zero. In order to save Zero, Yuki risked her life and humanity for Zero to be able to drink Shizuka's blood to prevent his fall to Level E, but Zero stops her by defying his master's orders. Yuki, in turn, prevents Zero from gaining his revenge on Shizuka, and Kaname kills Shizuka to save Yuki.

It is later revealed that Shizuka had been used by a number of vampires for their own purposes. Out of hatred for her fiancé, Rido Kuran, she had sought more power to kill him and refused to submit to him. When she began having a vampire who had once been human as her lover, Rido deliberately arranged for her lover to be listed amongst the Level E vampires to be eliminated, in spite of the fact that Shizuka's lover was in no danger of falling to that level. Shizuka's lover was killed by the Kiryu family, though she was not offered the chance for revenge until Kaname released her from her cage. When Zero learns that Kaname was responsible for releasing Shizuka from Sara Shirabuki, Kaname claims that he had done so for Shizuka to take revenge on the Kiryus, which would ensure that their twin sons would seek the elimination of all Pureblood vampires.

Voiced by: Fumiko Orikasa (Japanese); Wendee Lee (English)

==== Sara Shirabuki ====
Sara Shirabuki (白蕗 更, Shirabuki Sara) was a Pureblood vampire who first appeared minorly at a party held by the Aido family. Sara has taken a larger role in the second arc as the story's antagonist. Sara first took the injured Takuma Ichijo as her pawn and created her own harem of Level D vampire school girls barely within the rules. She killed her fiancé, Ouri, forcibly turned humans into vampires, and attacked a small number of slumbering Pureblood vampires by taking their hearts in an attempt to overthrow Kaname's rule and ascend to Vampire Queen. Sara asks Zero to hide her at the Hunters' Association from Kaname and Zero agrees. She is murdered by the Ancestress when it pierces her through the heart with the metal used to create anti-vampire weapons. Before dying, she asks Takuma to bear witness the destructive nature of the Purebloods and kisses him before shattering into a million shards of glass.

==== Ouri ====
A Pureblood that was murdered at the first party Yuki attended. He was Sara Shirabuki's fiance, whom she killed, with the help of a female hunter she took control of.

==== Isaya Shoto ====
Isaya Shoto (菖藤 依早弥, Shōto Isaya) was the first Pureblood vampire to whom Yuki makes her offer of being a Grim Reaper. Isaya is a long-time friend of Kaien Cross, even before Kaien was friends with the Kurans. Due to being in a fifty-year slumber, he missed most of the events occurring in his the world. During his meeting with Yuki, he questions the wisdom of her mission, but remains impressed by her and reflects on the similarities between her and her adoptive father, Kaien. Though Kaname intended to kill him, Kaien protected Isaya and engaged in a fight with Kaname. Isaya is later asked by Kaname to turn Yuki into a human again, something the ancient Pureblood finds to be a worthy way to end his life. However, Isaya changes his mind on complying once Zero drinks Yuki's blood to regain the memories of her she took from him; he ultimately goes against the idea since there was no need to do so for protection anymore. According to Yuki, Isaya vanished after that.

==== The Hooded Woman ====
The Hooded Woman, also known as the Ancestress, was one of the progenitors of the vampire race that exists today. She plays a significant role in the history of vampires and vampire hunters, though she has only appeared in Kaname's deep past. Being the first of the Purebloods, she witnessed the forthcoming doom and enslavement of humanity and requested Kaname to put a stop to the fellow Purebloods. Her final act was to throw her heart into a furnace of metal, creating weapons powerful enough to kill the immortal Purebloods. She then gave her toxic quantities of blood to the humans willing to fight, with the survivors of the ordeal becoming the first vampire hunters. Both acts caused her to slowly die, with her body cracking and shattering into shards of glass in front of Kaname, who had intended to be the sacrifice rather than her.

During the second arc of the series, Kaname parted from Yuki to murder the rest of the Purebloods, claiming it was "her" wish. However, Yuki later sees Kaname's memories when drinking his blood and claims that it was not the Ancestress' wish to kill all Purebloods, only to stop the enslavement of humans. Deeming that Kaname's actions were selfish and arrogant, Yuki and Zero attempt to kill him at the Hunters' Association before he can kill Sara Shirabuki, who tries to manipulate Zero into killing Kaname so she can become the Vampire Queen. Before Sara can succeed, the ancient furnace containing the Ancestress's heart buried deep in the Association begins to crawl up the walls and pierces Sara's heart. With the furnace containing her heart beginning to dwindle, the Ancestress attempts to reclaim all the weapons born from her heart to remain alive and complete her wish. However, Kaname convinces her that she has done enough and he will become her successor, allowing the Ancestress's spirit to crumble and fade away.

== Reception ==
The character designs and costuming have been mostly praised while the characters and their development and dynamics with each other have received mixed to mostly negative reviews. While some initial reviews were positive, later evaluations were more negative and retrospectives are very critical. ANN's Theron Martin called the designs "standard shōjo fare", but still said the "important characters are still rendered very well" and praised the contrasting uniforms of the Day Class and Night Class.

Reviewing the first and fourth manga volumes, IGN's A.E. Sparrow respectively thought "the characters are written well, have interesting histories" and "the book [volume 4] has excellent characterization". Mania's Chris Beveridge gave a positive evaluation of the supporting characters in his review of the first DVD, "relative ciphers that they are". Also reviewing the first DVD, Christopher Homer had issues with how "aside from Yuki and Zero, very few of the other characters are yet to be interesting enough to really care about them" and how the majority "of the cast are kind of brushed aside". However, he noted that "characters like Kaname, Kaien and the other vampires can definitely become more developed as long as the show continues on its way.". Reviewing DVD 2, Homer thought it "was definitely a step down in terms of" characterization and that, barring Yuki, Zero, Kaname and potentially Kaien, the rest of the cast were uninteresting with the large number of characters not helping, noting that "the introduction of Yagari didn't add much" and that things got confusing with the Night Class, especially since Aido, who "was a big part of the first volume", was "barely mentioned in this one". Homer thought the third DVD largely retained these problems, saying "there are still problems regarding the lack of characterization outside the main three (Aido being a welcome exception)" while Yagari "is still pretty much forgotten" and Kaien "got barely a mention". He thought Guilty pulling some of "the lesser vampires into the story" "brings some interest", reiterating from his previous review that Aido is "definitely the most interesting of the bunch". He also thought the reveal of Kaien being a former vampire hunter was "expected but it was fun to see the goofy Kaien actually was a total badass.".

Reviewing volume 11 of the manga, while Carl Kimlinger of ANN thought it marked a significant improvement in characterization, noted other problems, such as "a good number of previously major supporting players get short shrift; and the new additions to the cast have little do [sic] but lurk menacingly as Yuki, Kaname and Zero's relationships restructure themselves.". In Kimlinger's opinion, the "Zero/Ichiru/Shizuka hate triangle" was a positive of the final episodes of the first season and the English dub's "occasional spike in quality" usually came "from Vic Mignogna's slimy Ichiru.". He also interpreted Ichiru's feelings towards Shizuka as being Oedipal in nature. In his review of Guilty's first DVD, Kimlinger praised the bishonen of the Night Class for "starting to resemble a collection of real people (as opposed to fangirl fetishes)" but criticized Aido's backstory episode for being "essentially dead weight". He also praised the "improved character dynamics" which "make for an even more potent melodramatic experience.".

Retrospectively, the character development has been called mediocre. Fans consider Zero to be the best character with the rest regarded as "either lackluster or deeply disturbing.". The love triangle between Yuki, Zero, and Kaname has been called "one of the most infamous" and has generally been panned. The relationship between Zero and Ichiru has been criticized for being incestuous, as it "doesn't add anything to the plot and comes off as pure fan service.".

Hanabusa Aido has been called "arguably the most beautiful vampire that Vampire Knight has to offer", coming in fourth on a list of the fifteen best bishōnen anime characters. Christopher Homer has described Aido as being Kaname's fanboy and his affection towards him as crush like.
