= Ken Kurson =

American political consultant

- Born: October 1968 (age 58); United States
- Education: Glenbrook North High School
- Occupations: Journalist; Writer; Political consultant; Musician
- Notable work: Editor in chief of The New York Observer; founder of Green Magazine; author of The Green Magazine Guide to Personal Finance; co-author of Leadership, and The Faber Report
- Website: kenkurson.com

Kenneth Kurson (born 23 October 1968) is an American political consultant, writer, journalist, and former musician, who was editor-in-chief of The New York Observer between 2013 and 2017. In 2020 he was charged by federal prosecutors with cyberstalking and harassment, for which he was pardoned by President Donald Trump in 2021. In February 2022, Kurson pleaded guilty to state misdemeanor criminal charges of attempted eavesdropping and computer trespass related to his divorce.

== Education and family ==
Kurson was the son of a traveling salesman of motorcycle parts, and once recounted that "some years were good; others we had to sell our piano and all our furniture." He graduated from Glenbrook North High School in Northbrook, Illinois, in 1986, and is the younger brother of bestselling author Robert Kurson. Though he began studies at the University of Chicago, he wound up leaving college, finding the experience to be "soul-deadening."

== Career ==
=== Early career ===
In the late 1980s and early 1990s, Kurson played bass for the Chicago punk rock band Green. After leaving Green in 1990, Kurson founded The Lilacs with David Levinsky.

A debut EP, The Lilacs Love You, was produced by Material Issue frontman Jim Ellison, who is also credited with naming the band The Lilacs. A follow-up EP, The Lilacs Hate You, was the band's next release. A full-length CD, The Lilacs Rise Above the Filth, was produced by Brad Wood and released in 1992.

In 1993, he headed to New York to break into journalism, and landed internships and jobs at Rolling Stone, Harper's and Worth. In 1995, he began an irreverent eight-page publication on financial topics, The Kenny Quarterly, while working as an editor at United Media. It was to friends desiring financial advice. Later that year, he and a friend, John Packel, turned The Kenny Quarterly into Green. It was acquired by Bankrate in 1999. Kurson was a contributing editor at Esquire from 1997 to 2001, covering investing. Kurson first became interested in finance when he played bass for Green. He took charge of the band's books and contracts.

A New York Times profile in 2000 said that Kurson "has made personal finance palatable for people who might otherwise believe that it belongs on the shelf with Geritol and Dentu-Creme."

Doubleday published Kurson's first book, The Green Magazine Guide to Personal Finance in April 1998. He was co-author of a book with journalist David Faber published by Little, Brown in 2002.

=== Political consulting ===
From 2002 through the end of 2006, Kurson was Deputy Director of Communications for Giuliani Partners, the consulting company founded by Rudy Giuliani, with whom he had co-authored the book, Leadership. Kurson served as chief operating officer (COO) during Rudy Giuliani's unsuccessful 2008 campaign for the Republican presidential nomination.

Kurson hired by the Rudy Giuliani Presidential Committee and put in charge of the Mid-Atlantic Region – New Jersey, Delaware, and Maryland. In May 2007, he was promoted to chief operating officer, reporting to Michael DuHaime, and served in this role until Giuliani withdrew from the race on January 30, 2008.

After the campaign, Kurson worked at Jamestown Associates, a Republican political consulting firm based in New Jersey.

Kurson ran in the 2003 New Jersey General Assembly election for the 34th Legislative District as a Republican. He received 17.6% of the vote and ran a distant third behind Democratic incumbent Peter C. Eagler (with 33.2%) and his running mate Sheila Oliver (31.0%).

In 2010 he was the co-author of the personal memoir of biotechnology executive John Crowley entitled Chasing Miracles: The Crowley Family Journey of Strength, Hope and Joy.

=== New York Observer ===
In January 2013, Kurson was named the editor of The New York Observer by the newspaper's publisher, Jared Kushner. His tenure as editor was marked by questions about close relationship with Kushner, Trump's son-in-law, and to the Trump campaign, especially after Kurson publicly acknowledged that he had ghost written portions of a Trump speech to the American Israel Public Affairs Committee. As a result of the criticism, Kurson said that he would no longer advise the Trump campaign.

As editor, Kurson oversaw the publication's decision in 2016 to end its print edition and drop "New York" from its title, in a break with its past under former editor Peter W. Kaplan.

=== Later career ===
In May 2017, Kurson stepped down as editor of the Observer to work as a senior managing director at Teneo Strategies, a firm run by allies of Hillary Clinton and Bill Clinton.

He was a board member of the payments company Ripple Labs from February 2017 until October 2020, when federal prosecutors charged him in federal court with interstate cyberstalking and related offenses.

In 2018 he founded Sea of Reeds Media, a media company based in Washington, D.C. and is the CEO. Sea of Reeds Media publishes Modern Consensus, California Globe, New Jersey Globe, Rock and Roll Globe, Wine and Whiskey Globe, Book and Film Globe, and Fine Art Globe.

== Criminal indictments ==
=== Federal harassment indictment ===
In March 2018, journalist Deborah Copaken wrote an article in The Atlantic in which she claimed that Kurson withdrew a job offer that had been made to her to write for the New York Observer after not responding favorably to sexual advances from him. Copaken also alleged that Kurson made a joke about her breasts at a lunch meeting during which they discussed an article she had written on her battle with breast cancer. Kurson said he "categorically denied any claim of inappropriate behavior."

In May 2018, Kurson disclosed that he was under consideration for an unpaid position in the Trump Administration. It later became known that he was considered for an appointment to the board of the National Endowment for the Humanities. During an FBI background check, agents interviewed Copaken in June 2018. She told the agents that she had been contacted by a female Mount Sinai Hospital physician who alleged in 2015 that Kurson had harassed her. The FBI contacted Mount Sinai and interviewed the doctor and other employees about Kurson. When the list of appointees to the endowment was released in July 2018, Kurson was not on the list. He said at the time that he had withdrawn from consideration the previous month due to too much paperwork in the vetting process.

In October 2020, federal prosecutors unsealed a criminal complaint charging him with interstate cyberstalking and harassment of the doctor. According to the federal prosecutors, Kurson used aliases to post a flood of negative Yelp reviews about the physician, sent her threatening emails, harassed her with anonymous calls, and delivered messages to other Mount Sinai employees claiming the physician was having an affair with her boss. Mount Sinai Hospital was so concerned about the harassment at the time that it hired someone to protect the doctor for a few days.

==== Presidential pardon ====
Kurson was granted a full pardon by President Trump on January 19, 2021, the last full day of the Trump presidency. The White House said in a statement that Kurson's ex-wife wrote a "powerful letter to the prosecutors" on his behalf, saying that "she never wanted this investigation or arrest," that the investigation only took place because of the vetting process, and that "Kurson is an upstanding citizen and father to five beautiful children."

Elizabeth Spiers, Kurson's predecessor at the Observer, noted in The Daily Beast that the White House statement did not mention the other alleged victims, and that the pardon stood out from the other persons pardoned "because of the ongoing threat that some of the people he allegedly stalked and harassed fear that he may pose to them now." Copaken said she was "terrified" by the pardon.

=== New York charges ===
In August 2021, Kurson was charged in a New York state court with hacking into his wife's computer between September 2015 and March 2016 as their marriage fell apart and they divorced. He was accused of using the spyware program WebWatcher to obtain access to her Facebook and Gmail accounts. Kurson was also alleged to have anonymously distributed his wife's Facebook postings.

In announcing the charges, Cyrus R. Vance Jr., the district attorney from Manhattan, said, "We will not accept presidential pardons as get-out-of-jail-free cards for the well-connected in New York."

In February 2022, Kurson struck a plea deal with prosecutors, pleading guilty to two misdemeanors with the opportunity to have the charges further reduced. Under the terms of the deal, he was required to complete 100 hours of community service, and if not arrested for another crime, in one year he will withdraw those pleas, and plead to the lesser offense of second degree harassment.

== Personal life ==
Kurson lives in Maplewood, New Jersey, and is married to Melody Kurson.
