= Riem (name) =

Riem is a given name and a surname which may refer to:

- Bruno Riem (1923–1992), Swiss modern pentathlete
- Wilhelm Friedrich Riem (1779–1857), German composer and conductor
- Riem de Wolff (1943–2017), half of the 1960s Indonesian and Dutch rock duo the Blue Diamonds
- Riem Hussein (born 1980), German international football referee
