= Jaguari (disambiguation) =

Jaguari is a municipality in the state Rio Grande do Sul, Brazil.

Jaguari may also refer to:

- Jaguari River (disambiguation), multiple rivers in Brazil
- Jaguari Mirim River, a river in the state São Paulo, Brazil, a tributary of the Moji-Guaçu River
- Jaguari River (Caí River), a river in the state Rio Grande do Sul, Brazil
