= Aguaí =

- Municipality
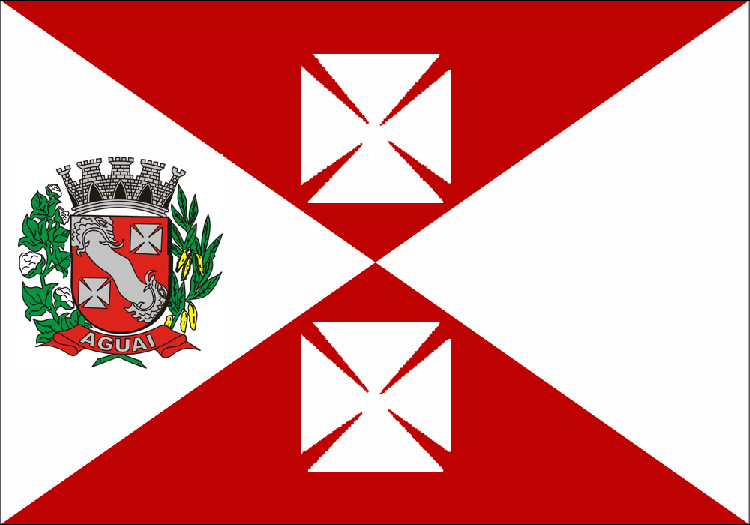
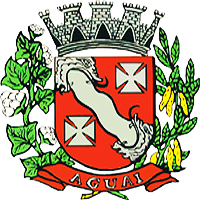
- Flag Coat of arms

- Location in São Paulo state

- Location in Brazil
- Coordinates: 22°3′37″S 46°58′25″W
- Country: Brazil
- Region: Southeast
- State: São Paulo

Area
  - Total: 475 km^{2} (183 sq mi)
- Elevation: 653 m (2,142 ft)

Population (2020)
  - Total: 36,648
  - Density: 77.2/km^{2} (200/sq mi)
- Time zone: UTC−3 (BRT)

Aguaí is a Brazilian municipality located in the eastern part of the state of São Paulo. The population is 36,648 (2020 est.) in an area of 475 square kilometres (183 sq mi). The settlement Cascavel was established in 1887 near a railway station. In 1944, when it was separated from São João da Boa Vista, it became an independent municipality with the name Aguaí.

== History ==
The municipality was created by state law in 1944.

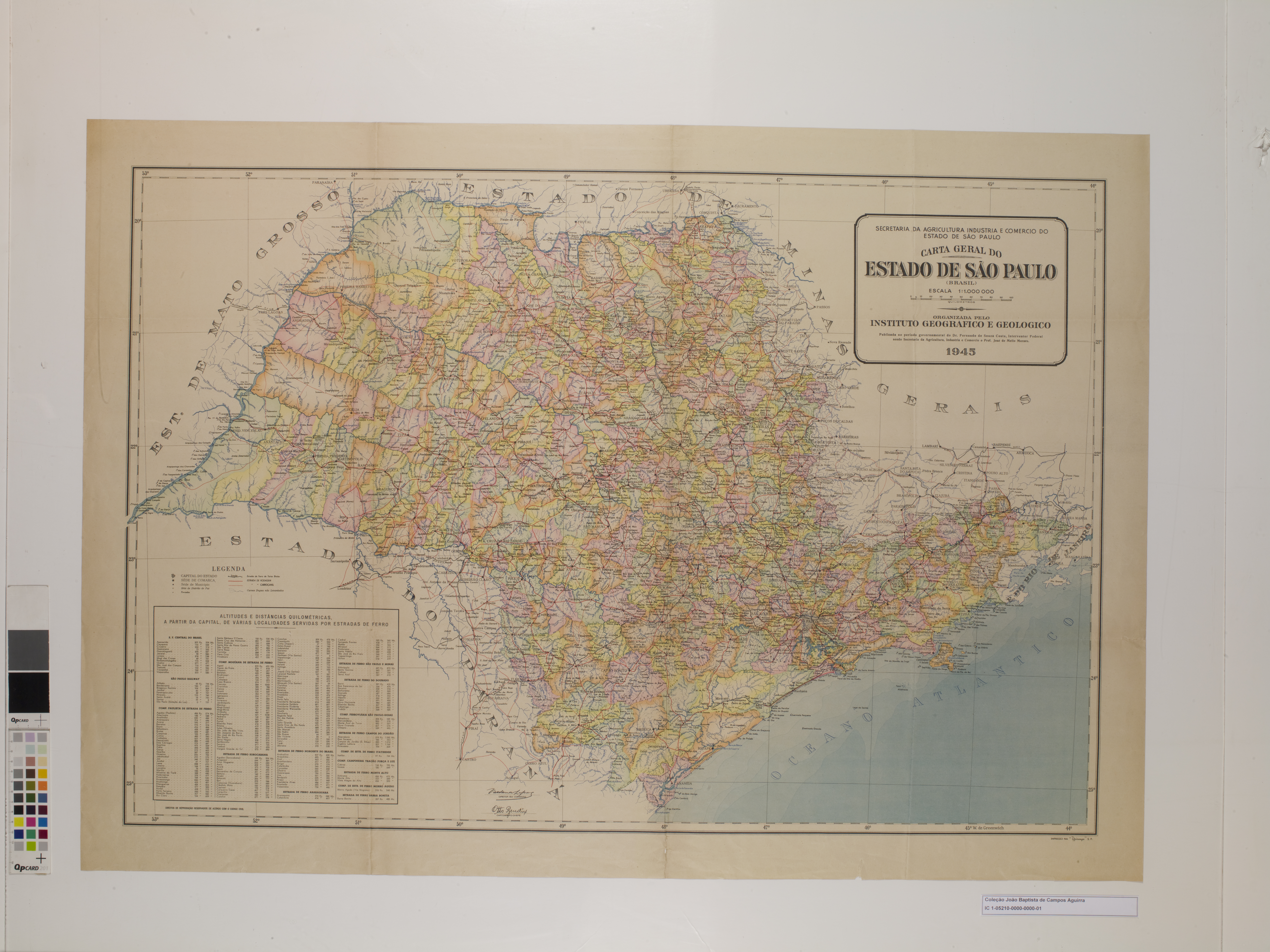
Map of the state of São Paulo (1944).

== Demographics ==
Historical population (municipality)
Year	Population	%±
1950	7,738	—
1960	11,120	43.7%
1970	13,171	18.4%
1980	17,056	29.5%
1991	23,363	37.0%
2000	28,195	20.7%
2010	32,148	14.0%
2022	32,072	−0.2%

== Geography ==
=== Limits ===
North
Santa Cruz das Palmeiras, Casa Branca, Vargem Grande do Sul, São João da Boa Vista

South
Mogi Guaçu

East
São João da Boa Vista, Espírito Santo do Pinhal

West
Leme, Pirassununga

=== Rivers ===
- Jaguari Mirim River
- Itupeva River

== Media ==
In telecommunications, the city was served by Companhia Telefônica Brasileira until 1973, when it began to be served by Telecomunicações de São Paulo. In July 1998, this company was acquired by Telefónica, which adopted the Vivo brand in 2012.

The company is currently an operator of cell phones, fixed lines, internet (fiber optics/4G) and television (satellite and cable).

== Notable people ==
- Aline Villares Reis Football player
- Filipe Aguaí Football player

== See also ==
- List of municipalities in São Paulo
- Interior of São Paulo
