= The Voice Kids (Brazilian TV series) season 4 =

The Voice Kids
- Season 4
- Hosted by: André Marques
- Judges: Carlinhos Brown; Claudia Leitte; Simone & Simaria
- Winner: Jeremias Reis

Release
- Original network: Rede Globo
- Original release: January 6 – April 14, 2019

Season chronology
- ← Previous; Season 3 Next → Season 5

The fourth season of The Voice Kids, premiered on Rede Globo on January 6, 2019 in the 2:00 / 1:00 p.m. (BRST / AMT) daytime slot.

On April 14, 2019, Jeremias Reis from Team Simone & Simaria won the competition with 58.19% of the final vote over Luiza Barbosa (Team Claudia) and Raylla Araújo (Team Brown). This also makes Simone & Simaria the first female coaches to win more than one season, and the first and only female coaches to win back-to-back seasons.

== Teams ==
Key

- Winner
- Runner-up
- Eliminated in the Live shows
- Eliminated in the Battle rounds

Coaches	Top 72 artists					
Carlinhos Brown						
Carlinhos Brown	Raylla Araújo	Carol Roberto	Guilherme Mendes	Alex Novais	Beatriz Freitas	Beatrys Zarb
Carlinhos Brown	Jeane Barreto	Luis Henrique Alves	Cacau Ribeiro	Adônis Tavares	Clara Lima	Duda Soares
Carlinhos Brown	Heloíse Testoni	Henrique Linhares	Iara Abreu	João Vitor Alves	Luigi Oliveira	Luisa Ferrari
Carlinhos Brown	Manuela Lopez	Maria Clara Maia	Marianna Araújo	Nicolly Queiroz	Sofia Cruz	Tayssa Magalhães
Simone & Simaria						
Simone & Simaria	Jeremias Reis	Nicolas Gabriel	Polly Angel	Helen & Heloisa	Bia Abraão	Esthela Martins
Simone & Simaria	Isabella & Rachel	Lívia Valéria	Ana Rízia	André Menezes	Bel Sant'anna	Camila Woloszyn
Simone & Simaria	Emanuely Kamily	Giovana Rezende	Isadora Bertolino	Kawan Pedro	Laura Kaori	Lucas & Vinícius
Simone & Simaria	Rodrigo Seligmann	Sabrina de Souza	Thales Gabrig	Vinicius Casagrande	Vinícius Leite	Yasmim Ruth
Claudia Leitte						
Claudia Leitte	Luiza Barbosa	Malu Casanova	Pedro Miranda	João Nápoli	Giulia Levita	Lanna Moutinho
Claudia Leitte	Maria Clara Nery	Palloma Gueiros	Anabella	Ana Clara Rodrigues	Arthur Ferreira	Cacá Nascimento
Claudia Leitte	Guilherme Eiji	Helô Wanderley	Isa Lima	Isabely Fernandes	João Pedro Chaseliov	Laurah Pessanha
Claudia Leitte	Lavínia Aisar	Luê Aguiar	Lunnah Novaes	Mari Carvalho	Tita Stoll	Yanni Miranda

== Blind auditions ==
Key

✔	Coach pressed "I WANT YOU" button
	Artist defaulted to a coach's team
	Artist picked a coach's team
	Artist eliminated with no coach pressing their "I WANT YOU" button

=== Episode 1 (Jan. 6) ===
Order	Artist	Age	Hometown	Song	Coach's and contestant's choices		
Order	Artist	Age	Hometown	Song	Brown	Simone & Simaria	Claudia
1	Lucas & Vinícius	11	São João del-Rei	"Rapariga Não"	✔	✔	✔
2	Malu Casanova	13	Rio de Janeiro	"If I Ain't Got You"	✔	✔	✔
3	Manuela Lopez	14	Caieiras	"Se Eu Quiser Falar com Deus"	✔	✔	✔
4	Tita Stoll	9	São Paulo	"I Want To Break Free"	✔	—	✔
5	Carol Roberto	13	São Paulo	"Água de Beber"	✔	—	✔
6	Maria Clara Nery	9	Curitiba	"A Bela e a Fera"	✔	✔	✔
7	Kainny Oliveira	14	Guarujá	"Mais Ninguém"	—	—	—
8	Esthela Rodrigues	10	Itatinga	"Rainha do Rodeio"	✔	✔	—
9	João Nápoli	12	Florianópolis	"Saidera"	✔	✔	✔
10	Raylla Araújo	13	Presidente Figueiredo	"Por Enquanto"	✔	✔	✔
11	Renan Andrade	13	Belém	"Reconvexo"	—	—	—
12	Bia Abraão	10	São Paulo	"Oração"	✔	✔	✔
13	Luisa Ferrari	9	Itapetininga	"Fica Tudo Bem"	✔	—	—
14	Jeremias Reis	11	Serra	"Sementes do Amanhã"	✔	✔	✔

=== Episode 2 (Jan. 13) ===
Order	Artist	Age	Hometown	Song	Coach's and contestant's choices		
Order	Artist	Age	Hometown	Song	Brown	Simone & Simaria	Claudia
1	Alex Novais	11	Campinas	"O Portão"	✔	✔	✔
2	Lívia Valéria	12	Patos	"O Errado Sou Eu"	—	✔	—
3	Ana Rízia	10	Petrolina	"Felicidade"	✔	✔	✔
4	Gio Souza	10	Fortaleza	"Promete"	—	—	—
5	Laurah Pessanha	10	Campos dos Goytacazes	"Banho de Lua"	—	—	✔
6	Luis Henrique	13	São Paulo	"Papel Machê"	✔	✔	✔
7	Lanna Moutinho	9	São Paulo	"Havana"	—	—	✔
8	Beatriz Freitas	11	Peixoto de Azevedo	"Caipira"	✔	—	—
9	Iádira Maia	13	Fortaleza	"Dona Maria"	—	—	—
10	Giulia Levita	12	Salvador	"Corazón Partío"	✔	✔	✔
11	Camila Woloszyn	10	Porto Alegre	"Think Of Me"	—	✔	—
12	Duda Soares	11	Rio das Ostras	"Final Feliz"	✔	—	—
13	Nicolas Gabriel	11	Campo do Meio	"Mala"	✔	✔	✔
14	Cacá Nascimento	11	Rio de Janeiro	"O Pato"	✔	✔	✔

=== Episode 3 (Jan. 20) ===
Order	Artist	Age	Hometown	Song	Coach's and contestant's choices		
Order	Artist	Age	Hometown	Song	Brown	Simone & Simaria	Claudia
1	Helô Wanderley	11	Patos	"O Carimbador Maluco"	✔	✔	✔
2	Rodrigo Seligmann	12	Rio de Janeiro	"Can't Help Falling In Love"	✔	✔	✔
3	Giovana Rezende	10	Itaverava	"Fogão de Lenha"	—	✔	—
4	Laura Smolari	13	Severínia	"Mulher-Maravilha"	—	—	—
5	Ana Clara Rodrigues	9	Jaboatão dos Guararapes	"Tropicana"	✔	—	✔
6	Henrique Linhares	11	Rio de Janeiro	"Sereia"	✔	✔	✔
7	Maria Clara Maia	11	Ituiutaba	"Tiro ao Álvaro"	✔	✔	✔
8	Guilherme Eiji	11	São Paulo	"(Out Here) On My Own"	✔	✔	✔
9	Jeane Barreto	13	Magé	"O Sol"	✔	—	—
10	Luê Aguiar	11	Cornélio Procópio	"O Leãozinho"	✔	✔	✔
11	Felipe Luiz	13	Guará	"No Dia Em Que Eu Sai de Casa"	—	—	—
12	Beatryz Zarb	10	Sobradinho	"A Noite (La notte)"	✔	—	—
13	Thales Gabrig	12	Petrópolis	"Notificação Favorita"	—	✔	—
14	Isabella & Rachel	12	Jacareí	"Billionaire"	✔	✔	✔

=== Episode 4 (Jan. 27) ===
Order	Artist	Age	Hometown	Song	Coach's and contestant's choices		
Order	Artist	Age	Hometown	Song	Brown	Simone & Simaria	Claudia
1	Mari Carvalho	10	Castanhal	"Velha Roupa Colorida"	✔	✔	✔
2	Vinícius Casagrande	12	Itaquaquecetuba	"Não Deixo Não"	—	✔	—
3	Sofia Araújo	10	Santo André	"De Janeiro a Janeiro"	—	—	—
4	Marianna Araújo	12	Santo Antônio de Jesus	"Meu Ébano"	✔	—	✔
5	Luiza Barbosa	12	Sapiranga	"Sangrando"	✔	✔	✔
6	Adônis Tavares	12	Barcarena	"How Can I Go On"	✔	—	—
7	Vinícius Leite	10	Maetinga	"Sem Medo de Ser Feliz"	✔	✔	✔
8	Isadora Bertolino	11	Uberlândia	"126 Cabides"	—	✔	—
9	Clara Lima	11	São Gonçalo	"No One"	✔	—	—
10	Fernanda Fernandes	14	Parintins	"Fantasma"	—	—	—
11	João Vitor Alves	13	Cláudio	"Pra Sempre Vou Te Amar"	✔	✔	✔
12	Palloma Gueiros	11	Recife	"Carinhoso"	✔	—	✔
13	Bel Sant'anna	13	Florianópolis	"I Didn't I Plan It"	—	✔	—
14	Pedro Miranda	11	Belo Horizonte	"Sina"	✔	✔	✔

=== Episode 5 (Feb. 3) ===
Order	Artist	Age	Hometown	Song	Coach's and contestant's choices		
Order	Artist	Age	Hometown	Song	Brown	Simone & Simaria	Claudia
1	Nicolly Queiroz	11	São Paulo	"Alguém Me Avisou"	✔	✔	✔
2	Yanni Miranda	10	Juquiá	"Oh! Darling"	✔	—	✔
3	Arthur Ferreira	13	Jaguaquara	"Meio Caminho Andado"	—	—	✔
4	Yasmim Ruth	13	Santa Cruz do Capibaribe	"A Vida do Viajante"	✔	✔	✔
5	Ane Beatriz Ferreira	11	Belo Campo	"Jeito de Mato"	—	—	—
6	Guilherme Mendes	12	Belo Horizonte	"Sorte Que Cê Beija Bem"	✔	—	—
7	Cacau Ribeiro	10	São Lourenço	"História de Uma Gata"	✔	✔	✔
8	Laura Kaori	13	Moreira Sales	"Águas de Março"	—	✔	—
9	Lunnah Novaes	11	Salvador	"Baby"	✔	—	✔
10	André Menezes	13	Tucumã	"Todo Azul do Mar"	—	✔	—
11	Sabrina de Souza	12	Manaus	"Girrassol"	✔	✔	—
12	Kauan Gabriel	13	Jaboatão dos Guararapes	"Apelido Carinhoso"	—	—	—
13	Heloíse Testoni	12	Gaspar	"Ouvi Dizer"	✔	—	—
14	João Pedro Chaseliov	13	Rio de Janeiro	"This Is Me"	✔	✔	✔

=== Episode 6 (Feb. 10) ===
Order	Artist	Age	Hometown	Song	Coach's and contestant's choices		
Order	Artist	Age	Hometown	Song	Brown	Simone & Simaria	Claudia
1	Sofia Cruz	9	Campina Grande	"Tutti Frutti"	✔	✔	✔
2	Kawan Pedro	13	Itapejara d'Oeste	"Se Deus Me Ouvisse"	—	✔	—
3	Lavínia Aisar	14	São Paulo	"Flashlight"	✔	✔	✔
4	Iara Abreu	11	Natal	"Coração de Papel"	✔	—	—
5	Tiago Henrique	12	Rio de Janeiro	"When We Were Young"	—	—	—
6	Helen & Heloisa	12	Andradas	"Para Lennon e McCartney"	—	✔	—
7	Anabella	12	Curitiba	"Seduzir"	—	—	✔
8	Emanuely Kamily	12	Montes Claros	"Mercedita"	✔	✔	✔
9	Isabely Fernandes	12	Jacareí	"(You Make Me Feel Like)..."	✔	✔	✔
10	Luigi Oliveira	14	Osasco	"No Meu Coração Você Vai..."	✔	—	—
11	Isa Lima	14	Rio de Janeiro	"The Climb"	✔	✔	✔
12	Tayssa Magalhães	11	Rio de Janeiro	"Garota de Ipanema"	✔	—	Team full
13	Julya Santos	13	Ribeirão Pires	"Saber Quem Sou (How Far I'll Go)"	Team full	—	Team full
14	Polly Angel	13	Contagem	"Coisa Linda"	Team full	✔	Team full

== The Battles ==
Key

Artist won the Battle and advanced to the Live shows
Artist lost the Battle and was eliminated

Episode	Coach	Order	Winner	Song	Losers	
Episode 7 (February 17)	Claudia Leitte	1	Maria Clara Nery	"Lindo Balão Azul"	Ana Clara Rodrigues	Laurah Pessanha
Episode 7 (February 17)	Simone & Simaria	2	Helen & Heloisa	"Roar"	Bel Sant'anna	Camila Woloszyn
Episode 7 (February 17)	Carlinhos Brown	3	Luis Henrique Alves	"Um Dia de Domingo"	Heloíse Testoni	João Vitor Alves
Episode 7 (February 17)	Simone & Simaria	4	Nicolas Gabriel	"Dormi na Praça"	André Menezes	Vinicius Casagrande
Episode 7 (February 17)	Carlinhos Brown	5	Raylla Araújo	"Minha Felicidade"	Clara Lima	Tayssa Magalhães
Episode 7 (February 17)	Claudia Leitte	6	Giulia Levita	"No Tears Left to Cry"	Anabella	Guilherme Eiji
Episode 7 (February 17)	Carlinhos Brown	7	Beatrys Zarb	"Meu Abrigo"	Iara Abreu	Luisa Ferrari
Episode 7 (February 17)	Simone & Simaria	8	Jeremias Reis	"Se Uma Estrela Aparecer"	Kawan Pedro	Rodrigo Seligmann
Episode 8 (February 24)	Claudia Leitte	1	João Nápoli	"Treasure"	Isa Lima	João Pedro Chaseliov
Episode 8 (February 24)	Simone & Simaria	2	Esthela Martins	"Amo Noite e Dia"	Lucas & Vinícius	Vinícius Leite
Episode 8 (February 24)	Claudia Leitte	3	Palloma Gueiros	"Não Deixe o Samba Morrer"	Cacá Nascimento	Mari Carvalho
Episode 8 (February 24)	Carlinhos Brown	4	Alex Novais	"Alma Gêmea"	Adônis Tavares	Luigi Oliveira
Episode 8 (February 24)	Simone & Simaria	5	Isabella & Rachel	"Uni Duni Tê / Frevo Mulher"	Ana Rízia	Laura Kaori
Episode 8 (February 24)	Carlinhos Brown	6	Jeane Barreto	"Do Lado de Cá"	Manuela Lopez	Maria Clara Maia
Episode 8 (February 24)	Claudia Leitte	7	Lanna Moutinho	"Favela"	Tita Stoll	Yanni Miranda
Episode 8 (February 24)	Simone & Simaria	8	Lívia Valéria	"Anunciação"	Emanuely Kamily	Isadora Bertolino
Episode 9 (March 3)	Carlinhos Brown	1	Carol Roberto	"Vou Festejar"	Marianna Araújo	Nicolly Queiroz
Episode 9 (March 3)	Simone & Simaria	2	Bia Abraão	"Ragatanga (Asereje)"	Giovana Rezende	Sabrina de Souza
Episode 9 (March 3)	Claudia Leitte	3	Malu Casanova	"Hall of Fame"	Lavínia Aisar	Lunnah Novaes
Episode 9 (March 3)	Carlinhos Brown	4	Guilherme Mendes	"O Último Romântico"	Duda Soares	Henrique Linhares
Episode 9 (March 3)	Claudia Leitte	5	Luiza Barbosa	"Tão Seu"	Arthur Ferreira	Isabely Fernandes
Episode 9 (March 3)	Simone & Simaria	6	Polly Angel	"Say Something"	Thales Gabrig	Yasmin Ruth
Episode 9 (March 3)	Carlinhos Brown	7	Beatriz Freitas	"Estúpido Cupido"	Cacau Ribeiro	Sofia Cruz
Episode 9 (March 3)	Claudia Leitte	8	Pedro Miranda	"Sá Marina"	Helô Wanderley	Luê Aguiar

== Live shows ==
=== Elimination chart ===
Artist's info

- Artist from Team Brown
- Artist from Team Simone & Simaria
- Artist from Team Claudia

Result details

- Artist was the winner
- Artist was runner-up
- Artist advanced on public's votes
- Artist was saved by coach
- Artist advanced to the final
- Artist was eliminated

Live show results per week
Artist	Week 1	Week 2	Week 3	Week 4	Week 5
Jeremias Reis		Safe	Safe	Advanced	Winner
Luiza Barbosa		Safe	Safe	Advanced	Runner-up
Raylla Araújo	Safe		Safe	Advanced	Runner-up
Carol Roberto		Safe	Safe	Eliminated	Eliminated (week 4)
Guilherme Mendes		Safe	Safe	Eliminated	Eliminated (week 4)
Malu Casanova	Safe		Safe	Eliminated	Eliminated (week 4)
Nicolas Gabriel	Safe		Safe	Eliminated	Eliminated (week 4)
Pedro Miranda	Safe		Safe	Eliminated	Eliminated (week 4)
Polly Angel	Safe		Safe	Eliminated	Eliminated (week 4)
Alex Novais	Safe		Eliminated	Eliminated (week 3)	
Helen & Heloisa		Safe	Eliminated	Eliminated (week 3)	
João Nápoli		Safe	Eliminated	Eliminated (week 3)	
Beatriz Freitas		Eliminated	Eliminated (week 2)		
Esthela Martins		Eliminated	Eliminated (week 2)		
Giulia Levita		Eliminated	Eliminated (week 2)		
Jeane Barreto		Eliminated	Eliminated (week 2)		
Lívia Valéria		Eliminated	Eliminated (week 2)		
Palloma Gueiros		Eliminated	Eliminated (week 2)		
Beatrys Zarb	Eliminated	Eliminated (week 1)			
Bia Abraão	Eliminated	Eliminated (week 1)			
Isabella & Rachel	Eliminated	Eliminated (week 1)			
Lanna Moutinho	Eliminated	Eliminated (week 1)			
Luis Henrique Alves	Eliminated	Eliminated (week 1)			
Maria Clara Nery	Eliminated	Eliminated (week 1)			

=== Week 1 ===
==== Showdown 1 ====
Episode	Coach	Order	Artist	Song	Result
Episode 10 (March 10)
Episode 10 (March 10)	Simone & Simaria	1	Bia Abraão	"O Pato"	Eliminated
Episode 10 (March 10)	Simone & Simaria	2	Isabella & Rachel	"Got to Be Real"	Eliminated
Episode 10 (March 10)	Simone & Simaria	3	Nicolas Gabriel	"Atrasadinha"	Public's vote (45.00%)
Episode 10 (March 10)	Simone & Simaria	4	Polly Angel	"Fall in Line"	Coach's choice
Episode 10 (March 10)	Carlinhos Brown	5	Alex Novais	"Linda Demais"	Coach's choice
Episode 10 (March 10)	Carlinhos Brown	6	Beatrys Zarb	"Versos Simples"	Eliminated
Episode 10 (March 10)	Carlinhos Brown	7	Luis Henrique Alves	"Ive Brussel"	Eliminated
Episode 10 (March 10)	Carlinhos Brown	8	Raylla Araújo	"Zero a Dez"	Public's vote (37.11%)
Episode 10 (March 10)	Claudia Leitte	9	Lanna Moutinho	"Pesadão"	Eliminated
Episode 10 (March 10)	Claudia Leitte	10	Malu Casanova	"Dangerous Woman"	Coach's choice
Episode 10 (March 10)	Claudia Leitte	11	Maria Clara Nery	"João e Maria"	Eliminated
Episode 10 (March 10)	Claudia Leitte	12	Pedro Miranda	"Stay with Me"	Public's vote (33.74%)

=== Week 2 ===
==== Showdown 2 ====
Episode	Coach	Order	Artist	Song	Result
Episode 11 (March 17)
Episode 11 (March 17)	Carlinhos Brown	1	Beatriz Freitas	"Man! I Feel Like a Woman!"	Eliminated
Episode 11 (March 17)	Carlinhos Brown	2	Carol Roberto	"Dona de Mim"	Coach's choice
Episode 11 (March 17)	Carlinhos Brown	3	Guilherme Mendes	"Hello"	Public's vote (44.90%)
Episode 11 (March 17)	Carlinhos Brown	4	Jeane Barreto	"Amado"	Eliminated
Episode 11 (March 17)	Claudia Leitte	5	Giulia Levita	"Price Tag"	Eliminated
Episode 11 (March 17)	Claudia Leitte	6	João Nápoli	"Counting Stars"	Coach's choice
Episode 11 (March 17)	Claudia Leitte	7	Luiza Barbosa	"Força Estranha"	Public's vote (45.98%)
Episode 11 (March 17)	Claudia Leitte	8	Palloma Gueiros	"Maria, Maria"	Eliminated
Episode 11 (March 17)	Simone & Simaria	9	Esthela Martins	"Pura Emoção"	Eliminated
Episode 11 (March 17)	Simone & Simaria	10	Helen & Heloisa	"Day Tripper"	Coach's choice
Episode 11 (March 17)	Simone & Simaria	11	Jeremias Reis	"Chuva de Arroz"	Public's vote (50.59%)
Episode 11 (March 17)	Simone & Simaria	12	Lívia Valéria	"Asa Branca"	Eliminated

=== Week 3 ===
==== Quarterfinals ====
Episode	Coach	Order	Artist	Song	Result
Episode 12 (March 24)
Episode 12 (March 24)	Claudia Leitte	1	João Nápoli	"Anna Júlia"	Eliminated
Episode 12 (March 24)	Claudia Leitte	2	Luiza Barbosa	"Malandragem"	Public's vote (59.68%)
Episode 12 (March 24)	Claudia Leitte	3	Malu Casanova	"Coleção"	Coach's choice
Episode 12 (March 24)	Claudia Leitte	4	Pedro Miranda	"Uptown Funk"	Coach's choice
Episode 12 (March 24)	Simone & Simaria	5	Helen & Heloisa	"Sapato Velho"	Eliminated
Episode 12 (March 24)	Simone & Simaria	6	Jeremias Reis	"Apenas Mais Uma de Amor"	Public's vote (70.43%)
Episode 12 (March 24)	Simone & Simaria	7	Nicolas Gabriel	"Cem Mil"	Coach's choice
Episode 12 (March 24)	Simone & Simaria	8	Polly Angel	"Confident"	Coach's choice
Episode 12 (March 24)	Carlinhos Brown	9	Alex Novais	"Simples e Romântico"	Eliminated
Episode 12 (March 24)	Carlinhos Brown	10	Carol Roberto	"Maria Maria"	Coach's choice
Episode 12 (March 24)	Carlinhos Brown	11	Guilherme Mendes	"Hero"	Coach's choice
Episode 12 (March 24)	Carlinhos Brown	12	Raylla Araújo	"Céu Azul"	Public's vote (42.51%)

=== Week 4 ===
==== Semifinals ====
Episode	Coach	Order	Artist	Song	Result		
Episode	Coach	Order	Artist	Song	Public points	Coach points	Total points
Episode 13 (April 7)
Episode 13 (April 7)	Carlinhos Brown	1	Carol Roberto	"Superstition"	11.71	00.00	11.71
Episode 13 (April 7)	Carlinhos Brown	2	Guilherme Mendes	"Te Esperando"	33.83	00.00	33.83
Episode 13 (April 7)	Carlinhos Brown	3	Raylla Araújo	"Amor I Love You"	54.46	20.00	74.46
Episode 13 (April 7)	Claudia Leitte	4	Luiza Barbosa	"Travessia"	72.14	20.00	92.14
Episode 13 (April 7)	Claudia Leitte	5	Malu Casanova	"I'll Never Love Again"	09.09	00.00	09.09
Episode 13 (April 7)	Claudia Leitte	6	Pedro Miranda	"Believe"	19.77	00.00	19.77
Episode 13 (April 7)	Simone & Simaria	7	Jeremias Reis	"Pétala"	75.66	20.00	95.66
Episode 13 (April 7)	Simone & Simaria	8	Nicolas Gabriel	"É com Ela que Eu Estou"	16.46	00.00	16.46
Episode 13 (April 7)	Simone & Simaria	9	Polly Angel	"Garganta"	07.88	00.00	07.88

=== Week 5 ===
==== Finals ====
Episode	Coach	Artist	Order	Song	Order	Celebrity duet	Order	Song	Result
Episode 14 (April 14)
Episode 14 (April 14)	Simone & Simaria	Jeremias Reis	1	"Oh Happy Day"	4	"Deixa" (with Vitor Kley)	7	"Tudo Que Você Quiser"	Winner (58.19%)
Episode 14 (April 14)	Claudia Leitte	Luiza Barbosa	2	"Como Nossos Pais"	5	"Palco" (with Iza)	8	"Pais e Filhos"	Runner-up
Episode 14 (April 14)	Carlinhos Brown	Raylla Araújo	3	"Bate Coração"	6	"Velha Infância" (with Melim)	9	"Se Eu Não Te Amasse Tanto Assim"	Runner-up

== Ratings and reception ==
=== Brazilian ratings ===
All numbers are in points and provided by Kantar Ibope Media.

Episode	Title	Air date	Timeslot	SP viewers (in points)	BR viewers (in points)	Source
1	The Blind Auditions 1	January 6, 2019	Sunday 2:00 p.m. (BRST)	15.3	17.9	
2	The Blind Auditions 2	January 13, 2019	Sunday 2:00 p.m. (BRST)	15.9	18.0	
3	The Blind Auditions 3	January 20, 2019	Sunday 2:00 p.m. (BRST)	15.5	18.3	
4	The Blind Auditions 4	January 27, 2019	Sunday 2:00 p.m. (BRST)	16.8	18.9	
5	The Blind Auditions 5	February 3, 2019	Sunday 2:00 p.m. (BRST)	16.6	19.3	
6	The Blind Auditions 6	February 10, 2019	Sunday 2:00 p.m. (BRST)	17.4	19.4	
7	The Battles 1	February 17, 2019	Sunday 1:00 p.m. (BRT)	17.6	19.9	
8	The Battles 2	February 24, 2019	Sunday 1:00 p.m. (BRT)	17.5	19.4	
9	The Battles 3	March 3, 2019	Sunday 1:00 p.m. (BRT)	15.9	16.1	
10	Showdown 1	March 10, 2019	Sunday 1:00 p.m. (BRT)	15.0	—N/a	
11	Showdown 2	March 17, 2019	Sunday 1:00 p.m. (BRT)	14.0	—N/a	
12	Quarterfinals	March 24, 2019	Sunday 1:00 p.m. (BRT)	14.9	—N/a	
13	Semifinals	April 7, 2019	Sunday 1:00 p.m. (BRT)	14.0	—N/a	
14	Finals	April 14, 2019	Sunday 1:00 p.m. (BRT)	17.8	—N/a	

- In 2019, each point represents 254.892 households in 15 market cities in Brazil (73.015 households in São Paulo).
