= Seamax Aircraft =

Airplane manufacturer in the Brazil

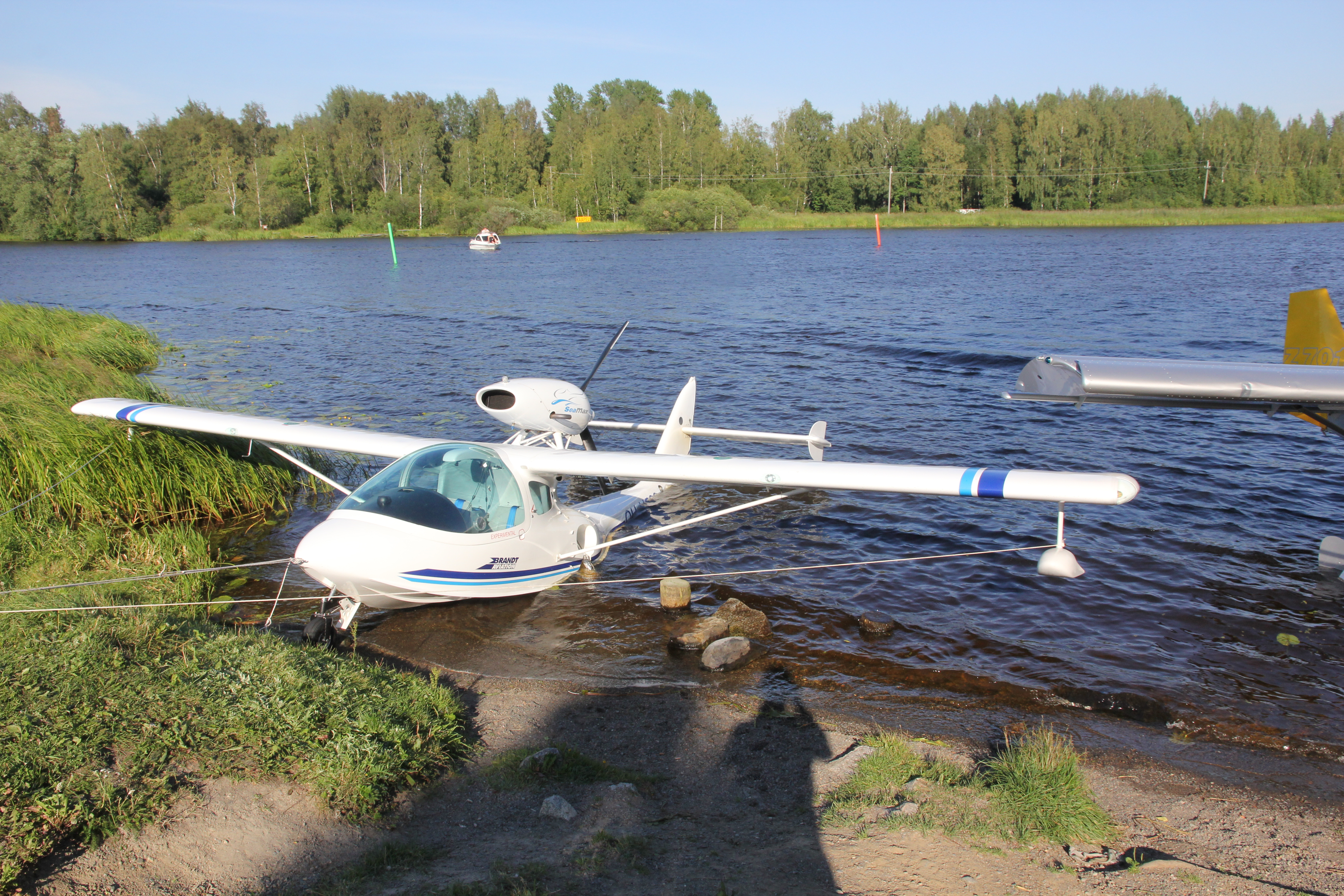
- Company type: Private
- Industry: Aerospace
- Founded: 1997
- Founder: Miguel Rosário
- Headquarters: São João da Boa Vista, São Paulo, Brazil
- Products: Airplanes
- Website: https://www.seamaxaircraft.com/

Seamax Aircraft is a Brazilian manufacturer of amphibious light sport aircraft (LSA) based in São João da Boa Vista, São Paulo.

== History ==
The company was founded to produce amphibious aircraft in 1997, by designer and engineer Miguel Rosário and located in the metropolitan area of Rio de Janeiro. In 2001 the company started production of the Seamax M-22 based on a proof of concept prototype aircraft that had first flown in 2000. In October 2020 the company opened a factory in the United States, the sol location building the Seamax M-22.

== Aircraft ==
Summary of aircraft built by Seamax Aircraft (2018)
Model name	First flight	Number built	Type
Seamax M-22	2000	160	Piston
