= Jaguari River =

Jaguari River may refer to:

- Jaguari River (Caí River)
- Jaguari River (Ibicuí River)
- Jaguari River (Paraíba do Sul)
- Jaguari River (Piracicaba River)

== See also ==
- Jaguari Mirim River
- Jaguari
