= Roger Abdelmassih =

Brazilian physician (born 1943)

- Born: 3 October 1943 (age 82); São João da Boa Vista, São Paulo, Brazil

Roger Abdelmassih (born 3 October 1943) is a Brazilian former physician, an expert on human reproduction, and one of the pioneers of in-vitro fertilization in Brazil. In early 2009 he was accused of sexually abusing sedated patients. Abdelmassih was sentenced to 278 years in prison for 52 rapes and 39 attempted sexual abuses on women.

== Biography ==
Abdelmassih was born in São João da Boa Vista, São Paulo to Lebanese parents. Over the course of his medical career, he ran a clinic in an upscale area of the state capital and became nationally known for treating the wives of celebrities such as Pelé, the former president Fernando Collor, comedian Tom Cavalcante and the Senator Renan Calheiros. One of his most publicized cases was the twin daughters of the television presenter Gugu Liberato.

== Accusation of sexual abuse ==
Beginning in early 2009, several sources in the Brazilian press reported allegations that the doctor had sexually abused patients, while Abdelmassih denied the charges. There were more than 60 complaints from former patients in three different states. Abdelmassih denied the charges, saying he was being pursued by dissatisfied clients and competitors trying to frame him.

On 17 August 2009, Bruno Paes Stranforini, Judge of the 16th Criminal Court of São Paulo, ordered Abdelmassih's arrest. On 24 December, after four months in jail, Abdelmassih was released after Gilmar Mendes, the president of the Supreme Federal Court, granted him habeas corpus, revoking his preventive custody.

Roger Abdelmassih had his professional registration revoked on 20 May 2011, and was sentenced on 23 November 2010, to 278 years in prison by Judge Kenarik Boujikian Felippe of the 16th Criminal Court of São Paulo. He was charged with raping 56 patients in his clinic.

Abdelmassih was initially denied the right to appeal his conviction before being imprisoned, but was eventually granted that right. However, after news that he would try to renew his passport, his arrest was requested once again, as it was believed that he intended to flee the country. Before he could be captured, he fled in early 2011, and appeared on the list of criminals wanted by Interpol as well as the list of 25 most wanted criminals of the Civil Police of São Paulo.

It was initially assumed that Abdelmassih had fled over the border into Paraguay and then Uruguay and used a false passport to go from there to Lebanon, with which Brazil has no extradition treaty. Abdelmassih had recently married a former prosecutor of the republic, Larissa Maria Sacco, 36 years his junior; they have twin sons. She resigned her office in 2011 and fled with her husband.

== Arrest ==
After being sought by the Brazilian police for more than three years, Roger Abdelmassih was arrested by federal police on the afternoon of Tuesday, 19 August 2014, at 13:25 in Asunción, the capital of Paraguay, near the school where the couple's children were enrolled. The following day he was returned to Brazil, and immediately imprisoned in the Penitentiary II Tremembé.

Abdelmassih's lawyers declined to comment on his arrest. A statement issued by former Minister of Justice Márcio Thomaz Bastos and José Luis Oliveira Lima stated that they were still awaiting the outcome of an appeal to the Court of Justice of São Paulo against the initial conviction. Even though Abdelmassih has fled, the lawyers can still appeal to the higher courts in Brasília. The São Paulo State Prosecutor also appealed to increase the penalty, which totals 278 years in prison. Brazilian law forbids imprisonment to exceed 30 years.

== Popular culture ==
Episode 8 of Season 7 of the series Investigação Criminal (available on Prime Video and Claro TV), which depicts the case of the former doctor, was released on April 8, 2018.

TV Globo's series Assédio, based on the book A Clínica – A Farsa e os Crimes de Roger Abdelmassih by Vicente Vilardaga, was released on 21 September 2018, the former doctor is played by Antônio Calloni.

The Globoplay documentary Assédio.Doc was released on April 30, 2019.

The documentary miniseries Abdelmassih: Do Milagre ao Crime was released on July 9, 2022, on HBO Max and Prime Video.

The Prime Video's series Tremembé, based on the book Tremembé: O Presídio dos Famosos by Ullisses Campbell, was released on October 31, 2025, the former doctor is played by Anselmo Vasconcelos.
