= Aline (footballer, born 1989) =

Brazilian footballer (born 1989)

Aline Reis
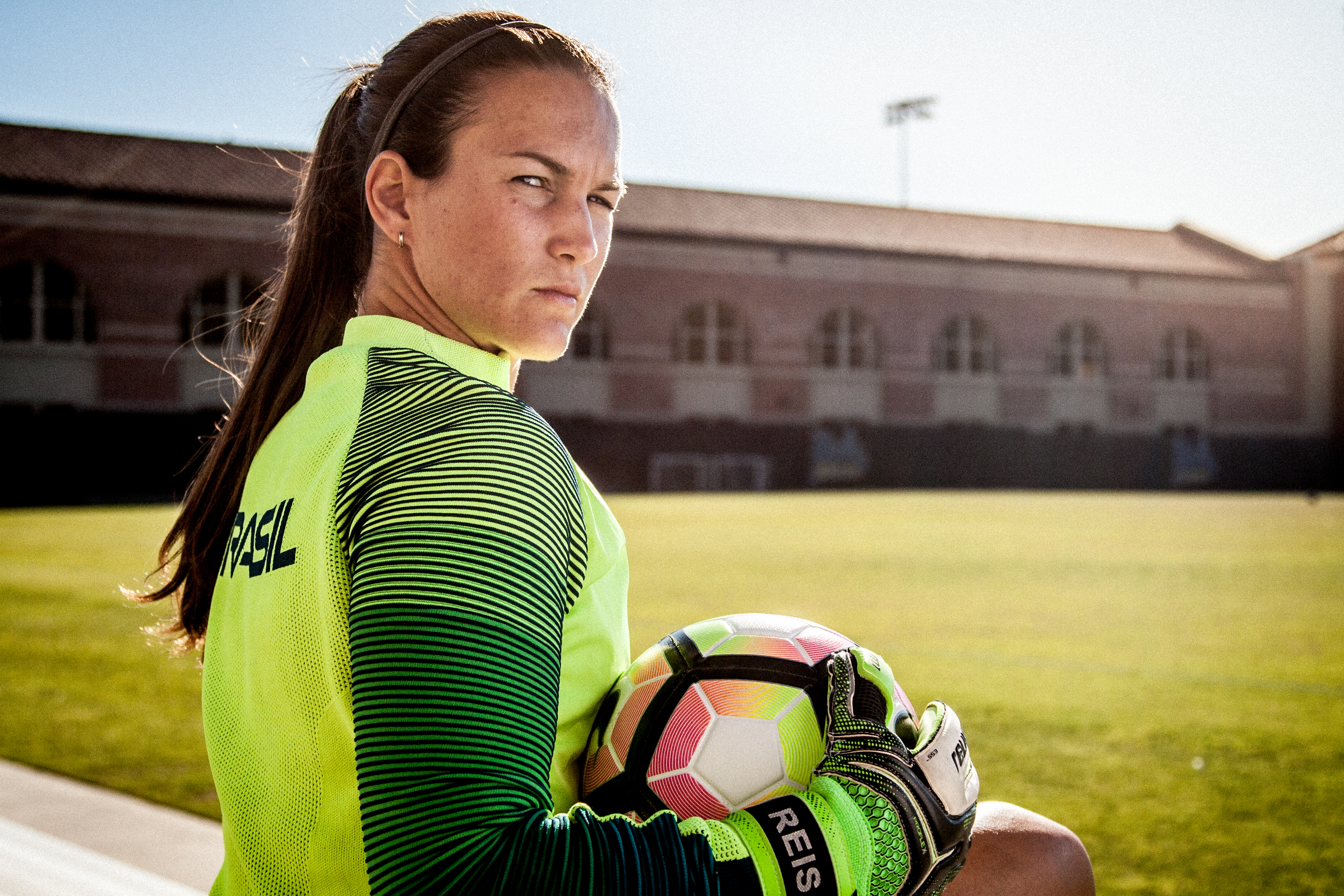
- Aline with Brazil

Personal information
- Full name: Aline Villares Reis
- Date of birth: 15 April 1989 (age 37)
- Place of birth: Aguaí, Brazil
- Height: 1.63 m (5 ft 4 in)
- Position: Goalkeeper

Team information
- Current team: Al-Hilal

Youth career
- 2000–2007: Guarani FC

College career
Years	Team	Apps	(Gls)
2008–2011	UCF Knights	85	(0)

Senior career*
Years	Team	Apps	(Gls)
2012	Seinäjoen Mimmiliiga		
2016	Ferroviária	8	(0)
2016–2017	Santa Clarita Blue Heat		
2017	Győri ETO FC		
2018–2024	Granadilla Tenerife	132	(0)
2024–2025	Al Hilal	17	(0)
2025–2026	Al-Ula	10	(0)
2026–	Al-Hilal	0	(0)

International career
2016–2021	Brazil	15	(0)

Managerial career
- 2013–2016: UCLA Bruins (goalkeepers)
- 2022–2023: Orlando Pride (goalkeepers)
- * Club domestic league appearances and goals

Aline Villares Reis (born 15 April 1989), known as Aline, is a Brazilian professional footballer who plays as a goalkeeper for Saudi Women's Premier League club Al-Hilal. Between 2016 and 2021 she made 15 appearances for the Brazil national team. She is also a former women's football coach who most recently served as the goalkeeping coach for Orlando Pride in the American National Women's Soccer League (NWSL).

== Early life ==
Aline was born in Aguaí, Brazil. She was inspired to play football as a goalkeeper by Cláudio Taffarel after watching the 1994 FIFA World Cup final's penalty shoot-out between Brazil and Italy. At the age of 18, she moved to Orlando, Florida, in the United States to play college soccer.

== College career ==
Aline was a four-year starter for the University of Central Florida Knights women's soccer team from 2007 to 2011, and earned NSCAA All-Central Region and All-Conference-USA honours in all four of her playing seasons. She started all but two matches for the UCF Knights and totalled 2,278 minutes during her college career. After sitting out 2007 with an injury, the NSCAA named her a second-team All-American in her redshirt freshman season of 2008, making her the first UCF Knight to be named an All-American since 1995. She finished her collegiate career ranked second in program history in saves (347), fourth in shutouts (28), and sixth in goals-against average (1.04), and was named UCF's top player in the Conference-USA era.

== Club career ==
Before her collegiate career, Aline played for Guarani FC for over six years.

In 2012, following her collegiate playing career, Aline played professionally in Finland with first-division side Seinäjoen Mimmiliiga. Her visa expired before the end of her only season with the club.

She then worked as the director of soccer operations for her alma mater, UCF, while pursuing a master's degree in sport and exercise science. In late 2013, Aline joined the UCLA Bruins women's soccer coaching staff as a volunteer goalkeeping coach.

In December 2015, she temporarily left UCLA to play for Ferroviária in Brazil. Following the 2016 Summer Olympics, she returned to the United States and UCLA, and also played for Santa Clarita Blue Heat of the pro-am United Women's Soccer league.

In 2017, Aline left UCLA to play in the Hungarian top women's league for ETO FC, but left the club along with the other international players due to not being paid their salaries.

In 2018, Aline signed to play in the Spanish Primera Iberdrola with UDG Tenerife, where she played for four seasons.

Aline announced her retirement from professional football on 30 January 2022, but after her suspension as a coach from the Orlando Pride in 2022, she resumed her playing career and re-signed with Tenerife in January 2023, She started 11 matches and recorded 32 saves and two clean sheets during the remainder of the 2022–23 Liga F season. One of her two shutouts on the season was against Real Madrid, in a 1–0 victory on 18 March 2023 that ended Madrid's 14-match unbeaten streak.

== International career ==
Aline was first called to the Brazil camp in July 2009 during her college career. She attended several training camps and friendly matches with Brazil without making an appearance. In 2016, following her season with Ferroviária, Brazil named Aline to the national team roster and signed her to a residency contract with the Brazil national team (Seleção Permanente) to prepare for the 2016 Summer Olympics in Rio. Brazil named Aline as one of two goalkeepers on the final 18-player Olympic roster and debuted for the national team during the games, playing the full match of a 0–0 draw against South Africa in front of 42,000 people at the Arena da Amazônia.

Brazil also named Aline to the national team squad for the 2018 Copa América, which Brazil won, and for the 2019 FIFA Women's World Cup and as an alternate for the 2020 Summer Olympics.

== Coaching career ==
From 2013 to 2016, Aline spent four seasons as a volunteer goalkeeping coach for the UCLA Bruins women's soccer program under head coach Amanda Cromwell, who had been Aline's coach at UCF. Aline helped develop Katelyn Rowland, who set NCAA career and single-season shutout records during her UCLA career. The Bruins won a national championship and led the nation in goals against average in 2013.

On 31 January 2022, professional club Orlando Pride of the American National Women's Soccer League (NWSL) hired Aline as its goalkeeping coach, reuniting her with Cromwell. On 10 October 2022, following the publication of a joint league and NWSL Players Association investigative report into the 2021 NWSL abuse scandal, the NWSL placed Aline on unpaid administrative leave, and fired Cromwell and Pride assistant coach Sam Greene. The report alleged that Aline had not cooperated with the joint investigation and also pressured players to provide positive feedback to investigators.

Aline was invited to be the pioneering athlete to create her own "masterclass" in Brazil for "Classe das Campeãs", featuring Olympic athletes. In a series of eight episodes, Aline shared experiences as a coach and an athlete, goalkeeping skills, and techniques to develop emotional intelligence and a strong mental game. ESPN Brasil aired the series "Jornada Aline Reis" on 9 March 2022.

== Honors ==
UCF Knights (player)

- Conference-USA regular season: 2007, 2009, 2010

Brazil (player)

- Copa América Femenina: 2018

UCLA Bruins (goalkeeping coach)

- NCAA Division I national championship: 2013
- Pac-12 conference championship: 2013, 2014

Individual

- UCF Athletics Hall of Fame: Inducted 2019
- Premio Marca (top Iberoamerican player in Spain's top division): 2021
