= Sonia Abrão =

Brazilian television presenter (born 1963)

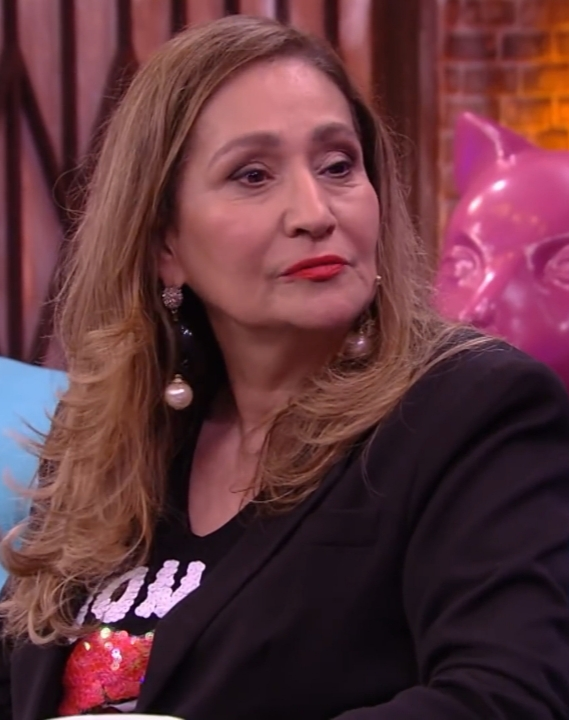
- Abrão in 2018
- Born: Sonia Maria de Souza Abrão; June 20, 1954 (age 72); São Paulo, São Paulo, Brazil
- Education: Cásper Líbero College
- Occupations: Journalist, television presenter, writer
- Years active: 1991–present
- Spouse: Jorge Damião (m. 1988; div. 2015)
- Children: 1

Sonia Maria de Souza Abrão (born June 20, 1954) is a Brazilian journalist, television presenter and writer. She has worked for newspapers, magazines and TV networks such as SBT, RecordTV and RedeTV!.

Abrão has hosted various shows throughout her career, including Falando Francamente (2002–2004), Sonia e Você (2004–2006) and A Tarde É Sua, which has been on air since 2006. In addition to her television work, she has published cookbooks, self-help books and a biography.

== Biography ==
Abrão was born in São Paulo on June 20, 1954, and graduated in journalism at the Faculdade Cásper Líbero. Throughout her career she has worked for newspapers and magazines such as Notícias Populares, Contigo!, Amiga and Diário de S. Paulo. In 1991 she debuted as a journalist for SBT's Aqui Agora, retaining her position until 1997, when she was invited to join Domingo Legal as a reporter. In 2002 she was given her first solo variety show, Falando Francamente, which ended its run in 2004 after she joined RecordTV. There she hosted Sonia e Você until 2006, when a series of divergences prompted her departure. Shortly after she was invited by RedeTV! to host A Tarde É Sua, which continues to be broadcast to the present day.

Besides her career in television, Abrão has also published the cookbooks/memoirs Santas Receitas (2007) and Doces Lembranças (2013), the latter alongside her sister Margareth Abrão; the self-help books Abaixo a Mulher-Capacho! (2009) and Homens que Somem (2012); and As Pedras do Meu Caminho (2015), a biography of Polegar frontman Rafael Ilha.

=== Controversy ===
On October 15, 2008, Brazilian girl Eloá Cristina Pimentel (age 15) was kidnapped and held hostage by her ex-boyfriend Lindemberg Alves in her own apartment. The kidnapping ultimately resulted in the death of Pimentel. During the ongoing hostage situation, Abrão interviewed Alves and Pimentel live by telephone on her RedeTV! show A Tarde É Sua, interfering with the hostage negotiations.

Abrão's show, which had a daily average of 2 points on IBOPE, peaked at 5 points during the interview. According to sociologist and journalist Laurindo Leal Filho, who presented the program Ver TV on TV Câmara about ethics on television, the interference of a broadcaster in a case like this, besides being dangerous, is unconstitutional. The Federal Public Prosecutor's Office (MP) decided to file a public civil action against the presenter for airing the interview. The MP stated that the interviews interfered with ongoing police activity and put the lives of the teenager and those involved in the operation at risk, and asked for a compensation of 1.5 million reais for collective moral damage.

In response to the criticism, Abrão stated she "would do it all over again".

=== Personal life ===
A devout Catholic Christian, Abrão was married to entrepreneur Jorge Damião for 17 years (from 1988 to 2015), with whom she had a son; Later in life she would reveal that, before getting pregnant by Jorge Fernando, she suffered a miscarriage. In 2017 she embraced veganism.

She was a cousin of late Charlie Brown Jr. frontman Alexandre Magno Abrão, better known as Chorão.
