= Dominó =

Brazilian boy band

- Origin: São Paulo, Brazil
- Genres: Latin pop; teen pop
- Years active: 1984–2009
- Label: Promoart

Dominó was a Brazilian boy band created by television presenter Gugu Liberato. They were most popular in the 1980s and late 1990s. The band sold about 6 million copies in Brazil in the 1980s. The original lineup was Afonso Nigro, Nill, Marcos Quintela and Marcelo Rodrigues. The band's biggest hits were "Ela Não Gosta de Mim," "Companheiro", "'P. da Vida", "Manequim" and "Com Todos Menos Comigo."

Between 1992 and 1995, the actor and television presenter Rodrigo Faro was part of the group. With the lineup of Rodrigo Phavanello, Rodriguinho, Cristiano Garcia and Eber Albêncio, the band achieved national fame in 1997 with the song "Baila, Baila Comigo", which became a great commercial success and sold over three million copies in Brazil.

== History ==
=== Beginnings (1984) ===
Designed along the lines of Puerto Rican boy band Menudo (band), Dominó appeared in 1984 with the hit "Companheiro". When Menudo broke out in Brazil, Augusto Liberato, through his Promoart agency, decided to form a nationalized version of the group. For the formation of the group, several boys aged between 14 and 15 years underwent auditions for which they had to learn to sing and dance. The selected boys were Affonso Celso Lucatelli Nigro (Afonso Nigro), Lenilson dos Santos (Nill), Marcos Roberto Quintela (Marcos) and Marcelo Henrique Rodrigues (Marcelo). In 1984, the group released a CBS Compact Disc with two covers of songs by the Mexican group Timbiriche, "Ela Não Gosta de Mim" and "Companheiro". The latter was their first song to break out on the radio, complemented by a video clip released on Globo's program Fantástico.

=== International success and "dominómania" (1985-1988) ===
In 1985, when Dominó was already popular, the group released their first LP on CBS which included, in addition to "Companheiro" and "Ela Não Gosta de Mim", the single "Ainda Sou Você" from that album. Moreover, it had the special participation of the Turma do Balão Mágico group on the tracks "Chega Mais Um Pouco" and "Fim de Semana". In 1986, in addition to being a constant presence on TV shows, especially the TVS, Dominó gained a special station at a resort. In the same year, Dominó released a record in Spanish and broke into the Latin market. This LP had a remake of "Lindo Balão Azul" by Guilherme Arantes. The second album was followed by the hits "Guerreiros", "Mariá", "Amor e Música" and "Jura de Amor".

In 1987, Dominó had already spent three years on the road and was a success with the public and critics. The third LP was the culmination of "dominómania" plaguing the country. This album featured hits like " 'P. da Vida," which sold well at its launch, followed by "Manequim" and "Medusa". That same year, they participated in the film Os Fantasmas Trapalhões along with entrepreneur Gugu Liberato. In 1988, the "Black Album", as it is known, showed the group maturing and brought more reflective character songs. This LP brought the hits "Com Todos Menos Comigo," "Bruta Ansiedade" and "As Palavras", with the special participation of Angélica, who at the time was presenter of Clube da Criança and Milk Shake programs in Rede Manchete. That same year the quartet also participated in two films: Os Heróis Trapalhões - Uma Aventura na Selva and Os Trapalhões na Terra dos Monstros, where they sing the "Paradise" song. They sold about 6 million copies throughout Brazil.

=== Nill's exit, the appearance of the thumb and new lineups (1989–1995) ===
In 1989, Nill left the group and started a solo career. The farewell was on the Viva a Noite program on 19 October 1989. Promoart preferred to follow the group's career with only three members and released their fifth LP in 1990. It was accompanied by the bands "Maria", "Felicidade Já" and "Leilão". After the departure of Nill, the group lost much of its popularity and its media presence.

This was also due to the formation of the Polegar group, a youth band also released by Promoart Shows. Unlike Dominó, Polegar did not use choreographies but musical instruments, and stood out for being the first youth band launched at a national level, formed by Alan Frank, Alex Gill, Rafael Ilha and Ricardo Costa.

The Dominó group also released another self-titled album in 1992, but no longer had its main member and vocalist Afonso Nigro, who left the group a few months before the LP was recorded. Promoart and Sony Music, which had bought CBS Records, chose to reactivate the quartet, choosing two new members: a boy named Italo Coutinho and the host of the children's program ZYB Bom of the Rede Bandeirantes, Rodrigo Faro. The single "Sem Compromisso" was the only success of the album, which was sung by Marcelo Rodrigues and had the special participation of his girlfriend at the time, the host of the SBT, Mara Maravilha. Their next song was "Ó Que Eu Te Ponho," a song that was well-publicized on TV and had early success.

In 1993, Marcos Quintela left the group and was replaced by Fabio. In this same year, Marcelo Rodrigues announced he was leaving the group on the Sabadão program, in which he recalled the old hit "Manequim". Valmir was introduced in his place. The lineup became: Rodrigo Faro, Italo Coutinho, Fabio and Valmir.

In 1995, the group launched the provocative album that came with the single "Oh Carol," a version of Neil Sedaka song.

=== Without Promoart, forgetfulness and return (1997–2006) ===
Soon after 1992, the group was forgotten, but in 1997, the group reappeared and returned successfully with the song "Baila, Baila Comigo". This lineup consisted of Rodrigo Phavanello, Eber Albêncio, Rodriguinho and Cristiano Garcia. The album Comvido! sold 290,000 copies in France, and the group performed in countries such as Turkey, Tunisia and Lebanon. In 1999, this lineup also recorded an album called "Give me love" and a clip of the music Diz Que Sim in Jordan.

In 2001, with the departure of Rodrigo Phavanello, Klaus Hee joined the group and they recorded the album "La bomba". The eponymous single "La Bomba" was the lead track, recorded in Spanish and covered in Portuguese.

After a few years, the group returned in 2003 independent of Promoart. The lineup consisted of Maike Eversong, Ricky Fell, Diego Pompeu, and Leandro Lemos. Then Maike Eversong exited (in 2002) and two members entered. One was Julio Street (official cover of Backstreet Boys), who was known from 1999 to 2002 for playing shows throughout Brazil and opening for the Backstreet Boys, doing shows on TV, and who is now a photographer. The other was a former model and actor Arthur Cezar, who currently is producing his first solo CD career with music copyright, in addition to directing the company Boulevard Productions, producer of musical shows and blockbusters of Musical de São Paulo. The group appeared a few times on television programs, such as the Domingo Legal, SBT, in July 2003, Superpop and Bom Dia Mulher programs of the RedeTV!. The songs were composed by the members and the singles were "Coração Parou" and "Baby", but the success did not last long. This lineup was considered by the producer as the last official formation of the Dominó Group.

=== BMD and more lineup changes (2008–2009) ===
In 2008, former members Arthur Cezar, Leandro Lemos, and Alexandre Albertoni and new member Isaac decided to form a new group called DMO. The group disbanded soon after. Earlier in 2007, Alexandre Albertoni posed for the G Magazine.

In February 2008, there was an audition to choose the new members in Rio de Janeiro and Rafael Pires, Vinicius, Thalis and Jojo were chosen to integrate the new lineup. They shared an apartment in Barra da Tijuca and recorded an album that would have four new songs and eight remakes of the first lineup's songs. But this formation was considered a testing phase by the producers and did not last. In March, the singer Rafael Pires suffered a lightning-kidnapping and was later released.

According to the newspaper O Globo, the group would, until April 2008, perform on the Domingo Legal (SBT) program with Afonso Nigro and Rodriguinho, but there was no more group news.

In late 2008, they launched the new lineup at the ExpoBauru-SP agricultural inaugural party, for an audience of more than 60 thousand people. The group, launched by the SBT TV network, was composed of João Paulo Damazio, Leandro Naiss, Rachid Camargo and Thiago Ruffineli. The group disbanded in 2009.

=== Media ===
- On 22 August 2009, Dominó was remembered in the "Lata Velha" of the Rede Globo's program Caldeirão do Huck and featured Afonso Nigro and actress and model Luciana Vendramini, who participated in the 1987 music video "Manequim".
- On 22 May 2010, Rede Record's program O Melhor do Brasil was aired, with Rodrigo Faro doing an imitation of Dominó. The songs "Manequim", "Companheiro" and "" P.da Vida" were remembered.
- On May 31, 2010, former members Nill and Marcelo appeared in Programa do Gugu on Rede Record along with two former members of Polegar, Alex Gill and Alan Frank, and two former members of the Boomerang group.
- Nill, former member and lawyer, gospel singer and pastor was interviewed by TV Fame RedeTV!. The interview was broadcast on 12 June 2010.
- On February 18, 2012, Rodrigo Faro had a stake in Legendary program with Marcos Mion, which mimicked the Dominó group and danced the song "Manequim" while Faro sung.
- In the film Odeio o Dia dos Namorados, a poster of the first album can be seen in the room of the protagonist Deborah (Heloisa Périssé).
- In 2014, Rede Record premiered the Domingokê framework in their programs of Rodrigo Faro, O Melhor do Brasil and A Hora do Faro. The band of the table is led by Afonso Nigro.
- In 2015, on the Domingo Show program of Record Television Network, presenter Geraldo Luis made a tribute to Rodrigo Faro, taking the stage of the program four different seasons of members of the Dominó Group, highlighting Rodrigo Faro and Rodrigo Phavanello.

== Former members ==
=== Original lineup ===
- Afonso Nigro (1984-1991)
- Nill (Lenilson dos Santos) (1984-1989)
- Marcos Quintela (1984-1993)
- Marcelo Rodrigues (1984-1993)

=== Others ===
- Rodrigo Faro (1992-1995)
- Italian Coutinho (1992-1995)
- Fabio (1993-1995)
- Ricardo (1995)
- Valmir (1995)
- Rodrigo Phavanello (1995-2001)
- Eber Rodrigues Albêncio (1995-2001)
- Cristiano Momense Garcia (1996-2001)
- Rodrigo Lázaro de Paula (Rodriguinho) (1997-2001)
- Klaus Hee (2001-2003)
- Maike Eversong (2001-2003)
- Ricky Fell (2003-2008)
- Pompey Diego (2003-2008)
- Arthur Cezar (2003 - 2008)
- Julio Street (2003 - 2008)
- Leandro Lemos (2003-2008)
- Alexandre Albertoni (2008)
- Isaac (2008)
- Rafael Pires (2008)
- Vinicius (2008)
- Thalis (2008)
- Jojo (2008)
- John Paul Damazio (2008-2009)
- Leandro Naiss (2008-2009)
- Rachid Camargo (2008-2009)
- Thiago Ruffineli (2008-2009)

== Discography ==
=== Studio albums ===
- Dominó (1985)
- Dominó (1986)
- Dominó (1987)
- Dominó (1988)
- Dominó (1990)
- Dominó (1992)
- Provocante (1995)
- Ritmos Latinos (1996)
- Comvido! (1997)
- Give Me Love (1999)
- Dominó (2001)
- Vem Ver (2003)

=== Collections ===
- Hits (1988)
- 20 SuperSucessos (1997)
- Brilhantes (1999)

=== Singles ===
- "Ela Não Gosta de Mim"
- "Companheiro"(também lado b de "Ela Não Gosta de Mim")
- "Ainda Sou Você"
- "A Moto" (também lado b de "Companheiro")
- "Vem Pra Mim"
- "Ei! Garota"
- "Guerreiros"
- "Mariá"
- "Jura de Amor"
- "Amor e Música"
- "Nada Que Eu Quero Mais"
- "Dançando Com Ela"
- "P. da Vida"
- "Manequim"
- "Medusa"
- "Tudo a Ver Com o Teu Olhar"
- "Linha e Carretel"
- "Com Todos Menos Comigo"
- "As Palavras" (com Angélica)
- "Dono de Mim"
- "Nada Pra Mim"
- "Bruta Ansiedade"
- "Maria"
- "Felicidade Já"
- "Leilão"
- "O Que Eu Te Ponho"
- "Sem Compromisso" (com Mara Maravilha)
- "Bum Bum"
- "Vem Provar"
- "Oh! Carol"
- "Põe, Põe"
- "Baila, Baila Comigo"
- "Estoy Queriendo Contigo"
- "Diz Que Sim"
- "La Bomba"
- "Não Diga Não"
- "Coração Parou"
- "Baby"

=== Other Songs ===
- "Chega Mais Um Pouco" (with the Turma do Balão Mágico)
- "Fim de Semana" (with the Turma do Balão Mágico)
- "Lindo Balón Azul" (released only in Spain and Venezuela)

== Filmography ==
=== Vídeo Clips ===
- Companheiro (1985)
- Ela Não Gosta de Mim (1985)
- Nem Romeu, Nem Julieta (1985)
- Ei, Garota (1985)
- Ainda Sou Você (1985)
- Jura de Amor (1986)
- Guerreiros (1986)
- Manequim (1987)
- "P" da Vida (1987)
- Com Todos Menos Comigo (1988)
- Maria (1990)
- O Que Eu Te Ponho (1992)
- Vem Provar (1993)
- Baila, Baila Comigo (1997)
- Estoy Queriendo Contigo (1997)
- Diz Que Sim (1999)

== Shows and movies ==
Year	Title	Role	Note
1984	Balão Mágico (TV program)	Dominó (Afonso, Nill, Marcelo and Marcos)	Special participation
1987	Os Fantasmas Trapalhões (film)	Dominó (Afonso, Nill, Marcelo and Marcos)	Adjuncts
1988	Os Heróis Trapalhões - Uma Aventura na Selva (film)	Dominó (Afonso, Nill, Marcelo and Marcos)	Adjuncts
1988	O Casamento dos Trapalhões (film)	Dominó (Afonso, Nill, Marcelo and Marcos)	Adjuncts
1989	Os Trapalhões na Terra dos Monstros (film)	Dominó (Afonso, Nill, Marcelo and Marcos)	Special participation
