= The Voice Kids (Brazilian TV series) season 3 =

The Voice Kids
- Season 3
- Hosted by: André Marques
- Judges: Carlinhos Brown; Claudia Leitte; Simone & Simaria
- Winner: Eduarda Brasil

Release
- Original network: Rede Globo
- Original release: January 7 – April 8, 2018

Season chronology
- Next → Season 4

The third season of The Voice Kids, premiered on Rede Globo on January 7, 2018 in the 2:00 / 1:00 p.m. (BRST / AMT) daytime slot.

== Teams ==
Key

- Winner
- Runner-up
- Eliminated in the Live shows
- Eliminated in the Battle rounds

Coaches	Top 72 artists					
Carlinhos Brown						
Carlinhos Brown	Mariah Yohana	Talita Cipriano	Ranna Andrade	Maiara Morena	Daniel Arthur	Felipe Machado
Carlinhos Brown	Giovanna Alvarenga	Maria Clara & Mariana	Alane Freitas	Ana Vitória	Arthur Rodrigues	Claudia Zanetti
Carlinhos Brown	Gio Ventura	Giovanna Khair	Guilherme Porto	Isadora Emer	Larissa & Isabela	Matheus Loubet
Carlinhos Brown	Nicolas Silva	Poliana Guaratuba	Sabrina Santos	Sofia Cordeiro	Valentina Roman	Vivian Passos
Simone & Simaria						
Simone & Simaria	Eduarda Brasil	Livia Bernarde	Luis Henrique Schultz	Augusto Michel	Felipe Gaspar	Gustavo Dezani
Simone & Simaria	Jennifer Campos	Luan Gabriel	Alerrandro Costa	Ana Julia	Arthur Secco	Eduarda Back
Simone & Simaria	Guga Lima	Jhony Wlad	João Manoel	Kayro Oliveira	Lorena Fiori	Lorenzo Fortes
Simone & Simaria	Lúcia Muniz	Matheus Laurindo	Nati Limma	Rayane Lima	Victor Hugo Dias	Victória Andrade
Claudia Leitte						
Claudia Leitte	Neto Junqueira	Fabiana Moneró	Pedro Sousa	Fernanda Ouro	Amanda Carregaro	Rebeca Marques
Claudia Leitte	Victor Hugo	Yasmin Giacomini	Bia Rosa	Dudu Marodin	Gabriel Ciríaco	Guilherme Martinez
Claudia Leitte	Izabela Góis	João Guilherme	Julia Costa	Kaique Bueno	Letícia Alves	Ludmila Bruck
Claudia Leitte	Luma Sobral	Marcos Prata	Mariana Ribeiro	Mel Chaves	Morgana	Nicolle Castro

== Blind auditions ==
Key

✔	Coach pressed "I WANT YOU" button
	Artist defaulted to a coach's team
	Artist picked a coach's team
	Artist eliminated with no coach pressing their "I WANT YOU" button

=== Episode 1 (Jan. 7) ===
Order	Artist	Age	Hometown	Song	Coach's and contestant's choices		
Order	Artist	Age	Hometown	Song	Brown	Simone & Simaria	Claudia
1	Guilherme Martinez	11	Caraguatatuba	"Music and Me"	✔	✔	✔
2	Alerrandro Costa	11	São Luís	"É o Amor"	✔	✔	—
3	Ana Vitória	12	Rio das Ostras	"Casinha Branca"	✔	—	—
4	Bia Rosa	9	Rio de Janeiro	"Sereia"	✔	✔	✔
5	Lúcia Muniz	14	Montes Claros	"Moving On"	—	✔	✔
6	Augusto Michel	12	Tangará da Serra	"Estrada da Vida"	✔	✔	✔
7	Pedro Sousa	13	Belém	"Oh Happy Day"	✔	✔	✔
8	Allyne Conrado	14	Teresina	"Esse Tal de Roque Enrow"	—	—	—
9	Alane Freitas	10	Natal	"Água de Beber"	✔	—	—
10	Rayane Lima	15	Brasília	"Meu Violão e o Nosso Cachorro"	✔	✔	✔
11	Fabiana Moneró	12	Rio de Janeiro	"Will I See You"	—	—	✔
12	Giovanna Khair	15	Rio de Janeiro	"Bohemian Rhapsody"	✔	✔	✔
13	João Henrique	13	Goiânia	"Que Sorte a Nossa"	—	—	—
14	Maria Clara & Mariana	13–10	Belo Horizonte	"Trevo (Tu)"	✔	—	—

=== Episode 2 (Jan. 14) ===
Order	Artist	Age	Hometown	Song	Coach's and contestant's choices		
Order	Artist	Age	Hometown	Song	Brown	Simone & Simaria	Claudia
1	Sofia Cordeiro	10	Porto Alegre	"My Heart Will Go On"	✔	✔	✔
2	Kaique Bueno	12	Indiavaí	"Pra Sempre Vou Te Amar"	✔	✔	✔
3	Maria Clara Rosis	11	São Paulo	"Break Free"	—	—	—
4	Luis Henrique Schultz	15	Piratuba	"Vida Vazia"	—	✔	—
5	Isadora Emer	12	Rio de Janeiro	"Mal de Mim"	✔	✔	✔
6	Gabriel Ciríaco	13	Parnamirim	"O Tempo não Pára"	✔	✔	✔
7	Matheus Tavares	10	Maringá	"Ainda Ontem Chorei de Saudade"	—	—	—
8	Mel Chaves	12	Belém	"Estúpido Cupido"	—	—	✔
9	Kayro Oliveira	10	Caucaia	"Eu Só Quero Um Xodó"	✔	✔	—
10	Matheus Loubet	11	Campo Grande	"Bem Que Se Quis"	✔	—	—
11	Fernanda Ouro	15	São Paulo	"Mercedes Benz"	✔	✔	✔
12	Luan Gabriel	11	Peruíbe	"Alô Porteiro"	✔	✔	—
13	Vivian Passos	12	São João del Rei	"Onde Anda Você"	✔	—	✔
14	Yasmim Giacomini	10	Taubaté	"Fico Assim Sem Você"	✔	✔	✔

=== Episode 3 (Jan. 21) ===
Order	Artist	Age	Hometown	Song	Coach's and contestant's choices		
Order	Artist	Age	Hometown	Song	Brown	Simone & Simaria	Claudia
1	Neto Junqueira	14	Catanduva	"Use Somebody"	✔	✔	✔
2	Mariah Yohana	9	João Pessoa	"É de Chocolate"	✔	✔	✔
3	Nati Limma	14	Rio de Janeiro	"Lilás"	—	✔	—
4	Tuca Almeida	12	Campo Grande	"Price Tag"	—	—	—
5	Guilherme Porto	15	Alegrete	"Romântico Anônimo"	✔	—	—
6	Jennifer Campos	13	Praia Grande	"Conquistando o Impossível"	✔	✔	✔
7	Marcos Prata	14	Estância	"Não Aprendi a Dizer Adeus"	—	—	✔
8	Nandinha Francine	12	Nova Iguaçu	"Cheguei"	—	—	—
9	Gustavo Dezani	12	Iacri	"É Com Ela Que Eu Estou"	—	✔	—
10	Ranna Andrade	12	Guarabira	"Porto Solidão"	✔	—	—
11	Ana Julia	12	Curitiba	"Era Uma Vez"	—	✔	—
12	Eduarda Brasil	15	São José de Piranhas	"Forró do Xenhenhem"	✔	✔	✔
13	Clara Alves	14	Marmelópolis	"Não Precisa"	—	—	—
14	Felipe Machado	15	São Paulo	"Sapato Velho"	✔	—	—
15	Morgana	15	Japaratuba	"Hey Jude"	✔	✔	✔

=== Episode 4 (Jan. 28) ===
Order	Artist	Age	Hometown	Song	Coach's and contestant's choices		
Order	Artist	Age	Hometown	Song	Brown	Simone & Simaria	Claudia
1	Letícia Alves	11	Águas Claras	"I Want You Back"	✔	✔	✔
2	Matheus Laurindo	13	São Paulo	"Evidências"	—	✔	—
3	Larissa & Isabela	9–11	Curitiba	"Ursinho Pimpão"	✔	✔	✔
4	Guyllerson Dias	12	Campo Grande	"Mercedita"	—	—	—
5	Amanda Carregaro	15	Angélica	"Muito Pouco"	—	—	✔
6	Arthur Rodrigues	15	Governador Valadares	"Mais Uma de Amor"	✔	—	—
7	Talita Cipriano	14	São Paulo	"Fim de Tarde"	✔	✔	✔
8	Yohanna Vale	14	Manaus	"Trem Bala"	—	—	—
9	João Guilherme	10	Santo Antônio do Sudoeste	"See You Again"	✔	—	✔
10	Valentina Roman	12	Arvorezinha	"Vilarejo"	✔	—	—
11	Arthur Secco	10	Capinzal	"Será Que Foi Saudade?"	✔	✔	✔
12	Maria Klink	13	Santo André	"When We Were Young"	—	—	—
13	Nicolas Silva	15	Pedrão	"As Rosas Não Falam"	✔	—	—
14	Lorenzo Fortes	13	Manaus	"Fantasma"	—	✔	—
15	Ludmilla Bruck	12	Itambacuri	"A Lenda"	—	—	✔

=== Episode 5 (Feb. 4) ===
Order	Artist	Age	Hometown	Song	Coach's and contestant's choices		
Order	Artist	Age	Hometown	Song	Brown	Simone & Simaria	Claudia
1	Victor Hugo	12	Rio de Janeiro	"I Have Nothing"	✔	✔	✔
2	Giovanna Alvarenga	10	Campo Belo	"Flor do Reggae"	✔	—	—
3	Jhony Wlad	14	Belém	"Vidinha de Balada"	✔	✔	—
4	Maria Clara	9	Boa Esperança	"Era Uma Vez"	—	—	—
5	Victória Andrade	15	Ladário	"Someone like You"	—	✔	—
6	Claudia Zanetti	15	Vila Velha	"Girl on Fire"	✔	✔	✔
7	Dudu Marodin	12	Ibaiti	"Memórias"	—	—	✔
8	Eduarda Back	14	Marechal Cândido Rondon	"Se o Amor Tiver Lugar"	—	✔	—
9	Luma Sobral	12	Salvador	"I Dreamed a Dream"	—	—	✔
10	Gabriela Girio	15	Ribeirão Preto	"Tempos Modernos"	—	—	—
11	Lorena Fiori	10	Rio de Janeiro	"Flashlight"	—	✔	✔
12	Daniel Arthur	10	Marília	"Flores"	✔	—	—
13	Nicolle Castro	13	Rio de Janeiro	"Tudo pode Mudar"	✔	—	✔
14	Guga Lima	13	Belém	"Amanheceu"	✔	✔	✔

=== Episode 6 (Feb. 11) ===
Order	Artist	Age	Hometown	Song	Coach's and contestant's choices		
Order	Artist	Age	Hometown	Song	Brown	Simone & Simaria	Claudia
1	Izabela Góis	11	Funilândia	"As Quatro Estações"	—	—	✔
2	Victor Hugo Dias	14	Limeira	"Madrid"	✔	✔	—
3	Felipe Gaspar	12	São Paulo	"A Flor e o Beija-Flor"	—	✔	—
4	Isadora Gomes	14	Rio de Janeiro	"Espelhos D'Agua"	—	—	—
5	Sabrina Santos	13	Barra do Mendes	"Nada Mais"	✔	—	—
6	Maiara Morena	14	Rio de Janeiro	"Não Deixe O Samba Morrer"	✔	✔	✔
7	Pedro Borges	13	Sorriso	"Se Deus Me Ouvisse"	—	—	—
8	Gio Ventura	13	São Paulo	"Feeling Good"	✔	—	✔
9	João Manoel	13	Pitangueiras	"Te Assumi pro Brasil"	—	✔	—
10	Mariana Ribeiro	14	Montes Claros	"Maria Maria"	✔	—	✔
11	Rebeca Marques	11	Turvelândia	"Romaria"	—	—	✔
12	Livia Bernarde	13	Campinas	"Além do Arco Iris"	✔	✔	✔
13	Julia Costa	11	Santa Cruz do Capibaribe	"Retrato da Vida"	✔	Team full	✔
14	Arthur Staphanato	14	Cachoeiro do Itapemirim	"Se Você Pensa"	—	Team full	Team full
15	Poliana Guaratuba	12	Guaratuba	"Eu Sei de Cor"	✔	Team full	Team full

== The Battles ==
Key

Artist won the Battle and advanced to the Live shows
Artist lost the Battle and was eliminated

Episode	Coach	Order	Winner	Song	Losers	
Episode 7 (February 18)	Claudia Leitte	1	Pedro Sousa	"Photograph"	João Guilherme	Kaique Bueno
Episode 7 (February 18)	Simone & Simaria	2	Eduarda Brasil	"126 Cabides"	Rayane Lima	Victória Andrade
Episode 7 (February 18)	Carlinhos Brown	3	Daniel Arthur	"Marvin Gaye"	Matheus Loubet	Valentina Roman
Episode 7 (February 18)	Claudia Leitte	4	Yasmim Giacomini	"Pra Ver Se Cola"	Bia Rosa	Julia Costa
Episode 7 (February 18)	Carlinhos Brown	5	Ranna Andrade	"Deixo"	Poliana Guaratuba	Sabrina Santos
Episode 7 (February 18)	Simone & Simaria	6	Luis Henrique Schultz	"Louca de Saudade"	Lorenzo Fortes	Victor Hugo Dias
Episode 7 (February 18)	Carlinhos Brown	7	Maria Clara & Mariana	"A Fórmula do Amor"	Ana Vitória	Vivian Passos
Episode 7 (February 18)	Simone & Simaria	8	Augusto Michel	"Fogão de Lenha"	Jhony Wlad	Matheus Laurindo
Episode 8 (February 25)	Carlinhos Brown	1	Maiara Morena	"Joga Fora"	Claudia Zanetti	Nicolas Silva
Episode 8 (February 25)	Simone & Simaria	2	Luan Gabriel	"Todo Azul do Mar"	Guga Lima	Nati Limma
Episode 8 (February 25)	Claudia Leitte	3	Fabiana Moneró	"Tudo Diferente"	Luma Sobral	Mel Chaves
Episode 8 (February 25)	Simone & Simaria	4	Gustavo Dezani	"Tristeza do Jeca"	Arthur Secco	Kayro Oliveira
Episode 8 (February 25)	Claudia Leitte	5	Fernanda Ouro	"Dangerous Woman"	Morgana	Nicolle Castro
Episode 8 (February 25)	Carlinhos Brown	6	Felipe Machado	"Pro Dia Nascer Feliz"	Arthur Rodrigues	Guilherme Porto
Episode 8 (February 25)	Simone & Simaria	7	Jennifer Campos	"Fica"	Ana Julia	Lorena Fiori
Episode 8 (February 25)	Claudia Leitte	8	Neto Junqueira	"Rude"	Dudu Marodin	Gabriel Ciríaco
Episode 9 (March 4)	Carlinhos Brown	1	Talita Cipriano	"Signed, Sealed, Delivered I'm Yours"	Gio Ventura	Giovanna Khair
Episode 9 (March 4)	Claudia Leitte	2	Victor Hugo	"Meu Mundo e Nada Mais"	Guilherme Martinez	Marcos Prata
Episode 9 (March 4)	Simone & Simaria	3	Livia Bernarde	"Sorry Not Sorry"	Eduarda Back	Lúcia Muniz
Episode 9 (March 4)	Carlinhos Brown	4	Mariah Yohana	"Narizinho"	Alane Freitas	Larissa & Isabela
Episode 9 (March 4)	Claudia Leitte	5	Rebeca Marques	"Amei Te Ver"	Izabela Góis	Letícia Alves
Episode 9 (March 4)	Simone & Simaria	6	Felipe Gaspar	"Cê Que Sabe"	Alerrandro Costa	João Manoel
Episode 9 (March 4)	Claudia Leitte	7	Amanda Carregaro	"Mais Uma Vez"	Ludmila Bruck	Mariana Ribeiro
Episode 9 (March 4)	Carlinhos Brown	8	Giovanna Alvarenga	"Holiday"	Isadora Emer	Sofia Cordeiro

== Live shows ==
=== Elimination chart ===
Artist's info

- Artist from Team Brown
- Artist from Team Simone & Simaria
- Artist from Team Claudia

Result details

- Artist was the winner
- Artist was runner-up
- Artist advanced on public's votes
- Artist was saved by coach
- Artist advanced to the final
- Artist was eliminated
- Artist was eliminated but returned to competition

Live show results per week
Artist	Week 1	Week 2	Week 3	Week 4	Week 5
Eduarda Brasil	Safe		Safe	Advanced	Winner
Mariah Yohana	Safe		Safe	Advanced	Runner-up
Neto Junqueira		Safe	Safe	Advanced	Runner-up
Talita Cipriano	Safe		Safe	Advanced	Runner-up
Fabiana Moneró	Safe		Safe	Eliminated	Eliminated (week 4)
Livia Bernade		Safe	Safe	Eliminated	Eliminated (week 4)
Luis Henrique Schultz		Safe	Safe	Eliminated	Eliminated (week 4)
Pedro Sousa		Safe	Safe	Eliminated	Eliminated (week 4)
Ranna Andrade		Safe	Safe	Eliminated	Eliminated (week 4)
Augusto Michel	Safe		Eliminated	Eliminated (week 3)	
Fernanda Ouro	Safe		Eliminated	Eliminated (week 3)	
Maiara Morena		Safe	Eliminated	Eliminated (week 3)	
Amanda Carregaro		Eliminated	Eliminated (week 2)		
Giovanna Alvarenga		Eliminated	Eliminated (week 2)		
Gustavo Dezani		Eliminated	Eliminated (week 2)		
Luan Gabriel		Eliminated	Eliminated (week 2)		
Maria Clara & Mariana		Eliminated	Eliminated (week 2)		
Yasmim Giacomini		Eliminated	Eliminated (week 2)		
Daniel Arthur	Eliminated	Eliminated (week 1)			
Felipe Gaspar	Eliminated	Eliminated (week 1)			
Felipe Machado	Eliminated	Eliminated (week 1)			
Jennifer Campos	Eliminated	Eliminated (week 1)			
Rebeca Marques	Eliminated	Eliminated (week 1)			
Victor Hugo	Eliminated	Eliminated (week 1)			

=== Week 1 ===
==== Showdown 1 ====
Episode	Coach	Order	Artist	Song	Result
Episode 10 (March 11)
Episode 10 (March 11)	Simone & Simaria	1	Augusto Michel	"Fui Fiel"	Coach's choice
Episode 10 (March 11)	Simone & Simaria	2	Eduarda Brasil	"Baião"	Public's vote (50%)
Episode 10 (March 11)	Simone & Simaria	3	Felipe Gaspar	"Ta Vendo Aquela Lua"	Eliminated
Episode 10 (March 11)	Simone & Simaria	4	Jennifer Campos	"Saber Quem Sou"	Eliminated
Episode 10 (March 11)	Claudia Leitte	5	Fabiana Moneró	"How Can I Go On"	Public's vote (38%)
Episode 10 (March 11)	Claudia Leitte	6	Fernanda Ouro	"I Say a Little Prayer"	Coach's choice
Episode 10 (March 11)	Claudia Leitte	7	Rebeca Marques	"Majestade, o Sabiá"	Eliminated
Episode 10 (March 11)	Claudia Leitte	8	Victor Hugo	"Não Quero Mais"	Eliminated
Episode 10 (March 11)	Carlinhos Brown	9	Daniel Arthur	"This Love"	Eliminated
Episode 10 (March 11)	Carlinhos Brown	10	Felipe Machado	"Como Uma Onda"	Eliminated
Episode 10 (March 11)	Carlinhos Brown	11	Mariah Yohana	"Uni Duni Tê"	Public's vote (52%)
Episode 10 (March 11)	Carlinhos Brown	12	Talita Cipriano	"Esse Brilho é Meu"	Coach's choice

=== Week 2 ===
==== Showdown 2 ====
Episode	Coach	Order	Artist	Song	Result
Episode 11 (March 18)
Episode 11 (March 18)	Claudia Leitte	1	Amanda Carregaro	"Long Live"	Eliminated
Episode 11 (March 18)	Claudia Leitte	2	Neto Junqueira	"Do Seu Lado"	Public's vote (50%)
Episode 11 (March 18)	Claudia Leitte	3	Pedro Sousa	"Noite do Prazer"	Coach's choice
Episode 11 (March 18)	Claudia Leitte	4	Yasmin Giacomini	"Não é Proibido"	Eliminated
Episode 11 (March 18)	Carlinhos Brown	5	Giovanna Alvarenga	"Whisky a Go Go"	Eliminated
Episode 11 (March 18)	Carlinhos Brown	6	Maiara Morena	"É Hoje"	Coach's choice
Episode 11 (March 18)	Carlinhos Brown	7	Maria Clara & Mariana	"La Bamba"	Eliminated
Episode 11 (March 18)	Carlinhos Brown	8	Ranna Andrade	"No Meu Coração Você Vai Sempre Estar"	Public's vote (45%)
Episode 11 (March 18)	Simone & Simaria	9	Gustavo Dezani	"Sorte Que Cê Beija Bem"	Eliminated
Episode 11 (March 18)	Simone & Simaria	10	Livia Bernade	"Havana"	Coach's choice
Episode 11 (March 18)	Simone & Simaria	11	Luan Gabriel	"Coração Apertado"	Eliminated
Episode 11 (March 18)	Simone & Simaria	12	Luis Henrique Schultz	"Regime Fechado"	Public's vote (33%)

=== Week 3 ===
==== Quarterfinals ====
Episode	Coach	Order	Artist	Song	Result
Episode 12 (March 25)
Episode 12 (March 25)	Simone & Simaria	1	Augusto Michel	"Enamorado"	Eliminated
Episode 12 (March 25)	Simone & Simaria	2	Eduarda Brasil	"Isso Aqui Tá Bom Demais"	Public's vote (53%)
Episode 12 (March 25)	Simone & Simaria	3	Livia Bernade	"There's Nothing Holdin' Me Back"	Coach's choice
Episode 12 (March 25)	Simone & Simaria	4	Luis Henrique Schultz	"Tudo Que Você Quiser"	Coach's choice
Episode 12 (March 25)	Claudia Leitte	5	Fabiana Moneró	"Dancin' Days"	Coach's choice
Episode 12 (March 25)	Claudia Leitte	6	Fernanda Ouro	"Amor, Meu Grande Amor"	Eliminated
Episode 12 (March 25)	Claudia Leitte	7	Neto Junqueira	"O Que Sobrou do Céu"	Public's vote (54%)
Episode 12 (March 25)	Claudia Leitte	8	Pedro Sousa	"Se Eu Quiser Falar com Deus"	Coach's choice
Episode 12 (March 25)	Carlinhos Brown	9	Maiara Morena	"Circle of Life"	Eliminated
Episode 12 (March 25)	Carlinhos Brown	10	Mariah Yohana	"Biquíni de Bolinha Amarelinha Tão Pequenininho"	Public's vote (40%)
Episode 12 (March 25)	Carlinhos Brown	11	Ranna Andrade	"Só Você"	Coach's choice
Episode 12 (March 25)	Carlinhos Brown	12	Talita Cipriano	"The Greatest Love of All"	Coach's choice

=== Week 4 ===
==== Semifinals ====
Episode	Coach	Order	Artist	Song	Result		
Episode	Coach	Order	Artist	Song	Public points	Coach points	Total points
Episode 13 (April 1)
Episode 13 (April 1)	Carlinhos Brown	1	Mariah Yohana	"Depende de Nós"	45	00	45^{1}
Episode 13 (April 1)	Carlinhos Brown	2	Ranna Andrade	"Como é Grande Meu Amor Por Você"	30	00	30
Episode 13 (April 1)	Carlinhos Brown	3	Talita Cipriano	"Crazy"	25	20	45^{1}
Episode 13 (April 1)	Simone & Simaria	4	Eduarda Brasil	"Feira de Mangaio"	63	20	83
Episode 13 (April 1)	Simone & Simaria	5	Livia Bernarde	"Cheguei Pra Te Amar"	09	00	09
Episode 13 (April 1)	Simone & Simaria	6	Luis Henrique Schultz	"Linda Demais"	28	00	28
Episode 13 (April 1)	Claudia Leitte	7	Fabiana Moneró	"Wrecking Ball"	16	00	16
Episode 13 (April 1)	Claudia Leitte	8	Neto Junqueira	"Diz Pra Mim"	43	20	63
Episode 13 (April 1)	Claudia Leitte	9	Pedro Sousa	"We Are the Champions"	41	00	41

- ^1 With Mariah Yohana and Talita Cipriano tied with 45 points each, coach Carlinhos Brown had the casting vote and controversially choose to eliminate fan favorite Mariah Yohana. However, when producers reverted to the earlier public vote, it was noted that, without rounding, Mariah would have remained in the competition with 45.05 against Talita's 44.82. As result, 3 hours after the show's live broadcast, Rede Globo announced that both artists were sent to the final.

=== Week 5 ===
==== Finals ====
Episode	Coach	Artist	Order	Song	Order	Duet with Coach	Order	Song	Result
Episode 14 (April 8)
Episode 14 (April 8)	Simone & Simaria	Eduarda Brasil	1	"Frevo Mulher"	5	"Chorando Se Foi"	9	"Lamento Sertanejo"	Winner (40.51%)
Episode 14 (April 8)	Carlinhos Brown	Mariah Yohana	2	"Piui Abacaxi"	6	"Ainda Lembro" (with Talita Cipriano)	10	"Não Se Reprima"	Runner-up
Episode 14 (April 8)	Claudia Leitte	Neto Junqueira	3	"Papo Reto"	7	"Bola de Sabão"	11	"Smells Like Teen..."	Runner-up
Episode 14 (April 8)	Carlinhos Brown	Talita Cipriano	4	"Jeito Sexy"	8	"Ainda Lembro" (with Mariah Yohana)	12	"The Voice Within"	Runner-up
