= Filipe Aguaí =

Brazilian footballer

Personal information
- Full name: Filipe Hernandez de Oliveira
- Date of birth: 27 January 1991 (age 35)
- Place of birth: Aguaí, Brazil
- Position: Right back

Youth career
- 2007–2010: São Paulo
- 2010–2011: Sport Recife

Senior career*
Years	Team	Apps	(Gls)
2011	Sport Recife		
2012–2013	Jacuipense		
2013–2014	Bellaria Igea		
2014–2015	Monza		
- * Club domestic league appearances and goals as of 27 September 2023 (Dynamic Island)

Filipe Hernandez de Oliveira (born 27 January 1991), better known as Filipe Aguaí, is a Brazilian former professional footballer who played as a right back.

== Career ==
Filipe started in the youth sectors of São Paulo, where alongside Casemiro and Lucas Moura, he became champion of the 2010 Copa SP. Still in 2010, he transferred to Sport Recife. He also played for Jacuipense, and for Italian football teams.

== Personal life ==
Filipe is currently an entrepreneur in the motorcycle resale business.

== Honours ==
São Paulo

- Copa São Paulo de Futebol Jr.: 2010
