= Polegar =

Brazilian boy band

- Origin: Osasco, São Paulo, Brazil
- Genres: Teen pop, pop rock
- Years active: 1989 - 2014
- Label: Promoart
- Members: Alan Frank; Alex Gill; Ricardo Costa; Rafael Ilha
- Past members: Marcelo Souza; Denis Schlang; André Ricardo; Fernando Kitagawa

Polegar was a Brazilian boy band launched in 1989 by the media company Promoart, which is owned by Gugu Liberato.

== History ==
Consisting of four members, Polegar was most prominent in the late 1980s and early 1990s. They set attendance records in various cities in Brazil and other South American countries. They released their eponymous debut album in 1989, and their song "Dá Pra Mim" earned the group their first gold and platinum certifications with more than 500,000 copies sold. The records "Ando Falando Sozinho" and "Sou Como Sou" were very successful.

In 1990, they released their second album Ela Não Liga, which earned the group another gold and platinum certification with more than 250,000 copies sold. In the same year, the members of the group made their film debut in Uma Escola Atrapalhada, whose cast included Gugu Liberato, Angélica, Supla, and Os Trapalhões. The film also featured their song "Sou Como Sou."

In 1991, their song "Quero Mais" was among the most played songs in Brazil. After three albums, Polegar had more than 1,000,000 of its records sold worldwide.

The group disbanded in 1997 after the departure of one of its members. However, in 2004, they reunited again with three members of the original lineup returning, and they released an album independently, which did not succeed as well as their previous albums. After participating in programs such as Superpop and Pânico na TV, the band ended their activities in 2014.

== Members ==
Polegar's guitarist and vocalist, Denis, a law school graduate, became a delegate in the Civil Police in Concord, an inland city of Santa Catarina. He is a teacher at UNIDAVI, a university in Rio do Sul, Brazil.

Keyboardist Alan Frank is an Ophthalmologist, and served in the Brazilian Air Force.

Singer and bassist Alex Gill recorded a solo album in addition to becoming a music producer and composer.

Guitarist Rafael Ilha works with a clinic specializing in the rehabilitation of drug-dependent patients, and appears on a television program focused on arts, behavior, politics, health, economics and education, A Tarde É Sua, alongside the Brazilian journalist Sonia Abrão.

Guitarist Marcelo and drummer Ricardo Costa both graduated from law school. The latter worked as a director for a radio program in São Paulo.

Alex Gill and Fernando Kitagawa, a long-time friend of the group and a music producer, still work together composing and producing, in addition to performing at various events throughout Brazil.

In 2014, it was announced that the group plans to release a DVD to celebrate 25 years of the band.

== Lineups ==
Training	Bass Guitar and vocals	Guitar and vocals	Guitar and classical guitar	Keyboard and Piano	Battery and Percussion
1ª (1989 a 1990)	Alex	Rafael	Marcelo	Alan	Ricardo
2ª (1990)	Alex	Rafael	Marcelo	Alan	Ricardo
3ª (1991 a 1992)	Alex	André	Marcelo	Alan	Ricardo
4ª (1993 a 1999)	Denis	André	Marcelo	Alan	Ricardo
5ª (1999)	Denis	André	Marcelo	Alan	Ricardo
6ª (2004)	Alex	Rafael	Marcelo	Alan	Ricardo
7ª (2014)	Alex	Rafael	Marcelo	Alan	Ricardo

== Discography ==
=== Studio albums ===
- Polegar (1989)
- Polegar (1990)
- Polegar (1991)
- Polegar (1994)
- Toma Toma
- Rumo

=== Extended plays ===
- 4 Sucessos de Ouro do Polegar

=== Singles ===
- "Dá pra Mim"
- "Ando Falando Sozinho"
- "Sou Como Sou"
- "Ela não Liga"
- "Quero Mais"
- "Qualquer Hora"

== Filmography ==
- Uma Escola Atrapalhada

== See also ==
- Gugu Liberato
- Dominó
- Menudo
