= Kidnapping and murder of Eloá Cristina Pimentel =

2008 Brazilian criminal case

Eloá Pimentel hostage crisis
- Location: Jardim Santo André; Santo André, São Paulo, Brazil
- Date: 13 October 2008; 18 years ago – 17 October 2008; 18 years ago 13:30 – 18:08 (BRT (UTC-3))
- Attack type: Kidnapping, holding hostage, homicide
- Deaths: 1
- Injuries: 1
- Victims: Eloá Pimentel; Nayara da Silva
- Assailant: Lindemberg Alves
- Verdict: Guilty for one count of murder, two counts of attempted murder, five counts of false imprisonment, four counts of weapon shooting
- Convictions: 39 years and 3 months

The kidnapping and murder of Eloá Cristina Pimentel refers to the October 2008 incident involving 15-year-old Brazilian girl Eloá Cristina Pimentel, who was kidnapped, taken against her will and held hostage before being murdered by her 22-year-old ex boyfriend, Lindemberg Alves, who didn’t approve of their breakup. Their relationship started when he was 20 and Eloá was 12. Eloá was shot by Alves during the incident.

The kidnapping received major media exposure, not only because of the murder, but also because of mistakes made by the São Paulo police. Pimentel was held as a hostage for 100 hours, the longest kidnapping ever registered in São Paulo. The trial of Alves commenced on 13 February 2012.

== Kidnapping ==
On 13 October 2008, Eloá Pimentel, Nayara da Silva and two male friends were working on a school project when Pimentel's 22-year-old ex-boyfriend, Lindemberg Fernandes Alves, broke into her apartment in Santo André, São Paulo, holding a pistol. He soon released the two boys but held Pimentel and Silva. The police Grupo de Ações Táticas Especiais (Special Tactical Actions Group, or GATE) closely followed the situation.

On 16 October, Silva was released by Alves, but she offered to return to the apartment, as requested by the police, to try to negotiate with the kidnapper. After she entered the apartment, she was held hostage again. Hours later, after hearing gunshots, the GATE decided to storm the apartment. Many dispute this and state that there were no gunshots before the police forced their entry into the apartment. They eventually stopped and immobilized Alves, but not before he shot Pimentel twice and Silva once.

Pimentel was taken to the hospital, where she was declared brain dead and taken off life support on 18 October, at 23:30 BRT (2:30 GMT on 19 October). Silva survived being shot.

== Aftermath ==
Pimentel was buried in Jardim Santo André cemetery, Santo André, in a ceremony attended by ten thousand people. Her heart, lungs, liver, pancreas, kidneys and cornea were donated to the benefit of seven people. It was later discovered that her father, Everaldo Pereira dos Santos, was a suspect in the murder of two people in the state of Alagoas. Dos Santos fled during the incident but was captured in Maceió on December 28, 2009.

Alves' trial lasted for four days during February 2012. He was found guilty on twelve counts and sentenced to 98 years and ten months of imprisonment. Brazilian law limits the penalty time to thirty years, so the sentence was reduced.

== Controversy ==
The tragedy was widely discussed because of the mistakes committed by the São Paulo police, especially the fact that they allowed Silva to return to the apartment. Marcos do Val, a Brazilian SWAT instructor, pointed out other mistakes, such as allowing the kidnapping to last for so many days, not shooting Alves with a sniper, taking too long to storm the apartment after breaching the door and not using the back door or the windows.

The Brazilian media was heavily criticized following the outcome of the case. Former BOPE (Special Police Operations Battalion) member and sociologist Rodrigo Pimentel, in an interview with the Terra portal, condemned the Brazilian media's coverage, arguing that the TV stations RedeTV!, Rede Record, and Rede Globo were "irresponsible and criminal", and declared that the "Public Prosecutor's Office of São Paulo should hold these TV stations to account".

On 15 October 2008, RedeTV! journalist Sônia Abrão interviewed Alves and Pimentel live by telephone, interfering with the hostage negotiations. Abrão's show, A Tarde É Sua, which had a daily average of 2 points on IBOPE, peaked at 5 points during the interview. According to sociologist and journalist Laurindo Leal Filho, who presented the program Ver TV on TV Câmara about ethics on television, the interference of a broadcaster in a case like this, besides being dangerous, is unconstitutional.

The Federal Public Prosecutor's Office (MP) decided to file a public civil action against the presenter for airing the interview. The MP stated that the interviews interfered with ongoing police activity and put the lives of the teenager and those involved in the operation at risk, and asked for a compensation of 1.5 million reals for collective moral damage.

== In popular culture ==
In 2016, an episode of the true crime documentary television series Investigação Criminal was released about the case.

The "Eloá Case" was portrayed in TV Globo's Linha Direta program on 4 May 2023.

In 2025, Netflix released the Portuguese-language feature-length documentary "Eloá the Hostage: Live on TV".
