= Investigação Criminal =

Brazilian documentary TV series

- Genre: True crime; Documentaries
- Directed by: Beto Ribeiro
- Country of origin: Brazil
- Original language: Portuguese
- No. of seasons: 9

Production
- Production company: Medialand

Original release
- Network: A&E (Brazil)

Investigação Criminal (English: Criminal Investigation) is a Brazilian true crime documentary television series that follows testimonials from police investigations of some of Brazil's most shocking crimes.

== Episodes ==
=== Season 1 (2012) ===
No.	Title	Original release date
1	"Isabella Nardoni"	Beto Ribeiro
2	"Caso Richthofen"	Beto Ribeiro
3	"Caso Mércia Nakashima"	Beto Ribeiro
4	"Glauco Villas Boas"	Beto Ribeiro
5	"Farah Jorge Farah"	Beto Ribeiro
6	"Crime da Oscar Freire"	Beto Ribeiro
7	"Caso Ives Ota"	Beto Ribeiro
8	"Maníaco do Parque"	Beto Ribeiro

=== Season 2 (2013) ===
No.	Title	Original release date
1	"Bianca Consoli"	Beto Ribeiro
2	"Humberto Magalhães"	Beto Ribeiro
3	"Eugênio Chipkevitch"	Beto Ribeiro
4	"Champinha"	Beto Ribeiro
5	"Caso de Bragança Paulista"	Beto Ribeiro
6	"Caso dos Irmãos Asfixiados"	Beto Ribeiro
7	"Gil Rugai"	Beto Ribeiro
8	"Monstro de Rio Claro"	Beto Ribeiro

=== Season 3 (2014) ===
No.	Title	Original release date
1	"Mônica El Khouri"	Beto Ribeiro
2	"Avó e Neto"	Beto Ribeiro
3	"Irmãs Yoshifusa"	Beto Ribeiro
4	"Aparício Basílio"	Beto Ribeiro
5	"Victor Deppman"	Beto Ribeiro
6	"Atirador do Shopping"	Beto Ribeiro
7	"Serial Killer de Itaquaquecetuba"	Beto Ribeiro
8	"Magda Roncati"	Beto Ribeiro

=== Season 4 (2015) ===
No.	Title	Original release date
1	"João Hélio"	Beto Ribeiro
2	"Casal de Idosos"	Beto Ribeiro
3	"Janken"	Beto Ribeiro
4	"Médico Dárcio"	Beto Ribeiro
5	"Maestro Mario Luiz Borin"	Beto Ribeiro
6	"Governador do Acre"	Beto Ribeiro
7	"Maria Tatiana"	Beto Ribeiro
8	"Maníaco de Ribeirão Pires"	Beto Ribeiro

=== Season 5 (2016) ===
No.	Title	Original release date
1	"Eloá Cristina"	Beto Ribeiro
2	"Débora Regina"	Beto Ribeiro
3	"Maiara e Nicole"	Beto Ribeiro
4	"Serial Killer de Prostitutas"	Beto Ribeiro
5	"Francês"	Beto Ribeiro
6	"Celso Mazzieri"	Beto Ribeiro
7	"Maníaco da Cantareira"	Beto Ribeiro
8	"Natália Moralo"	Beto Ribeiro

== Release ==
Investigação Criminal began airing on December 4, 2012, on A&E in Brazil. On 2018, the series has been licensed to Netflix.
