= São João da Boa Vista =

- Municipality
- Município de São João da Boa Vista
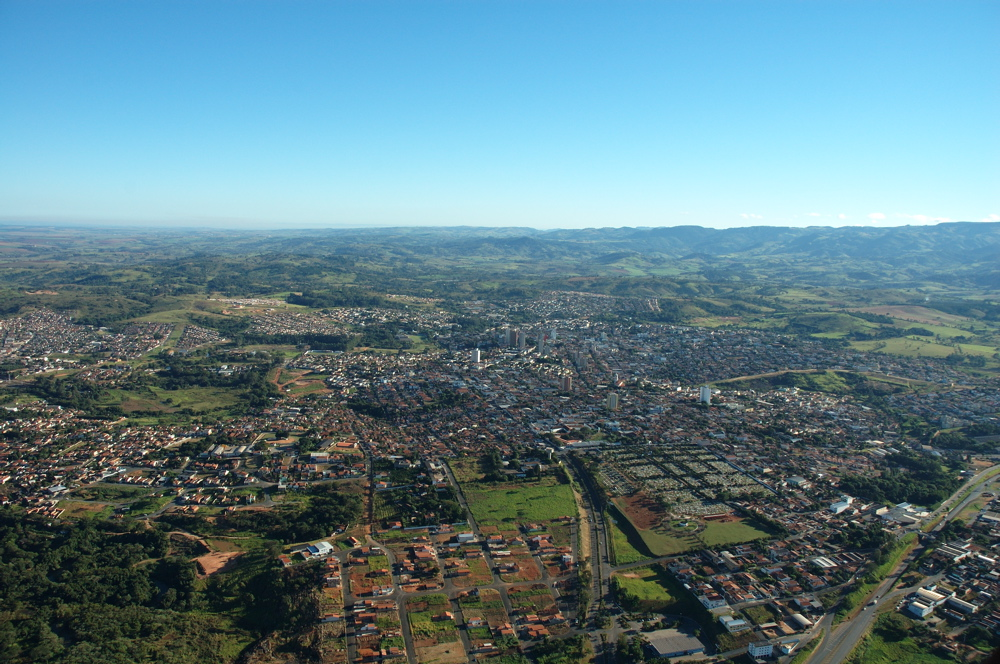
- Aerial view of São João da Boa Vista

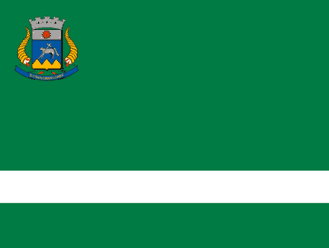
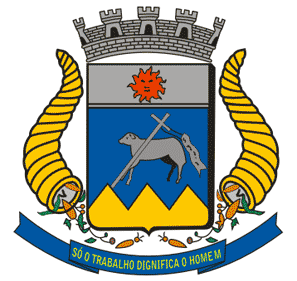
- Flag Coat of arms

- Location of São João da Boa Vista in São Paulo (state)

- Location of São João da Boa Vista in Brazil
- Coordinates: 21°58′09″S 46°47′53″W
- Country: Brazil
- Region: Southeast Region
- State: São Paulo
- Founded: June 24, 1824

Government
  - Mayor: Vanderlei Borges de Carvalho

Area
  - Total: 516.399 km^{2} (199.383 sq mi)
- Elevation: 767 m (2,516 ft)

Population (2020)
  - Total: 91,771

São João da Boa Vista (Portuguese pronunciation: [ˈsɐ̃w ʒuˈɐ̃w dɐ ˈboɐ ˈvistɐ]; "Saint John of the Good View" in English) is a municipality in the state of São Paulo, Brazil. The population in 2020 was 91,771 and the area is 516.399 square kilometres (199.383 mi^{2}). The elevation is 767 metres (2,516 ft).

== History ==
The city was founded on June 24, 1824, when a group of miners decided to rest at the edge of Jaguari Mirim River, which was already in the state of São Paulo. Amazed by the beauty of the natural surroundings, the miners decided immediately to establish a town on the site and, to celebrate that day's saint as well as the amazing views at sunset, the city was named São João da Boa Vista. Only 14 years later, the town was declared a district. On March 24, 1859 it became a city, and on February 7, 1885 it became a judicial district, providing to its citizens all of the basic infrastructure.

== Demography ==
Historical population (municipality)
Year	Population	%±
1920	51,993
1940	39,155	−24.7%
1950	33,874	−13.5%
1960	39,551	16.8%
1970	44,471	12.4%
1980	55,938	25.8%
1991	69,148	23.6%
2000	77,387	11.9%
2010	83,639	8.1%
2022	92,547	10.7%

=== Demographics ===
According to IBGE 2010, São João da Boa Vista has 83,661 inhabitants.

Etnias
Color/Race	Percentage
White	85,36%
African	4,47%
Multiracial	9,54%
Asian	0,09%
Indigenous Peoples	0,03%
Without Declaration	0,50%

== Media ==
In telecommunications, the city was served by Telecomunicações de São Paulo. In July 1998, this company was acquired by Telefónica, which adopted the Vivo brand in 2012. The company is currently an operator of cell phones, fixed lines, internet (fiber optics/4G) and television (satellite and cable).

== Notable people ==
- Nenê Bonilha – football player
- Glenn McMillan – actor and lawyer
- Mariana Morais – MMA featherweight fighter
- Guiomar Novaes – famous piano player
- Roger Abdelmassih – a doctor and pioneer of in-vitro fertilization, who was also convicted of multiple rapes.

== Climate ==
Climate data for São João da Boa Vista, elevation 776 m (2,546 ft), (2006–2020 normals, extremes 2005–2014)
Month	Jan	Feb	Mar	Apr	May	Jun	Jul	Aug	Sep	Oct	Nov	Dec	Year
Record high °C (°F)	34.7 (94.5)	35.1 (95.2)	35.6 (96.1)	34.8 (94.6)	32.0 (89.6)	31.8 (89.2)	33.4 (92.1)	35.0 (95.0)	37.0 (98.6)	40.6 (105.1)	36.2 (97.2)	37.3 (99.1)	40.6 (105.1)
Mean daily maximum °C (°F)	29.6 (85.3)	30.3 (86.5)	29.6 (85.3)	28.5 (83.3)	25.9 (78.6)	25.0 (77.0)	25.6 (78.1)	27.5 (81.5)	29.3 (84.7)	30.1 (86.2)	28.8 (83.8)	29.5 (85.1)	28.3 (83.0)
Daily mean °C (°F)	24.4 (75.9)	24.8 (76.6)	24.1 (75.4)	22.7 (72.9)	19.9 (67.8)	19.0 (66.2)	19.3 (66.7)	20.8 (69.4)	22.8 (73.0)	23.9 (75.0)	23.5 (74.3)	24.3 (75.7)	22.5 (72.4)
Mean daily minimum °C (°F)	19.2 (66.6)	19.3 (66.7)	18.7 (65.7)	16.9 (62.4)	13.9 (57.0)	13.0 (55.4)	13.0 (55.4)	14.1 (57.4)	16.3 (61.3)	17.8 (64.0)	18.3 (64.9)	19.0 (66.2)	16.6 (61.9)
Record low °C (°F)	15.0 (59.0)	15.9 (60.6)	13.1 (55.6)	10.3 (50.5)	5.6 (42.1)	4.4 (39.9)	2.5 (36.5)	1.8 (35.2)	4.1 (39.4)	10.1 (50.2)	10.7 (51.3)	13.2 (55.8)	1.8 (35.2)
Average precipitation mm (inches)	270.8 (10.66)	167.5 (6.59)	161.0 (6.34)	92.7 (3.65)	60.8 (2.39)	37.5 (1.48)	50.5 (1.99)	68.4 (2.69)	88.5 (3.48)	161.2 (6.35)	175.3 (6.90)	231.2 (9.10)	1,565.4 (61.62)
Average precipitation days (≥ 1.0 mm)	19.1	15.4	15.5	8.7	6.6	6.6	6.7	8.6	12.1	14.4	15.7	17.9	147.3
Source: Centro Integrado de Informações Agrometeorológicas

== See also ==
- List of municipalities in São Paulo
