= Lindo Balão Azul =

1982 Brazilian children's pop song

Song by Aretha, Moraes Moreira, Ricardo Graça Mello, Bebel Gilberto, Baby Consuelo

from the album Pirlimpimpim
- Language: Portuguese
- Released: 1982
- Genre: Pop · children's music
- Label: Som Livre
- Songwriter: Guilherme Arantes
- Producer: Guto Graça Mello

Music video
- "Lindo Balão Azul" on YouTube

"Lindo Balão Azul" (lit. 'Beautiful Blue Balloon') is a Brazilian children's pop song composed by Guilherme Arantes and released as part of the soundtrack for the television special Pirlimpimpim, broadcast by Rede Globo in 1982, in honor of the centenary of the writer Monteiro Lobato. The special's theme revolved around the journey into space undertaken by the characters Emília, Pedrinho, Narizinho, and Visconde de Sabugosa, from the Sítio do Picapau Amarelo novel series. According to the composer, each of the characters inhabits the world of the moon in a distinct manner: "Visconde, for being futuristic and whimsical; Emília, as the artist, the dreamer and romantic genius; Pedrinho, the adventurous spirit; and Narizinho, vivacity and intelligence"—aspects that were incorporated into the song's lyrics.

The vocals for the song were performed by Aretha, Moraes Moreira, Ricardo Graça Mello, Bebel Gilberto, and Baby Consuelo. The song achieved immediate success upon its release; according to the Escritório Central de Arrecadação e Distribuição (ECAD), it was the ninth most-played track on Brazilian radio stations between April and May 1983. The album Pirlimpimpim sold over 500,000 copies by 1984, while the single earned a Gold Record for exceeding 100,000 copies sold. The song's producer, Guto Graça Mello, was also awarded a Gold Record for his contribution.

The boy band Dominó recorded a Spanish-language version in 1985, which achieved success in Spain and Venezuela. The clown duo Patati Patatá recorded a new version of the song in 2012.
