= Jaguari Mirim River =

Location
- Country: Brazil

Physical characteristics
- Source
  - location: São Paulo state
- Mouth
  - coordinates: 21°58′53″S 047°17′37″W

The Jaguari Mirim River is a river of São Paulo state in southeastern Brazil. It is a tributary of the Moji-Guaçu River.

== See also ==
- List of rivers of São Paulo
